= Archery at the 2012 Summer Paralympics – Women's individual recurve =

The Women's individual recurve archery discipline at the 2012 Summer Paralympics was contested in two classifications, one combined of W1/W2 wheelchair competitors and one for standing archers. The competitions ran from August 30 to September 4.

In the ranking rounds each archer shot 72 arrows. In the knock-out stages each archer shot three arrows per set, scoring two points for a won set and one for a draw. Matches were won by the first archer to six points.

== W1/W2 ==
Archery, Women's recurve W1/W2 at the XIV Paralympic Games
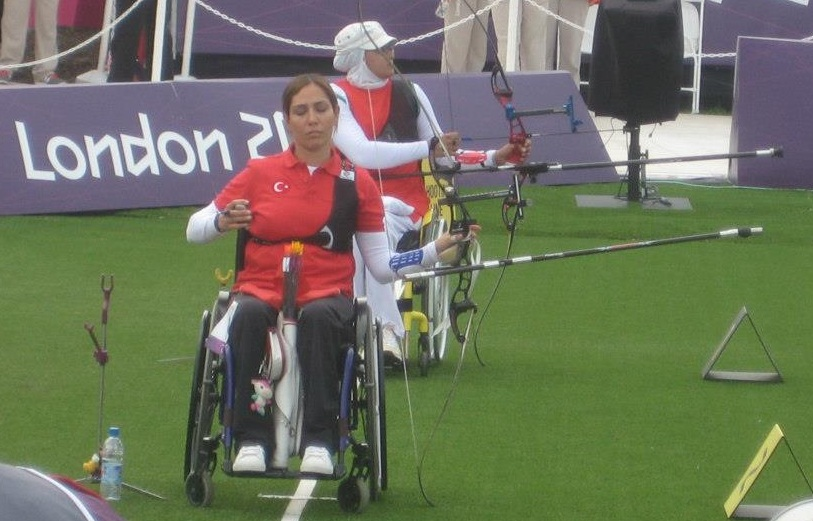
- Gold medallist Zahra Nemati (far side) in her quarter final with Gizem Girişmen
- Venue: Royal Artillery Barracks
- Dates: August 30 - September 4, 2012
- Competitors: 20 from 12 nations

Medalists
1st place, gold medalist(s)		Zahra Nemati	Iran
2nd place, silver medalist(s)		Elisabetta Mijno	Italy
3rd place, bronze medalist(s)		Li Jinzhi	China

In the ranking round each archer shot 72 arrows. In the knock-out stages each archer shot three arrows per set, scoring two points for a won set and one for a draw. Matches were won by the first archer to six points.

=== Ranking Round ===
PR = Paralympic Record. DT=Disk toss used to break the tie.

Rank	Archer	Score	10's	X's	Notes
1	Zahra Nemati (IRI)	613	15	7	PR
2	Elisabetta Mijno (ITA)	588	11	5	
3	Xiao Yanhong (CHN)	560	12	7	
4	Roksolana Dzoba-Balian (UKR)	552	5	2	
5	Ko Hee Sook (KOR)	548	10	1	
6	Iryna Volynets (UKR)	539	6	0	
7	Ozlem Hacer Kalay (TUR)	537	6	2	
8	Kate Murray (GBR)	533	10	5	
9	Gizem Girişmen (TUR)	533	4	1	
10	Saana-Maria Sinisalo (FIN)	523	8	1	
11	Li Jinzhi (CHN)	522	7	4	
12	Veronica Floreno (ITA)	517	5	0	
13	Hatice Bayar (TUR)	498	6	3	
14	Marketa Sidkova (CZE)	488	6	3	
15	Lenka Kuncova (CZE)	483	5	3	
16	Mariangela Perna (ITA)	480	2	1	
17	Maria Droste (GER)	461	5	2	
18	Miroslava Cerna (CZE)	442	4	2	
19	Zinyat Valiyeva (AZE)	435	3	2	
20	Lyne Tremblay (CAN)	423	1	1	

=== Competition bracket ===
==== Section 1 ====
Round of 32			Round of 16			Quarter-finals
			1	Zahra Nemati (IRI)	6
17	Maria Droste (GER)	0	16	Mariangela Perna (ITA)	0
16	Mariangela Perna (ITA)	6				1	Zahra Nemati (IRI)	6
						9	Gizem Girismen (TUR)	0
			9	Gizem Girismen (TUR)	7
			8	Kate Murray (GBR)	1

==== Section 2 ====
Round of 32			Round of 16			Quarter-finals
			5	Ko Hee Sook (KOR)	2
			12	Veronica Floreno (ITA)	6
						12	Veronica Floreno (ITA)	6
13	Hatice Bayar (TUR)	6				13	Hatice Bayar (TUR)	2
20	Lyne Tremblay (CAN)	0	13	Hatice Bayar (TUR)	6
			4	Dzoba-Balian Roksolana (UKR)	4

==== Section 3 ====
Round of 32			Round of 16			Quarter-finals
			3	Xiao Yanhong (CHN)	2
19	Zinyat Valiyeva (AZE)	0	14	Marketa Sidkova (CZE)	6
14	Marketa Sidkova (CZE)	6				14	Marketa Sidkova (CZE)	5
						11	Li Jinzhi (CHN)	6
			11	Li Jinzhi (CHN)	6
			6	Iryna Volynets (UKR)	4

==== Section 4 ====
Round of 32			Round of 16			Quarter-finals
			7	Ozlem Hacer Kalay (TUR)	6
			10	Saana-Maria Sinisalo (FIN)	2
						7	Ozlem Hacer Kalay (TUR)	2
15	Lenka Kuncova (CZE)	6				2	Elisabetta Mijno (ITA)	6
18	Miroslava Cerna (CZE)	2	15	Lenka Kuncova (CZE)	3
			2	Elisabetta Mijno (ITA)	7

==== Finals ====
Quarter-finals
1	Zahra Nemati (IRI)	6
2	Gizem Girismen (TUR)	0
12	Veronica Floreno (ITA)	6
4	Hatice Bayar (TUR)	2
14	Marketa Sidkova (CZE)	5
6	Li Jinzhi (CHN)	6
7	Ozlem Hacer Kalay (TUR)	2
8	Elisabetta Mijno (ITA)	6

Semi-finals
1	Zahra Nemati (IRI)	6
12	Veronica Floreno (ITA)	0
11	Li Jinzhi (CHN)	4
2	Elisabetta Mijno (ITA)	6

Gold medal match
1	Zahra Nemati (IRI)	7
2	Elisabetta Mijno (ITA)	3
Bronze medal match
12	Veronica Floreno (ITA)	4
11	Li Jinzhi (CHN)	6

== Standing ==
Archery, Women's recurve standing at the XIV Paralympic Games
- Venue: Royal Artillery Barracks
- Dates: August 30 - September 4
- Competitors: 19 from 13 nations

Medalists
1st place, gold medalist(s)		Yan Huilian	China
2nd place, silver medalist(s)		Lee Hwa Sook	South Korea
3rd place, bronze medalist(s)		Milena Olszewska	Poland

=== Ranking Round ===
Rank	Archer	Score	10's	X's
1	Gao Fangxia (CHN)	581	12	4
2	Milena Olszewska (POL)	580	11	5
3	Yan Huilian (CHN)	573	11	3
4	Lee Hwa Sook (KOR)	555	4	1
5	Razieh Shir Mohammadi (IRI)	552	11	5
6	Sharon Vennard (GBR)	549	3	0
7	Kim Ran Sook (KOR)	536	7	2
8	Javzmaa Byambasuren (MGL)	524	0	0
9	Wasana Khuthawisap (THA)	522	5	2
10	Irina Batorova (RUS)	517	7	1
11	Oyun-Erdene Buyanjargal (MGL)	516	7	2
12	Magali Comte (SUI)	514	3	1
13	Anna Tzika (GRE)	498	4	0
14	Katharina Schett (GER)	497	6	1
15	Zahra Javanmard (IRI)	481	1	0
16	Grazyna Wojciechowska (POL)	477	0	0
17	Brigitte Duboc (FRA)	470	4	2
18	Leigh Walmsley (GBR)	467	6	3
19	Lee Ford (USA)	417	0	0

=== Competition bracket ===
==== Section 1 ====
Round of 32			Round of 16			Quarter-finals
			1	Gao Fangxia (CHN)	6
17	Brigitte Duboc (FRA)	6	17	Brigitte Duboc (FRA)	0
16	Grazyna Wojciechowska (POL)	2				1	Gao Fangxia (CHN)	0
						8	Javzmaa Byambasuren (MGL)	6
			9	Wasana Khuthawisap (THA)	4
			8	Javzmaa Byambasuren (MGL)	6

==== Section 2 ====
Round of 32	Round of 16			Quarter-finals
	5	Razieh Shir Mohammadi (IRI)	2
	12	Magali Comte (SUI)	6
				12	Magali Comte (SUI)	4
				4	Lee Hwa Sook (KOR)	6
	13	Anna Tzika (GRE)	0
	4	Lee Hwa Sook (KOR)	6

==== Section 3 ====
Round of 32			Round of 16			Quarter-finals
			3	Yan Huilian (CHN)	6
19	Lee Ford (USA)	6	19	Lee Ford (USA)	4
14	Katharina Schett (GER)	5				3	Yan Huilian (CHN)	6
						6	Sharon Vennard (GBR)	0
			11	Oyun-Erdene Buyanjargal (MGL)	2
			6	Sharon Vennard (GBR)	6

==== Section 4 ====
Round of 32			Round of 16			Quarter-finals
			7	Kim Ran Sook (KOR)	4
			10	Irina Batorova (RUS)	6
						10	Irina Batorova (RUS)	4
15	Zahra Javanmard (IRI)	0				2	Milena Olszewska (POL)	6
18	Leigh Walmsley (GBR)	6	18	Leigh Walmsley (GBR)	1
			2	Milena Olszewska (POL)	7

==== Finals ====
Quarter-finals
1	Gao Fangxia (CHN)	0
8	Javzmaa Byambasuren (MGL)	6
12	Magali Comte (SUI)	4
4	Lee Hwa Sook (KOR)	6
3	Yan Huilian (CHN)	6
6	Sharon Vennard (GBR)	0
10	Irina Batorova (RUS)	4
2	Milena Olszewska (POL)	6

Semi-finals
8	Javzmaa Byambasuren (MGL)	3
4	Lee Hwa Sook (KOR)	7
3	Yan Huilian (CHN)	6
2	Milena Olszewska (POL)	2

Gold medal match
4	Lee Hwa Sook (KOR)	4
3	Yan Huilian (CHN)	6
Bronze medal match
8	Javzmaa Byambasuren (MGL)	2
2	Milena Olszewska (POL)	6
