= Archery at the 2012 Summer Paralympics – Women's team recurve =

Women's archery competition

The Women's team recurve was one of the events held in archery at the 2012 Summer Paralympics in London.

== Team recurve ==
Women's team recurve at the XIV Paralympic Games
- Paralympic Archery
- Venue: The Royal Artillery Barracks
- Competitors: 21 from 7 nations

Medalists
1st place, gold medalist(s)		Kim Ran Sook; Ko Hee Sook; Lee Hwa Sook	South Korea
2nd place, silver medalist(s)		Gao Fangxia; Xiao Yanhong; Yan Huilian	China
3rd place, bronze medalist(s)		Zahra Javanmard; Zahra Nemati; Razieh Shir Mohammadi	Iran

=== Ranking round ===
Rank	Nation	Archers	Score
1	China (CHN)	Gao Fangxia; Xiao Yanhong; Yan Huilian	1714
2	Iran (IRI)	Zahra Javanmard; Zahra Nemati; Razieh Shir Mohammadi	1646
3	South Korea (KOR)	Kim Ran Sook; Ko Hee Sook; Lee Hwa Sook	1639
4	Italy (ITA)	Veronica Floreno; Elisabetta Mijno; Mariangela Perna	1585
5	Turkey (TUR)	Hatice Bayar; Gizem Girismen; Ozlem Hacer Kalay	1568
6	Great Britain (GBR)	Kate Murray; Sharon Vennard; Leigh Walmsley	1549
7	Czech Republic (CZE)	Miroslava Cerna; Lenka Kuncova; Marketa Sidkova	1413

=== Competition bracket ===
Quarter-finals
5	Turkey (TUR)	175
4	Italy (ITA)	183
3	South Korea (KOR)	188
6	Great Britain (GBR)	153
7	Czech Republic (CZE)	167
2	Iran (IRI)	189

Semi-finals
1	China (CHN)	192
4	Italy (ITA)	188
3	South Korea (KOR)	192
2	Iran (IRI)	186

Finals
1	China (CHN)	193
3	South Korea (KOR)	199
Third place
4	Italy (ITA)	184
2	Iran (IRI)	188
