= List of archers =

This article contains a list of notable archers from modern-day, historical, and fictional sources.

== Historical ==
- Arjuna
- Huang Zhong
- Einar Tambarskjelve
- Horace A. Ford
- Howard Hill
- Ishi
- Jack Churchill
- Genghis Khan
- Jumong
- Lu Bu
- Minamoto no Tametomo
- Nasu no Yoichi
- Robin Hood (Although the classical Robin is a fiction, his character is probably a conflation of several real historical figures)
- Prithviraj Chauhan
- Saxton Pope
- Taishi Ci
- Yue Fei
- Zhou Tong (archer)
- Jebe

== Athletes ==
The following sections are alphabetized by last name.

=== Compound bow ===
- Mel Clarke
- Melissa-Jane Daniel
- Roberval "Tico" dos Santos
- Peter Elzinga
- Sara López
- Mike Schloesser
- John Stubbs (archer)
- Reo Wilde
- Chris White
- Ella Gibson
- ((Camilla Helmerson))

=== Recurve bow ===
- Brady Ellison
- Victor Wunderle
- Jake Kaminski
- Jacob Wukie
- Khatuna Lorig
- Aida Roman
- Lindsey Carmichael
- Miroslava Cerna
- Simon Fairweather
- Gao Fangxia
- Naomi Folkard
- Gizem Girişmen
- Fu Hongzhi
- Deepika Kumari
- Lenka Kuncova
- Park Kyung-mo
- Lee Hwa Sook
- Justyna Mospinek
- Małgorzata Olejnik
- Darrell Pace
- Limba Ram
- Viktor Ruban
- Park Sung-hyun
- Simon Terry
- Natalia Valeeva
- Alison Williamson
- Yan Huilian
- Xiao Yanhong

=== Composite bow ===
- Lajos Kassai

== Religious and mythological ==
- Arjuna
- Abhimanyu
- Agilaz
- Apollo
- Arash
- Artemis
- Ashwathama
- Bhishma
- Cupid
- Drona
- Eklavya
- Feng Meng
- Guru Gobind Singh Ji
- Hayk
- Heracles
- Houyi
- Indrajit
- Karna
- Laxman
- Odysseus
- Parashurama
- Rama
- Rudra
- Skaði
- Teucer
- Ullr

== Fictional ==
Name	Source material	Medium
Alec Lightwood	The Mortal Instruments	Novel series
Alisa Reinford	The Legend of Heroes: Trails of Cold Steel	Video game
Allison Argent	Teen Wolf	TV series
Aloy	Horizon: Zero Dawn	Video game
Amazons	Various	Greek mythology
Archer	Fate/Stay Night	Novel series / TV series / Computer game
Bard the Bowman	The Hobbit	Novel / Film series
Beleg	The Silmarillion; The Lays of Beleriand; The Children of Húrin	Novel series
Daryl Dixon	The Walking Dead	TV series
Eirin Yagokoro	Touhou Project: Imperishable Night	Video game
Ellie	The Last of Us	Video game
Clint Barton (Hawkeye)	The Avengers	Comics / Film series
Eragon	Eragon	Novel series
Faendal	The Elder Scrolls V: Skyrim	Video Game
Finnula Crais	Ransom My Heart	Novel
Gale Hawthorne	Hunger Games	Film / Novel Series
Green Arrow	Green Arrow	Comics / TV series
Golden Archer	Golden Archer	Comics
Guo Jing	The Legend of the Condor Heroes	Novel
Halt	Ranger's Apprentice	Novel series
Hanzo	Overwatch	Video game
Hua Rong	Water Margin (Shuihu Zhuan)	Chinese literature
Jun Yabuki	Choudenshi Bioman	TV series
Kate Bishop (Hawkeye)	Young Avengers	Comics
James Stark (Stark)	House of Night series	Novel Series
Kagome Higurashi	Inuyasha	Manga / Anime television series
Katniss Everdeen	The Hunger Games	Novel series / Film series
Kíli	The Hobbit	Novel / Film series
Lara Croft	Tomb Raider	Video game series
Legolas Greenleaf	The Lord of the Rings	Novel series / Film series
Lenneth Valkyrie	Valkyrie Profile	Video game
Link	The Legend of Zelda	Video game / Animated series
Madoka Kaname	Puella Magi Madoka Magica	Anime television series
May Welland	The Age of Innocence	Novel / Film
Merida	Brave	Film
Philoctetes	Philoctetes	Greek mythology
Pit	Kid Icarus	Video game series
John Rambo	First Blood	Film
Revali	The Legend of Zelda: Breath of the Wild	Video game
Robin Hood	Robin of Locksley	Novel / Film
Roger Parsons (Golden Arrow)	Whiz Comics	Comics
Rowen Hashiba	Ronin Warriors	Anime television series
Sailor Mars	Sailor Moon	Manga / Anime television series
Sebastian Vael	Dragon Age II	Video game
Silmeria Valkyrie	Valkyrie Profile 2: Silmeria	Video game
Susan Pevensie	Chronicles of Narnia	Film / Novel series
Sylvanas Windrunner	Warcraft	Video game series
Tauriel	The Hobbit	Film series
Theon Greyjoy	A Song of Ice and Fire	Novel series / TV series
Thomas of Hookton	The Grail Quest	Novel series
Umi Sonoda	Love Live!	Manga / Anime television series
Uryu Ishida	Bleach	Manga / Anime television series
urVa	The Dark Crystal: Age of Resistance	TV series
Will Treaty	Ranger's Apprentice	Novel series
Yona	Akatsuki no Yona	Manga / Anime television series
Ygritte	A Song of Ice and Fire	Novel series / TV Series
Princess Zelda	The Legend of Zelda	Video game series
