= Archery at the 2016 Summer Paralympics – Women's individual recurve open =

2016 Paralympics open recurve archery

Archery, Women's recurve open at the XV Paralympic Games
- Dates: September 10, 15, 2016
- Competitors: 32

Medalists
1st place, gold medalist(s)		Zahra Nemati	Iran
2nd place, silver medalist(s)		Wu Chunyan	China
3rd place, bronze medalist(s)		Milena Olszewska	Poland

The Women's individual recurve open archery discipline at the 2016 Summer Paralympics was contested from September 10 to September 15. Ranking rounds took place on 10 September, while knockout rounds continued on September 15.

In the ranking rounds each archer shot 72 arrows, and was seeded according to score. In the knock-out stages each archer shot three arrows per set against an opponent, scoring two points for a won set and one for a draw. Matches were won by the first archer to six points. Losing semifinalists competed in a bronze medal match.

== Ranking Round ==
PR = Paralympic Record.

Rank	Archer	Nation	Score	Notes
1	Wu Chunyan	China	637	PR
2	Zahra Nemati	Iran	627	
3	Ye Jinyan	China	622	
4	Milena Olszewska	Poland	619	
5	Lin Dandan	China	618	
6	Lee Hwa Sook	South Korea	607	
7	Dorothea Poimenidou	Greece	605	
8	Roksolana Dzoba-Balyan	Ukraine	603	
9	Merve Nur Eroglu	Turkey	603	
10	Elisabetta Mijno	Italy	601	
11	Jennifer Hess	Germany	594	
12	Ieva Melle	Latvia	592	
13	Wasana Khuthawisap	Thailand	584	
14	Zehra Ozbey Torun	Turkey	582	
15	Iryna Volynets	Ukraine	572	
16	Tania Nadarajah	Great Britain	567	
17	Oyun-Erdene Buyanjargal	Mongolia	563	
18	Jo Jang Moon	South Korea	553	
19	Marketa Sidkova	Czech Republic	551	
20	Fabíola Dergovics	Brazil	551	
21	Lee Yun-Hsien	Chinese Taipei	550	
22	Veronica Floreno	Italy	549	
23	Magali Comte	Switzerland	548	
24	Mohadeseh Kohansal	Iran	541	
25	Zaman Al-Saedi	Iraq	540	
26	Brigitte Duboc	France	524	
27	Lenka Kuncova	Czech Republic	517	
28	Thais Silva Carvalho	Brazil	517	
29	Pooja Pooja	India	513	
30	Ha Sam Suk	South Korea	513	
31	Zinyat Valiyeva	Azerbaijan	472	
32	Patricia Layolle	Brazil	461	

== Knockout stage ==
=== Finals ===
Quarterfinals
1	Wu Chunyan (CHN)	2	0	2	0	2
8	Roksolana Dzoba-Balyan (UKR)	0	2	0	2	0
12	Ieva Melle (LAT)	0	0	0
4	Milena Olszewska (POL)	2	2	2
14	Zehra Ozbey Torun (TUR)	1	0	2	0	0
6	Lee Hwa Sook (KOR)	1	2	0	2	2
10	Elisabetta Mijno (ITA)	0	0	2	2	0
2	Zahra Nemati (IRI)	2	2	0	0	2

Semifinals
1	Wu Chunyan (CHN)	2	1	2	2
4	Milena Olszewska (POL)	0	1	0	0
6	Lee Hwa Sook (KOR)	0	0	0
2	Zahra Nemati (IRI)	2	2	2

Finals
1	Wu Chunyan (CHN)	2	0	2	0	0	2nd place, silver medalist(s)
2	Zahra Nemati (IRI)	0	2	0	2	2	1st place, gold medalist(s)
Third place
4	Milena Olszewska (POL)	2	2	0	0	1	1 (bronze)
6	Lee Hwa Sook (KOR)	0	0	2	2	1	0

=== Section 1 ===
Round of 32			Round of 16			Quarterfinals
1	Wu Chunyan (CHN)	6
32	Patricia Layolle (BRA)	0	1	Wu Chunyan (CHN)	7
17	Buyanjargal Oyun-Erdene (MGL)	6	17	Buyanjargal Oyun-Erdene (MGL)	3
16	Tania Nadarajah (GBR)	2				1	Wu Chunyan (CHN)	6
9	Merve Nur Eroglu (TUR)	2				8	Roksolana Dzoba-Balyan (UKR)	4
24	Mohadeseh Kohansal (IRI)	6	24	Mohadeseh Kohansal (IRI)	0
25	Zaman Al-Saedi (IRQ)	2	8	Roksolana Dzoba-Balyan (UKR)	6
8	Roksolana Dzoba-Balyan (UKR)	6

=== Section 2 ===
Round of 32			Round of 16			Quarterfinals
5	Lin Dandan (CHN)	3
28	Thais Silva Carvalho (BRA)	7	28	Thais Silva Carvalho (BRA)	4
21	Lee Yun-Hsien (TPE)	5	12	Ieva Melle (LAT)	6
12	Ieva Melle (LAT)	6				12	Ieva Melle (LAT)	0
13	Wasana Khuthawisap (THA)	6				4	Milena Olszewska (POL)	6
20	Fabíola Dergovics (BRA)	4	13	Wasana Khuthawisap (THA)	0
29	Pooja Khanna (IND)	2	4	Milena Olszewska (POL)	6
4	Milena Olszewska (POL)	6

=== Section 3 ===
Round of 32			Round of 16			Quarterfinals
3	Ye Jinyan (CHN)	7
30	Ha Sam Suk (KOR)	1	3	Ye Jinyan (CHN)	2
19	Marketa Sidkova (CZE)	4	14	Zehra Ozbey Torun (TUR)	6
14	Zehra Ozbey Torun (TUR)	6				14	Zehra Ozbey Torun (TUR)	3
11	Jennifer Hess (GER)	4				6	Lee Hwa Sook (KOR)	7
22	Veronica Floreno (ITA)	6	22	Veronica Floreno (ITA)	0
27	Lenka Kuncova (CZE)	0	6	Lee Hwa Sook (KOR)	6
6	Lee Hwa Sook (KOR)	6

=== Section 4 ===
Round of 32			Round of 16			Quarterfinals
7	Dorothea Poimenidou (GRE)	4
26	Brigitte Duboc (FRA)	6	26	Brigitte Duboc (FRA)	0
23	Magali Comte (SUI)	0	10	Elisabetta Mijno (ITA)	6
10	Elisabetta Mijno (ITA)	6				10	Elisabetta Mijno (ITA)	4
15	Iryna Volynets (UKR)	4				2	Zahra Nemati (IRI)	6
18	Jo Jang Moon (KOR)	6	18	Jo Jang Moon (KOR)	0
31	Zinyat Valiyeva (AZE)	0	2	Zahra Nemati (IRI)	6
2	Zahra Nemati (IRI)	6
