= Czech Republic at the 2012 Summer Paralympics =

- IPC code: CZE
- NPC: Czech Paralympic Committee
- Website: www.paralympic.cz

in London
- Competitors: 47 in 6 sports
- Flag bearer: Rostislav Pohlmann
- Medals Ranked 42nd: Gold 1 Silver 6 Bronze 4 Total 11

Summer Paralympics appearances (overview)
- 1996; 2000; 2004; 2008; 2012; 2016; 2020; 2024

Other related appearances
- Czechoslovakia (1972–1992)

Czech Republic competed at the 2012 Summer Paralympics in London, United Kingdom from August 29 to September 9, 2012.

== Medalists ==
Medal	Name	Sport	Event	Date
Gold	Jiří Ježek	Cycling	Men's time trial C4	5 September
Silver	David Drahoninsky	Archery	Men's individual compound W1	3 September
Silver	Radim Beles	Athletics	Men's club throw F31/32/51	31 August
Silver	Rostislav Pohlmann	Athletics	Men's discus throw F57–58	31 August
Silver	Leos Lacina; Radek Prochazka	Boccia	Pairs BC4	4 September
Silver	Jiří Ježek	Cycling	Men's individual pursuit C4	1 September
Silver	Tereza Diepoldova	Cycling	Women's time trial C1-3	5 September
Bronze	Eva Berna	Athletics	Women's shot put F37	4 September
Bronze	Jiri Bouska	Cycling	Men's time trial C4	5 September
Bronze	David Vondracek	Cycling	Mixed road race T1-2	8 September
Bronze	Jan Povýšil	Swimming	Men's 100m freestyle S4	5 September

== Archery ==
Men

Athlete	Event	Ranking round		Round of 32	Round of 16	Quarterfinals	Semifinals	Finals	
Athlete	Event	Score	Seed	Opposition score	Opposition score	Opposition score	Opposition score	Opposition score	Rank
Leos Bartoš	Men's individual compound open	657	7	Nazar (UKR); W 7-1	Kantczak (POL); W 6-0	Forsberg (FIN); L 0-6	Did not advance		
Jiri Klich	Men's individual compound open	637	17	Hennahane (GBR); W 6-4	Stutzman (USA); L 5-6	Did not advance			
Jaroslav Zelenka	Men's individual compound open	619	27	Kascak (SVK); L 0-6	Did not advance				
Petr Bartoš	Men's individual compound W1	546	12	—N/a	Kinnunen (FIN); L 0-6	Did not advance			
David Drahonínský	Men's individual compound W1	662	1	—N/a		Azzolini (ITA); W 6-5	Kinnunen (FIN); W 6-0	Fabry (USA); L 2-6	2nd place, silver medalist(s)

Women

Athlete	Event	Ranking round		Round of 32	Round of 16	Quarterfinals	Semifinals	Finals	
Athlete	Event	Score	Seed	Opposition score	Opposition score	Opposition score	Opposition score	Opposition score	Rank
Miroslava Cerna	Women's individual recurve	442	18	Kuncova (CZE); L 6-2	Did not advance				
Lenka Kuncova	Women's individual recurve	483	15	Cerna (CZE); W 6-2	Mijno (ITA); L 3-7	Did not advance			
Marketa Sidkova	Women's individual recurve	488	14	Valiyeva (AZE); W 6-0	Xiao Y (CHN); W 6-2	Li J (CHN); L 5-6	Did not advance		
Miroslava Cerna; Lenka Kuncova; Marketa Sidkova	Women's team recurve	1413	7	—N/a		Iran (IRI); L 167-189	Did not advance		

== Boccia ==
=== Individual events ===
Athlete	Event	Seeding matches	Round of 32	Round of 16	Quarterfinals	Semifinals	Finals	
Athlete	Event	Opposition Score	Opposition Score	Opposition Score	Opposition Score	Opposition Score	Opposition Score	Rank
Frantisek Serbus	Mixed individual BC2	Mezik (SVK); L 2-7	Kral (SVK); W 5-1	Hiu (HKG); L 0-12	Did not advance			
Leos Lacina	Mixed individual BC4	—N/a		Pinto (BRA); L 2-4	Did not advance			
Radek Prochazka	Mixed individual BC4	—N/a		Dueso Villar (ESP); W 6-4	S McGuire (GBR); L 3-5	5th-8th place matches P McGuire (GBR); W 6-4	5th-6th place match Yuk (HKG); L 2-6	6

=== Pairs event ===
Athlete	Event	Pool matches				Semifinals	Finals	
Athlete	Event	Opposition Score	Opposition Score	Opposition Score	Rank	Opposition Score	Opposition Score	Rank
Leos Lacina; Radek Prochazka	Pairs BC4	Pinto / dos Santos (BRA); L 0-9	Lau / Yuk (HKG); W 6-5	Barroso / Vieira (POR); W 6-1	2 Q	Dispaltro / Vandervies (CAN); W 3-3	Pinto / dos Santos (BRA); L 3-5	2nd place, silver medalist(s)

== See also ==
- Czech Republic at the Paralympics
- Czech Republic at the 2012 Summer Olympics
