= Archery at the 2008 Summer Paralympics – Women's team recurve =

The Women's team recurve open was one of the events held in archery at the 2008 Summer Paralympics in Beijing. Teams consisted of three archers who had competed in either the Standing or W1/W2 individual events. Team ranking was based on the aggregate individual ranking scores: in the knockout matches each team shot 24 arrows.

== Results ==
Women's team recurve Open at the XIII Paralympic Games
- Paralympic Archery
- Venue: Olympic Green Archery Field
- Dates: 15 September
- Competitors: 8

Medalists
1st place, gold medalist(s)		Fu Hongzhi; Gao Fangxia; Xiao Yanhong	China
2nd place, silver medalist(s)		Kim Ki Hee; Kim Ran Sook; Lee Hwa Sook	South Korea
3rd place, bronze medalist(s)		Miroslava Cerna; Lenka Kuncova; Marketa Sidkova	Czech Republic

The event was won by the team representing China.

=== Ranking Round ===
Rank	Nation	Archers	Scores	Total	Notes
1	China	Fu Hongzhi; Gao Fangxia; Xiao Yanhong	600; 593; 611	1804	WR
2	South Korea	Kim Ki Hee; Kim Ran Sook; Lee Hwa Sook	567; 564; 614	1745	
3	Japan	Yae Yamakawa; Ayako Saitoh; Kimiko Konishi	561; 543; 536	1640	
4	Ukraine	Roksolana Dzoba; Bohdana Nikitenko; Iryna Volynets	519; 536; 562	1617	
5	Poland	Wieslawa Wolak; Malgorzata Olejnik; Alicja Bukańska	513; 541; 533	1587	
6	Czech Republic	Miroslava Cerna; Lenka Kuncova; Marketa Sidkova	476; 515; 593	1584	
7	Great Britain	Kate Murray; Kay Lucas; Kathy Critchlow-Smith	545; 535; 498	1578	
8	Germany	Maria Droste; Katharina Schett; Tanja Schultz	496; 520; 524	1540	

=== Competition bracket ===
Quarter-finals
China	187
Germany	165
Poland	166
Ukraine	162
Japan	167
Czech Republic	174
Great Britain	161
South Korea	178

Semi-finals
China	194
Poland	178
Czech Republic	184
South Korea	199

Final
China	205
South Korea	177
Third place
Poland	182
Czech Republic	184
