= Archery at the 2008 Summer Paralympics – Women's individual recurve =

The women's individual recurve was one of the events held in archery at the 2008 Summer Paralympics in Beijing. There were two classes: a class for W1 & W2 wheelchair competitors and a class for standing archers. In the ranking round each archer shot 72 arrows; in the knockout stages each match was 12 arrows each.

== W1/W2 ==
Women's individual recurve W1/W2 at the XIII Paralympic Games
- Paralympic Archery
- Venue: Olympic Green Archery Field
- Dates: 9–14 September 2008
- Competitors: 20 from 10 nations

Medalists
1st place, gold medalist(s)		Gizem Girismen	Turkey
2nd place, silver medalist(s)		Fu Hongzhi	China
3rd place, bronze medalist(s)		Xiao Yanhong	China

The W1/W2 class was won by Gizem Girismen, representing Turkey.

=== Ranking round ===
Rank	Archer	Score	10's	X's	Notes
1	Xiao Yanhong (CHN)	611	12	4	WR
2	Fu Hongzhi (CHN)	600	15	6	
3	Marketa Sidkova (CZE)	593	11	2	
4	Gizem Girismen (TUR)	590	14	3	
5	Iryna Volynets (UKR)	562	8	2	
6	Lelia Maufras du Chatelliet (FRA)	557	10	4	
7	Cao Xuerong (CHN)	554	9	2	
8	Kate Murray (GBR)	545	7	4	
9	Ayako Saitoh (JPN)	543	6	2	
10	Tanja Schulz (GER)	524	4	1	
11	Elisabetta Mijno (ITA)	519	6	1	
12	Roksolana Dzoba (UKR)	519	5	2	
13	Lenka Kuncova (CZE)	515	1	0	
14	Hanife Ozturk (TUR)	503	3	1	
15	Kathy Critchlow-Smith (GBR)	498	2	0	
16	Maria Droste (GER)	496	4	3	
17	Miroslava Cerna (CZE)	476	6	0	
18	Larysa Mikhnyeva (UKR)	451	3	1	
19	Aya Nakanishi (JPN)	447	4	0	
20	Lyne Tremblay (CAN)	317	0	0	

=== Competition bracket ===
Round of 32
Miroslava Cerna (CZE)	87
Maria Droste (GER)	89
Lenka Kuncova (CZE)	84
Lyne Tremblay (CAN)	49
Aya Nakanishi (JPN)	82
Hanife Ozturk (TUR)	78
Kathy Critchlow-Smith (GBR)	83
Larysa Mikhnyeva (UKR)	70

Round of 16
Xiao Yanhong (CHN)	91
Maria Droste (GER)	66
Ayako Saitoh (JPN)	86
Kate Murray (GBR)	76
Iryna Volynets (UKR)	83
Roksolana Dzoba (UKR)	87
Lenka Kuncova (CZE)	85
Gizem Girismen (TUR)	103
Marketa Sidkova (CZE)	74
Aya Nakanishi (JPN)	82
Elisabetta Mijno (ITA)	94
Lelia Maufras du Chatellier (FRA)	98
Cao Xuerong (CHN)	79
Tanja Schultz (GER)	65
Kathy Critchlow-Smith (GBR)	75
Fu Hongzhi (CHN)	97

Quarterfinals
Xiao Yanhong (CHN)	96
Ayako Saitoh (JPN)	90
Roksolana Dzoba (UKR)	83
Gizem Girismen (TUR)	99
Aya Nakanishi (JPN)	90
Lelia Maufras du Chatellier (FRA)	84
Cao Xuerong (CHN)	81
Fu Hongzhi (CHN)	99

Semifinals
Xiao Yanhong (CHN)	93
Gizem Girismen (TUR)	95
Aya Nakanishi (JPN)	76
Fu Hongzhi (CHN)	82

Final
Gizem Girismen (TUR)	91
Fu Hongzhi (CHN)	85
Third place
Xiao Yanhong (CHN)	98
Aya Nakanishi (JPN)	94

== Standing ==
Women's individual recurve Standing at the XIII Paralympic Games
- Paralympic Archery
- Venue: Olympic Green Archery Field
- Dates: 9–13 September
- Competitors: 20 from 13 nations

Medalists
1st place, gold medalist(s)		Lee Hwa Sook	South Korea
2nd place, silver medalist(s)		Gao Fangxia	China
3rd place, bronze medalist(s)		Lindsey Carmichael	United States

The Standing class was won by Lee Hwa Sook, representing South Korea.

=== Ranking round ===
Rank	Archer	Score	10's	X's	Notes
1	Lee Hwa-sook (KOR)	614	15	6	WR
2	Gao Fangxia (CHN)	593	9	3	
3	Brigitte Duboc (FRA)	572	12	3	
4	Magali Comte (SUI)	571	10	1	
5	Kim Ki-hee (KOR)	567	18	5	
6	Kim Ran-sook (KOR)	564	10	6	
7	Byambasuren Javzmaa (MGL)	563	8	3	
8	Yae Yamakawa (JPN)	561	6	3	
9	Eliane Salden-Otten (NED)	560	6	3	
10	Anna Tzika (GRE)	550	5	2	
11	Małgorzata Olejnik (POL)	541	6	2	
12	Kimiko Konishi (JPN)	536	9	1	
13	Lindsey Carmichael (USA)	536	4	2	
14	Bohdana Nikitenko (UKR)	536	2	1	
15	Kay Lucas (GBR)	535	1	0	
16	Yan Huilian (CHN)	534	5	2	
17	Alicja Bukanska (POL)	533	5	0	
18	Katharina Schett (GER)	520	4	0	
19	Wieslawa Wolak (POL)	513	4	2	
20	Wang Yanhong (CHN)	495	6	4	

=== Competition bracket ===
Round of 32
Alicja Bukanska (POL)	96
Yan Huilian (CHN)	98
Lindsey Carmichael (USA)	89
Wang Yanhong (CHN)	82
Wieslawa Wolak (POL)	79
Bohdana Nikitenko (UKR)	82
Kay Lucas (GBR)	85
Katharina Schett (GER)	70

Round of 16
Lee Hwa Sook (KOR)	101
Yan Huilian (CHN)	97
Eliane Salden-Otten (NED)	93
Yae Yamakawa (JPN)	90
Kim Ki Hee (KOR)	85
Kimiko Konishi (JPN)	79
Lindsey Carmichael (USA)	87
Magali Comte (SUI)	76
Brigitte Duboc (FRA)	99
Bohdana Nikitenko (UKR)	78
Małgorzata Olejnik (POL)	98
Kim Ran Sook (KOR)	85
Byambasuren Javzmaa (MGL)	85
Anna Tzika (GRE)	90
Kay Lucas (GBR)	89
Gao Fangxia (CHN)	89

Quarterfinals
Lee Hwa Sook (KOR)	107
Eliane Salden-Otten (NED)	96
Kim Ki Hee (KOR)	85
Lindsey Carmichael (USA)	86
Brigitte Duboc (FRA)	88
Małgorzata Olejnik (POL)	101
Anna Tzika (GRE)	83
Gao Fangxia (CHN)	106

Semifinals
Lee Hwa Sook (KOR)	101
Lindsey Carmichael (USA)	101
Małgorzata Olejnik (POL)	85
Gao Fangxia (CHN)	98

Final
Lee Hwa Sook (KOR)	103
Gao Fangxia (CHN)	92
Third place
Lindsey Carmichael (USA)	105
Małgorzata Olejnik (POL)	101
