= Iran at the 2012 Summer Paralympics =

- IPC code: IRI
- NPC: I.R. Iran National Paralympic Committee
- Website: www.paralympic.ir

in London
- Competitors: 79 in 13 sports
- Flag bearer: Abdolreza Jokar
- Medals Ranked 11th: Gold 10 Silver 7 Bronze 7 Total 24

Summer Paralympics appearances (overview)
- 1988; 1992; 1996; 2000; 2004; 2008; 2012; 2016; 2020; 2024

Iran competed at the 2012 Summer Paralympics in London, United Kingdom, from 29 August to 9 September 2012.

== Competitors ==
Sport	Men	Women	Total
Archery	3	3	6
Athletics	14	2	16
Cycling	1		1
Football 5-a-side	10		10
Football 7-a-side	12		12
Goalball	4		4
Judo	6		6
Powerlifting	8		8
Shooting		2	2
Swimming	1		1
Table tennis	1		1
Volleyball	11		11
Wheelchair tennis	1		1
Total	72	7	79

== Medalists ==
Medals by sport
Sport	Gold medal	Silver medal	Bronze medal	Total
Athletics	5	5	3	13
Powerlifting	4	1	1	6
Archery	1	0	1	2
Sitting volleyball	0	1	0	1
Football 7-a-side	0	0	1	1
Shooting	0	0	1	1
Total	10	7	7	24

Medals by date
Day	Date	Gold medal	Silver medal	Bronze medal	Total
2	31 August	0	0	1	1
3	1 September	3	0	0	3
4	2 September	0	2	0	2
5	3 September	1	0	0	1
6	4 September	3	2	0	5
7	5 September	1	1	4	6
8	6 September	0	0	1	1
9	7 September	1	1	0	2
10	8 September	1	1	0	2
11	9 September	0	0	1	1
Total		10	7	7	24

Medal	Name	Sport	Event	Date
Gold	Zahra Nemati	Archery	Women's individual recurve W1/W2	4 September
Gold	Peyman Nasiri	Athletics	Men's 1500 m T20	4 September
Gold	Jalil Bagheri Jeddi	Athletics	Men's shot put F54/55/56	1 September
Gold	Javad Hardani	Athletics	Men's discus throw F37/38	7 September
Gold	Mohsen Kaedi	Athletics	Men's javelin throw F33/34	1 September
Gold	Mohammad Khalvandi	Athletics	Men's javelin throw F57/58	8 September
Gold	Nader Moradi	Powerlifting	Men's 60 kg	1 September
Gold	Ali Hosseini	Powerlifting	Men's 75 kg	3 September
Gold	Majid Farzin	Powerlifting	Men's 82.5 kg	4 September
Gold	Siamand Rahman	Powerlifting	Men's +100 kg	5 September
Silver	Mohsen Kaedi	Athletics	Men's shot put F34	4 September
Silver	Mehrdad Karam Zadeh	Athletics	Men's discus throw F42	2 September
Silver	Sajad Nikparast	Athletics	Men's javelin throw F12/13	5 September
Silver	Kamran Shokrisalari	Athletics	Men's javelin throw F42	7 September
Silver	Abdolreza Jokar	Athletics	Men's javelin throw F52/53	4 September
Silver	Rouhollah Rostami	Powerlifting	Men's 67.5 kg	2 September
Silver	Volleyball team: Majid Lashgari; Reza Peidayesh; Davood Alipourian; Ahmad Eiri; Naser Hassanpour; Sadegh Bigdeli; Jalil Eimery (captain); Seyed Saeid Ebrahimi; Isa Zirahi; Ramezan Salehi; Mohammad Khaleghi	Volleyball	Men's volleyball	8 September
Bronze	Razieh Shir Mohammadi; Zahra Javanmard; Zahra Nemati	Archery	Women's team recurve open	5 September
Bronze	Javad Hardani	Athletics	Men's shot put F37/38	5 September
Bronze	Ali Mohammadyari	Athletics	Men's discus throw F54/55/56	5 September
Bronze	Farzad Sepahvand	Athletics	Men's discus throw F44	6 September
Bronze	Football 7-a-side team: Mehran Nikoee Majd; Moslem Khazaeipirsarabi; Ehsan Gholamhosseinpour; Morteza Heidari; Bahman Ansari; Hashem Rastegarimobin; Sadegh Hassani Baghi; Farzad Mehri; Jasem Bakhshi; Moslem Akbari (captain); Rasoul Atashafrouz; Abdolreza Karimizadeh	Football 7-a-side	Football 7-a-side	9 September
Bronze	Ali Sadeghzadeh	Powerlifting	Men's 100 kg	5 September
Bronze	Sareh Javanmardi	Shooting	Women's 10 m air pistol SH1	31 August

== Archery ==
Men

Athlete	Event	Ranking round		Round of 32	Round of 16	Quarterfinals	Semifinals	Finals	
Athlete	Event	Score	Seed	Opposition score	Opposition score	Opposition score	Opposition score	Opposition score	Rank
Amin Alikhani Nezhad	Individual recurve standing	588	18	Kim (KOR); L 2–6	did not advance				
Ebrahim Ranjbar	Individual recurve W1/W2	648	2	Bye	Chopyk (UKR); W 7–1	Shahabipour (IRI); W 7–1	Sanawi (MAS); L 5–6	Tseng (TPE); L 3–7	4
Roham Shahabipour	Individual recurve W1/W2	603	7	Bye	Ozen (TUR); W 6–0	Ranjbar (IRI); L 1–7	did not advance		
Amin Alikhani Nezhad; Ebrahim Ranjbar; Roham Shahabipour	Team recurve open	1839	4	—N/a	Bye	South Korea (KOR); L 192–201	did not advance		

Women

Athlete	Event	Ranking round		Round of 32	Round of 16	Quarterfinals	Semifinals	Finals	
Athlete	Event	Score	Seed	Opposition score	Opposition score	Opposition score	Opposition score	Opposition score	Rank
Razieh Shir Mohammadi	Individual recurve standing	552	5	Bye	Comte (SUI); L 2–6	did not advance			
Zahra Javanmard	Individual recurve standing	481	15	Walmsley (GBR); L 0–6	did not advance				
Zahra Nemati	Individual recurve W1/W2	613 PR	1	Bye	Perna (ITA); W 6–0	Girismen (TUR); W 6–0	Floreno (ITA); W 6–0	Mijno (ITA); W 7–3	1st place, gold medalist(s)
Razieh Shir Mohammadi; Zahra Javanmard; Zahra Nemati	Team recurve open	1646	3	—N/a		Czech Republic (CZE); W 190–167	South Korea (KOR); L 186–192	Italy (ITA); W 188–184	3rd place, bronze medalist(s)

== Athletics ==
Men

Track events

Athlete	Events	Heat		Semifinal		Final	
Athlete	Events	Time	Rank	Time	Rank	Time	Rank
Peyman Nasiri	1500 m T20	—N/a				3:58.49	1st place, gold medalist(s)

Field events

Athlete	Event	Result	Rank
Salman Abbariki	Shot put F34	NM	16
Mohsen Kaedi	Shot put F34	12.94 m AS	2nd place, silver medalist(s)
Mohsen Kaedi	Javelin throw F33/34	38.30 m WR	1st place, gold medalist(s)
Javad Hardani	Shot put F37/38	15.43 m AS	3rd place, bronze medalist(s)
Javad Hardani	Discus throw F37/38	1024 pts WR	1st place, gold medalist(s)
Jalil Bagheri Jeddi	Shot put F54/55/56	988 pts PR	1st place, gold medalist(s)
Jalal Khakzadiyeh	Discus throw F32/33/34	936 pts	9
Mehrdad Karam Zadeh	Discus throw F42	44.62 m	2nd place, silver medalist(s)
Farzad Sepahvand	Discus throw F44	58.39 m	3rd place, bronze medalist(s)
Ali Mohammadyari	Discus throw F54/55/56	978 pts	3rd place, bronze medalist(s)
Sajad Nikparast	Javelin throw F12/13	63.15 m	2nd place, silver medalist(s)
Seyed Erfan Hosseini	Javelin throw F12/13	57.94 m	4
Kamran Shokrisalari	Javelin throw F42	52.06 m	2nd place, silver medalist(s)
Abdolreza Jokar	Javelin throw F52/53	920 pts	2nd place, silver medalist(s)
Mohammad Khalvandi	Javelin throw F57/58	50.98 m WR	1st place, gold medalist(s)

Women

Field events

Athlete	Event	Result	Rank
Hajar Taktaz	Shot put F11/12	970 pts	5
Marziyeh Sedighi	Shot put F54/55/56	837	9

== Cycling ==
Road

Athlete	Event	Time	Rank
Bahman Golbarnezhad	Men's road race C4-5	did not finish	
Bahman Golbarnezhad	Men's time trial C4	did not start	

Track

Athlete	Event	Time	Rank
Bahman Golbarnezhad	Men's 1 km time trial C4-5	1:13.799	18

== Football 5-a-side ==
The following is the Iran squad in the football 5-a-side tournament of the 2012 Summer Paralympics.

No.	Pos.	Player	Age	Club
1	GK	Morteza Maboodi Dalivand	32	Gilan
2	DF	Amir Pourrazavi Haftdaran	27	Azarbayejan Sharghi
3	DF	Maghsoud Gholizadeh Abdoljabbar	30	Azarbayejan Sharghi
4	FW	Mohammad Keshtkar	28	Fars
7	FW	Abdolhamid Shalhavizadeh	25	Khoozestan
8	DF	Mohammad Heidari	28	Khoozestan
9	FW	Hossein Rajab Pour	25	Khoozestan
10	FW	Behzad Zadaliasghari Yengejeh	24	Azarbayejan Sharghi
11	FW	Ahmadreza Shah Hosseini Ardekani	22	Fars
12	GK	Meysam Shojaeiyan	23	Fars

Group play

Pos	Team	Pld	W	D	L	GF	GA	GD	Pts	Qualification
1	Spain (ESP)	3	1	2	0	3	1	+2	5	Qualified for the medal round
2	Argentina (ARG)	3	1	2	0	2	0	+2	5	Qualified for the medal round
3	Iran (IRI)	3	1	0	2	1	4	−3	3	Qualified for the classification round
4	Great Britain (GBR)	3	0	2	1	1	2	−1	2	Qualified for the classification round

31 August 2012
13:30

Iran	0–2	Argentina
	Report	Velo 27', 48'

Riverbank Arena
Attendance: 1,985
Referee: François Carcouët (France)

2 September 2012
13:30

Spain	2–0	Iran
Martín Gaitán 13', 22'	Report

Riverbank Arena
Attendance: 1,996
Referee: Lucio Morgado (Brazil)

4 September 2012
15:30

Great Britain	0–1	Iran
	Report	Ardekani 21' (pen.)

Riverbank Arena
Attendance: 2,273
Referee: François Carcouët (France)

5th–8th place semi-final

6 September 2012
11:00

Iran	1–0	Turkey
Rajab Pour 19'	Report

Riverbank Arena
Attendance: 1,510
Referee: Niels Haupt (Germany)

5th–6th place match

8 September 2012
11:15

Iran	0–0 (a.e.t.)	China
	Report
Penalties
Shalhavizadeh (penalty missed); Ardekani (penalty missed); Haftdaran (penalty missed)	0–1	(penalty missed) Zhoubin; (penalty scored) Yafeng; (penalty missed) Dongdong

Riverbank Arena
Attendance: 1,603
Referee: François Carcouët (France)

Rank: 6th

== Football 7-a-side ==
The following is the Iran squad in the football 7-a-side tournament of the 2012 Summer Paralympics.

No.	Pos.	Player	Age	Club
1	GK	Mehran Nikoee Majd	30	Gilan
2	MF	Hashem Rastegarimobin	27	Zanjan
5	MF	Sadegh Hassani Baghi	28	Gilan
6	MF	Farzad Mehri	27	Zanjan
7	MF	Jasem Bakhshi	25	Gilan
8	DF	Ehsan Gholamhosseinpour Bousheh	23	Fars
9	DF	Morteza Heidari	34	Tehran
10	DF	Bahman Ansari	32	Markazi
11	FW	Rasoul Atashafrouz	30	Gilan
13	MF	Moslem Akbari	27	Gilan
19	FW	Abdolreza Karimizadeh	30	Khoozestan
22	GK	Moslem Khazaeipirsarabi	25	Kermanshah

Group play

Pos	Team	Pld	W	D	L	GF	GA	GD	Pts	Qualification
1	Russia (RUS)	3	3	0	0	19	1	+18	9	Qualified for the medal round
2	Iran (IRI)	3	2	0	1	13	5	+8	6	Qualified for the medal round
3	Netherlands (NED)	3	1	0	2	5	13	−8	3	Qualified for the classification round
4	Argentina (ARG)	3	0	0	3	2	20	−18	0	Qualified for the classification round

2012-09-01
11:15

Netherlands	1–4	Iran
Straatman 52'	Report	Mehri 4'; Akbari 27'; Karimizadeh 30'; Ansari 60+6'

Riverbank Arena
Attendance: 4,405
Referee: Ross Haswell (GBR)

2012-09-03
14:00

Argentina	1–8	Iran
Fernández Romano 47'	Report	Gholamhosseinpour 2', 60+3'; Mehri 6', 58'; Atashafrouz 13', 14'; Bakhshi 18'; Heidari 29'

Riverbank Arena
Attendance: 10,561
Referee: Garry Polkey (GBR)

2012-09-05
9:00

Iran	1–3	Russia
Mehri 36' (pen.)	Report	Kuligin 18'; Larionov 37'; Ramonov 46'

Riverbank Arena
Attendance: 4,276
Referee: Keith Stroud (GBR)

Semi-final

2012-09-07
17:30

Ukraine	2–1	Iran
Dotsenko 37'; Shkvarlo 57'	Report	Bakhshi 51'

Riverbank Arena
Attendance: 2,900
Referee: Stephen Conroy (GBR)

Bronze medal match

2012-09-09
13:30

Brazil	0–5	Iran
	Report	Atashafrouz 17', 23'; Mehri 20', 60+1'; Bakhshi 57'

Riverbank Arena
Attendance: 11,197
Referee: Kevin Wright (GBR)

Rank: (bronze)

== Goalball ==
=== Men's tournament ===
Squad list	Group stage		Quarterfinals	Semifinals	Finals	
Squad list	Opposition Result	Rank	Opposition Result	Opposition Result	Opposition Result	Rank
From: Seyed Mehdi Sayahi; Mostafa Shahbazi; Hassan Jafari; Javad Shirdel	China; W 9–5	1	Finland; L 1–5	did not advance		
From: Seyed Mehdi Sayahi; Mostafa Shahbazi; Hassan Jafari; Javad Shirdel	Canada; W 9–2	1	Finland; L 1–5	did not advance		
From: Seyed Mehdi Sayahi; Mostafa Shahbazi; Hassan Jafari; Javad Shirdel	Belgium; L 6–8	1	Finland; L 1–5	did not advance		
From: Seyed Mehdi Sayahi; Mostafa Shahbazi; Hassan Jafari; Javad Shirdel	South Korea; W 4–3	1	Finland; L 1–5	did not advance		
From: Seyed Mehdi Sayahi; Mostafa Shahbazi; Hassan Jafari; Javad Shirdel	Algeria; W 4–2	1	Finland; L 1–5	did not advance		

Group B

Team	Pld	W	D	L	GF	GA	GD	Pts	Qualification
Iran	5	4	0	1	32	20	+12	12	Quarterfinals
China	5	3	1	1	20	14	+6	10	Quarterfinals
Belgium	5	3	1	1	19	16	+3	10	Quarterfinals
Algeria	5	2	0	3	18	17	+1	6	Quarterfinals
South Korea	5	1	0	4	18	28	−10	3	Eliminated
Canada	5	1	0	4	16	28	−12	3	Eliminated

Source: "London 2012 Paralympic Games - Goalball results" (PDF). Paralympic.org. 2012-10-03 – via Goalball.sport.

30 August 2012; 13:45	China	5 – 9	Iran	Copper Box, London; Referees: Launel Scott (CAN), Bülent Kimyon (TUR)
30 August 2012; 13:45	Yao 3 Chen 2	Report	Sayahi 9	Copper Box, London; Referees: Launel Scott (CAN), Bülent Kimyon (TUR)

31 August 2012; 19:45	Iran	9 – 2	Canada	Copper Box, London; Referees: Dina Murdie (GBR), Tony Connolly (USA)
31 August 2012; 19:45	Jafari 4 Sayahi 3 Shahbazi 1 Shirdel 1	Report	Gaulin 2	Copper Box, London; Referees: Dina Murdie (GBR), Tony Connolly (USA)

1 September 2012; 18:30	Belgium	8 – 6	Iran	Copper Box, London; Referees: Morten Hammershoi (DEN), Juha Vuokila (FIN)
1 September 2012; 18:30	de Rick 3 Bihi 3 Vanhove 1 Mapreni 1	Report	Sayahi 3 Jafari 2 Shahbazi 1	Copper Box, London; Referees: Morten Hammershoi (DEN), Juha Vuokila (FIN)

2 September 2012; 13:45	Iran	4 – 3	South Korea	Copper Box, London; Referees: Janne Ahokas (FIN), Dawna Christy (CAN)
2 September 2012; 13:45	Sayahi 4	Report	Hong SW 2 Kim CH 1	Copper Box, London; Referees: Janne Ahokas (FIN), Dawna Christy (CAN)

3 September 2012; 10:15	Iran	4 – 2	Algeria	Copper Box, London; Referees: Dina Murdie (GBR), Tony Connolly (USA)
3 September 2012; 10:15	Sayahi 2 Jafari 1 Shirdel 1	Report	Mokrane 2	Copper Box, London; Referees: Dina Murdie (GBR), Tony Connolly (USA)

Quarter-final

5 September 2012; 21:00	Iran	1 – 5	Finland	Copper Box, London; Referees: Morten Hammershoi (DEN), Kimberly Anderson (USA)
5 September 2012; 21:00	Sayahi 1	Report	Posio 3 Mattila 2	Copper Box, London; Referees: Morten Hammershoi (DEN), Kimberly Anderson (USA)

== Judo ==
Athlete	Event	Preliminaries	Quarterfinals	Semifinals	Repechage First round	Repechage Final	Final / BM	
Athlete	Event	Opposition Result	Opposition Result	Opposition Result	Opposition Result	Opposition Result	Opposition Result	Rank
Saeid Rahmati	Men's 66 kg	Falcon (VEN); L 000H–100	did not advance					
Mohammad Ali Shanani	Men's 73 kg	Solovey (UKR); L 000–101	did not advance		Powell (GBR); W 1103–0101	Takahashi (JPN); L 0001–100	did not advance	
Seyed Amir Nattaj	Men's 81 kg	Cimciler (TUR); W 020–0001	Effron (ARG); L 0012–0112	did not advance	Bye	Shevchenko (RUS); L 0003–010	did not advance	
Hani Asakereh	Men's 90 kg	Bye	Kretsul (RUS); L 0001–100	did not advance	G Tapia (MEX); W 100–000	Dashtseren (MGL); W 100–000	Lencina (ARG); L 0001–100	5
Hamed Alizadeh	Men's 100 kg	Bye	Upmann (GER); W 010–0003	GG Choi (KOR); L 0001–100	Bye		Tenorio (BRA); L 0104–1003	5
Hamzeh Nadri	Men's +100 kg	Bye	Silva (BRA); L 000–0011	did not advance	Papp (HUN); W 001–0002	JM Park (KOR); W 100–0004	Dominguez (CUB); L 0003–0101	5

== Powerlifting ==
Athlete	Event	Total lifted	Rank
Amir Jafari	Men's 56 kg	173 kg	6
Nader Moradi	Men's 60 kg	196 kg	1st place, gold medalist(s)
Rouhollah Rostami	Men's 67.5 kg	208 kg	2nd place, silver medalist(s)
Ali Hosseini	Men's 75 kg	225 kg	1st place, gold medalist(s)
Majid Farzin	Men's 82.5 kg	237 kg	1st place, gold medalist(s)
Seyed Hamed Solhipour	Men's 90 kg	225 kg	4
Ali Sadeghzadeh	Men's 100 kg	235 kg	3rd place, bronze medalist(s)
Siamand Rahman	Men's +100 kg	280 kg PR	1st place, gold medalist(s)

== Shooting ==
Women

Athlete	Event	Qualification		Final	
Athlete	Event	Score	Rank	Score	Rank
Sareh Javanmardi	Women's 10 m air pistol SH1	376	3	469.0	3rd place, bronze medalist(s)
Alieh Mahmoudi	Women's 10 m air pistol SH1	374	4	467.1	6

== Volleyball ==
=== Men's tournament ===
Overview

Team	Group stage		Quarterfinals	Semifinals	Finals	
Team	Opposition Result	Rank	Opposition Result	Opposition Result	Opposition Result	Rank
Iran	Rwanda; W 3–0	1	Great Britain; W 3–0	Russia; W 3–0	Bosnia and Herzegovina; L 1–3	2nd place, silver medalist(s)
Iran	China; W 3–0	1	Great Britain; W 3–0	Russia; W 3–0	Bosnia and Herzegovina; L 1–3	2nd place, silver medalist(s)
Iran	Brazil; W 3–0	1	Great Britain; W 3–0	Russia; W 3–0	Bosnia and Herzegovina; L 1–3	2nd place, silver medalist(s)
Iran	Bosnia and Herzegovina; W 3–1	1	Great Britain; W 3–0	Russia; W 3–0	Bosnia and Herzegovina; L 1–3	2nd place, silver medalist(s)

Roster

The following is the Iranian roster in the men's volleyball tournament of the 2012 Summer Paralympics.

Head coach: Hadi Rezaei

№	Name	Date of birth	Position	2012 club
2	Majid Lashgarisanami	6 August 1979	UN	(Iran) Gostareshe Foulad
3	Reza Peidayesh	5 September 1978	WS	(Iran) Dokhaniyat
4	Davood Alipourian	6 May 1985	SE	(Iran) Zob Ahan
5	Ahmad Eiri	21 March 1988	M	(Iran) Gostareshe Foulad
6	Naser Hassanpour Alinazari	30 March 1974	UN	(Iran) Gonbad
7	Sadegh Bigdeli	26 February 1984	WS	(Iran) Gostareshe Foulad
8	Jalil Eimery	21 September 1972	SE	(Iran) Zob Ahan
9	Seyedsaeid Ebrahimibaladezaei	1 July 1979	OS	(Iran) Zob Ahan
10	Isa Zirahi	4 June 1979	OS	(Iran) Zob Ahan
11	Ramezan Salehi Hajikolaei	11 March 1979	L	(Iran) Zob Ahan
12	Mohammad Khaleghi	23 October 1981	SE	(Iran) Gostareshe Foulad

Group play

Pos	Team	Pld	W	L	Pts	SW	SL	SR	SPW	SPL	SPR
1	Iran	4	4	0	8	12	1	12.000	322	207	1.556
2	Bosnia and Herzegovina	4	3	1	7	10	3	3.333	309	240	1.288
3	Brazil	4	2	2	6	6	6	1.000	257	230	1.117
4	China	4	1	3	5	3	9	0.333	243	266	0.914
5	Rwanda	4	0	4	4	0	12	0.000	115	300	0.383

30 August 2012; 21:00	Iran	3–0	Rwanda	ExCeL London, London; Referees: Janko Plešnik (SLO), Dee Wauchope (GBR)
30 August 2012; 21:00	(25–11, 25–6, 25–8); Report			ExCeL London, London; Referees: Janko Plešnik (SLO), Dee Wauchope (GBR)

1 September 2012; 14:00	Iran	3–0	China	ExCeL London, London; Referees: Dimosthenis Kostopoulos (GRE), Amin Al-Traifi (KSA)
1 September 2012; 14:00	(25–15, 25–19, 25–12); Report			ExCeL London, London; Referees: Dimosthenis Kostopoulos (GRE), Amin Al-Traifi (KSA)

3 September 2012; 14:00	Iran	3–0	Brazil	ExCeL London, London; Referees: Amin Al-Traifi (KSA), Mourad El-Baroudy (EGY)
3 September 2012; 14:00	(25–21, 25–15, 25–17); Report			ExCeL London, London; Referees: Amin Al-Traifi (KSA), Mourad El-Baroudy (EGY)

4 September 2012; 16:00	Iran	3–1	Bosnia and Herzegovina	ExCeL London, London; Referees: Report
4 September 2012; 16:00	(22–25, 25–18, 25–18, 25–22); Dariusz Jasinski (POL), Janko Plesnik (SLO)			ExCeL London, London; Referees: Report

Quarter-final

5 September 2012; 21:20	Great Britain	0–3	Iran	ExCeL London, London; Referees: Dimosthenis Kostopoulos (GRE), Ute Fisher (GER)
5 September 2012; 21:20	(18–25, 13–25, 15–25); Report			ExCeL London, London; Referees: Dimosthenis Kostopoulos (GRE), Ute Fisher (GER)

Semi-final

6 September 2012; 21:00	Russia	0–3	Iran	ExCeL London, London; Referees: Benno Meijer (NED), Ronaldo Chaves (BRA)
6 September 2012; 21:00	(15–25, 18–25, 18–25); Report			ExCeL London, London; Referees: Benno Meijer (NED), Ronaldo Chaves (BRA)

Final

8 September 2012; 18:00	Bosnia and Herzegovina	3–1	Iran	ExCeL London, London; Referees: Anton Probst (GER), Toomas Murulo (EST)
8 September 2012; 18:00	(19–25, 25–21, 25–22, 25–15); Report			ExCeL London, London; Referees: Anton Probst (GER), Toomas Murulo (EST)

== Swimming ==
Men

Athlete	Events	Heats		Final	
Athlete	Events	Time	Rank	Time	Rank
Shahin Izadyar	50 m freestyle S10	25.97	5	did not advance	
Shahin Izadyar	100 m freestyle S10	57.91 AS	7	did not advance	
Shahin Izadyar	100 m breaststroke SB9	1:12.23	2	1:12.47	8
Shahin Izadyar	200 m individual medley SM10	2:28.51	7	did not advance	

== Table tennis ==
Men

Athlete	Event	Preliminaries			Quarterfinals	Semifinals	Finals	
Athlete	Event	Opposition Result	Opposition Result	Rank	Opposition Result	Opposition Result	Opposition Result	Rank
Hassan Janfeshan	Singles class 2	Kim (KOR); L 0–3	Ruep (AUT); W 3–1	2	did not advance			

== Wheelchair tennis ==
Men

Athlete	Event	Round of 64	Round of 32	Round of 16	Quarterfinals	Semifinals	Final / BM	
Athlete	Event	Opposition Score	Opposition Score	Opposition Score	Opposition Score	Opposition Score	Opposition Score	Rank
Hossein Mamipour	Men's singles	Jaroszewski (POL); L 2–6, 1–6	did not advance					
