= 2013 World Para-archery Championships =

- Location: Bangkok, Thailand
- Start date: 1 November 2013
- End date: 7 November 2013

The 2013 World Para-archery Championships were the 12th edition of the World Para Archery Championships. The event took place in Thailand between November 1-7.

== Medal table ==
* Host nation (Thailand)

| Rank | Nation | Gold | Silver | Bronze | Total |
|---|---|---|---|---|---|
| 1 | Russia (RUS) | 3 | 0 | 0 | 3 |
| 2 | Great Britain (GBR) | 2 | 3 | 2 | 7 |
| 3 | Turkey (TUR) | 2 | 0 | 0 | 2 |
| 4 | China (CHN) | 1 | 2 | 0 | 3 |
| 5 | Finland (FIN) | 1 | 1 | 0 | 2 |
| 5 | France (FRA) | 1 | 1 | 0 | 2 |
| 5 | Thailand (THA)* | 1 | 1 | 0 | 2 |
| 8 | Iran (IRI) | 1 | 0 | 1 | 2 |
| 8 | Poland (POL) | 1 | 0 | 1 | 2 |
| 10 | Ukraine (UKR) | 0 | 2 | 0 | 2 |
| 10 | United States (USA) | 0 | 2 | 0 | 2 |
| 12 | Italy (ITA) | 0 | 1 | 2 | 3 |
| 13 | Czech Republic (CZE) | 0 | 0 | 2 | 2 |
| 13 | South Korea (KOR) | 0 | 0 | 2 | 2 |
| 15 | Chinese Taipei (TPE) | 0 | 0 | 1 | 1 |
| 15 | Japan (JPN) | 0 | 0 | 1 | 1 |
| 15 | Slovakia (SVK) | 0 | 0 | 1 | 1 |
| Totals (17 entries) | | 13 | 13 | 13 | 39 |

== Medalists ==
=== Individual events ===
| Event | Gold | Silver | Bronze |
|---|---|---|---|
| Men's recurve W2 | Thailand; Hanreuchai Netsiri | Great Britain; Paul Browne | Chinese Taipei; Tseng Lung Hui |
| Men's recurve standing | Russia; Timur Tuchinov | Ukraine; Yuriy Kopiy | Czech Republic; Vaclav Kostal |
| Women's recurve W2 | Iran; Zahra Nemati | China; Xiao Yanhong | South Korea; Lee Mi Hyang |
| Women's recurve standing | France; Brigitte Duboc | China; Liang Qiurong | Poland; Milena Olszewska |
| Men's compound W1 | Finland; Jean-Pierre Antonios | United States; Jeff Fabry | Czech Republic; David Drahoninsky |
| Men's compound open | Great Britain; John Stubbs | Finland; Jere Forsberg | Italy; Gianpaolo Cancelli |
| Women's compound open | Turkey; Burcu Dag | Great Britain; Danielle Brown | Great Britain; Mel Clarke |

=== Team events ===
| Event | Gold | Silver | Bronze |
|---|---|---|---|
| Men's recurve team open | Russia; Oleg Shestakov; Bato Tsydendorzhiev; Timur Tuchinov | France; Armando Cabreira; Stephane Gilbert; Alexandre Lasvenes | Great Britain; Kenny Allen; Phillip Bottomley; Paul Browne |
| Women's recurve team open | China; Liang Qiurong; Ma Huan; Xiao Yanhong | Thailand; Priyaphon Kaeochaemchan; Wasana Khuthawisap; Phannibha Srathongmaew | South Korea; Jo Jang Moon; Kim Ran Sook; Lee Hwa Sook |
| Mixed recurve team open | Poland; Milena Olszewska; Piotr Sawicki | Ukraine; Roksolana Dzoba-Balyan; Yuriy Kopiy | Iran; Zahra Nemati; Gholamreza Rahimi |
| Men's compound team open | Great Britain; Richard Hennahane; Frank Maguire; John Stubbs | Italy; Matteo Bonacina; Gianpaolo Cancelli; Alberto Simonelli | Slovakia; Peter Kascak; Marian Marecak; Marcel Pavlik |
| Women's compound team open | Russia; Stepanida Artakhinova; Marina Lyzhnikova; Olga Polegaeva | United States; Martha Chavez; D Arce Hess; Ashlee Sheppard | Japan; Nako Hirasawa; Chieko Kamiya; Miho Nagano |
| Mixed compound team open | Turkey; Erdogan Aygan; Burcu Dag | Great Britain; Danielle Brown; John Stubbs | Italy; Eleonora Sarti; Alberto Simonelli |
