= Archery at the 2012 Summer Paralympics =

Archery at the XIV Paralympic Games
- Venue: Royal Artillery Barracks
- Dates: 30 August – 5 September 2012
- Competitors: 140

Archery at the 2012 Summer Paralympics consisted of nine events, five for men and four for women. The competitions were held at the Royal Artillery Barracks from 30 August to 5 September 2012.

== Classification ==
Archers were given a classification depending on the type and extent of their disability. The classification system allowed archers to compete against others with a similar level of function.

Archery classes are:

- Wheelchair 1 (W1)
- Wheelchair 2 (W2)
- Standing (ST)

== Competition schedule ==
R	Ranking round	E	Elimination rounds	¼	Quarterfinals	½	Semifinals	F	Final

Event↓/Date →	Thu 30	Fri 31	Sat 1	Sun 2	Mon 3		Tue 4		Wed 5		
Men's individual compound open	R	E		¼	½	F					
Men's individual compound W1	R	E	¼		½	F					
Men's individual recurve W1/W2	R	E	¼		½	F					
Men's individual recurve standing	R		E	¼	½	F					
Men's team recurve									¼	½	F
Women's individual compound open	R	E		¼			½	F			
Women's individual recurve W1/W2	R	E	¼				½	F			
Women's individual recurve standing	R		E	¼			½	F			
Women's team recurve									¼	½	F

== Participating nations ==
139 archers from 29 nations competed.

- Azerbaijan (1)
- Canada (5)
- China (7)
- Chinese Taipei (3)
- Czech Republic (8)
- Finland (5)
- France (5)
- Germany (4)
- Great Britain (13)
- Greece (1)
- Iran (6)
- Italy (10)
- Japan (3)
- Malaysia (3)
- Mexico (1)
- Mongolia (2)
- Netherlands (1)
- Norway (1)
- Poland (5)
- Russia (8)
- Slovakia (4)
- South Korea (9)
- Spain (3)
- Sweden (2)
- Switzerland (2)
- Thailand (2)
- Turkey (11)
- Ukraine (7)
- United States (7)

== Medal summary ==
=== Medal table ===
Rank	Nation	Gold	Silver	Bronze	Total
1	Russia (RUS)	2	1	2	5
2	South Korea (KOR)	1	2	0	3
3	China (CHN)	1	1	2	4
4	Great Britain (GBR)	1	1	0	2
4	Italy (ITA)	1	1	0	2
4	United States (USA)	1	1	0	2
7	Iran (IRI)	1	0	1	2
8	Finland (FIN)	1	0	0	1
9	Czech Republic (CZE)	0	1	0	1
9	Malaysia (MAS)	0	1	0	1
11	Canada (CAN)	0	0	1	1
11	Chinese Taipei (TPE)	0	0	1	1
11	Poland (POL)	0	0	1	1
11	Turkey (TUR)	0	0	1	1
Totals (14 entries)		9	9	9	27

=== Men's events ===
Event	Class	Gold	Silver	Bronze
Individual compound	Open	Jere Forsberg; Finland	Matt Stutzman; United States	Doğan Hancı; Turkey
Individual compound	W1	Jeff Fabry; United States	David Drahonínský; Czech Republic	Norbert Murphy; Canada
Individual recurve	Standing	Timur Tuchinov; Russia	Oleg Shestakov; Russia	Mikhail Oyun; Russia
Individual recurve	W1/W2	Oscar De Pellegrin; Italy	Hasihin Sanawi; Malaysia	Lung Hui Tseng; Chinese Taipei
Team recurve	Open	Russia (RUS); Mikhail Oyun; Oleg Shestakov; Timur Tuchinov	South Korea (KOR); Jung Young Joo; Kim Suk Ho; Lee Myeong-Gu	China (CHN); Cheng Changjie; Dong Zhi; Li Zongshan

=== Women's events ===
Event	Class	Gold	Silver	Bronze
Individual compound	Open	Danielle Brown; Great Britain	Mel Clarke; Great Britain	Stepanida Artakhinova; Russia
Individual recurve	Standing	Huilian Yan; China	Hwa Sook Lee; South Korea	Milena Olszewska; Poland
Individual recurve	W1/W2	Zahra Nemati; Iran	Elisabetta Mijno; Italy	Jinzhi Li; China
Team recurve	Open	South Korea (KOR); Kim Ran Sook; Ko Hee Sook; Lee Hwa Sook	China (CHN); Gao Fangxia; Xiao Yanhong; Yan Huilian	Iran (IRI); Zahra Javanmard; Zahra Nemati; Razieh Shir Mohammadi

== See also ==
- Archery at the 2012 Summer Olympics
