= 2012 Summer Paralympics Parade of Nations =

Part of games opening ceremony

During the Parade of Nations at the opening ceremony of the 2012 Summer Paralympic Games, athletes from each participating country paraded in the Olympic Stadium, preceded by its flag. The flag was borne by a sportsperson from that country chosen either by the National Paralympic Committee or by the athletes themselves.

== Parade order ==
All nations paraded in alphabetical order except the host country, Great Britain, who entered last.

== Countries and flag bearers ==
The following is a list of all parading countries with their respective flag bearer, sorted in the order they appeared in the parade. This is sortable by country name under which they entered, the flag bearer's name, or the flag bearer's sport. Names are given as were officially designated by the IPC.

Order	Country	Flag bearer	Sport
1	Afghanistan (AFG)	Mohammad Fahim Rahimi	Powerlifting
2	Albania (ALB)	Haki Dakin	Cycling
3	Algeria (ALG)	Nadia Medjemedj	Athletics
4	Andorra (AND)	Jordi Casellas Albioc	—
5	Angola (ANG)	Maria Silva	Athletics
6	Antigua and Barbuda (ANT)	Jamol Pilgrim	Athletics
7	Argentina (ARG)	Guillermo Marro	Swimming
8	Armenia (ARM)	Greta Vardanyan	Powerlifting
9	Australia (AUS)	Greg Smith	Wheelchair rugby
10	Austria (AUT)	Stanislaw Fraczyk	Table tennis
11	Azerbaijan (AZE)	Ilham Zakiyev	Judo
12	Bahrain (BRN)	Ahmed Meshaima	Athletics
13	Barbados (BAR)	David Taylor	Swimming
14	Belarus (BLR)	Mikalai Bezyazychny	Wheelchair fencing
15	Belgium (BEL)	Gino De Keersmaeker	Athletics
16	Benin (BEN)	Constant Kponhinto	Athletics
17	Bermuda (BER)	Jessica Cooper Lewis	Athletics
18	Bosnia and Herzegovina (BIH)	Sabahuin Delalić	Sitting volleyball
19	Brazil (BRA)	Daniel Dias	Swimming
20	Brunei (BRU)	Shaki Jumaat	Athletics
21	Bulgaria (BUL)	Dechko Ovcharov	Athletics
22	Burkina Faso (BUR)	Kadidia Nikiema	Cycling
23	Burundi (BDI)	Remy Nikobimeze	Athletics
24	Cambodia (CAM)	Thin Senghon	Athletics
25	Cameroon (CMR)	Conrat Atangana	Powerlifting
26	Canada (CAN)	Garett Hickling	Wheelchair rugby
27	Cape Verde (CPV)	Marcio Miguel da Costa Fernandes	Athletics
28	Central African Republic (CAF)	Clemarot-Christian Nikova-Rosel	Athletics
29	Chile (CHI)	Cristian Valenzuela	Athletics
30	China (CHN)	Zhang Lixin	Athletics
31	Colombia (COL)	Elkin Alonso Serna Moreno	Athletics
32	Comoros (COM)	Ahamada Djae Hassani	Swimming
33	Costa Rica (CRC)		
34	Ivory Coast (CIV)	Carine Cynthia Amandine Tchei	Powerlifting
35	Croatia (CRO)	Darko Kray	Athletics
36	Cuba (CUB)	Omara Duran Elias	Athletics
37	Cyprus (CYP)	Karolina Pelentritov	Swimming
38	Czech Republic (CZE)	Rostislav Pohlomann	Athletics
39	North Korea (PRK)	Rim Ju Song	Swimming
40	Democratic Republic of the Congo (COD)	Dedeline Mibamba Kimbata	Athletics
41	Denmark (DEN)	Peter Rosenmeier	Table tennis
42	Djibouti (DJI)	Houssein Omar Hassan	Athletics
43	Dominican Republic (DOM)	Rodny Minier	Cycling
44	Ecuador (ECU)	Jessica Silvana Lalama Vega	Swimming
45	Egypt (EGY)	Metwally Mathana	Powerlifting
46	El Salvador (ESA)	Luis Morales Garcia	Athletics
47	Estonia (EST)	Are Eller	—
48	Ethiopia (ETH)	Tesfalem Gebru Gebede	Athletics
49	Faroe Islands (FRO)	Ragnvalour Jensen	Swimming
50	Fiji (FIJ)	Iliesa Delana	Athletics
51	Finland (FIN)	Leo Pekka Tahti	Athletics
52	Macedonia (MKD)	Branimir Jovanovski	Shooting
53	France (FRA)	Damien Seguin	Sailing
54	Gabon (GAB)	Thierry Mabicka	
55	The Gambia (GAM)	Isatou Nyiang	Athletics
56	Georgia (GEO)	Shota Omarashvili	Powerlifting
57	Germany (GER)	Daniela Schulte	Swimming
58	Ghana (GHA)	Raphael Bostoyo Nkegbe	Athletics
59	Greece (GRE)	Christos Tampaxis	Swimming
60	Guatemala (GUA)	Isaac Leiva Avila	Athletics
61	Guinea-Bissau (GBS)		
62	Haiti (HAI)	Nephtalie SN Louis	Athletics
63	Honduras (HON)	Luis Hernandez	
64	Hong Kong (HKG)	So Wa Wai	Athletics
65	Hungary (HUN)	Bernadett Biacsi	Athletics
66	Iceland (ISL)	Helgi Sveinsson	Athletics
67	India (IND)	Jagbur Singh	Athletics
68	Indonesia (INA)	Agus Ngaimin	Swimming
69	Iran (IRI)	Abdolreza Jokar	Athletics
70	Iraq (IRQ)	Faris Al-Ajeeli	Powerlifting
71	Ireland (IRL)	Cathal Miller	Cycling
72	Israel (ISR)	Doron Shaziri	Shooting
73	Italy (ITA)	Oscar de Pellegrin	Archery
74	Jamaica (JAM)	Tanto Campbell	Athletics
75	Japan (JPN)	Keiichi Kimura	Swimming
76	Jordan (JOR)	Amer Al-Abbadi	Shooting
77	Kazakhstan (KAZ)	Anuar Akhmetov	Swimming
78	Kenya (KEN)	Henry Kirwa	Athletics
79	South Korea (KOR)	Kim Gyu Dae	Athletics
80	Kuwait (KUW)	Hamad Aladwani	Athletics
81	Kyrgyzstan (KGZ)	Nurgul Osmonova	
82	Laos (LAO)	Eay Simay	Powerlifting
83	Latvia (LAT)	Andis Ozolnieks	Athletics
84	Lebanon (LIB)	Edward Maalouf	Cycling
85	Lesotho (LES)	Moretlo Mary Letsoara	Athletics
86	Liberia (LBR)	James Siaffa	Powerlifting
87	Libya (LBA)	Abdelrahim Busanan	—
88	Lithuania (LTU)	Rolandas Urbonas	Athletics
89	Macau (MAC)	In I Lao	Wheelchair fencing
90	Madagascar (MAD)	Raherinandrasana Revelinot	Athletics
91	Malaysia (MAS)	Muhammad Ziyad Zolkefli	Athletics
92	Mali (MLI)	Mahamane Sacho	Athletics
93	Malta (MLT)	Matthew Sultana	Swimming
94	Mauritania (MTN)	Lehbib Yehdiha	Athletics
95	Mauritius (MRI)	Patricia Mustapha	Athletics
96	Mexico (MEX)	Patricia Valle	Swimming
97	Moldova (MDA)	Larisa Marinenkova	Powerlifting
98	Mongolia (MGL)	Undralbat Lkhagva	Shooting
99	Montenegro (MNE)	Marijana Gorahovic	Athletics
100	Morocco (MAR)	Laila Elgaraa	Athletics
101	Mozambique (MOZ)	Maria Muchavo	Athletics
102	Myanmar (MYA)	Win Naing	Athletics
103	Namibia (NAM)	Ananias Shikongo	Athletics
104	Nepal (NEP)	Bikram Rama	Athletics
105	Netherlands (NED)	Ronald Hertog	Athletics
106	New Zealand (NZL)	Michael Johnson	Shooting
107	Nicaragua (NCA)	Wapra Holmonn Gabriel de Jesus	Athletics
108	Niger (NIG)	Ibrahim Tamangue	Athletics
109	Nigeria (NGR)	Patricia Ndidimaka Nnaji	Athletics
110	Norway (NOR)	Aleksander Wang-Hansen	Sailing
111	Oman (OMA)	Issam Khuda Al-Balushi	Powerlifting
112	Pakistan (PAK)	Haider Ali	Athletics
113	Palestine (PLE)	Khamis Zaqout	Athletics
114	Panama (PAN)	Said Gomez	Athletics
115	Papua New Guinea (PNG)	Francis Kompaon	Athletics
116	Peru (PER)	Pompilio Falconi	Athletics
117	Philippines (PHI)	Josephine Medina	Table tennis
118	Poland (POL)	Renata Chilewska	Athletics
119	Portugal (POR)	Inês Fernandes	Athletics
120	Puerto Rico (PUR)	Julio Reguero	Sailing
121	Qatar (QAT)	Abdulqadir Abdulrahman	Athletics
122	Romania (ROU)	Edvard Novak	Cycling
123	Russia (RUS)	Alexey Ashapatov	Athletics
124	Rwanda (RWA)	Hermas Muvunyi	Athletics
125	Samoa (SAM)	Milo Toleafoa	Athletics
126	San Marino (SMR)	Cristian Bernardi	Athletics
127	Saudi Arabia (KSA)	Masaud Osamah Al Shanqiti	Athletics
128	Senegal (SEN)	Ndiaye Mor	Athletics
129	Serbia (SRB)	Draženko Mitrović	Athletics
130	Sierra Leone (SLE)	Mohamed Kamara	Athletics
131	Singapore (SIN)	Ruisi Theresa Goh	Swimming
132	Slovakia (SVK)	Vladislav Janovjak	Cycling
133	Slovenia (SLO)	Mateja Pintar	Table tennis
134	Solomon Islands (SOL)	Hellen Glenda Saohaga	Athletics
135	South Africa (RSA)	Oscar Pistorius	Athletics
136	Spain (ESP)	Teresa Perales	Swimming
137	Sri Lanka (SRI)	Lal Pushpakumara Pattiwila Arachchilage	Athletics
138	Suriname (SUR)	Biondi Misasi	Athletics
139	Sweden (SWE)	Jonas Jacobsson	Shooting
140	Switzerland (SUI)	Beat Boesch	Athletics
141	Syria (SYR)	Rasha Alshikh	Powerlifting
142	Chinese Taipei (TPE)	Lin Wen-Hsin	Table tennis
143	Tajikistan (TJK)	Parviz Odinaev	Powerlifting
144	Tanzania (TAN)	Zaharani Mwenemti	Athletics
145	Thailand (THA)	Saysunee Jana	Wheelchair fencing
146	Timor-Leste (TLS)	Filomeno Soares	Athletics
147	Tonga (TGA)	Aloalo Liku	Athletics
148	Trinidad and Tobago (TRI)	Ronald Greene	Athletics
149	Tunisia (TUN)	Abderrahim Zhiou	Athletics
150	Turkey (TUR)	Gizem Girismen	Archery
151	Turkmenistan (TKM)	Sohbet Charyyev	Athletics
152	Uganda (UGA)	Christine Akullo	Athletics
153	Ukraine (UKR)	Margaryta Pryvalykhina	Sitting volleyball
154	United Arab Emirates (UAE)	Mohammed Khalaf	Powerlifting
155	United States (USA)	Scott Danberg	Athletics
156	Uruguay (URU)	Gonzalo Gabriel Jutra Irinitz	Swimming
157	Virgin Islands (ISV)	Lee Frawley	Equestrian
158	Uzbekistan (UZB)	Husniddin Norbekov	Athletics
159	Vanuatu (VAN)	Marcel Houssimoli	Athletics
160	Venezuela (VEN)	Naomi Suazo	Judo
161	Vietnam (VIE)	Ngoc Hung Cao	Athletics
162	Zambia (ZAM)	Lassam Katongo	Athletics
163	Zimbabwe (ZIM)	Elliot Mujaji	Athletics
164	Great Britain (GBR)	Peter Norfolk	Wheelchair tennis

== See also ==
- 2012 Summer Olympics national flag bearers
