= Mongolia at the 2012 Summer Paralympics =

- IPC code: MGL
- NPC: Mongolian Paralympic Committee

in London
- Competitors: 6 in 4 sports
- Medals: Gold 0 Silver 0 Bronze 0 Total 0

Summer Paralympics appearances (overview)
- 2000; 2004; 2008; 2012; 2016; 2020; 2024

Mongolia competed at the 2012 Summer Paralympics in London, United Kingdom from August 29 to September 9, 2012.

== Archery ==
Women

Athlete	Event	Ranking round		Round of 32	Round of 16	Quarterfinals	Semifinals	Finals	
Athlete	Event	Score	Seed	Opposition score	Opposition score	Opposition score	Opposition score	Opposition score	Rank
Oyun-Erdene Buyanjargal	Indi. recurve standing	516	11	Bye	Vennard (GBR) (6); L 2-6	Did not advance			
Javzmaa Byambasuren	Indi. recurve standing	524	8	Bye	Khuthawisap (THA) (9); W 6-4	Gao (CHN) (1); W 6-0	Lee (KOR) (4); L 3-7	Olszewska (POL) (2); L 2-6	4

== Athletics ==
Men’s Field Events

Athlete	Event	Distance	Rank
Munkh-Erdene Chuluundorj	Javelin Throw F57-58	NM	

== Judo ==
Athlete	Event	Round of 16	Quarterfinals	Semifinals	First Repechage Round	Repechage Semifinals	Final	
Athlete	Event	Opposition Result	Opposition Result	Opposition Result	Opposition Result	Opposition Result	Opposition Result	Rank
Munkhbat Aajim	Men’s -60kg	Noura (ALG); L 0001–1001	Did not advance		Quilter (GBR); L 000–010	Did not advance		9
Ganbat Dashtseren	Men’s -90kg	Bye	Marcillis (CUB); L 000–100	Did not advance	Pominov (UKR); W 110–0001	Asakereh (IRI); L 000–100	Did not advance	7

== Shooting ==
Women

Athlete	Event	Qualification		Final	
Athlete	Event	Score	Rank	Score	Rank
Lkhamsuren Tsedendash	10m Air Pistol SH1	327	14	Did not advance	

== See also ==
- Mongolia at the 2012 Summer Olympics
