= Sharon Vennard =

British archer

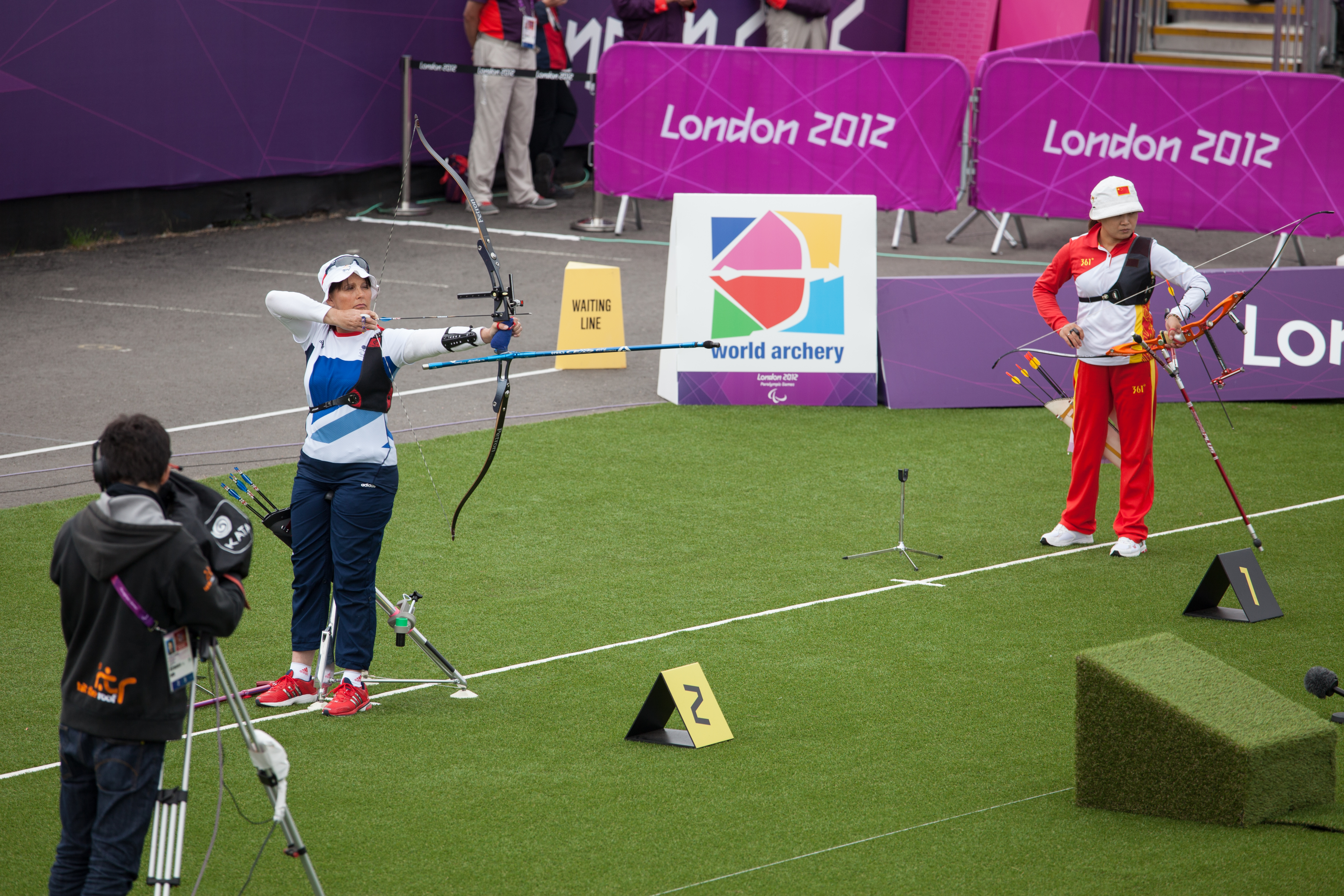
- Sharon Vennard (2) and Yan Huilian (1) at the 2012 Paralympics

Personal information
- Born: 17 September 1961 (age 64) Exmouth, Devon, England

Sport
- Country: Great Britain
- Sport: Archery
- Event: Women's recurve

Sharon Vennard (born 17 September 1961) is a British competitive archer who competed at the 2012 Summer Paralympics.

== Personal life ==
Vennard was born in Exmouth, Devon, England and now lives in Newtownards, County Down, Northern Ireland. She has osteoarthritis in her spine, causing her constant pain, and fibromyalgia which has resulted in her having mobility and balance problems. She has a BTEC qualification in Medical Laboratory Science.

== Career ==
Vennard started her career as a recurve archer in 1997 and began representing Northern Ireland in 1998. However, her osteoarthritis - for which she underwent two spinal operations - severely curtailed her success, so she switched to compound archery around 2006. She went on to compete in the British Indoor and Euronations competitions for Northern Ireland between 2007 and 2010.

After being classified as a disabled archer in 2009, she joined the British Paralympic archery squad. She won gold medals in the team recurve events at the 2011 Stoke Mandeville Open and at the 2011 Para-Archery World Ranking Event, held in Nymburk, Czech Republic. At the 2011 World Championships, held in Turin, Italy, she was part of the British trio that finished 5th in the team recurve.

She was selected as part of a squad of thirteen British archers to compete in her first Paralympics at the 2012 Summer Games held in London, United Kingdom. In the women's individual recurve she qualified sixth after the opening ranking round, earning her a bye into the round of 16. In her first match she faced Javzmaa Byambasuren of Mongolia and won six sets to two. In the quarterfinal she competed against Yan Huilian the third seed from China and was beaten in straight sets, six to zero. In the women's team recurve Vennard competed alongside Kate Murray and Leigh Walmsley. They placed sixth in the ranking round with a combined score of 1549. The trio faced the South Korean team in the quarterfinals but were defeated 188-153 and eliminated from the competition.

Vennard trains at the City of Belfast Archery Club and is coached by Alistair Whittingham.
