= Martin Imboden =

Swiss Paralympic archer (born 1963)

Personal information
- Nationality: Swiss
- Born: 12 December 1963 (age 61); Hohtenn, Switzerland

Sport
- Country: Switzerland
- Sport: Archery
- Event: Compound
- Coached by: Laurent Astier

Martin Imboden (born 12 December 1963) is a Swiss Paralympic archer.

He has competed once at the Summer Paralympics, four times at the World Para Archery Championships and twice at the Para Continental Championships.

105 Swiss athletes were sent to Rio Olympic Games and 21 of those were paralympians. Imboden and Magali Comte were the only paralympian archers.
