= ARW2 =

Para-archery classification

ARW2 Classification
- Sport: Paralympic Archery
- Administrator: International Archery Federation

ARW2 is a Paralympic archery classification.

It is a sitting class. This class includes Les Autres sportspeople. People from this class compete in the sport at the Paralympic Games, with an early version appearing at the 1988 World Championships.

== History ==
A version of this classification first appeared in 1998 during the World Championships, when the sport's governing body decided to pilot a classification programme. At the time, there was a classification called W1, which was for all sitting archers.

== Sport ==
This is a Paralympic archery classification. In 2000, BBC Sport defined this classification as "W2, wheelchair users with full arm function. " In 2008, BBC Sport defined this classification was "ARW2: wheelchair users with full arm function" In 2008, the Australian Broadcasting Corporation defined this classification was "The main difference between ARW1 and ARW2 is the amount of functional ability athletes have in their upper bodies.". In 2012, the Australian Paralympic Education Programme defined this classification as "ARW2 - wheelchair users with full arm movement" In 2010, World Archery defined this classification as: "Defined as paraplegic archer in a wheelchair or comparable disability." The Telegraph in 2011 described this classification as: "Athletes shooting from wheelchairs, but whose disability have less impact than W1 " The British Council defines this classification in 2012 as: "These athletes have a disability that affects only their legs."

== Disability groups ==
=== Les Autres ===
One of the disability groups eligible to participate in this class is people defined as Les Autres.

==== LAF2 ====
LAF2 classified athletes compete in ARW1 or ARW2. Sportspeople in this class use wheelchairs on a regular basis as a result of reduced muscle function. They have low to moderate levels of balance issues while sitting, but maintain overall good balance from that position. They have normal arm function. Medically, this class includes people with severe hemiplegia, and paralysis of one limb while having deformations in two other limbs. Functionally, this means they have severe impairment of three limbs, or all four limbs but to a lesser degree than LAF1. In terms of functional classification, this means the sportsperson uses a wheelchair, has moderate sitting balance, reduced limb function in their throwing limb but has good sitting balance while throwing.

==== LAF3 ====
LAF3 classified athletes compete in ARW2. Sportspeople in this class use wheelchairs on a regular basis as a result of reduced muscle function. They have normal trunk functionality, balance and use of their upper limbs. Medically, this class includes people with hemiparsis, and hip and knee stiffness with deformation in one arm. It means they have limited function in at least two limbs. In terms of functional classification, this means the sportsperson uses a wheelchair, has good sitting balance and has good arm function.

== Events ==
At the 2008 Summer Paralympics, this classification was known as W2. Events eligible for this classification included W2 Men, W1/2 Women, and team. For the W2 Men, archers qualified from China, Chinese Taipei, France, Germany, Great Britain, Israel, Italy, Japan, Korea, Malaysia, the Netherlands, Poland, Slovakia, Spain, Thailand, Turkey, the Ukreain and the United States. For the W1/2 Women's competition, archers qualified from Canada, China, the Czech Republic, France, Germany, Great Britain, Italy, Japan, Turkey and Ukraine.

The World Archery Para Championships are the major international event for this classification. In 2011, it was held in Turin, Italy and served as a qualification competition for the 2012 Summer Paralympics. Events for this classification included Individual Recurve Men W2 and Individual Recurve Women W2, in addition to team events using either a compound bow or a recurve bow.

At the 2011 BWAA & WheelPower National Championships & 7th Invitational Event held at the Stoke Mandeville Stadium in England, the gold medal in the Recurve Bow Class W2 Men event was won by Mustafa Demit of Turkey, the silver by Taras Chopyk of Ukraine and the bronze by Piotr Sawicki of Poland. In the Recurve Bow Class W2 Women event, gold was won by Gizem Girismen of Turkey, silver by Hatice Bayer of Turkey and bronze by Ozlem Kalay of Turkey.

For the 2012 Summer Paralympics, the men's individual recurve qualifying score for the event set by FITA and the International Paralympic Committee was 1100+ FITA score and 720 Round Score of 550+. For the 2012 Summer Paralympics, the women's individual recurve qualifying score for the event set by FITA and the International Paralympic Committee was 1000+ FITA score and 720 Round Score of 450+. At the 2012 Paralympics, this classification competed in the "Olympic round format at a 122cm target from a distance of 70m".

For the 2016 Summer Paralympics in Rio, the International Paralympic Committee had a zero classification at the Games policy. This policy was put into place in 2014, with the goal of avoiding last minute changes in classes that would negatively impact athlete training preparations. All competitors needed to be internationally classified with their classification status confirmed prior to the Games, with exceptions to this policy being dealt with on a case-by-case basis. In case there was a need for classification or reclassification at the Games despite best efforts otherwise, archery classification was scheduled for September 7 and September 8 at Sambodromo.

== Equipment ==
For archers in this class, "no part of the chair back or its vertical support may protrude in front of the half of the trunk." Their wheelchair can be higher than 110 millimetres (4.3 in) from the bottom of the armpit of an archer.

== Competitors ==
Competitors from this classification include Canada's Lyne Tremblay.

== Becoming classified ==
Classification is handled by FITA – International Archery Federation. FITA has an Ad Hoc Committee dedication to classification, which is led by Chief Classifier Pauline Betteridge. This committee is in charge of determining classifications, providing materials about classifications and training people to classify archers. World Archery classification is done by at least three people. One of them must have a medical background. On the national level, there only needs to be one classifier. Archery classification is done by medical professionals. In classifying an archer, the classifiers look for the range of movement and strength of the archer's arms, legs and back.
