= Kamran Shokrisalari =

Iranian Paralympic athlete

Personal information
- Born: 21 September 1991 (age 34) Andimeshk, Iran
- Height: 167 cm (66 in)

Sport
- Country: Iran
- Sport: Athletics
- Disability class: F42
- Event: javelin throw
- Club: Takhti: Khorramabad
- Coached by: Mostafa Bahram
Medal record
Track and field
Representing Iran
Paralympic Games
Silver medal – second place	2012 London	Javelin F42
Asian Para Games
Gold medal – first place	2010 Guangzhou	Javelin F42

Kamran Shokrisalari (born 21 September 1991) is a Paralympian athlete from Iran competing mainly in F42 classification throwing events.

== Athletics history ==
Shokrisalari represented Iran at the 2012 Summer Paralympics in London, where he entered the F42 javelin throw event. In the javelin, Shokrisalari second round throw of 52.06 metres was a personal best, and this placed him in first place for much of the competition; only for him to see lead snatched by a new world record by China's Fu Yanlong in his final throw. Shokrisalari took silver, his first Paralympic medal.

== Personal history ==
Shokrisalari was born in Andimeshk, Iran.
