= Lindsey Carmichael =

American Paralympic archer (born 1985)

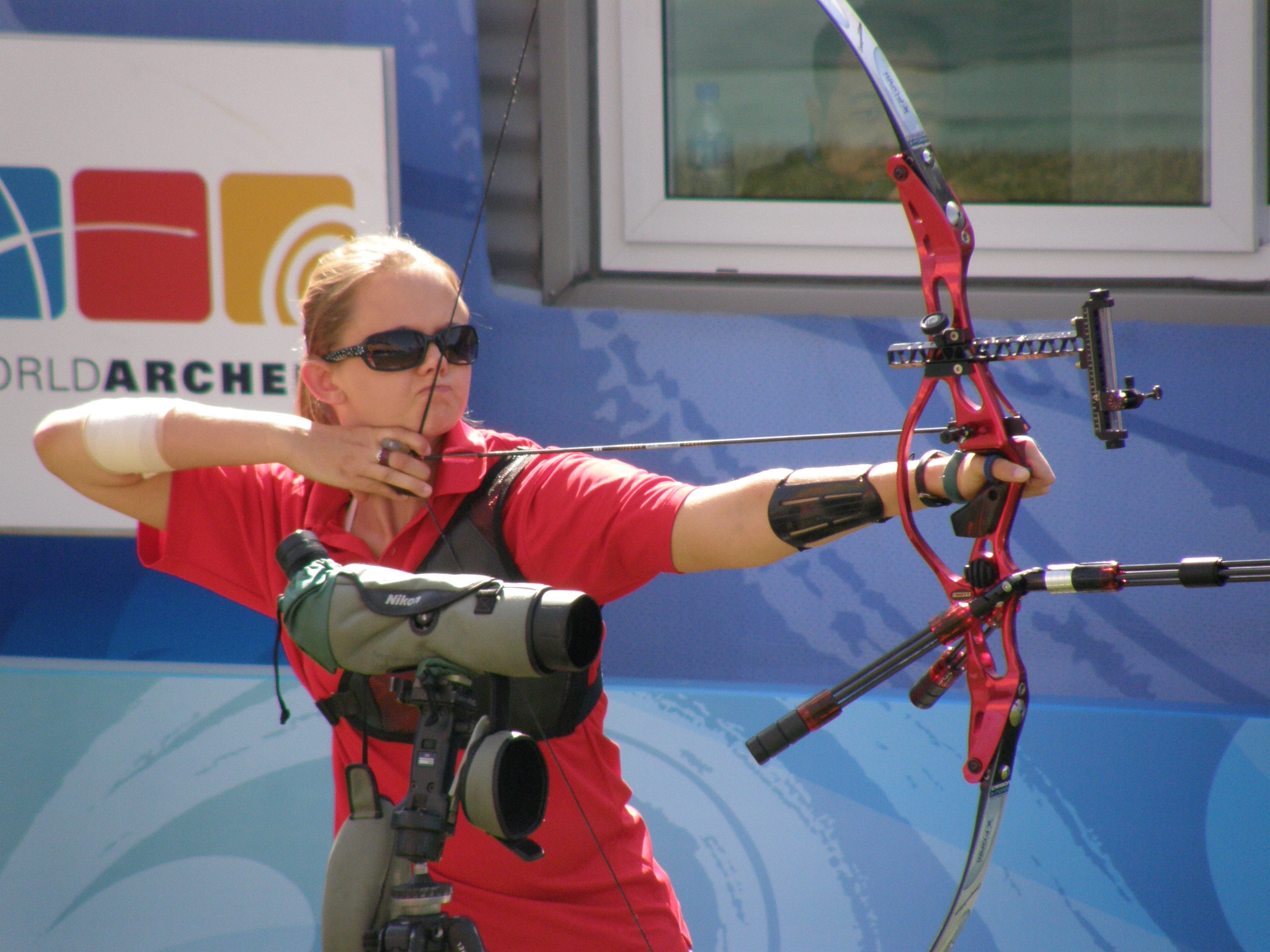
- Carmichael during bronze medal match, 2008

Personal information
- Full name: Lindsey Ann Carmichael
- Born: July 22, 1985 (age 41) San Antonio, Texas, U.S.
Medal record
Women's archery
Representing United States
Paralympic Games
Bronze medal – third place	2008 Beijing	Ind. recurve standing

Lindsey Ann Carmichael (born July 22, 1985, in San Antonio, Texas) is a Paralympic Bronze Medalist in archery.

== Early years ==
She spent her first years in Uvalde, Texas, and then moved to Austin and then Lago Vista, Texas, where she attended middle and high school. Diagnosed at the age of 4 with McCune–Albright syndrome, she experienced a number of bone fractures (leg, hip, and arm) and surgeries to remedy the impact of the disease. This required her to use body casts, crutches and a wheelchair at various times. Her femurs and tibias were eventually rodded with steel and titanium rods.

== Archery career ==
At the age of 13 while in middle school, a math teacher overheard her discussing with a friend the lack of PE (physical education) options for students in wheelchairs such as herself. He suggested she try archery. Lindsey became an archer at Archery Country JOAD, participating on a weekly basis. JOAD is the National Archery Association's acronym for "Junior Olympic Archery Development". In the ensuing years she set a number of records in her age group, competing as both a nondisabled category as well as an archer with disabilities, setting numerous at the Texas State level, US national records and even world records. She underwent a 16-hour surgical procedure to shift 2.5 cm of bone from one femur to the other in Dec. 2002 at the Rochester Mayo Clinic, suffering a hip fracture in the process and had to learn to walk again. She competed in a US national tournament just a few months later, finishing 47 of 71 archers. Lindsey represented the United States in international tournaments starting in 2003 at the International Paralympic Championships in Madrid, Spain where she won a slot for the United States at the 2004 Paralympics.

== Athens Paralympics ==
While at the Athens Paralympics in 2004 she set a world record of 603 (out of a possible 720) shooting at 70 meters at a 122 cm target during the qualifying round. Lindsey ultimately finished 6th in Athens as a standing female recurve archer.

On April 1, 2005, she was ranked 8th among all adult nondisabled women recurve archers in the United States, finishing 2nd at the Texas Shootout archery tournament as a (nondisabled) female senior recurve. She continued to compete, while attending the University of Texas with a double major in English and history, representing the United States by attending competitions in Korea, Slovakia, and England.

She achieved both All-American and Academic All-American status as an archer in both 2006 and 2007 for UT. In 2006 Lindsey finished in the National Archery Championship US Open in 5th place as a nondisabled archer.

== Beijing Paralympics ==
In 2008 Lindsey finished competition for the USA at the Summer Paralympics in Beijing with a bronze medal by shooting a score of 105 (out of a possible 120), the highest women's recurve score of the day. This marks the first time for a U.S. female archer to have won an individual medal in archery since Susan Hagel's bronze medal in the 1996 Paralympic Games in Atlanta.

During her time in Beijing, she kept a blog called Rings and Arrows, which received some attention after exposure on Metaquotes.

== Collegiate experience ==
She returned to the University of Texas, where she was selected to be a member of the oldest honor society on campus, the Friar Society, and to complete her studies and continue to shoot. At UT she received Academic All-American three times, represented her school and her country at the 2006 World Collegiate Archery Championships in Slovakia, and coached beginner and intermediate lessons at the UT Archery Club. While studying full-time for her double-degrees in English and History, Lindsey successfully completed several 50,000 word novels in the National Novel Writing Month project while at UT. She also worked continually as an administrative assistant at the Trinity United Methodist Church in Austin. In 2009 as an outstanding student she was honored with the Mike Wacker award by the Texas Parents Association She won numerous writing awards in the English Department during her time at UT, including a unique memorial scholarship that is best summarized in an article published by the UT Exes Association's bimonthly publication, The Alcalde. Just prior to her graduation in May 2011 she was honored as one of only twelve Liberal Arts students from the entire graduating class recognized with the "Dean's Distinguished Graduate Award". She is a lifetime member of the University of Texas Exes Association.

== Archery coaching ==
After Lindsey retired from the sport, she offered private archery lessons at a range in central Austin for three years. She was certified by USA Archery to serve the community as a Level III Coach in the National Training System, which was designed by US Olympic Head Coach Kisik Lee. Often in collaboration with other local coaches, she held seminars on NTS technique, as well as certifying others to become Instructors and Coaches within the sport. She retired from coaching and transitioned her archery students to other coaches in 2014 after accepting a full time position with a nonprofit.

== Writing ==
Lindsey's short fiction and poetry appeared in 2011 in Analecta and Hothouse.
