= Zehra Özbey Torun =

Turkish para-archer and former wheelchair basketball player

Personal information
- Born: 7 September 1982 (age 43)
- Home town: Antalya, Turkey

Sport
- Sport: Paralympic archery
- Event: Recurve bow
- Club: Vedat Erbay SK
- Coached by: Vedat Erbay

Zehra Özbey Torun (born 7 September 1982) is a Turkish female para-archer competing in the women's recurve bow standing event. A former wheelchair basketball player, she competed at the 2016 Summer Paralympics.

== Results ==
Paralympic Games

7 Individual Recurve - Open 2016 Rio de Janeiro, BRA

World Championships

2 Team Recurve - Open 2019 's-Hertogenbosch, NED

9 Individual Recurve - Open 2019 's-Hertogenbosch, NED

9 Individual Recurve - Open 2017 Beijing, CHN

European Championships

6 Individual Recurve - Open 2018 Plzen, CZE

== Early life ==
Zehra Özbay Torun was born with disability on 7 September 1982.

She lives in Antalya, Turkey, where she moved to after her marriage. She has a baby and works in the state service.

== Sporting career ==
Zehra Özbay Torun began her sports career with Wheelchair DanceSport. She then switched over to wheelchair basketball and played in the national team. She took a break in her active sports life as she learned her pregnancy after the marriage. Nine months after giving birth to a baby, she returned to sports. She switched over to wheelchair archery in order to have more free time for her baby. After a brief training by Vedat Erbay in the Vedat Erbay SK, she was admitted to the Turkey women's national wheelchair archery team.

She competed at the 2016 European Qualifier held in Saint-Jean-de-Monts, France, and obtained a quota spot for 2016 Paralympics in Rio de Janeiro, Brazil.
