= Abdolreza Jokar =

Iranian Paralympic athlete

Personal information
- Born: 21 January 1970 (age 56)

Sport
- Sport: Paralympic athletics
Medal record
Paralympic athletics
Representing Iran
Paralympic Games
Gold medal – first place	1996 Atlanta	Discus throw F52
Gold medal – first place	2000 Sydney	Discus throw F53
Silver medal – second place	2008 Beijing	Javelin throw F53/54
Silver medal – second place	2012 London	Javelin throw F52/53
Bronze medal – third place	1996 Atlanta	Javelin throw F52
Bronze medal – third place	2000 Sydney	Javelin throw F53
Bronze medal – third place	2004 Athens	Javelin throw F52/53
World Championships
Gold medal – first place	2006 Assen	Javelin throw F53
Gold medal – first place	2011 Christchurch	Javelin throw F52/53
Silver medal – second place	2013 Lyon	Javelin throw F52/53
Asian Para Games
Silver medal – second place	2014 Incheon	Shot put F53/54
Silver medal – second place	2018 Jakarta	Javelin throw F53/54

Abdolreza Jokar (born 21 January 1970) is a Paralympian athlete from Iran competing mainly in category F53 javelin events.

Abdolreza has competed at five Paralympic Games. The first in 2000 where he won the F53 discus and the bronze medal in the F53 javelin. In 2004 he won a bronze medal in the F52/53 javelin before winning a silver in the F53/54 javelin in the 2008 Summer Paralympics. In 2012 he won a silver medal in the F52/53 javelin.

== Flag bearer in 2012 Summer Paralympics ==
He was the flag-bearer for Iran in 2012 Summer Paralympics Parade of Nations.
