= Gizem Girişmen =

Turkish Paralympic archer

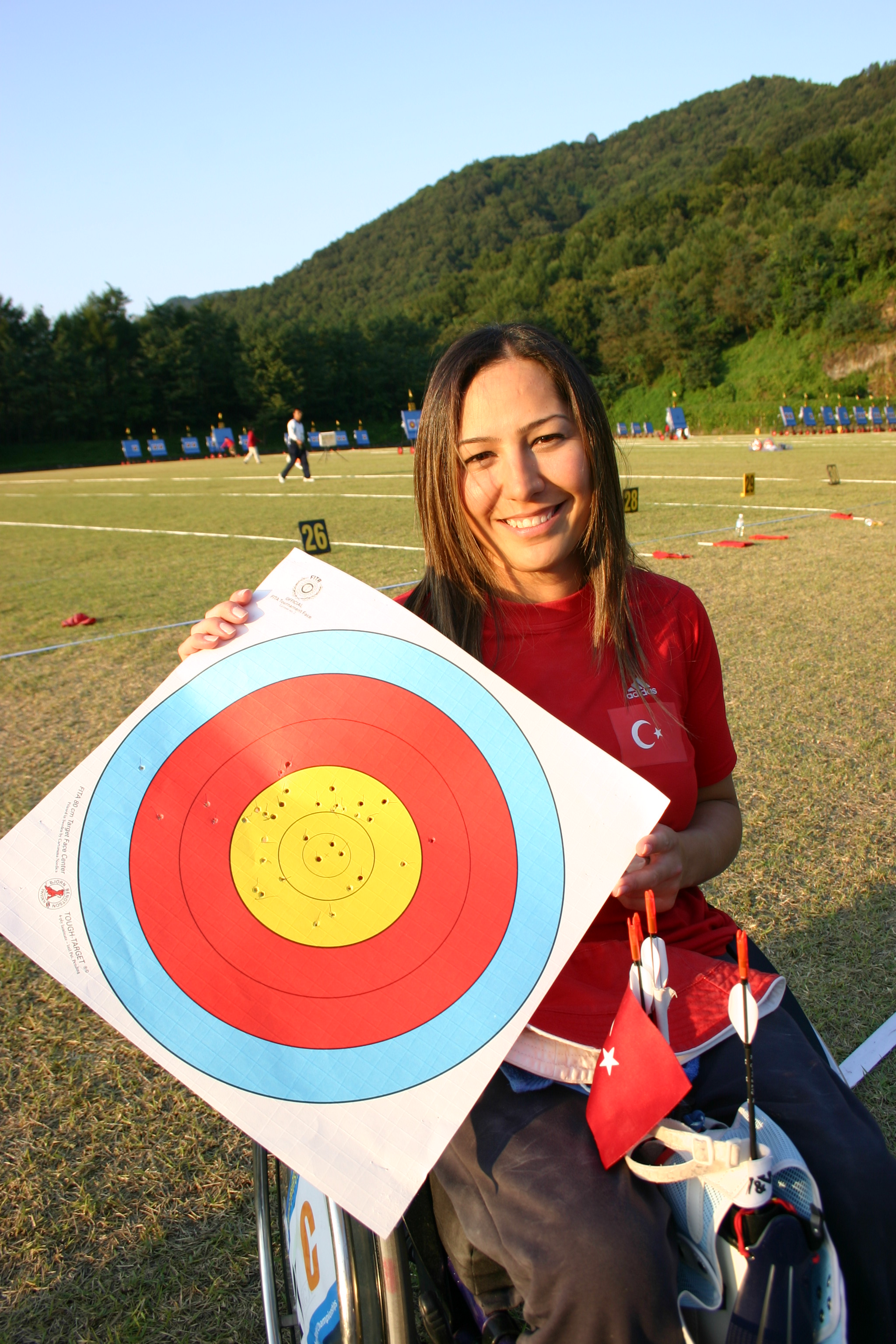
- Girişmen with target

Personal information
- Nationality: Turkish
- Born: 25 November 1981 (age 44) Ankara, Turkey

Sport
- Country: Turkey
- Sport: Paralympic archery
- Event: Women's recurve ARW2
- Club: Ankara Okçuluk İhtisas Spor Kulübü
- Coached by: Gülüşen Güler Balcı

Achievements and titles
- Paralympic finals: 2008
Medal record
Women's archery
Representing Turkey
Paralympic Games
Gold medal – first place	2008 Beijing	Individual recurve W1/W2
- Updated on 8 September 2012

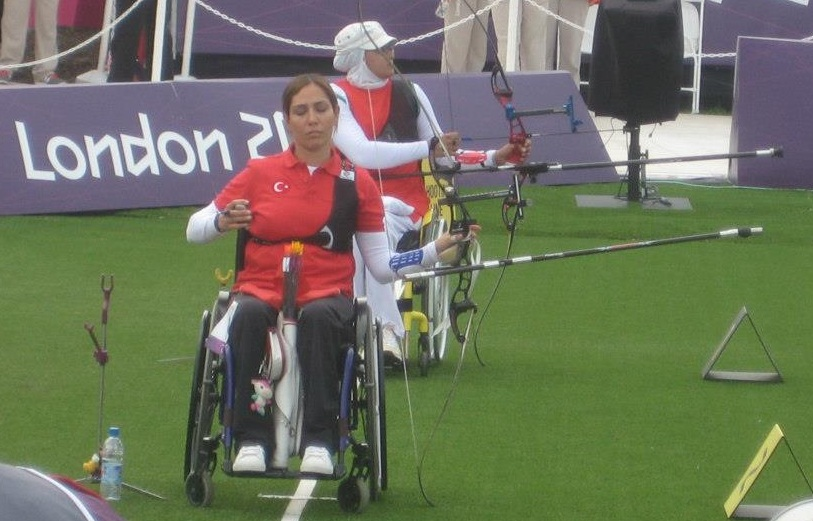
Gizem Girişmen (in front) competing against Iran's Zahra Nemati at the London 2012 Paralympics.

Gizem Girişmen (born 25 November 1981) is a Turkish Paralympic archer competing in the women's recurve ARW2 event.

== Early years ==
In 1992, at the age of eleven, she was paralyzed following a traffic accident. She completed her education with honors in Business Administration from Bilkent University in 2004. In the same year, she was invited to an archery competition where she got interested and decided to practice that sport. She practised in the basement garage of her apartment building, with the permission of the neighbors.

After two years of practice and competition experience in national tournaments, Gizem Girişmen had 3rd place (ARW2 Recurve Female) at 2006 EPC Archery European Championships held in the Czech Republic, which was her first international tournament.

== Sporting career ==
She won the first place (FITA Round) at the 2007 IPC Archery World Championships in Cheongju, South Korea. In the same year, she won first place in the 2007 Czech Republic International Archery Tournament. In 2008, she became second in the European Disabled Archery Grand Prix held between 12–18 July in the United Kingdom.

She represented Turkey at the 2008 Summer Paralympics in the category of individual recurve W1/W2 and won the gold medal by defeating her Chinese rival Fu Hongzhi.

Finally in August 2009, Girişmen confirmed her World Champion status by winning the gold at the Para-Archery World Championships held in Nymburk, Czech Republic.

She has been ranked Number One Archer in the World for Women's Ind. Recurve-W1/W2 since 2007.

Girişmen was nominated as the Laureus World Sportsperson of the Year, the first Turkish athlete nominated to this award.

Gizem Girişmen is also the Turkish record holder of 30-50-60-70 meters, FITA, 70 mt round and Olymp R Match for ARW2 female category.

She competed at the 2012 Summer Paralympics in the women's individual recurve W1/W2 event, where she lost to her Iranian opponent in the quarterfinals. She was also part of the Turkish team at the women's team recurve event, which came 5th losing to the team from Italy in the quarterfinals.

== See also ==
- Turkish women in sports

== Honors ==
- Torch bearer of 2008 Summer Paralympics
- Athlete of the Month (August 2009) by IPC
- Flag bearer of Turkey at the 2012 Summer Paralympics

Paralympics
Preceded by Muharrem Korhan Yamaç	Flagbearer for Turkey; London 2012	Succeeded by Mesme Taşbağ
