= Zahra Nemati =

Iranian Paralympic and Olympic archer (born 1985)

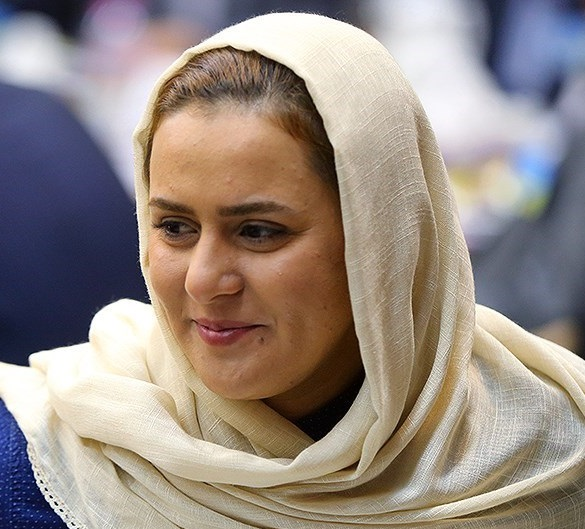
- Zahra Nemati in 43rd N.O.I.C General Assembly

Personal information
- Born: 30 April 1985 (age 41) Kerman, Kerman Province, Iran
- Spouse: Roham Shahabi-pour (m. 2012)

Sport
- Country: Iran
- Sport: Archery
Medal record
Representing Iran
Paralympic Games
| Gold medal – first place | 2012 London | Individual recurve W1/W2 |
| Gold medal – first place | 2016 Rio de Janeiro | Individual recurve open |
| Gold medal – first place | 2020 Tokyo | Individual recurve open |
| Silver medal – second place | 2016 Rio de Janeiro | Team recurve open |
| Bronze medal – third place | 2012 London | Team recurve |
Asian Para Games
| Gold medal – first place | 2014 Incheon | Individual recurve |
| Gold medal – first place | 2018 Jakarta | Individual recurve |
| Gold medal – first place | 2018 Jakarta | Team recurve open W2/ST |
| Gold medal – first place | 2022 Hangzhou | Individual recurve |
| Gold medal – first place | 2022 Hangzhou | Team recurve |
| Silver medal – second place | 2022 Hangzhou | Doubles recurve |
| Bronze medal – third place | 2010 Guangzhou | Individual recurve W1/W2 |
World Para-archery Championships
| Gold medal – first place | 2013 Bangkok | Women's recurve W2 |
| Bronze medal – third place | 2013 Bangkok | Team recurve |

Zahra Nemati (Persian: زهرا نعمتی, born 30 April 1985) is an Iranian Paralympic and Olympic archer. She originally competed in taekwondo before she was paralyzed in a car accident. At the 2012 Summer Paralympics she won two medals, an individual gold and a team bronze. She qualified to compete at both the 2016 Summer Olympics and the 2016 Summer Paralympics. She was the flagbearer for Iran at the 2016 Olympics and the postponed 2020 Summer Paralympics in Tokyo where she shared the honour with thrower Nourmohammad Arekhi.

== Personal life ==
Nemati was born in Kerman, Iran. In 2003, she was injured in a car accident, leaving her with spinal injuries and paralysis of both legs.

== Sports career ==
Prior to her injuries, Nemati had been a black belt in taekwondo. She took up archery in 2006 and within six months finished third in the National Championships, competing against able-bodied athletes. In para-archery events she competes in the W2 classification.

Nemati was selected to compete for Iran at the 2012 Summer Paralympics, held in London, United Kingdom, where she won two medals, becoming the first Iranian woman to win a gold medal at either the Olympic or Paralympic Games. In the women's recurve W1/W2 event she placed first in the ranking round with a score of 613 and received a bye to the round of 16 where she beat Mariangela Perna of Italy 6–0. In the quarterfinals she defeated Turkey's Gizem Girismen again by a score of 6–0 and advanced to the gold medal match by winning her semifinal against Italy's Veronica Floreno 6–0. Nemati faced Elisabetta Mijno of Italy in the final and secured the gold medal with a 7–3 win. She dedicated her gold medal to "all of the people who prayed for me to achieve this success."

In the women's team recurve, Nemati was part of the Iranian team alongside Razieh Shir Mohammadi and Zahra Javanmard. They placed second in the ranking round with 1646 points and defeated the Czech Republic in the quarterfinals. In the semifinals the Iranian team lost to South Korea by a score of 192–186 but went on to defeat Italy 188–184 in the bronze medal match as Nemati claimed her second medal of the Games.

At the 2013 World Para-archery Championships held in Bangkok, Thailand, she won the gold medal in the women's individual recurve W2 and a bronze medal in the women's team recurve.

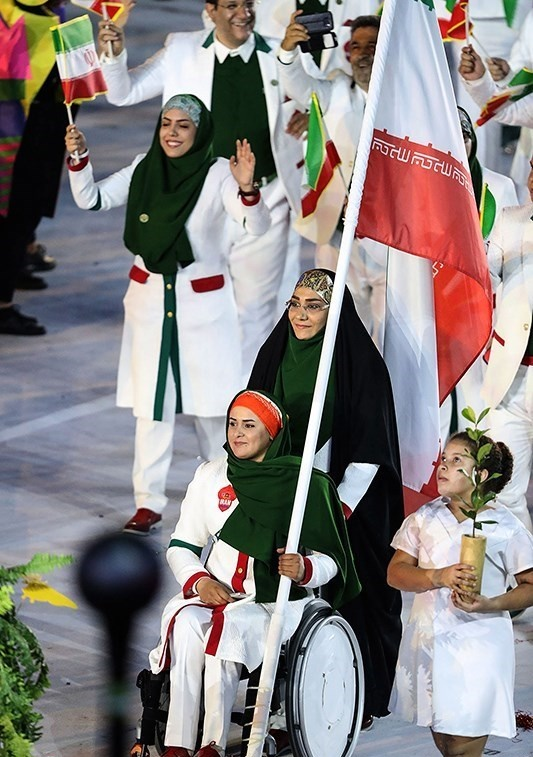
Nemati at the 2016 Summer Olympics' Parade of Nations

In 2015 Nemati made history by securing qualification for both the 2016 Summer Olympics and the 2016 Summer Paralympics to be held in Rio de Janeiro, Brazil. She qualified for the Olympics by placing second in the women's recurve at the 2015 Asian Archery Championships in Bangkok before winning gold at the 2015 Asian Para-archery Championships to qualify for the Paralympics. She is the first archer to qualify for both Games in the same year since Italian Paola Fantato in 1996.

In January 2016 she was selected to be the flag bearer for the Iranian team during the Parade of Nations at the 2016 Summer Olympics opening ceremony.

She competed in the women's individual event at the 2016 Summer Olympics. She placed 49th in the ranking round with a score of 609. She was defeated by Inna Stepanova of Russia in the round of 32. She finished in 33rd place.

== Results ==
=== Paralympic Games ===
1 Individual Recurve - Open 2016 Rio de Janeiro, BRA

1 Individual Recurve - W1/W2 2012 London, GBR

2 Team Recurve - Open 2016 Rio de Janeiro, BRA

3 Team Recurve - Open 2012 London, GBR

=== World Championships ===
1 Individual Recurve - Open 2017 Beijing, CHN

1 Individual Recurve - W2 2013 Bangkok, THA

1 Team Recurve - Open 2011 Turin, ITA

2 Individual Recurve - W1/W2 2011 Turin, ITA

3 Team Recurve - Open 2017 Beijing, CHN

3 Team Recurve - Open 2013 Bangkok, THA

3 Team Recurve - Open 2011 Turin, ITA

4 Individual Recurve - Open 2019 's-Hertogenbosch, NED

4 Team Recurve - Open 2017 Beijing, CHN

7 Team Recurve - Open 2013 Bangkok, THA

9 Team Recurve - Open 2019 's-Hertogenbosch, NED

=== Asian Para Games ===
1 Team Recurve - Open 2018 Jakarta, INA

2 Individual Recurve - Open 2018 Jakarta, INA

== Honors ==
Nemati won the 2013 Sport Accord's Spirit of Sport Individual Award.

== See also ==
- List of athletes who have competed in the Paralympics and Olympics

Olympic Games
| Preceded by Ali Mazaheri | Flagbearer for Iran; Rio de Janeiro 2016 | Succeeded by Samad Nikkhah Bahrami; Hanieh Rostamian |
