= Richard Hennahane =

British Paralympic archer

Personal information
- Nationality: British
- Born: 2 January 1981 (age 45) Chatham, Kent, England

Sport
- Sport: Archery
- Event: Compound
- Club: Bowmen of Bruntwood
Medal record
Representing Great Britain

Richard Hennahane (born 2 January 1981) is a British Paralympic archer from Great Sutton, Cheshire, originally from Kent.

He competed in the 2012 Summer Paralympics in London, being knocked out of the men's compound in the last 16.
