= Jere Forsberg =

Finnish Paralympic archer (born 1994)

Personal information
- Born: 3 March 1994 (age 31)

Sport
- Country: Finland

Jere Forsberg (born 3 March 1994) is a Finnish Paralympic archer.

== Career ==
He represented Finland at the 2012 Summer Paralympics held in London, United Kingdom and he won the gold medal in the men's individual compound open event. He also represented Finland at the 2016 Summer Paralympics held in Rio de Janeiro, Brazil and he did not win a medal this time.

At the 2013 World Para-archery Championships held in Bangkok, Thailand, he won the silver medal in the men's individual compound event.
