= Zinyat Valiyeva =

Azerbaijani Paralympic archer

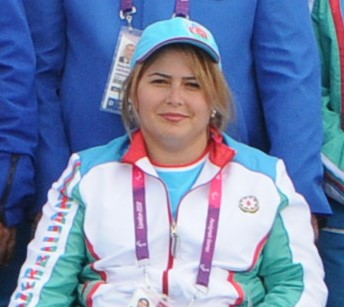

Personal information
- Born: 6 May 1974 (age 52) Keçili, Shamkir Rayon, Azerbaijan

Sport
- Country: Azerbaijan

Achievements and titles
- Highest world ranking: 17
- Updated on 18 September 2011

Zinyat Valiyeva (born 6 May 1974, Keçili, Shamkir Rayon) is an Azerbaijani paralympic archer in ARW2 (Wheelchair W2) classification. On 2011 Para-Archery World Ranking Event in Nymburk she won a bronze medal. Valiyeva presented Azerbaijan at 2012 Summer Paralympics.

In January 2008 she was on 24 place in World Ranking List, in September 2011 she was on 17 place.

== Achievements ==
Year	Tournament	Place and Date	Ranking	Score
2006	4th European Championships	Nymburk, Czech Republic; 11–20 August	11th	796 (54 on 8th of Final)
2007	6th World Championships	Cheongju, South Korea; 1–10 October	21st	970 (75 on 16th of Final)
2009	7th World Championships	Nymburk, Czech Republic; 14–22 August	18th	992 (82 on 16th of Final)
2010	World Ranking Tournament	Nové Město na Moravě, Czech Republic; 26–30 May	5th	490 (5 on 4th of Final)
2010	5th European Championships	Vichy, France; 8–14 August	11th	476 (2 on 8th of Final)
2011	Paralympic Qualification Tournament	Turin, Italy; 17 July	5th	1138 ( 5 (99) on 4th of Final)
2011	World Ranking Tournament	Nymburk, Czech Republic; 12–18 August	3rd	174 (combined team)
2011	Stoke Mandeville Open; World Ranking Tournament	Stoke Mandeville, United Kingdom; 5–9 September	7th	417 (2 on 8th of Final)
