= Magali Comte =

Swiss archer (born 1967)

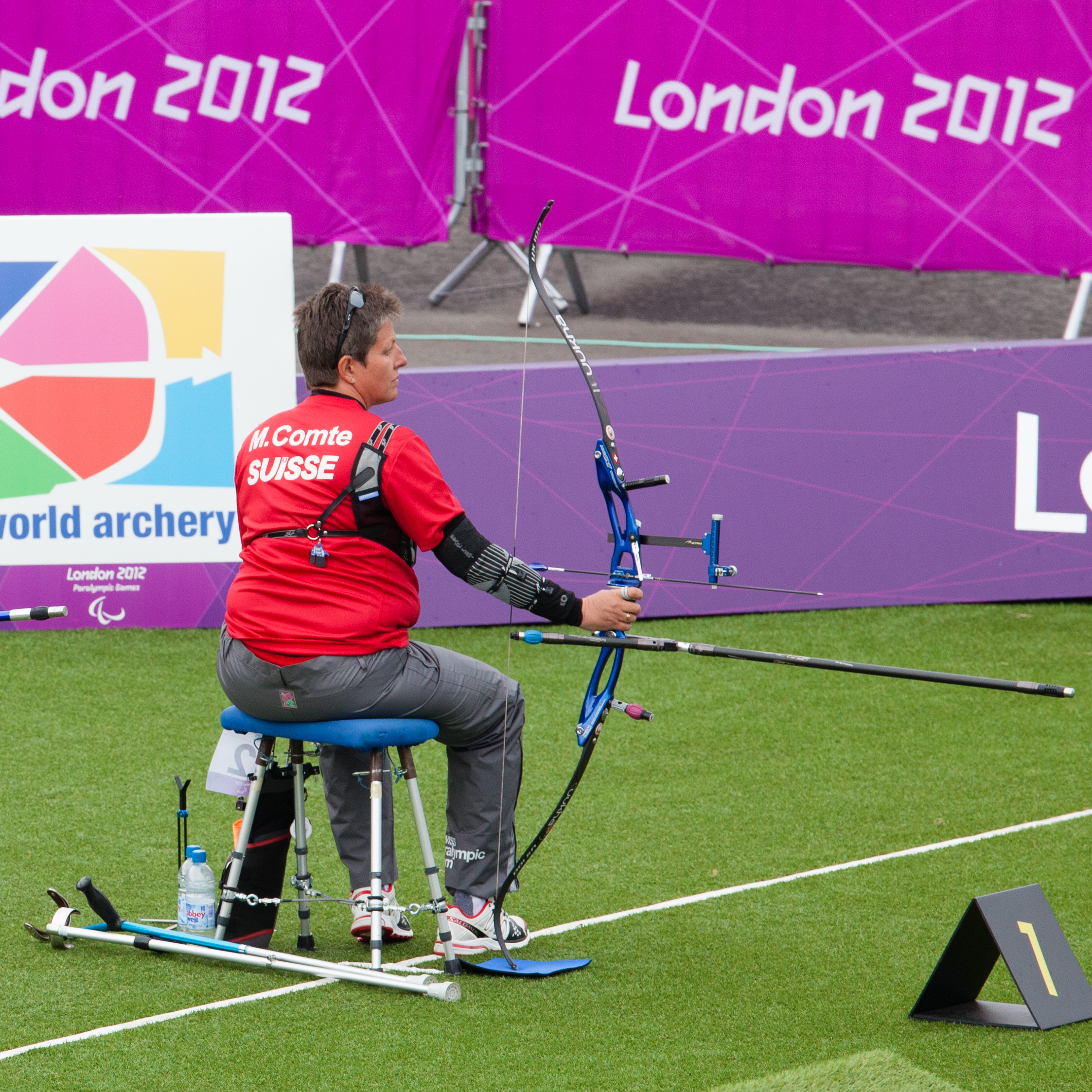
- Born: 23 September 1967 (age 58); Switzerland

Magali Comte (born 23 September 1967) is a Swiss Paralympic archer. She was represented Switzerland at three Olympic Games and she won a bronze medal at the 2011 World Para Archery Championship in Turin.

== Life ==
Comte was born in Switzerland in 1967 and she became a draughtswoman. As the result of a motorcycle accident she had her left leg amputated. Comte lives in Petit-Lancy, Geneva and she became a Paralympic archer.

In 2008, she went to Beijing to compete in the Archery at that year's Summer Paralympics taking part in the Women's individual recurve and finishing 16th. In 2011 she competed in Turin and gained a bronze medal at the 2011 World Para Archery Championship. The following year she competed in the Archery at the 2012 Summer Paralympics in the Women's individual recurve where she finished fifth. She had been assisted by an initiative called "Team Geneva 2012" that raised 190,000 francs that was shared out between the Swiss athletes. Comte was awarded 15,000 francs to assist her.

In 2016, she was surprised and delighted when she again joined the Swiss team at the Paralympics in Rio 2016. 105 athletes were sent to Rio and 21 of those were paralympians. Comte and Martin Imboden were the only paralympian archers. Comte is known as "Gumy". She is left handed and draws a 27 inches (69 cm) arrow at 36 pounds (16 kg).
