= Fu Hongzhi =

Chinese Paralympic archer

Medal record

Archery

Representing China

Paralympic Games
Silver medal – second place	2008 Beijing	Women's individual recurve - W1/W2

Fu Hongzhi is a Chinese paralympic archer. She won the silver medal at the Women's individual recurve - W1/W2 event at the 2008 Summer Paralympics in Beijing.
