= Kim Ran-sook =

South Korean Paralympic archer

Kim Ran Sook
Personal information
- Born: June 30, 1967 (age 58)
Medal record
Archery
Representing South Korea
Paralympic Games
Gold medal – first place	2012 London	Team Recurve - Open
Silver medal – second place	2008 Beijing	Women's team recurve

Kim Ran Sook (Korean: 김란숙) is a South Korean paralympic archer. She won the silver medal at the Women's team recurve event at the 2008 Summer Paralympics in Beijing.
