= Iryna Volynets =

Ukrainian Paraympic archer

Iryna Vladyslavivna Volynets
Personal information
- Full name: Iryna Vladyslavivna Volynets
- Nationality: Ukrainian
- Born: 1 December 1980 (age 45) Chernivtsi region, Ukraine

Sport
- Sport: Archery
- Club: Invasport, Ivano-Frankivsk
- Coached by: Oleh Ilyashenko

Iryna Vladyslavivna Volynets (1 December 1980) is a Ukrainian Paralympic archer. Master of Sports of Ukraine of international class.

Volynets participated in the 2008 Summer Paralympics, 2012 Summer Paralympics, 2016 Summer Paralympics, the 2015 World Cup and the European Championship 2016.

Volynets is engaged in archery at the Ivano-Frankivsk Regional Center for Physical Culture and Sports for the Disabled "Invasport". Volynets’ coach is Oleh Ilyashenko.

In 2013 she represented Ivano-Frankivsk Regional Center "Invasport" in the Winter Championship of Ukraine in archery among athletes with musculoskeletal disorders that took place in Lviv winning 2 silver medals.
