= Gao Fangxia =

Chinese Paralympic archer

Personal information
- Born: 7 March 1982 (age 44)

Sport
- Sport: Para archery
Medal record
Archery
Representing China
Paralympic Games
Silver medal – second place	2008 Beijing	Individual recurve standing
Silver medal – second place	2012 London	Team recurve open
Asian Para Games
Bronze medal – third place	2010 Guangzhou	Individual recurve standing

Gao Fangxia (Chinese: 高芳霞; pinyin: Gāo Fāngxiá) is a Chinese paralympic archer. She won the silver medal at the Women's individual recurve - Standing event at the 2008 Summer Paralympics in Beijing.
