= Lee Hwa-sook =

South Korean Paralympic archer

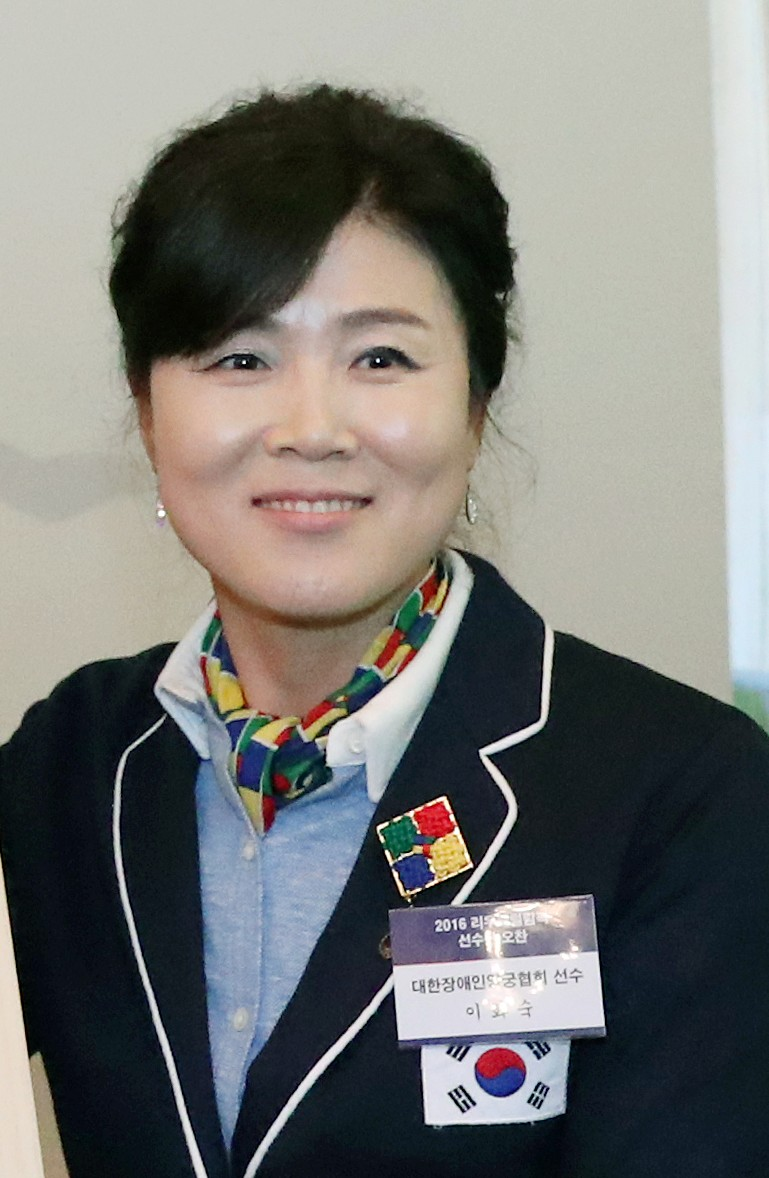

Personal information
- Born: 4 June 1966 (age 60)

Sport
- Sport: Para archery
Medal record
Archery
Representing South Korea
Paralympic Games
Gold medal – first place	2008 Beijing	Individual recurve - Standing
Gold medal – first place	2012 London	Team recurve open
Silver medal – second place	2008 Beijing	Team recurve
World Para-Archery Championships
Silver medal – second place	2025 Gwangju	Women's double Recurve open
Asian Para Games
Gold medal – first place	2010 Guangzhou	Team recurve

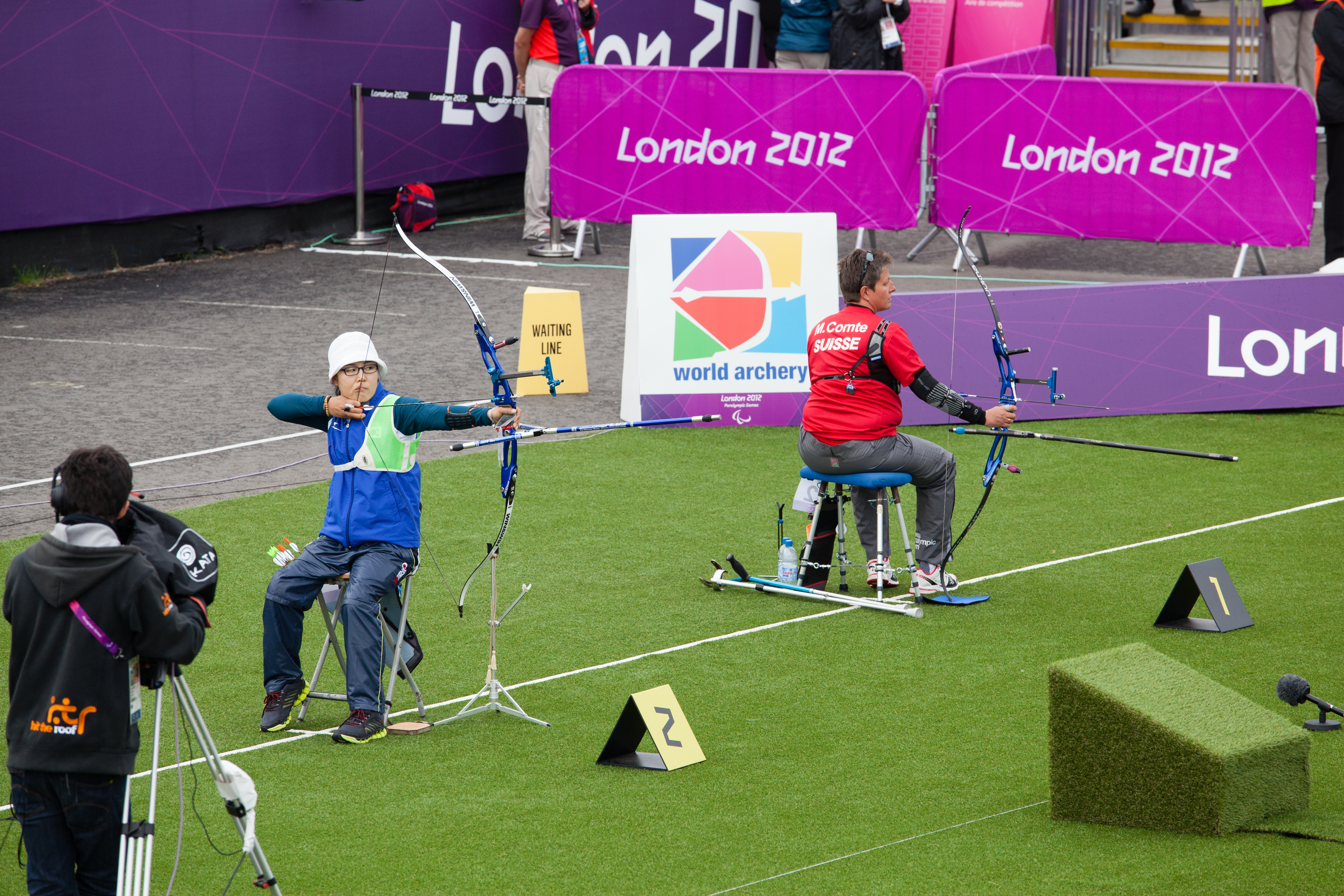
Lee Hwa-sook and Magali Comte at the 2012 Summer Paralympics

Lee Hwa Sook (Korean: 이화숙) is a South Korean paralympic archer.

== Career ==
Sook won the gold medal at the Women's individual recurve - Standing event at the 2008 Summer Paralympics in Beijing. she defeated Gao Fangxia of China 103-92 in the final at the Olympic Green Archery Field in Beijing.
