= Miroslava Černá =

Czech Paralympic archer (born 1972)

Personal information
- Born: 16 June 1972 (age 54) Žatec, Czechoslovakia
Medal record
Archery
Representing Czech Republic
Paralympic Games
Bronze medal – third place	2008 Beijing	Women's team recurve

Miroslava Černá (born 16 June 1972) is a Czech former paralympic archer. She won the bronze medal at the Women's team recurve event at the 2008 Summer Paralympics in Beijing. Since 2017, Černá has been a coach for the team.
