= Yan Huilian =

Chinese Paralympic archer (born 1983)

Medal record

Women's archery

Representing China

Paralympic Games
Gold medal – first place	2012 London	Individual Recurve - Standing
Silver medal – second place	2012 London	Team Recurve - Open

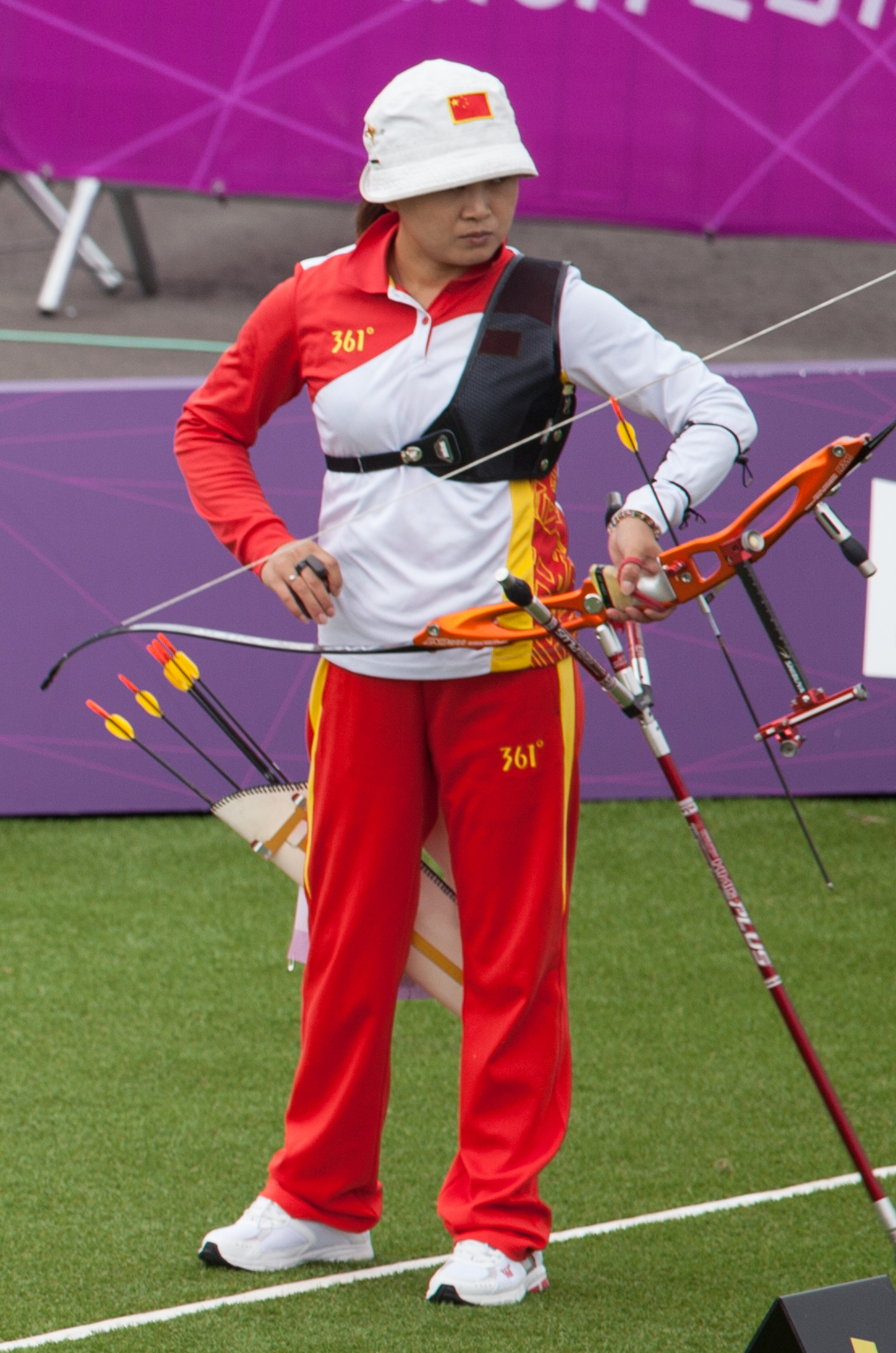
Yan Huilian (1) at the 2012 Paralympics

Yan Huilian (born 18 June 1983) is a Chinese archer. She won individual event in the 2012 Summer Paralympics and was second in the team event.
