= Kate Murray (archer) =

Personal information
- Born: 30 August 1948 Bonchester Bridge, Scotland
- Died: 28 August 2023 (aged 74)

Sport
- Sport: Archery
Medal record
Representing Great Britain
World Championships
Bronze medal – third place	2007 Cheongju	Individual recurve W2
European Championships
Silver medal – second place	2010 Vichy	Recurve mixed team
Bronze medal – third place	2014 Nottwil	Compound mixed team

Kate Murray (30 August 1948 – 28 August 2023) was a British Paralympic archer who competed in international archery competitions. She competed at the 2008 and 2012 Summer Paralympics where she was the oldest competitor in the competition.

Murray died in 2023 at the age of 74.
