= Markéta Sidková =

Czech Paralympic archer (born 1986)

Personal information
- Born: 31 December 1986 (age 39) Ostrava, Ostrava Region, Czechoslovakia
Medal record
Archery
Representing Czech Republic
Paralympic Games
| Bronze medal – third place | 2008 Beijing | Women's team recurve |

Markéta Sidková (born 31 December 1986 in Ostrava) is a Czech paralympic archer. She won the bronze medal at the Women's team recurve event at the 2008 Summer Paralympics in Beijing.
