= Xiao Yanhong =

Chinese Paralympic archer

Personal information
- Born: 6 October 1978 (age 47)

Sport
- Sport: Para archery
Medal record
Archery
Representing China
Paralympic Games
| Silver medal – second place | 2012 London | Team recurve open |
| Bronze medal – third place | 2008 Beijing | Individual recurve W1/W2 |
World Championships
| Gold medal – first place | 2011 Turin | Individual recurve W1/W2 |
| Silver medal – second place | 2013 Bangkok | Individual recurve W1/W2 |
Asian Para Games
| Silver medal – second place | 2010 Guangzhou | Individual recurve W1/W2 |

Xiao Yanhong is a Chinese paralympic archer. She won the bronze medal at the Women's individual recurve - W1/W2 event at the 2008 Summer Paralympics in Beijing.
