= Lenka Kuncová =

Czech Paralympic archer (born 1971)

Personal information
- Born: 21 July 1971 (age 54) Čeladná
Medal record
Archery
Representing Czech Republic
Paralympic Games
Bronze medal – third place	2008 Beijing	Women's team recurve

Lenka Kuncová (born 21 July 1971 in Čeladná) is a Czech paralympic archer. She won the bronze medal at the Women's team recurve event at the 2008 Summer Paralympics in Beijing.
