= Japan at the 2004 Summer Paralympics =

- IPC code: JPN
- NPC: Japan Paralympic Committee
- Website: www.jsad.or.jp (in Japanese)

in Athens
- Competitors: 162 in 15 sports
- Medals Ranked 10th: Gold 17 Silver 15 Bronze 20 Total 52

Summer Paralympics appearances (overview)
- 1964; 1968; 1972; 1976; 1980; 1984; 1988; 1992; 1996; 2000; 2004; 2008; 2012; 2016; 2020; 2024

Japan competed at the 2004 Summer Paralympics in Athens, Greece. The team included 162 athletes—108 men and 54 women. Japanese competitors won 52 medals, 17 gold, 15 silver and 20 bronze, to finish 10th in the medal table.

== Medallists ==
| Medal | Name | Sport | Event |
|---|---|---|---|
| Gold | Toshihiro Takada | Athletics | Men's 400m T52 |
| Gold | Choke Yasuoka | Athletics | Men's 800m T54 |
| Gold | Toshihiro Takada | Athletics | Men's 5000m T52 |
| Gold | Yuichi Takahashi | Athletics | Men's marathon T11 |
| Gold | Toshihiro Takada | Athletics | Men's marathon T52 |
| Gold | Wakako Tsuchida | Athletics | Women's 5000m T54 |
| Gold | Kazu Hatanaka | Athletics | Women's marathon T54 |
| Gold | Satoshi Fujimoto | Judo | Men's 66 kg |
| Gold | Junichi Kawai | Swimming | Men's 50m freestyle S11 |
| Gold | Mayumi Narita | Swimming | Women's 50m freestyle S4 |
| Gold | Mayumi Narita | Swimming | Women's 100m freestyle S4 |
| Gold | Mayumi Narita | Swimming | Women's 200m freestyle S4 |
| Gold | Mayumi Narita | Swimming | Women's 50m breaststroke SB3 |
| Gold | Mayumi Narita | Swimming | Women's 50m backstroke S4 |
| Gold | Mayumi Narita | Swimming | Women's 150m individual medley SM4 |
| Gold | Erika Nara; Noriko Kajiwara; Takako Fujita; Mayumi Narita | Swimming | Women's 4 × 50 m freestyle relay 20pts |
| Gold | Shingo Kunieda; Satoshi Saida | Wheelchair tennis | Men's doubles |
| Silver | Naomi Isozaki | Archery | Women's W1/W2 |
| Silver | Koichi Minami; Kimimasa Onodera; Shinji Sakoda | Archery | Men's team open |
| Silver | Choke Yasuoka | Athletics | Men's 400m T54 |
| Silver | Toshie Oi | Athletics | Men's discus F53 |
| Silver | Wakako Tsuchida | Athletics | Women's marathon T54 |
| Silver | Kyoko Sato | Athletics | Women's discus F32-34/51-53 |
| Silver | Takuya Oki; Shigeo Yoshihara | Cycling | Men's tandem sprint B1-3 |
| Silver | Makoto Hirose | Judo | Men's 60 kg |
| Silver | Yuji Kato | Judo | Men's 81 kg |
| Silver | Yuji Hanada | Swimming | Men's 50m freestyle S4 |
| Silver | Yuji Hanada | Swimming | Men's 100m freestyle S4 |
| Silver | Junichi Kawai | Swimming | Men's 100m freestyle S11 |
| Silver | Junichi Kawai | Swimming | Men's 100m butterfly S11 |
| Silver | Daisuke Ejima; Takayuki Suzuki; Daisuke Maeda; Yuji Hanada | Swimming | Men's 4 × 50 m medley relay 20pts |
| Silver | Rina Akiyama | Swimming | Women's 100m backstroke S11 |
| Silver | Satoko Fujiwara; Tomoko Fukuzawa | Table tennis | Women's teams class 1–3 |
| Bronze | Nako Hirasawa | Archery | Women's W1/W2 |
| Bronze | Jun Hiromichi | Athletics | Men's 800m T53 |
| Bronze | Toshihiro Takada | Athletics | Men's 1500m T52 |
| Bronze | Masazumi Soejima; Susumu Kangawa; Yoshifumi Nagao; Choke Yasuoka | Athletics | Men's 4 × 400 m relay T53/54 |
| Bronze | Mineho Ozaki | Athletics | Men's javelin F11 |
| Bronze | Yuki Kato | Athletics | Women's 100m T36 |
| Bronze | Noriko Arai | Athletics | Women's 200m T34 |
| Bronze | Eriko Kikuchi | Athletics | Women's 200m T36 |
| Bronze | Mutsuhiko Ogawa | Cycling | Men's tricycle road race CP 1/2 |
| Bronze | Mieko Asai; Masae Komiya; Eriko Kumakawa; Yuka Naoi; Yuki Naoi; Madoka Sano | Goalball | Women's team |
| Bronze | Keiji Amakawa | Judo | Men's +100 kg |
| Bronze | Yuji Hanada | Swimming | Men's 200m freestyle S4 |
| Bronze | Hiroshi Karube | Swimming | Men's 50m breaststroke SB3 |
| Bronze | Tomotaro Nakamura | Swimming | Men's 100m breaststroke SB7 |
| Bronze | Junichi Kawai | Swimming | Men's 100m backstroke S11 |
| Bronze | Yoshikazu Sakai | Swimming | Men's 100m backstroke S12 |
| Bronze | Junichi Kawai; Shusaku Suguichi; Kosei Egawa; Yoshikazu Sakai | Swimming | Men's 4 × 100 m freestyle relay 49pts |
| Bronze | Erika Nara | Swimming | Women's 50m freestyle S6 |
| Bronze | Erika Nara | Swimming | Women's 100m freestyle S6 |
| Bronze | Mayumi Narita; Noriko Kajiwara; Erika Nara; Takako Fujita | Swimming | Women's 4 × 50 m medley relay 20pts |

== Sports ==
=== Archery ===
==== Men ====
| Athlete | Event | Ranking round | | Round of 32 | Round of 16 | Quarterfinals | Semifinals | Finals | |
| Athlete | Event | Score | Seed | Opposition score | Opposition score | Opposition score | Opposition score | Opposition score | Rank |
|---|---|---|---|---|---|---|---|---|---|
| Koichi Minami | Men's individual W1 | 617 | 6 | —N/a | Lear (USA); W 150–133 | Sebek (CZE); L 95–103 | Did not advance | | |
| Kimimasa Onodera | Men's individual standing | 628 | 2 | —N/a | Rad (IRI); L 141–142 | Did not advance | | | |
| Shinji Sakodo | Men's individual W2 | 596 | 15 | Peemthong (THA); W 145–144 | de Pellegrin (ITA); L 147–151 | Did not advance | | | |
| Koichi Minami; Kimimasa Onodera; Shinji Sakodo | Men's team open | 1840 | 3 | —N/a | | Ukraine (UKR); W 226–206 | United States (USA); W 215–0 | South Korea (KOR); L 236–223 | 2nd place, silver medalist(s) |

In the men's team open semifinal against United States, a zero score was recorded due to the "infringement of IPC rules".

==== Women ====
| Athlete | Event | Ranking round | | Round of 32 | Round of 16 | Quarterfinals | Semifinals | Finals | |
| Athlete | Event | Score | Seed | Opposition score | Opposition score | Opposition score | Opposition score | Opposition score | Rank |
|---|---|---|---|---|---|---|---|---|---|
| Nako Hirasawa | Women's individual W1/W2 | 613 WR | 1 | —N/a | Hakobyan (ARM); W 142–101 | Smith (GBR); W 96–95 | Fantato (ITA); L 88–96 | Ko (KOR); W 99–90 | 3rd place, bronze medalist(s) |
| Naomi Isozaki | Women's individual W1/W2 | 593 | 3 | —N/a | Menconi (ITA); W 129–128 | Sidkova (CZE); W 94–85 | Ko (KOR); W 91–89 | Fantato (ITA); L 83–97 | 2nd place, silver medalist(s) |
| Aya Nakanishi | Women's individual W1/W2 | 526 | 13 | —N/a | Fantato (ITA); L 127–154 | Did not advance | | | |
| Masako Yonezawa | Women's individual standing | 522 | 11 | —N/a | Lee K H (KOR); W 134–126 | M Olejnik (POL); L 95–99 | Did not advance | | |
| Nako Hirasawa; Naomi Isozaki; Aya Nakanishi | Women's team open | 1732 WR | 1 | —N/a | | Bye | Great Britain (GBR); L 191–197 | South Korea (KOR); L 201–213 | 4 |

=== Athletics ===
==== Men's track ====
| Athlete | Class | Event | Heats | | Semifinal | | Final | |
| Athlete | Class | Event | Result | Rank | Result | Rank | Result | Rank |
|---|---|---|---|---|---|---|---|---|
| Shiro Fukudome | T13 | Marathon | —N/a | | | | 2:51:56 | 11 |
| Yoshihide Fukuhara | T11 | 10000m | —N/a | | | | 35:52.89 | 8 |
| Yoshihide Fukuhara | T11 | Marathon | —N/a | | | | 2:53:56 | 4 |
| Nobukazu Hanaoka | T54 | 1500m | 3:05.80 | 15 q | 3:05.53 | 8 | Did not advance | |
| Nobukazu Hanaoka | T54 | Marathon | —N/a | | | | 1:31:50 | 6 |
| Jun Hiromichi | T53 | 200m | 29.43 | 20 | Did not advance | | | |
| Jun Hiromichi | T53 | 800m | 1:40.58 | 5 Q | —N/a | | 1:38.84 | 3rd place, bronze medalist(s) |
| Jun Hiromichi | T53 | 1500m | 3:08.32 | 19 Q | 3:08.34 | 12 | Did not advance | |
| Jun Hiromichi | T54 | 10000m | 21:50.31 | 18 | Did not advance | | | |
| Jun Hiromichi | T54 | Marathon | —N/a | | | | 1:40:24 | 16 |
| Kiyoshi Hoshina | T11 | Marathon | —N/a | | | | 2:56:30 | 5 |
| Tomoya Ito | T52 | 800m | DNS | | Did not advance | | | |
| Tomoya Ito | T52 | 1500m | 4:04.88 | 6 Q | —N/a | | DNF | |
| Tomoya Ito | T52 | 5000m | —N/a | | | | 13:48.42 | 4 |
| Tomoya Ito | T52 | Marathon | —N/a | | | | 2:20:12 | 4 |
| Susumu Kangawa | T53 | 100m | 16.83 | 18 | Did not advance | | | |
| Susumu Kangawa | T53 | 200m | 28.29 | 16 | Did not advance | | | |
| Susumu Kangawa | T53 | 800m | 2:09.10 | 12 | Did not advance | | | |
| Kenji Kotani | T42 | 200m | —N/a | | | | 27.59 | 5 |
| Yoshifumi Nagao | T54 | 100m | 14.96 | 10 q | 14.87 | 5 Q | 15.06 | 7 |
| Yoshifumi Nagao | T54 | 200m | 25.92 | 6 Q | —N/a | | 26.09 | 6 |
| Naohiro Ninomiya | T46 | 1500m | —N/a | | | | 4:04.49 | 5 |
| Naohiro Ninomiya | T46 | 5000m | —N/a | | | | 15:57.16 | 13 |
| Koji Saito | T11 | 100m | 12.09 | 13 | Did not advance | | | |
| Koji Saito | T11 | 200m | 24.64 | 14 | Did not advance | | | |
| Hiroki Sasahara | T54 | 10000m | 21:11.38 | 10 | Did not advance | | | |
| Hiroki Sasahara | T54 | Marathon | —N/a | | | | 1:33:55 | 9 |
| Masazumi Soejima | T54 | 10000m | 21:12.33 | 11 | Did not advance | | | |
| Masazumi Soejima | T54 | Marathon | —N/a | | | | 1:34:59 | 10 |
| Toshihiro Takada | T52 | 400m | —N/a | | | | | 1st place, gold medalist(s) |
| Toshihiro Takada | T52 | 800m | DNS | | Did not advance | | | |
| Toshihiro Takada | T52 | 1500m | 4:03.73 | 4 Q | —N/a | | 3:49.76 | 3rd place, bronze medalist(s) |
| Toshihiro Takada | T52 | 5000m | —N/a | | | | 13:10.86 PR | 1st place, gold medalist(s) |
| Toshihiro Takada | T52 | Marathon | —N/a | | | | 2:00:02 | 1st place, gold medalist(s) |
| Yuichi Takahashi | T11 | 5000m | —N/a | | | | DNF | |
| Yuichi Takahashi | T11 | 10000m | —N/a | | | | 34:36.69 | 4 |
| Yuichi Takahashi | T11 | Marathon | —N/a | | | | 2:44:24 | 1st place, gold medalist(s) |
| Masanori Ueda | T51 | 200m | —N/a | | | | 41.03 | 4 |
| Yasunari Yaezawa | T52 | 100m | —N/a | | | | 18.65 | 7 |
| Yasunari Yaezawa | T52 | 200m | 35.21 | 8 Q | N/A | | 34.98 | 8 |
| Shigeki Yano | T11 | 100m | 11.95 | 10 q | 11.86 | 8 B | 11.93 | 4 |
| Shigeki Yano | T11 | 200m | 24.39 | 11 q | 24.36 | 10 | Did not advance | |
| Choke Yasuoka | T54 | 400m | —N/a | | | | | 2nd place, silver medalist(s) |
| Choke Yasuoka | T54 | 800m | 1:34.59 PR | 1 Q | —N/a | | 1:32.45 PR | 1st place, gold medalist(s) |
| Choke Yasuoka | T54 | 1500m | 3:00.43 | 2 Q | 3:22.32 | 17 | Did not advance | |
| Choke Yasuoka | T54 | 5000m | 10:24.95 | 3 Q | —N/a | | 10:26.63 | 10 |
| Choke Yasuoka | T54 | Marathon | —N/a | | | | DNS | |
| Susumu Kangawa; Yoshifumi Nagao; Masazumi Soejima; Choke Yasuoka | T53/54 | 4 × 400 m relay | 3:15.25 | 1 Q | —N/a | | 3:16.57 | 3rd place, bronze medalist(s) |

==== Men's field ====
| Athlete | Class | Event | Final | | |
| Athlete | Class | Event | Result | Points | Rank |
|---|---|---|---|---|---|
| Takefumi Anryo | F32/51 | Club throw | 25.63 | 900 | 6 |
| Kenji Kotani | F42 | Long jump | 5.25 | - | 4 |
| Toshie Oi | F53 | Discus | 25.03 | - | 2nd place, silver medalist(s) |
| Shigeo Osemachi | F12 | Javelin | 44.55 | - | 10 |
| Mineho Ozaki | F11 | Javelin | 40.90 | - | 3rd place, bronze medalist(s) |
| Mineho Ozaki | F11 | Long jump | 5.45 | - | 13 |
| Toru Suzuki | F44/46 | High jump | 1.80 | - | 7 |

==== Women's track ====
| Athlete | Class | Event | Heats | | Semifinal | | Final | |
| Athlete | Class | Event | Result | Rank | Result | Rank | Result | Rank |
|---|---|---|---|---|---|---|---|---|
| Noriko Arai | T34 | 100m | —N/a | | | | 20.50 | 4 |
| Noriko Arai | T34 | 200m | —N/a | | | | 36.08 | 3rd place, bronze medalist(s) |
| Kazu Hatanaka | T54 | 5000m | 12:19.66 | 7 Q | —N/a | | DNF | |
| Kazu Hatanaka | T54 | Marathon | —N/a | | | | 1:49:26 | 1st place, gold medalist(s) |
| Yuki Kato | T36 | 100m | —N/a | | | | 15.53 | 3rd place, bronze medalist(s) |
| Yuki Kato | T36 | 200m | —N/a | | | | 32.63 | 4 |
| Yumi Kawashima | T54 | 800m | 1:55.76 | 11 | Did not advance | | | |
| Yumi Kawashima | T54 | 5000m | 12:53.38 | 9 Q | —N/a | | 12:52.28 | 12 |
| Eriko Kikuchi | T36 | 100m | —N/a | | | | 15.72 | 4 |
| Eriko Kikuchi | T36 | 200m | —N/a | | | | 32.30 | 3rd place, bronze medalist(s) |
| Wakako Tsuchida | T54 | 5000m | 11:59.74 PR | 1 Q | —N/a | | 11:59.51 PR | 1st place, gold medalist(s) |
| Wakako Tsuchida | T54 | Marathon | —N/a | | | | 1:50:13 | 2nd place, silver medalist(s) |
| Miki Yoda | T52 | 200m | 42.40 | 6 Q | —N/a | | 43.27 | 5 |
| Miki Yoda | T52 | 400m | 1:23.42 | 4 Q | —N/a | | 1:24.13 | 6 |

==== Women's field ====
| Athlete | Class | Event | Final | | |
| Athlete | Class | Event | Result | Points | Rank |
|---|---|---|---|---|---|
| Katsuko Nakajima | F37 | Discus | 19.74 | 709 | 10 |
| Katsuko Nakajima | F37/38 | Shot put | 8.19 | 889 | 10 |
| Kyoko Sato | F32-34/52/53 | Discus | 11.09 | 1289 | 2nd place, silver medalist(s) |
| Kyoko Sato | F32-34/52/53 | Shot put | 5.01 | 1118 | 4 |
| Mami Sato | F44/46 | Long jump | 3.95 | 982 | 9 |

=== Cycling ===
==== Men's road ====
| Athlete | Event | Time | Rank |
|---|---|---|---|
| Takuya Oki; Shigeo Yoshihara | Men's road race / time trial tandem B1-3 | 33:38 | 18 |
| Tatsuyuki Oshiro; Hideki Tanzawa | Men's road race / time trial tandem B1-3 | - | 17 |
| Mutsuhiko Ogawa | Men's tricycle road race CP div 1/2 | 48:14 | 3rd place, bronze medalist(s) |
| Mutsuhiko Ogawa | Men's tricycle time trial CP div 1/2 | 10:32.26 | 5 |
| Akio Sakuma | Men's road race / time trial LC1 | - | 13 |

==== Men's track ====
| Athlete | Event | Qualification | | Quarterfinals | Semifinals | Final | |
| Athlete | Event | Time | Rank | Time | Time | Opposition Time | Rank |
|---|---|---|---|---|---|---|---|
| Takuya Oki; Shigeo Yoshihara | Men's 1km time trial tandem B1-3 | —N/a | | | | 1:06.93 | 4 |
| Takuya Oki; Shigeo Yoshihara | Men's individual pursuit tandem B1-3 | 5:06.20 | 16 | Did not advance | | | |
| Takuya Oki; Shigeo Yoshihara | Men's sprint tandem B1-3 | 10.997 | 5 Q | Storey (GBR) / Gordon (GBR); W/O | Modra (AUS) / Short (AUS); L 0–2 | Biddle (AUS) / Stewart (AUS); W 2–1 | 3 |
| Tatsuyuki Oshiro; Shigeo Yoshihara | Men's 1km time trial tandem B1-3 | —N/a | | | | 1:05.91 | 4 |
| Tatsuyuki Oshiro; Shigeo Yoshihara | Men's individual pursuit tandem B1-3 | 4:57.42 | 15 | Did not advance | | | |
| Tatsuyuki Oshiro; Shigeo Yoshihara | Men's sprint tandem B1-3 | 11.237 | 8 Q | Modra (AUS) / Short (AUS); L 0–2 | N/A | Janowski (FRA) / Senmartin (FRA); W 11.286 | 7 |
| Akio Sakuma | Men's 1km time trial LC1-4 | —N/a | | | | 1:16.92 | 26 |
| Akio Sakuma | Men's individual pursuit LC1 | 5:36.29 | 12 | Did not advance | | | |

Despite being in the bronze medal match, Shigeo Yoshihara and Takuya Oki won the event against Anthony Biddle and Kial Stewart, in the gold medal match, Slovak cyclists Vladislav Janovjak and Juraj Petrovic were disqualified and were stripped of the silver medals after Petrovic was tested positive for glucocorticosteroid and methylprednisolone.

=== Goalball ===
The women's goalball team won a bronze medal after defeating Finland.

==== Players ====
- Mieko Asai
- Masae Komiya
- Eriko Kumakawa
- Yuka Naoi
- Yuki Naoi
- Madoka Sano

==== Results ====
| Game | Match | Score | Rank |
| 1 | Japan vs. Canada (CAN) | 0 – 2 | 3 Q |
| 2 | Japan vs. United States (USA) | 1 – 6 | 3 Q |
| 3 | Japan vs. Finland (FIN) | 2 – 1 | 3 Q |
| 4 | Japan vs. Netherlands (NED) | 1 – 1 | 3 Q |
| 5 | Japan vs. Germany (GER) | 6 – 3 | 3 Q |
| 6 | Japan vs. Brazil (BRA) | 4 – 3 | 3 Q |
| 7 | Japan vs. Greece (GRE) | 2 – 1 | 3 Q |
| Semifinals | Japan vs. United States (USA) | 1 – 3 | L |
| Bronze medal final | Japan vs. Finland (FIN) | 2 – 1 | 3rd place, bronze medalist(s) |

=== Judo ===
==== Men ====
| Athlete | Event | Preliminary | Quarterfinals | Semifinals | Repechage round 1 | Repechage round 2 | Final/ Bronze medal contest |
| Athlete | Event | Opposition Result | Opposition Result | Opposition Result | Opposition Result | Opposition Result | Opposition Result |
|---|---|---|---|---|---|---|---|
| Keiji Amakawa | Men's +100kg | A Silva (BRA); W 1012-0020S | Akaev (RUS); L 0001S-0002S | —N/a | Looi (MAS); W 1000–0000 | —N/a | Campos Ariza (ESP); W 0201S-0001S (bronze) |
| Satoshi Fujimoto | Men's 66kg | Kail (GBR); W 0051–0000 | Viera (URU); W 1000–0000 | Shabashov (RUS); W 1010–0000 | —N/a | | Garcia del Valle (ESP); W 0010-0000 (gold) |
| Makoto Hirose | Men's 60kg | Bye | Zasyadkovych (UKR); W 1022–0000S | Rahmati (IRI); W 1000–0000 | —N/a | | Perez (CUB); W/O (silver) |
| Yuji Kato | Men's 81kg | Bye | Junk (GER); W 1010–0000 | Vincze (HUN); W 0010–0001 | —N/a | | Jonard (FRA); L 0000-1000 (silver) |
| Yoshikazu Matsumoto | Men's 100kg | Szott (USA); L 0001C-0011 | —N/a | | Papachristos (GRE); L 0001S-1001S | Did not advance | |
| Eiji Miyauchi | Men's 90kg | Mirhassan Nattaj (IRI); W 0200C-0022K | Cugnon (FRA); L 0001S-1011S | —N/a | | Stoskus (LTU); L 0001-1000S | Did not advance |

Sergio Arturo Perez was disqualified and stripped of his gold medal after being found to be tested positive for an inflammatory drug prednisolone. Makoto Hirose was awarded a silver medal.

==== Women ====
| Athlete | Event | Quarterfinals | Semifinals | Repechage | Final/ Bronze medal contest |
| Athlete | Event | Opposition Result | Opposition Result | Opposition Result | Opposition Result |
|---|---|---|---|---|---|
| Masami Akatsuka | Women's 48kg | Arndt (GER); L 1000–0000 | —N/a | | Potapova (RUS); L 0000–1010 |

=== Powerlifting ===
==== Men ====
| Athlete | Event | Result | Rank |
|---|---|---|---|
| Hajime Ujiro | 67.5kg | 147.5 | 8 |

=== Shooting ===
==== Men ====
| Athlete | Event | Qualification | | Final | | |
| Athlete | Event | Score | Rank | Score | Total | Rank |
|---|---|---|---|---|---|---|
| Takashi Matsumoto | Mixed 10m air rifle prone SH1 | 596 | 22 | Did not advance | | |
| Takashi Matsumoto | Men's 10m air rifle standing SH1 | 572 | 16 | Did not advance | | |
| Kenji Ohashi | Men's 10m air pistol SH1 | 556 | 12 | Did not advance | | |
| Kenji Ohashi | Mixed 50m pistol SH1 | 511 | 17 | Did not advance | | |
| Hitomi Suzuki | Mixed 10m air rifle prone SH2 | 595 | 18 | Did not advance | | |
| Hitomi Suzuki | Mixed 10m air rifle standing SH2 | 575 | 23 | Did not advance | | |

==== Women ====
| Athlete | Event | Qualification | | Final | | |
| Athlete | Event | Score | Rank | Score | Total | Rank |
|---|---|---|---|---|---|---|
| Yukiko Kinoshita | Mixed 10m air rifle prone SH2 | 585 | 26 | Did not advance | | |
| Yukiko Kinoshita | Mixed 10m air rifle standing SH2 | 594 | 9 | Did not advance | | |
| Akiko Sakuraoka | Mixed 10m air rifle prone SH2 | 599 | 7 Q | 103.9 | 702.9 | 8 |
| Akiko Sakuraoka | Mixed 10m air rifle standing SH2 | 589 | 17 | Did not advance | | |
| Aki Terai | Mixed 10m air rifle prone SH1 | 599 | 8 Q | 103.7 | 702.7 | 7 |

=== Swimming ===
==== Men ====
| Athlete | Class | Event | Heats | | Final | |
| Athlete | Class | Event | Result | Rank | Result | Rank |
|---|---|---|---|---|---|---|
| Chikara Ara | S8 | 100m butterfly | 1:19.96 | 11 | Did not advance | |
| Chikara Ara | SB8 | 100m breaststroke | 1:20.80 | 6 Q | 1:20.34 | 5 |
| Kosei Egawa | S12 | 50m freestyle | 26.83 | 10 | Did not advance | |
| Kosei Egawa | S12 | 100m freestyle | 59.47 | 11 | Did not advance | |
| Kosei Egawa | S12 | 400m freestyle | 4:58.86 | 9 | Did not advance | |
| Kosei Egawa | S12 | 100m butterfly | 1:05.04 | 6 Q | 1:04.90 | 6 |
| Daisuke Ejima | S7 | 100m backstroke | 1:19.19 | 3 Q | 1:19.99 | 5 |
| Daisuke Ejima | S7 | 50m butterfly | 36.61 | 8 Q | 35.91 | 7 |
| Daisuke Ejima | SM7 | 200m individual medley | DSQ | | Did not advance | |
| Yuji Hanada | S4 | 50m freestyle | 38.43 PR | 2 Q | 37.54 | 2nd place, silver medalist(s) |
| Yuji Hanada | S4 | 100m freestyle | 1:22.77 PR | 2 Q | 1:24.62 | 2nd place, silver medalist(s) |
| Yuji Hanada | S4 | 200m freestyle | 3:02.97 | 2 Q | 3:05.65 | 3rd place, bronze medalist(s) |
| Hiroshi Hosokawa | S7 | 50m freestyle | 33.10 | 15 | Did not advance | |
| Hiroshi Hosokawa | S7 | 400m freestyle | 5:29.21 | 9 | Did not advance | |
| Hiroshi Hosokawa | S7 | 100m backstroke | 1:22.76 | 7 Q | 1:22.94 | 7 |
| Hiroshi Karube | SB3 | 50m breaststroke | 54.78 | 3 Q | 55.18 | 3rd place, bronze medalist(s) |
| Hiroshi Karube | SM4 | 150m individual medley | 3:14.88 | 13 | Did not advance | |
| Junichi Kawai | S11 | 50m freestyle | 27.22 | 1 Q | 26.64 | 1st place, gold medalist(s) |
| Junichi Kawai | S11 | 100m freestyle | 1:05.16 | 4 Q | 1:00.86 | 2nd place, silver medalist(s) |
| Junichi Kawai | S11 | 100m backstroke | 1:18.05 | 5 Q | 1:12.11 | 3rd place, bronze medalist(s) |
| Junichi Kawai | S11 | 100m butterfly | 1:08.51 | 1 Q | 1:06.76 | 2nd place, silver medalist(s) |
| Junichi Kawai | SM11 | 200m individual medley | N/A | | 2:36.77 | 4 |
| Jumpei Kimura | SB6 | 100m breaststroke | N/A | | 1:41.96 | 6 |
| Daisuke Maeda | S6 | 50m freestyle | 35.14 | 14 | Did not advance | |
| Daisuke Maeda | S6 | 100m freestyle | 1:16.14 | 12 | Did not advance | |
| Daisuke Maeda | S6 | 50m butterfly | 38.31 | 11 | Did not advance | |
| Tomotaro Nakamura | SB7 | 100m breaststroke | 1:25.02 | 2 Q | 1:25.72 | 3rd place, bronze medalist(s) |
| Yoshikazu Sakai | S12 | 100m freestyle | 58.90 | 7 Q | 59.05 | 7 |
| Yoshikazu Sakai | S12 | 400m freestyle | 4:46.16 | 7 Q | 4:44.48 | 7 |
| Yoshikazu Sakai | S12 | 100m backstroke | 1:06.55 | 4 Q | 1:04.99 | 3rd place, bronze medalist(s) |
| Yoshikazu Sakai | S12 | 100m butterfly | 1:04.09 | 5 Q | 1:04.05 | 5 |
| Yoshikazu Sakai | SM12 | 200m individual medley | 2:27.85 | 6 Q | 2:27.93 | 6 |
| Ryuji Sakimoto | S9 | 400m freestyle | 4:59.14 | 13 | Did not advance | |
| Ryuji Sakimoto | S9 | 100m backstroke | 1:13.96 | 17 | Did not advance | |
| Koshiro Sugita | S12 | 100m butterfly | 1:20.73 | 12 | Did not advance | |
| Koshiro Sugita | SB12 | 100m breaststroke | 1:20.14 | 13 | Did not advance | |
| Koshiro Sugita | SM12 | 200m individual medley | 2:44.97 | 12 | Did not advance | |
| Shusaku Sugiuchi | S13 | 50m freestyle | 27.44 | 11 | Did not advance | |
| Shusaku Sugiuchi | S13 | 100m freestyle | 1:00.85 | 10 | Did not advance | |
| Shusaku Sugiuchi | S13 | 100m butterfly | 1:08.61 | 8 Q | 1:07.97 | 8 |
| Shusaku Sugiuchi | SB13 | 100m breaststroke | 1:16.23 | 4 Q | 1:14.48 | 4 |
| Takayuki Suzuki | S5 | 100m freestyle | 1:29.21 | 7 Q | 1:29.99 | 7 |
| Takayuki Suzuki | SM4 | 150m individual medley | 2:57.71 | 6 Q | 2:58.61 | 8 |
| Takuro Yamada | S9 | 50m freestyle | 28.03 | 10 | Did not advance | |
| Takuro Yamada | S9 | 400m freestyle | 4:40.18 | 9 | Did not advance | |
| Yuji Hanada; Hiroshi Karube; Daisuke Maeda; Takayuki Suzuki | N/A | 4 × 50 m freestyle relay (20pts) | 2:37.96 | 2 Q | 2:39.78 | 4 |
| Chikara Ara; Jumpei Kimura; Ryuji Sakimoto; Takuro Yamada | N/A | 4 × 100 m freestyle relay (34pts) | 4:33.01 | 10 | Did not advance | |
| Kosei Egawa; Junichi Kawai; Yoshikazu Sakai; Shusaku Sugiuchi | N/A | 4 × 100 m freestyle relay (49pts) | N/A | | 3:57.73 | 3rd place, bronze medalist(s) |
| Kosei Egawa; Junichi Kawai; Yoshikazu Sakai; Shusaku Sugiuchi | N/A | 4 × 100 m medley relay (49pts) | N/A | | 4:23.66 | 4 |
| Daisuke Ejima; Yuji Hanada; Daisuke Maeda; Takayuki Sakai | N/A | 4 × 50 m medley relay (20pts) | 2:44.30 | 1 Q | 2:42.52 | 2nd place, silver medalist(s) |
| Chikara Ara; Hiroshi Hosokawa; Ryuji Sakimoto; Takuro Yamada | N/A | 4 × 100 m medley relay (34pts) | 4:54.41 | 9 | Did not advance | |

==== Women ====
| Athlete | Class | Event | Heats | | Final | |
| Athlete | Class | Event | Result | Rank | Result | Rank |
|---|---|---|---|---|---|---|
| Rina Akiyama | S11 | 100m backstroke | 1:28.10 | 5 Q | 1:23.63 | 2nd place, silver medalist(s) |
| Rina Akiyama | S11 | 50m freestyle | 36.77 | 11 | Did not advance | |
| Rina Akiyama | S11 | 100m freestyle | 1:23.84 | 10 | Did not advance | |
| Rina Akiyama | SB11 | 100m breaststroke | 1:47.00 | 7 Q | 1:46.99 | 8 |
| Rina Akiyama | SM11 | 200m individual medley | N/A | | 3:26.92 | 6 |
| Takako Fujita | S5 | 50m freestyle | 53.27 | 9 | Did not advance | |
| Takako Fujita | S5 | 100m freestyle | 1:50.82 | 11 | Did not advance | |
| Takako Fujita | S5 | 200m freestyle | 3:57.69 | 9 | Did not advance | |
| Takako Fujita | SB3 | 50m breaststroke | 1:17.03 | 9 | Did not advance | |
| Noriko Kajiwara | SB4 | 100m breaststroke | 2:01.50 | 2 Q | 2:01.15 | 4 |
| Yuri Kitamura | SB5 | 100m breaststroke | N/A | | 2:07.64 | 6 |
| Erika Nara | S6 | 50m butterfly | 53.34 | 13 | Did not advance | |
| Erika Nara | S6 | 50m freestyle | 37.66 | 1 Q | 37.65 | 3rd place, bronze medalist(s) |
| Erika Nara | S6 | 100m freestyle | 1:25.52 | 5 Q | 1:22.87 | 3rd place, bronze medalist(s) |
| Erika Nara | S6 | 400m freestyle | 6:13.77 | 2 Q | 6:14.65 | 5 |
| Mayumi Narita | S4 | 50m backstroke | 51.08 | 1 Q | 49.54 WR | 1st place, gold medalist(s) |
| Mayumi Narita | S4 | 50m freestyle | 44.90 | 1 Q | 39.22 WR | 1st place, gold medalist(s) |
| Mayumi Narita | S4 | 100m freestyle | 1:32.70 | 1 Q | 1:25.07 WR | 1st place, gold medalist(s) |
| Mayumi Narita | S4 | 200m freestyle | 3:20.50 | 1 Q | 3:02.00 WR | 1st place, gold medalist(s) |
| Mayumi Narita | SB3 | 50m breaststroke | 57.24 | 1 Q | 56.20 WR | 1st place, gold medalist(s) |
| Mayumi Narita | SM4 | 150m individual medley | 2:51.67 WR | 1 Q | 2:45.20 WR | 1st place, gold medalist(s) |
| Mitsuki Yamauchi | SB9 | 100m breaststroke | 1:28.68 | 5 Q | 1:28.70 | 5 |
| Miyuki Yasuda | S7 | 50m freestyle | 38.34 | 11 | Did not advance | |
| Miyuki Yasuda | S7 | 100m freestyle | 1:26.13 | 13 | Did not advance | |
| Miyuki Yasuda | S7 | 400m freestyle | 6:13.36 | 8 Q | 6:18.23 | 8 |
| Takako Fujita; Noriko Kajiwara; Erika Nara; Mayumi Narita | N/A | 4 × 50 m freestyle relay (20pts) | N/A | | 3:00.62 WR | 1st place, gold medalist(s) |
| Takako Fujita; Noriko Kajiwara; Erika Nara; Mayumi Narita | N/A | 4 × 50 m medley relay (20pts) | N/A | | 3:33.11 | 3rd place, bronze medalist(s) |

=== Table tennis ===
==== Men ====
| Athlete | Event | Preliminaries | | | | Quarterfinals | Semifinals | Final / BM | |
| Athlete | Event | Opposition Result | Opposition Result | Opposition Result | Rank | Opposition Result | Opposition Result | Opposition Result | Rank |
|---|---|---|---|---|---|---|---|---|---|
| Nobuhiro Minami | Men's singles 2 | Molliens (FRA); W 3–1 | Kim K M (KOR); L 0–3 | Kristjansson (ISL); W 3–0 | 3 | Did not advance | | | |
| Hatsuo Ono | Men's singles 6 | Rosenmeier (DEN); L 1–3 | Buzin (RUS); L 0–3 | P du Plooy (RSA); L 0–3 | 4 | Did not advance | | | |
| Shigekazu Tomioka | Men's singles 9 | Leibovitz (USA); W 3–0 | Rahbari (IRI); W 3–0 | Rakic (CRO); W 3–0 | 1 Q | Lu (CHN); L 1–3 | Did not advance | | |
| Nobuhiro Minami; Toshihiko Oka | Men's teams 5 | Czech Republic (CZE); L 1–3 | Germany (GER); L 2–3 | —N/a | 3 | Did not advance | | | |
| Hatsuo Ono; Shigekazu Tomioka | Men's teams 9 | Austria (AUT); L 0–3 | United States (USA); L 2–3 | —N/a | 3 | Did not advance | | | |

==== Women ====
| Athlete | Event | Preliminaries | | | | Quarterfinals | Semifinals | Final / BM | |
| Athlete | Event | Opposition Result | Opposition Result | Opposition Result | Rank | Opposition Result | Opposition Result | Opposition Result | Rank |
|---|---|---|---|---|---|---|---|---|---|
| Kimie Bessho | Women's singles 5 | Pivarciova (CZE); L 1–3 | Hoffmann (MEX); L 2–3 | Gu G (CHN); W 3–1 | 3 | Did not advance | | | |
| Satoko Fujiwara | Women's singles 3 | Pintar (SLO); L 0–3 | Moll (RSA); W 3–0 | —N/a | 2 Q | Mariage (FRA); L 3–2 | Did not advance | | |
| Tomoko Fukuzawa | Women's singles 3 | Mariage (FRA); L 0–3 | Paardekam (NED); W 3–0 | M Y Silva (CUB); W 3–1 | 2 Q | Gay (FRA); L 0–3 | Did not advance | | |
| Yasuko Kudo | Women's singles 10 | Partyka (POL); L 0–3 | Zakova (CZE); W 3–0 | le Morvan (FRA); W 3–1 | 2 Q | —N/a | Matouskova (CZE); L 2–3 | Lu Y Q (CHN); L 2–3 | 4 |
| Satoko Fujiwara; Tomoko Fukuzawa | Women's teams 1-3 | No preliminaries | | | | —N/a | Great Britain (GBR); W 3–1 | France (FRA); L 1–3 | 2nd place, silver medalist(s) |

=== Volleyball ===
The men's volleyball team didn't win any medals: they were 7th out 8 teams.

==== Players ====
- Satoshi Kanao
- Masahiko Kato
- Yosuke Kurita
- Kaname Nakayama
- Yoshihito Takeda
- Tadashi Tamura
- Tsutomu Tanabe
- Koji Tanaka
- Koki Todo
- Arata Yamamoto
- Atsushi Yonezawa
- Hitoshi Yoshida

==== Results ====
No eliminations occur in the preliminaries for ranking purposes

| Game | Match | Score | Rank |
| 1 | Japan vs. Iran (IRI) | 0 – 3 | 8 |
| 2 | Japan vs. Germany (GER) | 0 – 3 | 8 |
| 3 | Japan vs. Finland (FIN) | 0 – 3 | 8 |
| Quarterfinals | Japan vs. Bosnia and Herzegovina (BIH) | 0 – 3 | L |
| Semifinals | Japan vs. United States (USA) | 2 – 3 | L |
| 7th-8th classification | Japan vs. Greece (GRE) | 3 – 1 | 7 |

=== Wheelchair basketball ===
==== Men's team ====
The men's basketball team didn't win any medals: they were 8th out of 12 teams.

==== Players ====
- Shingo Fujii
- Reo Fujimoto
- Yasuyuki Hasegawa
- Yasuhiro Jimbo
- Keisuke Koretomo
- Kazuyuki Kyoya
- Katsumi Miyake
- Noriyuki Mori
- Tomohiko Oshima
- Takao Sugasawa
- Hisanobu Sugiura
- Naoki Yasu

==== Results ====
| Game | Match | Score | Rank |
| 1 | Japan vs. Netherlands (NED) | 47 – 76 | 4 Q |
| 2 | Japan vs. United States (USA) | 46 – 54 | 4 Q |
| 3 | Japan vs. Germany (GER) | 58 – 79 | 4 Q |
| 4 | Japan vs. Iran (IRI) | 79 – 57 | 4 Q |
| 5 | Japan vs. Greece (GRE) | 73 – 32 | 4 Q |
| Quarterfinals | Japan vs. Canada (CAN) | 48 – 50 | L |
| 7th-8th classification | Japan vs. United States (USA) | 56 – 79 | 8 |

==== Women's team ====
The women's basketball team didn't win any medals: they were 5th out of 8 teams.

==== Players ====
- Sachiko Goto
- Yasuko Hatano
- Rie Kawakami
- Megumi Mashiko
- Sachiko Minamikawa
- Junko Sako
- Tomoe Soeda
- Naoko Sugahara
- Mika Takabayashi
- Kyoko Tsukamoto
- Chika Uemara
- Erika Yoshida

==== Results ====
| Game | Match | Score | Rank |
| 1 | Japan vs. Canada (CAN) | 28 – 51 | 3 Q |
| 2 | Japan vs. Germany (GER) | 36 – 50 | 3 Q |
| 3 | Japan vs. Mexico (MEX) | 45 – 29 | 3 Q |
| Quarterfinals | Japan vs. United States (USA) | 33 – 70 | L |
| Semifinals | Japan vs. Netherlands (NED) | 54 – 52 | W |
| 5th-6th classification | Japan vs. Mexico (MEX) | 53 – 47 | 5 |

=== Wheelchair fencing ===
==== Men ====
| Athlete | Event | Qualification | | | Round of 16 | Quarterfinal | Semifinal | Final / BM | |
| Athlete | Event | Opposition | Score | Rank | Opposition Score | Opposition Score | Opposition Score | Opposition Score | Rank |
|---|---|---|---|---|---|---|---|---|---|
| Toyoaki Hisakawa | Men's épée B | Chung (HKG) | L 0–5 | 5 Q | Komar (UKR); L 9–15 | Did not advance | | | |
| Toyoaki Hisakawa | Men's épée B | Komar (UKR) | L 2–5 | 5 Q | Komar (UKR); L 9–15 | Did not advance | | | |
| Toyoaki Hisakawa | Men's épée B | Park (KOR) | W 5–3 | 5 Q | Komar (UKR); L 9–15 | Did not advance | | | |
| Toyoaki Hisakawa | Men's épée B | Sarri (ITA) | L 3–5 | 5 Q | Komar (UKR); L 9–15 | Did not advance | | | |
| Toyoaki Hisakawa | Men's épée B | Soler (ESP) | W 5–3 | 5 Q | Komar (UKR); L 9–15 | Did not advance | | | |
| Toyoaki Hisakawa | Men's foil B | Hui (HKG) | L 1–5 | 5 | Did not advance | | | | |
| Toyoaki Hisakawa | Men's foil B | Rodgers (USA) | L 3–5 | 5 | Did not advance | | | | |
| Toyoaki Hisakawa | Men's foil B | Shenkevych (UKR) | L 1–5 | 5 | Did not advance | | | | |
| Toyoaki Hisakawa | Men's foil B | Lewonowski (POL) | L 1–5 | 5 | Did not advance | | | | |

==== Women ====
| Athlete | Event | Qualification | | | Round of 16 | Quarterfinal | Semifinal | Final / BM | |
| Athlete | Event | Opposition | Score | Rank | Opposition Score | Opposition Score | Opposition Score | Opposition Score | Rank |
|---|---|---|---|---|---|---|---|---|---|
| Tomoko Tani | Women's épée A | Krajnyak (HUN) | L 2–5 | 6 | Did not advance | | | | |
| Tomoko Tani | Women's épée A | Polasik (POL) | W 5–3 | 6 | Did not advance | | | | |
| Tomoko Tani | Women's épée A | Assmann (FRA) | L 1–5 | 6 | Did not advance | | | | |
| Tomoko Tani | Women's épée A | Presutto (ITA) | L 0–5 | 6 | Did not advance | | | | |
| Tomoko Tani | Women's épée A | Gilmore (USA) | L 4–5 | 6 | Did not advance | | | | |
| Tomoko Tani | Women's foil A | Fan (HKG) | L 0–5 | 6 | Did not advance | | | | |
| Tomoko Tani | Women's foil A | Picot (FRA) | L 1–5 | 6 | Did not advance | | | | |
| Tomoko Tani | Women's foil A | Rossek (GER) | L 2–5 | 6 | Did not advance | | | | |
| Tomoko Tani | Women's foil A | Frelik (POL) | L 1–5 | 6 | Did not advance | | | | |
| Tomoko Tani | Women's foil A | Gilmore (USA) | W 5–1 | 6 | Did not advance | | | | |

=== Wheelchair rugby ===
The men's rugby team didn't win any medals: they were 8th out of 8 teams.

==== Players ====
- Masahiro Fukui
- Satoshi Ito
- Masanao Kawamura
- Hiroyuki Misaka
- Kenichi Mori
- Takuo Murohashi
- Shinichi Nakazato
- Koichi Ogino
- Yoshito Sato
- Shinichi Shimakawa
- Yoshinobu Takahashi
- Manabu Tamura

==== Results ====
| Game | Match | Score | Rank |
| 1 | Japan vs. United States (USA) | 39 – 54 | 4 Q |
| 2 | Japan vs. Australia (AUS) | 47 – 48 | 4 Q |
| 3 | Japan vs. New Zealand (NZL) | 35 – 47 | 4 Q |
| Quarterfinals | Japan vs. Great Britain (GBR) | 42 – 50 | L |
| Semifinals | Japan vs. Belgium (BEL) | 35 – 36 | L |
| 7th-8th classification | Japan vs. Germany (GER) | 40 – 41 | 8 |

=== Wheelchair tennis ===
==== Men ====
| Athlete | Class | Event | Round of 64 | Round of 32 | Round of 16 | Quarterfinals | Semifinals | Finals |
| Athlete | Class | Event | Opposition Result | Opposition Result | Opposition Result | Opposition Result | Opposition Result | Opposition Result |
|---|---|---|---|---|---|---|---|---|
| Shingo Kunieda | Open | Men's singles | Onasie (INA); W 6–0, 6–0 | Kulik (POL); W 6–0, 6–2 | Wikstrom (SWE); W 6–3, 4–6, 6–3 | Hall (AUS); L 2–6, 6–0, 4–6 | Did not advance | |
| Hidekazu Nakano | Open | Men's singles | Stuurman (NED); L 3–6, 1–6 | Did not advance | | | | |
| Satoshi Saida | Open | Men's singles | Batycki (POL); W 6–0, 6–0 | Gatelli (ITA); W 6–0, 6–2 | Mistry (GBR); W 6–2, 6–1 | Ammerlaan (NED); L 4–6, 6–3, 6–7 | Did not advance | |
| Ryoichi To | Open | Men's singles | Welch (USA); L 1–6, 0–6 | Did not advance | | | | |
| Shingo Kunieda; Satoshi Saida | Open | Men's doubles | —N/a | Bye | Batycki (POL) / Kulik (POL); W 6–0, 6–0 | Hatt (GBR) / Mistry (GBR); W 6–1, 6–1 | Bonaccurso (AUS) / Hall (AUS); W 4–6, 6–4, 7–6 | Jeremiasz (FRA) / Majdi (FRA); W 6–1, 6–2 (gold) |
| Hidekazu Nakano; Ryoichi To | Open | Men's doubles | —N/a | Gatelli (ITA) / Mazzei (ITA); L 6–7, 7–6, 3–6 | Did not advance | | | |

==== Women ====
| Athlete | Class | Event | Round of 32 | Round of 16 | Quarterfinals | Semifinals | Finals |
| Athlete | Class | Event | Opposition Result | Opposition Result | Opposition Result | Opposition Result | Opposition Result |
|---|---|---|---|---|---|---|---|
| Chiyoko Ohmae | Open | Women's singles | Ochoa (ESP); W 6–2, 6–1 | Peters (NED); L 3–6, 2–6 | Did not advance | | |
| Mie Yaosa | Open | Women's singles | Gravellier (FRA); L 1–6, 2–6 | Did not advance | | | |
| Chiyoko Ohmae; Mie Yaosa | Open | Women's doubles | —N/a | Bye | Clark (USA) / Verfuerth (USA); W 7–5, 6–3 | Smit (NED) / Vergeer (NED); L 2–6, 0–6 | Erath (SUI) / Kalt (SUI); L 5–7, 3–6 |

==== Quads ====
| Athlete | Class | Event | Round of 16 | Quarterfinals | Semifinals | Finals |
| Athlete | Class | Event | Opposition Result | Opposition Result | Opposition Result | Opposition Result |
|---|---|---|---|---|---|---|
| Masao Takashima | Open | Quads' singles | Weinberg (ISR); L 2–6, 3–6 | Did not advance | | |
| Hiroshi Toma | Open | Quads' singles | Hunter (CAN); L 1–6, 2–6 | Did not advance | | |
| Masao Takashima; Hiroshi Toma | Open | Quads' doubles | —N/a | Hunter (CAN) / McPhate (CAN); L 3–6, 0–6 | Did not advance | |

== See also ==
- Japan at the Paralympics
- Japan at the 2004 Summer Olympics
