= Archery at the Summer Paralympics =

- Governing body: WA
- Events: 9 (men: 5; women: 4)

Games
- 1960; 1964; 1968; 1972; 1976; 1980; 1984; 1988; 1992; 1996; 2000; 2004; 2008; 2012; 2016; 2020; 2024
- Medalists

Para-archery has been contested at every Summer Paralympic Games since they were first held in 1960. Separate individual and team events are held for men and women. Archers are classified according to the extent of their disability, with separate individual events for each of three classes.

- W1 - Wheelchair and Cerebral Palsy athletes with impairment in all four limbs.
- W2 - Wheelchair users with full arm function.
- W3 - Standing athletes in Amputee, Les Autres and Cerebral Palsy categories. Some athletes in the standing group will sit on a high stool for support but will still have their feet touching the ground.

== Summary ==
| Games | Year | Events | Best Nation |
|---|---|---|---|
| 1 | 1960 | 8 | United States |
| 2 | 1964 | 12 | United States |
| 3 | 1968 | 13 | United States |
| 4 | 1972 | 12 | West Germany |
| 5 | 1976 | 18 | France |
| 6 | 1980 | 15 | West Germany |
| 7 | 1984 | 18 | France |
| 8 | 1988 | 9 | South Korea |
| 9 | 1992 | 7 | Italy |
| 10 | 1996 | 8 | Poland |
| 11 | 2000 | 7 | Italy |
| 12 | 2004 | 7 | Great Britain |
| 13 | 2008 | 9 | China |
| 14 | 2012 | 9 | Russia |
| 15 | 2016 | 9 | Great Britain |
| 16 | 2020 | 9 | China |
| 17 | 2024 | 9 | China |

== Medal summary ==
Overall results, updated to the 2024 Summer Paralympics.

| Rank | Nation | Gold | Silver | Bronze | Total |
|---|---|---|---|---|---|
| 1 | United States (USA) | 22 | 8 | 17 | 47 |
| 2 | Great Britain (GBR) | 19 | 22 | 23 | 64 |
| 3 | France (FRA) | 15 | 12 | 11 | 38 |
| 4 | South Korea (KOR) | 15 | 10 | 13 | 38 |
| 5 | West Germany (FRG) | 15 | 9 | 10 | 34 |
| 6 | China (CHN) | 14 | 10 | 9 | 33 |
| 7 | Italy (ITA) | 9 | 12 | 13 | 34 |
| 8 | Iran (IRI) | 6 | 5 | 4 | 15 |
| 9 | South Africa (RSA) | 6 | 4 | 1 | 11 |
| 10 | Japan (JPN) | 5 | 12 | 9 | 26 |
| 11 | Sweden (SWE) | 5 | 5 | 3 | 13 |
| 12 | Belgium (BEL) | 4 | 6 | 2 | 12 |
| 13 | Finland (FIN) | 4 | 5 | 3 | 12 |
| 14 | Rhodesia (RHO) | 4 | 0 | 0 | 4 |
| 15 | Australia (AUS) | 3 | 9 | 5 | 17 |
| 16 | Czech Republic (CZE) | 3 | 7 | 4 | 14 |
| 17 | Norway (NOR) | 3 | 3 | 3 | 9 |
| 18 | Austria (AUT) | 3 | 2 | 1 | 6 |
| 19 | Canada (CAN) | 3 | 0 | 2 | 5 |
| 20 | Netherlands (NED) | 2 | 9 | 3 | 14 |
| 21 | Poland (POL) | 2 | 5 | 3 | 10 |
| 22 | Switzerland (SUI) | 2 | 3 | 4 | 9 |
| 23 | Turkey (TUR) | 2 | 3 | 2 | 7 |
| 24 | Germany (GER) | 2 | 1 | 3 | 6 |
| 25 | Russia (RUS) | 2 | 1 | 2 | 5 |
| 26 | Denmark (DEN) | 2 | 0 | 2 | 4 |
| 27 | Ireland (IRL) | 1 | 1 | 0 | 2 |
| 27 | New Zealand (NZL) | 1 | 1 | 0 | 2 |
| 29 | Slovakia (SVK) | 1 | 0 | 3 | 4 |
| 30 | India (IND) | 1 | 0 | 2 | 3 |
| 30 | RPC (RPC) | 1 | 0 | 2 | 3 |
| 32 | Mexico (MEX) | 1 | 0 | 0 | 1 |
| 32 | Mongolia (MGL) | 1 | 0 | 0 | 1 |
| 32 | Unified Team (EUN) | 1 | 0 | 0 | 1 |
| 35 | Spain (ESP) | 0 | 3 | 0 | 3 |
| 35 | Thailand (THA) | 0 | 3 | 0 | 3 |
| 37 | Chile (CHI) | 0 | 1 | 0 | 1 |
| 37 | Malaysia (MAS) | 0 | 1 | 0 | 1 |
| 37 | Ukraine (UKR) | 0 | 1 | 0 | 1 |
| 40 | Chinese Taipei (TPE) | 0 | 0 | 2 | 2 |
| 41 | Slovenia (SLO) | 0 | 0 | 1 | 1 |
| Totals (41 entries) | | 180 | 174 | 162 | 516 |

== Multi medalists ==
List of archers who have won at least two gold medals or five medals in archery. Active archers are in bold.

| Athlete | No. | Country | Years | Games | Gender | Gold | Silver | Bronze | Total |
|---|---|---|---|---|---|---|---|---|---|
| Paola Fantato | 1 | Italy (ITA) | 1988–2004 | 5 | F | 5 | 1 | 2 | 8 |
| Margaret Harriman | 2 | Rhodesia (RHO) | 1960–1964 | 2 | F | 4 | 0 | 0 | 4 |
| **Zahra Nemati** | 3 | Iran (IRI) | 2012–2020 | 3 | F | 3 | 1 | 1 | 5 |
| Anita Chapman | 3 | Great Britain (GBR) | 1996–2004 | 3 | F | 2 | 2 | 1 | 5 |
| Lee Hwa-sook | 5 | South Korea (KOR) | 2008–2012 | 2 | F | 2 | 1 | 0 | 3 |
| Oscar De Pellegrin | 6 | Italy (ITA) | 2000–2012 | 4 | M | 2 | 0 | 2 | 4 |
| Danielle Brown | 7 | Great Britain (GBR) | 2008–2012 | 2 | F | 2 | 0 | 0 | 2 |

== Nations ==
| Event | 60 | 64 | 68 | 72 | 76 | 80 | 84 | 88 | 92 | 96 | 00 | 04 | 08 | 12 | 16 | 20 | 24 | Total |
|---|---|---|---|---|---|---|---|---|---|---|---|---|---|---|---|---|---|---|
| Armenia (ARM) | | | | | | | | | | | | 1 | | | | | | 1 |
| Australia (AUS) | 2 | 4 | 8 | 10 | 7 | 4 | 6 | 3 | 2 | | 4 | 1 | | | 1 | | | 12 |
| Austria (AUT) | | | | 1 | | 5 | 6 | 2 | | | 1 | | | | | | | 5 |
| Azerbaijan (AZE) | | | | | | | | | | | | | | 1 | 1 | | | 2 |
| Belarus (BLR) | | | | | | | | | | 2 | | 1 | | | | | | 2 |
| Belgium (BEL) | 2 | 1 | 8 | 4 | 7 | 7 | 5 | 6 | 1 | 1 | | | | | | | | 10 |
| Brazil (BRA) | | | | 1 | | | | | | | | | | | 8 | | | 2 |
| Canada (CAN) | | | 1 | 6 | 9 | 3 | 4 | 1 | 2 | 1 | 2 | 1 | 3 | 5 | 2 | | | 13 |
| China (CHN) | | | | | | | | | | | | 2 | 11 | 7 | 12 | | | 4 |
| Chinese Taipei (TPE) | | | | | | | | | | | | 1 | 2 | 3 | 2 | | | 4 |
| Colombia (COL) | | | | | | | | 1 | 1 | | | | | | 1 | | | 3 |
| Cyprus (CYP) | | | | | | | | 2 | | | | 1 | | | | | | 2 |
| Czech Republic (CZE) | | | | | | | | | | | 3 | 4 | 6 | 8 | 5 | | | 5 |
| Denmark (DEN) | | | 1 | 5 | 2 | 2 | 1 | 1 | 3 | 2 | 1 | | | | | | | 9 |
| Egypt (EGY) | | | | | 2 | | | | | | | | | | | | | 1 |
| Finland (FIN) | | | | 3 | 7 | 7 | 7 | 11 | 9 | 3 | 3 | 1 | 3 | 5 | 2 | | | 12 |
| France (FRA) | 3 | 6 | 12 | 12 | 7 | 9 | 15 | 4 | 3 | 4 | 7 | 4 | 6 | 5 | 5 | | | 15 |
| Georgia (GEO) | | | | | | | | | | | | | | | 1 | | | 1 |
| Germany (GER) | 1 | | | | | | | | 10 | 8 | 7 | 4 | 5 | 4 | 4 | | | 8 |
| Great Britain (GBR) | 7 | 4 | 15 | 15 | 13 | 7 | 15 | 13 | 10 | 7 | 7 | 8 | 12 | 13 | 11 | | | 15 |
| Greece (GRE) | | | | | | | | | 1 | | | 2 | 2 | 1 | 1 | | | 5 |
| Guatemala (GUA) | | | | | 2 | | | | | | | | | | | | | 1 |
| Hong Kong (HKG) | | | | 3 | 1 | | 1 | 5 | 1 | 1 | 3 | | | | 1 | | | 8 |
| Hungary (HUN) | | | | 1 | | | 3 | | 1 | | | | | | | | | 3 |
| Iceland (ISL) | | | | | | | | | | | | | | | 1 | | | 1 |
| India (IND) | | | 4 | 1 | | | | | | | | | | | 1 | | | 3 |
| Indonesia (INA) | | | | | 1 | | | | | | | | | | | | | 1 |
| Iran (IRI) | | | | | | | | | | | 3 | 3 | | 6 | 7 | | | 4 |
| Iraq (IRQ) | | | | | | | | | | | | | | | 2 | | | 1 |
| Ireland (IRL) | 1 | | 1 | 4 | 1 | | 1 | | 2 | 1 | | | 1 | | | | | 8 |
| Israel (ISR) | | | 4 | 2 | | | | | 2 | | | 1 | 1 | | | | | 5 |
| Italy (ITA) | | 1 | 4 | 4 | 3 | 2 | 7 | 7 | 7 | 9 | 7 | 7 | 7 | 10 | 9 | | | 14 |
| Jamaica (JAM) | | | 6 | 2 | | | | | | | | | | | | | | 2 |
| Japan (JPN) | | 4 | | 11 | 5 | 5 | 4 | 10 | 8 | 9 | 8 | 7 | 10 | 3 | 3 | | | 13 |
| Kazakhstan (KAZ) | | | | | | | | | | | | | | | 1 | | | 1 |
| Kenya (KEN) | | | | 1 | | | | | | | | | | | | | | 1 |
| Latvia (LAT) | | | | | | | | | | | | | | | 2 | | | 1 |
| Luxembourg (LUX) | | | | | 2 | 1 | 1 | | 1 | 1 | | | | | | | | 5 |
| Malaysia (MAS) | | | | | | | | | | | | 2 | 2 | 3 | 2 | | | 4 |
| Malta (MLT) | | | 1 | | | | | | | | | | | | | | | 1 |
| Mexico (MEX) | | | | | 2 | 1 | 3 | | 1 | | | 1 | | 1 | | | | 6 |
| Mongolia (MGL) | | | | | | | | | | | 1 | 1 | 2 | 2 | 3 | | | 5 |
| Netherlands (NED) | | 1 | 5 | 7 | 8 | 9 | 4 | 1 | | 1 | 2 | | 1 | 1 | | | | 11 |
| New Zealand (NZL) | | | 5 | 1 | 3 | 5 | 1 | 1 | | | 1 | | | | | | | 7 |
| Norway (NOR) | | | 6 | 8 | 11 | 9 | 5 | | 2 | 1 | | | 1 | 1 | 1 | | | 10 |
| Poland (POL) | | | | | | 2 | | | | 4 | 6 | 8 | 7 | 5 | 3 | | | 7 |
| Puerto Rico (PUR) | | | | | | | | 4 | 1 | | | | | | 1 | | | 3 |
| Rhodesia (RHO) | 1 | 1 | 3 | | | | | | | | | | | | | | | 3 |
| Russia (RUS) | | | | | | | | | | | | | 1 | 8 | | | | 2 |
| Singapore (SGP) | | | | | | | | | | | | | | | 2 | | | 1 |
| Slovakia (SVK) | | | | | | | | | | | 4 | 4 | 3 | 4 | 2 | | | 5 |
| South Africa (RSA) | | 3 | 3 | 5 | 8 | | | | | 1 | | | | | 1 | | | 6 |
| South Korea (KOR) | | | 3 | 5 | 2 | | | | 6 | 7 | 7 | 9 | 13 | 9 | 10 | | | 10 |
| Spain (ESP) | | | 3 | | 1 | 1 | 2 | 1 | 3 | 5 | 3 | 3 | 4 | 3 | 4 | | | 12 |
| Sri Lanka (SRI) | | | | | | | | | | | | 1 | | | 1 | | | 2 |
| Sweden (SWE) | | 1 | 9 | 5 | 4 | 6 | 11 | 7 | 5 | 3 | 2 | 1 | 4 | 2 | 1 | | | 14 |
| Switzerland (SUI) | | 1 | 11 | 6 | 6 | 3 | 3 | 2 | 1 | 2 | 2 | 1 | 3 | 2 | 2 | | | 14 |
| Thailand (THA) | | | | | | | | | | | 4 | 4 | 3 | 2 | 3 | | | 5 |
| Turkey (TUR) | | | | | | | | | | | | | 5 | 11 | 8 | | | 3 |
| Ukraine (UKR) | | | | | | | | | | 2 | 5 | 6 | 8 | 7 | 3 | | | 6 |
| Unified Team (EUN) | | | | | | | | | 4 | | | | | | | | | 1 |
| United States (USA) | 2 | 14 | 21 | 11 | 13 | 7 | 6 | 7 | 7 | 3 | 3 | 5 | 8 | 7 | 8 | | | 15 |
| Venezuela (VEN) | | | | | | | | | | | | 1 | | | | | | 1 |
| West Germany (FRG) | | | 14 | 16 | 14 | 13 | 10 | 11 | | | | | | | | | | 6 |
| Zimbabwe (ZIM) | | | | | | 1 | | | | | | | | | | | | 1 |
| Nations | 8 | 12 | 24 | 27 | 26 | 23 | 24 | 22 | 26 | 23 | 25 | 31 | 28 | 29 | 40 | | | |
| Competitors | 19 | 41 | 154 | 150 | 141 | 111 | 126 | 110 | 94 | 78 | 96 | 96 | 134 | 139 | 137 | | | |
| Year | 60 | 64 | 68 | 72 | 76 | 80 | 84 | 88 | 92 | 96 | 00 | 04 | 08 | 12 | 16 | 20 | | |

== See also ==
- Archery at the Summer Olympics
