= Archery at the 2000 Summer Paralympics – Women's individual W1/W2 =

Archery at the XI Paralympic Games
- Venue: Sydney, Australia
- Dates: 20 to 25 October
- Competitors: 14 from 9 nations

Medalists
1st place, gold medalist(s)		Paola Fantato	Italy
2nd place, silver medalist(s)		Kathleen Smith	Great Britain
3rd place, bronze medalist(s)		Ko Hee-sook	South Korea

The women's individual W1/W2 archery competition at the 2000 Summer Paralympics was held from 20 to 25 October 2000 in Sydney, Australia.

== Results ==
=== Ranking round ===
Rank	Competitor	Points
1	Paola Fantato (ITA)	593
2	Ko Hee-sook (KOR)	585
3	Sandra Truccolo (ITA)	546
4	Hifumi Suzuki (JPN)	541
5	Martine Heule (SUI)	531
6	Kathleen Smith (GBR)	530
7	Neroli Fairhall (NZL)	521
8	Anna Menconi (ITA)	520
9	Hitomi Matsuoka (JPN)	504
10	Miroslava Cerna (CZE)	496
11	Maria Droste (GER)	455
12	Caroline Ott (GER)	445
13	Tanja Schultz (GER)	397
14	Monthong Kawkumfull (THA)	356

=== Competition bracket ===
Round of 16
Hitomi Matsuoka (JPN)	131
Anna Menconi (ITA)	120
Martine Heule (SUI)	131
Caroline Ott (GER)	96
Tanja Schultz (GER)	111
Hifumi Suzuki (JPN)	114
Sandra Truccolo (ITA)	137
Monthong Kawkumfull (THA)	95
Maria Droste (GER)	100
Kathleen Smith (CZE)	143
Neroli Fairhall (NZL)	134
Miroslava Cerna (CZE)	135

Quarterfinals
Paola Fantato (ITA)	97
Hitomi Matsuoka (JPN)	85
Martine Heule (SUI)	73
Hifumi Suzuki (JPN)	93
Sandra Truccolo (ITA)	74
Kathleen Smith (GBR)	90
Miroslava Cerna (CZE)	79
Ko Hee-sook (KOR)	103

Semifinals
Paola Fantato (ITA)	102
Hifumi Suzuki (JPN)	89
Kathleen Smith (GBR)	96
Ko Hee-sook (KOR)	91

Final
Paola Fantato (ITA)	101
Kathleen Smith (GBR)	96
Third place
Hifumi Suzuki (JPN)	80
Ko Hee-sook (KOR)	96
