= Italy at the 2004 Summer Paralympics =

- IPC code: ITA
- NPC: Comitato Italiano Paralimpico
- Website: www.comitatoparalimpico.it (in Italian)

in Athens
- Competitors: 77 in 12 sports
- Medals Ranked 31st: Gold 4 Silver 8 Bronze 7 Total 19

Summer Paralympics appearances (overview)
- 1960; 1964; 1968; 1972; 1976; 1980; 1984; 1988; 1992; 1996; 2000; 2004; 2008; 2012; 2016; 2020; 2024

Italy competed at the 2004 Summer Paralympics in Athens, Greece. The team included 76 athletes, 62 men and 14 women. Competitors from Italy won 19 medals, including 4 gold, 8 silver and 7 bronze to finish 31st in the medal table.

== Medalists ==
Medal	Athlete	Sport	Event
Gold	Paola Fantato	Archery	Women's individual W1/W2
Gold	Alvise De Vidi	Athletics	Men's marathon T51
Gold	Immacolata Cerasuolo	Swimming	Women's 100 m butterfly S8
Gold	Alberto Pellegrini	Wheelchair fencing	Men's individual sabre A
Silver	Paola Fantato; Anna Menconi; Sandra Truccolo	Archery	Women's team
Silver	Stefano Lippi	Athletics	Men's long jump F42
Silver	Roberto La Barbera	Athletics	Men's long jump F44
Silver	Francesca Porcellato	Athletics	Women's 100 m T53
Silver	Francesca Porcellato	Athletics	Women's 800 m T53
Silver	Fabio Triboli	Cycling	Men's bicycle road race/time trial LC1
Silver	Immacolata Cerasuolo	Swimming	Women's 200 m individual medley SM8
Silver	Valeria Zorzetto	Table tennis	Women's singles class 4
Bronze	Alvise De Vidi	Athletics	Men's 200 m T51
Bronze	Andrea Cionna	Athletics	Women's 10000 m T11
Bronze	Andrea Cionna	Athletics	Women's marathon T11
Bronze	Francesca Porcellato	Athletics	Women's 400 m T53
Bronze	Fabio Triboli	Cycling	Men's individual 4 km pursuit LC1
Bronze	Fabrizio Macchi	Cycling	Men's individual 4 km pursuit LC3
Bronze	Carlo Piccoli	Swimming	Men's 200m freestyle S3

== Sports ==
=== Archery ===
==== Men ====
Athlete	Event	Ranking round		Round of 32	Round of 16	Quarterfinals	Semifinals	Finals	
Athlete	Event	Score	Seed	Opposition score	Opposition score	Opposition score	Opposition score	Opposition score	Rank
Daniele Cassiani	Men's individual W1	386	12	N/A	Cavanagh (GBR); L 114-164	did not advance			
Salvartore Carrubba	Men's individual W2	555	29	Tseng (TPE); L 126-155	did not advance				
Oscar de Pellegrin	Men's individual W2	626	2	Bye	Sakodo (JPN); W 151-147	Lee (KOR); W 94-91	Oehme (GER); L 97-98	Lee (KOR); L 96-104	4
Marco Vitale	Men's individual W2	568	24	Sawicki (POL); W 153-137	Zhang (CHN); L 139-158	did not advance			
Salvatore Carrubba; Oscar de Pellegrin; Marco Vitale	Men's team	1749	10	N/A	France (FRA); W *197-197	United States (USA); L 223-226	did not advance		

==== Women ====
Athlete	Event	Ranking round		Round of 32	Round of 16	Quarterfinals	Semifinals	Finals	
Athlete	Event	Score	Seed	Opposition score	Opposition score	Opposition score	Opposition score	Opposition score	Rank
Paola Fantato	Women's individual W1/2	570	4	N/A	Nakanishi (JPN); W 154-127	Cerna (CZE); W 85-80	Hirasawa (JPN); W 96-88	Isozaki (JPN); W 97-83	1st place, gold medalist(s)
Anna Menconi	Women's individual W1/2	514	14	N/A	Isozaki (JPN); L 128-129	did not advance			
Sandra Truccolo	Women's individual W1/2	533	12	N/A	Cerna (CZE); L 117-119	did not advance			
Paola Fantato; Anna Menconi; Sandra Truccolo	Women's team	1617	6	N/A		Czech Republic (CZE); W 201-176	South Korea (KOR); W 205-194	Great Britain (GBR); L 157-184	2nd place, silver medalist(s)

=== Athletics ===
==== Men's track ====
Athlete	Class	Event	Heats		Semifinal		Final	
Athlete	Class	Event	Result	Rank	Result	Rank	Result	Rank
Paolo Barbera	T13	800m	N/A				2:05.47	8
Paolo Barbera	T13	1500m	4:16.21	16	did not advance			
Daniele Bonacini	T44	100m	12.95	12	did not advance			
Daniele Bonacini	T44	200m	26.18	11	did not advance			
Alessio Carosi	T11	100m	12.27	17	did not advance			
Andrea Cionna	T11	10000m	N/A				33:59.98	3rd place, bronze medalist(s)
Andrea Cionna	T11	Marathon	N/A				2:49:59	3rd place, bronze medalist(s)
Fabrizio Cocchi	T13	Marathon	N/A				2:51:16	9
Paolo D'Agostini	T51	200m	N/A				43.77	7
Paolo D'Agostini	T51	Marathon	N/A				3:48:28	5
Alvise de Vidi	T51	200m	N/A				40.30	3rd place, bronze medalist(s)
Alvise de Vidi	T51	Marathon	N/A				2:53:38	1st place, gold medalist(s)
Carlo Durante	T11	10000m	N/A				37:46.96	12
Carlo Durante	T11	Marathon	N/A				3:05:01	7
Stefano Lippi	T42	100m	N/A				13.09	4
Stefano Lippi	T42	200m	N/A				28.10	6
Aldo Manganaro	T13	100m	11.32	7 q	N/A		11.39	7
Aldo Manganaro	T13	200m	23.30	8 Q	N/A		23.62	6
Heros Marai	T44	100m	12.27	6 q	N/A		12.12	6
Heros Marai	T44	200m	25.23	9	did not advance			
Lorenzo Ricci	T11	100m	DNF		did not advance			
Lorenzo Ricci	T11	200m	DNS		did not advance			
Matteo Tassetti	T12	100m	11.91	23	did not advance			
Matteo Tassetti	T12	200m	24.41	22	did not advance			
Daniele Bonacini; Roberto la Barbera; Stefano Lippi; Heros Marai	T42-46	4 × 100 m relay	N/A				DNF	

==== Men's field ====
Athlete	Class	Event	Final		
Athlete	Class	Event	Result	Points	Rank
Germano Bernardi	F54	Shot put	7.38	-	9
Daniele Bonacini	F44	Long jump	5.72	-	6
Roberto La Barbera	F44	Long jump	6.45	-	2nd place, silver medalist(s)
Roberto La Barbera	P44	Pentathlon	4127		4
Stefano Lippi	F42	Long jump	5.63	-	2nd place, silver medalist(s)
Renato Misturini	F55	Discus	29.40	-	7
Renato Misturini	F55-56	Javelin	22.51	770	16
Maurizio Nalin	F57	Javelin	29.30	-	7
Maurizio Nalin	F57	Shot put	11.95	-	5

==== Women's track ====
Athlete	Class	Event	Heats		Semifinal		Final	
Athlete	Class	Event	Result	Rank	Result	Rank	Result	Rank
Francesca Porcellato	T53	100m	N/A				17.63	2nd place, silver medalist(s)
Francesca Porcellato	T53	400m	57.46	2 Q	N/A		59.59	3rd place, bronze medalist(s)
Francesca Porcellato	T53	800m	2:07.67	5 Q	N/A		1:59.55	2nd place, silver medalist(s)

==== Women's field ====
Athlete	Class	Event	Final		
Athlete	Class	Event	Result	Points	Rank
Carmen Acunto	F54/55	Shot put	7.07	816	10
Giuliana Cum	F42-46	Discus	29.45	910	11
Giuliana Cum	F42-46	Shot put	8.43	786	14
Giuliana Cum	F44/46	Long jump	3.62	900	12

=== Cycling ===
==== Men's road ====
Athlete	Event	Time	Rank
Andreas Gemassmer	Men's road race / time trial LC3	-	4
Fabrizio Macchi	Men's road race / time trial LC3	-	8
Roland Reupp	Men's handcycle road race HC div B/C	1:27:31	8
Roland Reupp	Men's handcycle time trial HC div B/C	19:41.40	10
Pierangelo Vignati	Men's road race / time trial LC1	-	10
Fabio Triboli	Men's road race / time trial LC1	-	2nd place, silver medalist(s)
Emanuele Bersini; Fabrizio Di Somma	Men's road race / time trial tandem B1-3	3:08:23	11

==== Men's track ====
Athlete	Event	Qualification		1st round		Final	
Athlete	Event	Time	Rank	Time	Rank	Opposition Time	Rank
Fabrizio Macchi	Men's 1km time trial LC1-4	N/A				1:10.43	6
Fabrizio Macchi	Men's individual pursuit LC3	4:10.41	3 Q	Jesson (NZL); W 4:11.63	4 q	Garcia (ESP); W 4:07.43	3rd place, bronze medalist(s)
Fabio Triboli	Men's 1km time trial LC1-4	N/A				1:12.67	12
Fabio Triboli	Men's individual pursuit LC1	5:00.47	3 Q	Schambek (GER); W 5:01.71	3 q	Renggli (SUI); W 5:03.43	3rd place, bronze medalist(s)
Pierangelo Vignati	Men's 1km time trial LC1-4	N/A				1:16.22	24
Pierangelo Vignati	Men's individual pursuit LC1	5:04.18	4 Q	Renggli (SUI); L 5:15.00	7	did not advance	
Emanuele Bersini; Fabrizio Di Somma	Men's 1km time trial tandem B1-3	N/A				1:10.91	16
Emanuele Bersini; Fabrizio Di Somma	Men's individual pursuit tandem B1-3	4:43.45	11	did not advance			

=== Equestrian ===
Athlete	Event	Total	
Athlete	Event	Score	Rank
Mauro Caredda	Mixed individual championship test grade I	65.368	10
Mauro Caredda	Mixed individual freestyle test grade I	65.875	10

=== Judo ===
==== Men ====
Athlete	Event	Round of 16	Quarterfinals	Semifinals	Repechage round 1	Repechage round 2	Final/ Bronze medal contest
Athlete	Event	Opposition Result	Opposition Result	Opposition Result	Opposition Result	Opposition Result	Opposition Result
Diego Poli	Men's 81kg	Vincze (HUN); L 0000–0210	N/A		Pominov (UKR); L 0000-1010	did not advance	

=== Shooting ===
==== Men ====
Athlete	Event	Qualification		Final		
Athlete	Event	Score	Rank	Score	Total	Rank
Ivano Borgato	Men's 10m air pistol SH1	551	21	did not advance		
Ivano Borgato	Mixed 25m pistol SH1	538	20	did not advance		
Ivano Borgato	Mixed 50m pistol SH1	528	14	did not advance		
Daniele de Michiel	Men's 50m rifle 3 positions SH1	1114	14	did not advance		
Daniele de Michiel	Mixed 10m air rifle prone SH1	581	46	did not advance		
Daniele de Michiel	Mixed 50m rifle prone SH1	585	10	did not advance		
Giancarlo Iori	Men's 10m air pistol SH1	563	4 Q	93.9	656.9	6
Giancarlo Iori	Mixed 25m pistol SH1	549	13	did not advance		
Giancarlo Iori	Mixed 50m pistol SH1	515	14	did not advance		
Lauro Pederzoli	Mixed 10m air rifle prone SH1	596	22	did not advance		
Lauro Pederzoli	Mixed 50m rifle prone SH1	571	30	did not advance		

==== Women ====
Athlete	Event	Qualification		Final		
Athlete	Event	Score	Rank	Score	Total	Rank
Azzurra Ciani	Mixed 10m air rifle prone SH1	600 =WR	1 Q	102.9	702.9	6
Azzurra Ciani	Mixed 50m rifle prone SH1	582	13	did not advance		

=== Swimming ===
==== Men ====
Athlete	Class	Event	Heats		Final	
Athlete	Class	Event	Result	Rank	Result	Rank
Matteo Lenza	S8	50m freestyle	31.67	9	did not advance	
Matteo Lenza	S8	100m freestyle	1:07.82	14	did not advance	
Matteo Lenza	S8	400m freestyle	5:14.45	9	did not advance	
Luca Mazzone	S4	50m freestyle	43.17	6 Q	39.78	5
Luca Mazzone	S4	100m freestyle	1:39.05	7 Q	1:37.01	5
Luca Mazzone	S4	200m freestyle	3:31.03	7 Q	3:39.05	7
Luca Mazzone	S4	50m butterfly	1:11.93	9	did not advance	
Andrea Palantrani	S13	50m freestyle	27.39	10	did not advance	
Andrea Palantrani	S13	100m freestyle	1:01.95	12	did not advance	
Andrea Palantrani	S13	100m butterfly	1:12.70	11	did not advance	
Andrea Palantrani	SB13	100m breaststroke	1:14.33	1 Q	1:14.60	5
Andrea Palantrani	SM13	200m individual medley	2:40.37	9	did not advance	
Carlo Piccoli	S3	50m freestyle	53.13	4 Q	54.15	5
Carlo Piccoli	S3	100m freestyle	2:05.01	6 Q	1:57.22	4
Carlo Piccoli	S3	200m freestyle	4:15.09	4 Q	4:06.20	3rd place, bronze medalist(s)
Carlo Piccoli	SM3	150m individual medley	DSQ		did not advance	
Alessandro Serpico	S12	100m freestyle	1:01.87	11	did not advance	
Alessandro Serpico	S12	400m freestyle	4:54.83	8 Q	4:52.08	8
Alessandro Serpico	S12	100m backstroke	1:10.94	10	did not advance	
Alessandro Serpico	SB12	100m breaststroke	1:24.15	18	did not advance	

==== Women ====
Athlete	Class	Event	Heats		Final	
Athlete	Class	Event	Result	Rank	Result	Rank
Immacolata Cerasuolo	S8	100m freestyle	1:20.82	12	did not advance	
Immacolata Cerasuolo	S8	400m freestyle	6:09.17	12	did not advance	
Immacolata Cerasuolo	S8	100m butterfly	1:24.15	1 Q	1:23.04	1st place, gold medalist(s)
Immacolata Cerasuolo	SB8	100m breaststroke	1:36.40	8 Q	1:34.97	8
Immacolata Cerasuolo	SM8	200m individual medley	3:02.27	2 Q	3:02.03	2nd place, silver medalist(s)
Dalia Dameno	S5	50m freestyle	46.77	7 Q	45.71	7
Dalia Dameno	S5	100m freestyle	1:44.52	9	did not advance	
Dalia Dameno	S5	200m freestyle	3:53.22	8 Q	3:53.62	8
Dalia Dameno	S5	50m butterfly	N/A		1:04.08	7

=== Table tennis ===
==== Men ====
Athlete	Event	Preliminaries				Quarterfinals	Semifinals	Final / BM	
Athlete	Event	Opposition Result	Opposition Result	Opposition Result	Rank	Opposition Result	Opposition Result	Opposition Result	Rank
Salvatore Caci	Men's singles 4	Sutter (SUI); L 2–3	Benedetti (FRA); W 3–2	Eid (EGY); W 3–0	1 Q	Martin (FRA); L 1–3	did not advance		
Andrea Furlan	Men's singles 7	Morales (ESP); W 3-2	Duracka (CZE); W 3-0	Lima (BRA); W 3-0	1 Q	Meyer (GER); W 3-0	Wollmert (GER); L 1-3	Morales (ESP); L 0-3	4
Paolo Pietro Puglisi	Men's singles 10	Gaspar (SVK); L 0-3	Andersson (SWE); L 0-3	Bereczki (HUN); W 3-1	3	did not advance			

==== Women ====
Athlete	Event	Preliminaries				Quarterfinals	Semifinals	Final / BM	
Athlete	Event	Opposition Result	Opposition Result	Opposition Result	Rank	Opposition Result	Opposition Result	Opposition Result	Rank
Clara Podda	Women's singles 1-2	Marziou (FRA); L 1–3	Riding (GBR); W 3–1	Garcia Ble (MEX); W 3–0	2 Q	N/A	Clot (FRA); L 1–3	Mitton (GBR); L 0-3	4
Valeria Zorzetto	Women's singles 4	Dolinar (SLO); W 3-1	Arenales (MEX); W 3-1	Johnson (USA); W 3-0	1 Q	Bye	Pape (GER); W 3-2	Weinmann (GER); L 1-3	2nd place, silver medalist(s)

=== Wheelchair basketball ===
The men's wheelchair basketball team didn't win any medals; they were 6th out of 12 teams.

==== Players ====
- Damiano Airoldi
- Fabio Bernadis
- Matteo Cavagnini
- Salvatore Cherchi
- Sandr Cherubini
- Sergio Cherubini
- Alberto Pellegrini
- Mauro Pennino
- Fabio Raimondi
- Emiliano Rocca
- Stefano Rossetti
- Ali Mohamed Sanna

==== Tournament ====
Game	Match	Score	Rank
1	Italy vs. Canada (CAN)	54 - 83	4 Q
2	Italy vs. Australia (AUS)	52 - 57	4 Q
3	Italy vs. Great Britain (GBR)	51 - 48	4 Q
4	Italy vs. Brazil (BRA)	67 - 50	4 Q
5	Italy vs. France (FRA)	52 - 69	4 Q
Quarter finals	Italy vs. Netherlands (NED)	64 - 70	L
5th/6th classification	Italy vs. Germany (GER)	62 - 76	6

=== Wheelchair fencing ===
==== Men ====
Athlete	Event	Qualification			Round of 16	Quarterfinal	Semifinal	Final / BM	
Athlete	Event	Opposition	Score	Rank	Opposition Score	Opposition Score	Opposition Score	Opposition Score	Rank
Gerardo Mari	Men's foil B	Chung (HKG)	L 2-5	3 Q	Francois (FRA); W 15-14	Komar (UKR); L 10-15	did not advance		
Gerardo Mari	Men's foil B	Szekeres (HUN)	L 1-5	3 Q	Francois (FRA); W 15-14	Komar (UKR); L 10-15	did not advance		
Gerardo Mari	Men's foil B	Durand (FRA)	W 5-2	3 Q	Francois (FRA); W 15-14	Komar (UKR); L 10-15	did not advance		
Gerardo Mari	Men's foil B	Arnau (ESP)	W 5-0	3 Q	Francois (FRA); W 15-14	Komar (UKR); L 10-15	did not advance		
Gerardo Mari	Men's sabre B	Czop (POL)	W 5-2	2 Q	Bye	Szekeres (HUN); L 14-15	did not advance		
Gerardo Mari	Men's sabre B	Hui (HKG)	L 1-5	2 Q	Bye	Szekeres (HUN); L 14-15	did not advance		
Gerardo Mari	Men's sabre B	Park (KOR)	W 5-4	2 Q	Bye	Szekeres (HUN); L 14-15	did not advance		
Gerardo Mari	Men's sabre B	Arnau (ESP)	W 5-1	2 Q	Bye	Szekeres (HUN); L 14-15	did not advance		
Gerardo Mari	Men's sabre B	Moreno (USA)	W 5-4	2 Q	Bye	Szekeres (HUN); L 14-15	did not advance		
Alberto Pellegrini	Men's foil A	Zhang (CHN)	L 2-5	2 Q	Kwong (HKG); W 15-8	Zhang (CHN); L 10-15	did not advance		
Alberto Pellegrini	Men's foil A	Maillard (FRA)	W 5-3	2 Q	Kwong (HKG); W 15-8	Zhang (CHN); L 10-15	did not advance		
Alberto Pellegrini	Men's foil A	Almansouri (KUW)	W 5-0	2 Q	Kwong (HKG); W 15-8	Zhang (CHN); L 10-15	did not advance		
Alberto Pellegrini	Men's foil A	Rodriguez (ESP)	W 5-3	2 Q	Kwong (HKG); W 15-8	Zhang (CHN); L 10-15	did not advance		
Alberto Pellegrini	Men's sabre A	Fung (HKG)	W 5-2	1 Q	Bye	More (FRA); W 15-7	Jablonski (POL); W 15-12	Makowski (POL); W 15-12	1st place, gold medalist(s)
Alberto Pellegrini	Men's sabre A	Rodriguez (USA)	W 5-1	1 Q	Bye	More (FRA); W 15-7	Jablonski (POL); W 15-12	Makowski (POL); W 15-12	1st place, gold medalist(s)
Alberto Pellegrini	Men's sabre A	Lipinski (GER)	W 5-1	1 Q	Bye	More (FRA); W 15-7	Jablonski (POL); W 15-12	Makowski (POL); W 15-12	1st place, gold medalist(s)
Alberto Pellegrini	Men's sabre A	Sanchez (ESP)	W 5-1	1 Q	Bye	More (FRA); W 15-7	Jablonski (POL); W 15-12	Makowski (POL); W 15-12	1st place, gold medalist(s)
Alessio Sarri	Men's épée B	Chung (HKG)	L 1–5	4 Q	Shenkevych (UKR); L 5–15	did not advance			
Alessio Sarri	Men's épée B	Komar (UKR)	L 2-5	4 Q	Shenkevych (UKR); L 5–15	did not advance			
Alessio Sarri	Men's épée B	Park (KOR)	L 3-5	4 Q	Shenkevych (UKR); L 5–15	did not advance			
Alessio Sarri	Men's épée B	Hisakawa (JPN)	W 5-3	4 Q	Shenkevych (UKR); L 5–15	did not advance			
Alessio Sarri	Men's épée B	Soler (ESP)	W 5-4	4 Q	Shenkevych (UKR); L 5–15	did not advance			
Alessio Sarri	Men's foil B	Czop (POL)	L 2-5	4 Q	Chung (HKG); L 7-15	did not advance			
Alessio Sarri	Men's foil B	Latreche (FRA)	L 4-5	4 Q	Chung (HKG); L 7-15	did not advance			
Alessio Sarri	Men's foil B	Moreno (USA)	L 3-5	4 Q	Chung (HKG); L 7-15	did not advance			
Alessio Sarri	Men's foil B	Bogdos (GRE)	W 5-0	4 Q	Chung (HKG); L 7-15	did not advance			
Alberto Serafini	Men's foil A	Fung (HKG)	L 2-5	5	did not advance				
Alberto Serafini	Men's foil A	Al Qallaf (KUW)	L 3-5	5	did not advance				
Alberto Serafini	Men's foil A	Walisiewicz (POL)	L 3-5	5	did not advance				
Alberto Serafini	Men's foil A	El Assine (FRA)	L 3-5	5	did not advance				
Alberto Serafini	Men's foil A	Dulah (MAS)	W 5-2	5	did not advance				
Alberto Serafini	Men's sabre A	Jablonski (POL)	L 1-5	4 Q	Fung (HKG); L 2-15	did not advance			
Alberto Serafini	Men's sabre A	Tai (HKG)	L 0-5	4 Q	Fung (HKG); L 2-15	did not advance			
Alberto Serafini	Men's sabre A	More (FRA)	L 1-5	4 Q	Fung (HKG); L 2-15	did not advance			
Alberto Serafini	Men's sabre A	Ahner (GER)	W 5-2	4 Q	Fung (HKG); L 2-15	did not advance			
Alberto Serafini	Men's sabre A	Dulah (MAS)	W 5-2	4 Q	Fung (HKG); L 2-15	did not advance			

==== Women ====
Athlete	Event	Qualification			Round of 16	Quarterfinal	Semifinal	Final / BM	
Athlete	Event	Opposition	Score	Rank	Opposition Score	Opposition Score	Opposition Score	Opposition Score	Rank
Laura Presutto	Women's épée A	Krajnyak (HUN)	L 0–5	4 Q	Polasik (POL); L 6-15	did not advance			
Laura Presutto	Women's épée A	Polasik (POL)	L 1-5	4 Q	Polasik (POL); L 6-15	did not advance			
Laura Presutto	Women's épée A	Assmann (FRA)	L 2-5	4 Q	Polasik (POL); L 6-15	did not advance			
Laura Presutto	Women's épée A	Gilmore (USA)	W 5-3	4 Q	Polasik (POL); L 6-15	did not advance			
Laura Presutto	Women's épée A	Tani (JPN)	W 5-0	4 Q	Polasik (POL); L 6-15	did not advance			
Laura Presutto	Women's foil A	Yu (HKG)	L 2-5	5 Q	Picot (FRA); L 5-15	did not advance			
Laura Presutto	Women's foil A	Trigilia (ITA)	L 0-5	5 Q	Picot (FRA); L 5-15	did not advance			
Laura Presutto	Women's foil A	Witos (POL)	L 2-5	5 Q	Picot (FRA); L 5-15	did not advance			
Laura Presutto	Women's foil A	Assmann (FRA)	L 4-5	5 Q	Picot (FRA); L 5-15	did not advance			
Laura Presutto	Women's foil A	Jurak (HUN)	W 5-4	5 Q	Picot (FRA); L 5-15	did not advance			
Loredana Trigilia	Women's épée A	Yu (HKG)	W 5-2	1 Q	Gilmore (USA); W 15-13	Polasik (POL); W 15-12	Fan (HKG); L 9-15	Krajnyak (HUN); L 8-15	4
Loredana Trigilia	Women's épée A	Rossek (GER)	W 5-4	1 Q	Gilmore (USA); W 15-13	Polasik (POL); W 15-12	Fan (HKG); L 9-15	Krajnyak (HUN); L 8-15	4
Loredana Trigilia	Women's épée A	Jurak (HUN)	W 5-4	1 Q	Gilmore (USA); W 15-13	Polasik (POL); W 15-12	Fan (HKG); L 9-15	Krajnyak (HUN); L 8-15	4
Loredana Trigilia	Women's épée A	Meyer (FRA)	W 5-2	1 Q	Gilmore (USA); W 15-13	Polasik (POL); W 15-12	Fan (HKG); L 9-15	Krajnyak (HUN); L 8-15	4
Loredana Trigilia	Women's épée A	Frelik (POL)	W 5-1	1 Q	Gilmore (USA); W 15-13	Polasik (POL); W 15-12	Fan (HKG); L 9-15	Krajnyak (HUN); L 8-15	4
Loredana Trigilia	Women's foil A	Yu (HKG)	L 3-5	2 Q	Frelik (POL); W 15-4	Picot (FRA); L 14-15	did not advance		
Loredana Trigilia	Women's foil A	Witos (POL)	W 5-0	2 Q	Frelik (POL); W 15-4	Picot (FRA); L 14-15	did not advance		
Loredana Trigilia	Women's foil A	Assmann (FRA)	W 5-2	2 Q	Frelik (POL); W 15-4	Picot (FRA); L 14-15	did not advance		
Loredana Trigilia	Women's foil A	Presutto (ITA)	W 5-0	2 Q	Frelik (POL); W 15-4	Picot (FRA); L 14-15	did not advance		
Loredana Trigilia	Women's foil A	Jurak (HUN)	W 5-1	2 Q	Frelik (POL); W 15-4	Picot (FRA); L 14-15	did not advance		
Rosalba Vettraino	Women's épée B	Wyrzykowska (POL)	L 3-5	2 Q	N/A	Jana (THA); L 13-15	did not advance		
Rosalba Vettraino	Women's épée B	Lykyanenko (UKR)	W 5-2	2 Q	N/A	Jana (THA); L 13-15	did not advance		
Rosalba Vettraino	Women's épée B	Hassen Bey (ESP)	W 5-1	2 Q	N/A	Jana (THA); L 13-15	did not advance		
Rosalba Vettraino	Women's épée B	Masciotra (ARG)	W 5-0	2 Q	N/A	Jana (THA); L 13-15	did not advance		
Rosalba Vettraino	Women's foil B	Jana (THA)	L 2-5	5	did not advance				
Rosalba Vettraino	Women's foil B	Palfi (HUN)	L 1-5	5	did not advance				
Rosalba Vettraino	Women's foil B	Magnat (FRA)	L 1-5	5	did not advance				
Rosalba Vettraino	Women's foil B	Weber Kranz (GER)	L 4-5	5	did not advance				

==== Teams ====
Athlete	Event	Quarterfinal	Semifinal	Final / BM	
Athlete	Event	Opposition Score	Opposition Score	Opposition Score	Rank
Gerardo Mari; Alberto Pellegrini; Alessio Sarri; Alberto Serafini	Men's foil team	Kuwait (KUW); L 45-38	Spain (ESP); W 45-2	5th classification France (FRA); W 45-39	5
Gerardo Mari; Alberto Pellegrini; Alberto Serafini	Men's sabre team	United States (USA); W 45-25	Hong Kong (HKG); L 38-45	France (FRA); L 44-45	4
Laura Presutto; Loredana Trigilia; Rosalba Vettraino	Women's épée team	France (FRA); L 35-45	N/A	5th classification Germany (GER); L 43-45	6
Laura Presutto; Loredana Trigilia; Rosalba Vettraino	Women's foil team	France (FRA); L 41-45	United States (USA); W 45-19	5th classification Germany (GER); W 45-43	5

=== Wheelchair tennis ===
==== Men ====
Athlete	Class	Event	Round of 64	Round of 32	Round of 16	Quarterfinals	Semifinals	Finals
Athlete	Class	Event	Opposition Result	Opposition Result	Opposition Result	Opposition Result	Opposition Result	Opposition Result
Mario Gatelli	Open	Men's singles	Pellegrina (SUI); W 6–1, 7-5, 6–0	Saida (JPN); L 0–6, 2–6	did not advance			
Mario Gatelli; Fabian Mazzei	Open	Men's doubles	N/A	Nakano (JPN) / To (JPN); W 7-6, 6-7, 6-3	Jaroszewski (POL) / Kruszelnicki (POL); L 2-6, 2-6	did not advance		

==== Quads ====
Athlete	Class	Event	Round of 16	Quarterfinals	Semifinals	Finals
Athlete	Class	Event	Opposition Result	Opposition Result	Opposition Result	Opposition Result
Giuseppe Polidori	Open	Quads' singles	Eccleston (GBR); L 6–3, 3-6, 2-6	did not advance		
Antonio Raffaele	Open	Quads' singles	Wagner (USA); L 2-6, 1-6	did not advance		
Giuseppe Polidori; Antonio Raffaele	Open	Quads' doubles	N/A	de Beer (NED) / van Erp (NED); L 3-6, 1-6	did not advance	

== See also ==
- Italy at the Paralympics
- Italy at the 2004 Summer Olympics
