= Archery at the 2000 Summer Paralympics – Women's individual standing =

Archery Women's individual standing at the XI Paralympic Games
- Venue: Sydney, Australia
- Dates: 20 to 25 October 2000
- Competitors: 15 from 9 nations

Medalists
1st place, gold medalist(s)		Anita Chapman	Great Britain
2nd place, silver medalist(s)		Malgorzata Olejnik	Poland
3rd place, bronze medalist(s)		Malgorzata Korzeniowska	Poland

The women's individual standing archery event at the 2000 Summer Paralympics was held from 20 to 25 October 2000 in Sydney, Australia.

== Results ==
=== Ranking round ===
Rank	Competitor	Points
1	Masako Yonezawa (JPN)	569
2	Anita Chapman (GBR)	568
3	Olena Skubak (UKR)	564
4	Naomi Isozaki (JPN)	539
5	Malgorzata Korzeniowska (POL)	529
6	Jane White (GBR)	525
7	Siv Thulin (SWE)	524
8	Ratchanee Panmai (THA)	524
9	Malgorzata Olejnik (POL)	523
10	Natalie Cordowiner (AUS)	516
11	Birthe Morgensen (DEN)	509
12	Halyna Fedechko (UKR)	500
13	Wieslawa Staszalek (POL)	496
14	Olena Struk (UKR)	482
15	Marie-Françoise Hybois (FRA)	478

=== Competition bracket ===
Round of 16
Malgorzata Olejnik (POL)	141
Ratchanee Panmai (THA)	122
Malgorzata Korzeniowska (POL)	123
Halyna Fedechko (UKR)	91
Wieslawa Staszalek (POL)	135
Naomi Isozaki (JPN)	141
Olena Skubak (UKR)	122
Olena Struk (UKR)	119
Birthe Morgensen (DEN)	109
Jane White (GBR)	133
Siv Thulin (SWE)	115
Natalie Cordowiner (AUS)	128
Marie-François Hybois (FRA)	118
Anita Chapman (KOR)	130

Quarterfinals
Masako Yonezawa (JPN)	86 (7,7)
Malgorzata Olejnik (POL)	86 (7,8)
Malgorzata Korzeniowska (POL)	95
Naomi Isozaki (JPN)	90
Olena Skubak (UKR)	88
Jane White (GBR)	84
Natalie Cordowiner (AUS)	85
Anita Chapman (GBR)	89

Semifinals
Malgorzata Olejnik (POL)	92
Malgorzata Korzeniowska (POL)	76
Olena Skubak (UKR)	90
Anita Chapman (GBR)	100

Finals
Malgorzata Olejnik (POL)	79
Anita Chapman (GBR)	90
Third place
Malgorzata Korzeniowska (POL)	102
Olena Skubak (UKR)	96
