= Archery at the 1996 Summer Paralympics – Women's individual standing =

Women's individual standing at the X Paralympic Games
- Paralympic Archery
- Venue: Stone Mountain Park
- Dates: August 1996
- Competitors: 8 from 7 nations

Medalists
1st place, gold medalist(s)		Malgorzata Olejnik	Poland
2nd place, silver medalist(s)		Anita Chapman	Great Britain
3rd place, bronze medalist(s)		Marie-Francoise Hybois	France

The Women's Individual Standing was an archery competition in the 1996 Summer Paralympics.

The gold medal was won by Malgorzata Olejnik, wife of the men's champion Ryszard Olejnik. In the final she defeated Anita Chapman.

The bronze medal match was won by Marie-Francoise Hybois of France.

== Results ==
=== Qualifying round ===
Rank	Archer	Points
1	Kathleen Smith (GBR)	545
2	Birthe Morgensen (DEN)	518
3	Siv Thulin (SWE)	502
4	Malgorzata Olejnik (POL)	497
5	Tatiana Grichko (BLR)	494
6	Masako Yonezawa (JPN)	483
7	Anita Chapman (GBR)	474
8	Marie-Francoise Hybois (FRA)	352

=== Finals ===
Quarter-finals
8	Marie-Francoise Hybois (FRA)	98
1	Kathleen Smith (GBR)	89
5	Tatiana Grichko (BLR)	67
4	Malgorzata Olejnik (POL)	104
6	Masako Yonezawa (JPN)	92
3	Siv Thulin (SWE)	88
7	Anita Chapman (GBR)	92
2	Birthe Morgensen (DEN)	86

Semi-finals
8	Marie-Francoise Hybois (FRA)	90
4	Malgorzata Olejnik (POL)	95
6	Masako Yonezawa (JPN)	93
7	Anita Chapman (GBR)	97

Gold medal match
4	Malgorzata Olejnik (POL)	98
7	Anita Chapman (GBR)	85
Bronze medal match
8	Marie-Francoise Hybois (FRA)	90
6	Masako Yonezawa (JPN)	88
