= Archery at the 2004 Summer Paralympics – Women's individual W1/W2 =

Women's Individual W1/W2 at the XII Paralympic Games
- Paralympic Archery
- Venue: Olympic Baseball Centre (Athens)
- Dates: 21–25 September
- Competitors: 16 from 9 nations

Medalists
1st place, gold medalist(s)		Paola Fantato	Italy
2nd place, silver medalist(s)		Naomi Isozaki	Japan
3rd place, bronze medalist(s)		Nako Hirasawa	Japan

The Women's Individual W1/W2 archery competition at the 2004 Summer Paralympics was held from 21 to 25 September at the Olympic Baseball Centre (Athens).

The event was won by Paola Fantato, representing Italy.

== Results ==
=== Ranking Round ===
Rank	Competitor	Points	Notes
1	Nako Hirasawa (JPN)	613	WR
2	Ko Hee Sook (KOR)	601	
3	Naomi Isozaki (JPN)	593	
4	Paola Fantato (ITA)	570	
5	Miroslava Cerna (CZE)	552	
6	Marketa Sidkova (CZE)	550	
7	Iryna Terletska (UKR)	550	
8	Kathleen Smith (GBR)	545	
9	Lenka Kuncova (CZE)	545	
10	Maria Droste (GER)	544	
11	Margaret Parker (GBR)	534	
12	Sandra Truccolo (ITA)	533	
13	Aya Nakanishi (JPN)	526	
14	Anna Menconi (ITA)	514	
15	Georgia Giagkoulla (CYP)	426	
16	Marine Hakobyan (ARM)	101	

=== Competition bracket ===
First round
Nako Hirasawa (JPN)	142
Marine Hakobyan (ARM)	101
Lenka Kuncova (CZE)	126
Kathleen Smith (GBR)	147
Miroslava Cerna (CZE)	119
Sandra Truccolo (ITA)	117
Aya Nakanishi (JPN)	127
Paola Fantato (ITA)	154
Naomi Isozaki (JPN)	129
Anna Menconi (ITA)	128
Margaret Parker (GBR)	121
Marketa Sidkova (CZE)	140
Iryna Terletska (UKR)	141
Maria Droste (GER)	120
Georgia Giagkoulla (CYP)	99
Ko Hee Sook (KOR)	156

Second round
Nako Hirasawa (JPN)	96
Kathleen Smith (GBR)	95
Miroslava Cerna (CZE)	80
Paola Fantato (ITA)	85
Naomi Isozaki (JPN)	94
Marketa Sidkova (CZE)	85
Iryna Terletska (UKR)	92
Ko Hee Sook (KOR)	98

Semifinals
Nako Hirasawa (JPN)	88
Paola Fantato (ITA)	96
Naomi Isozaki (JPN)	91
Ko Hee Sook (KOR)	89

Finals
Paola Fantato (ITA)	97
Naomi Isozaki (JPN)	83
Third place
Nako Hirasawa (JPN)	99
Ko Hee Sook (KOR)	90
