= Archery at the 1996 Summer Paralympics – Men's individual standing =

Men's individual standing at the X Paralympic Games
- Paralympic Archery
- Venue: Stone Mountain Park
- Dates: August 1996
- Competitors: 24 from 14 nations

Medalists
1st place, gold medalist(s)		Ryszard Olejnik	Poland
2nd place, silver medalist(s)		Jean Francois Garcia	France
3rd place, bronze medalist(s)		Tae Sung An	South Korea

The Men's Individual Standing was an archery competition in the 1996 Summer Paralympics.

The gold medal was won by Ryszard Olejnik, husband of the women's champion Malgorzata Olejnik. In the final he defeated Jean Francois Garcia. The bronze medal match was won by Tae Sung An of Korea.

== Results ==
=== Qualifying round ===
Rank	Archer	Points	Notes
1	Ryszard Olejnik (POL)		
2	Jens Fudge (DEN)		
3	Jean Francois Garcia (FRA)		
4	Joseph Schreiner (LUX)		
5	Hyeon Cho (KOR)		
6	Mario Esposito (ITA)		
7	Masao Sato (JPN)		
8	Jean-Michel Favre (FRA)		
9	Tomasz Lezanski (POL)		
10	Adrian Miller (RSA)		
11	Waldemar Dusold (GER)		
12	Hak Young Lee (KOR)		
13	Kenichi Nishii (JPN)		
14	Stepan Bougaichuk (BLR)		
15	Stanislaw Jonski (POL)		
16	Jan Thulin (SWE)		
17	Ezio Luvisetto (ITA)		
18	John Murray (GBR)		
19	Mitoya Ishida (JPN)		
20	Jose Luis Gaspar (ESP)		
21	Tae Sung An (KOR)		
22	Ludo Maesen (BEL)		
23	Alberto Borello (ITA)		
24	Antonio Sanchez (ESP)		

=== Finals ===
Quarter-finals
1	Ryszard Olejnik (POL)
9	Tomasz Lezanski (POL)
21	Tae Sung An (KOR)
4	Joseph Schreiner (LUX)
3	Jean Francois Garcia (FRA)
11	Waldemar Dusold (GER)
10	Adrian Miller (RSA)
2	Jens Fudge (DEN)

Semi-finals
1	Ryszard Olejnik (POL)	92
21	Tae Sung An (KOR)	87
3	Jean Francois Garcia (FRA)	101
10	Adrian Miller (RSA)	95

Gold medal match
1	Ryszard Olejnik (POL)	98
3	Jean Francois Garcia (FRA)	94
Bronze medal match
21	Tae Sung An (KOR)	95
10	Adrian Miller (RSA)	94
