= Archery at the 2004 Summer Paralympics – Women's team =

Women's Teams open at the XII Paralympic Games
- Paralympic Archery
- Venue: Olympic Baseball Centre (Athens)
- Dates: 26 September
- Competitors: 7

Medalists
1st place, gold medalist(s)		Kathleen Smith; Margaret Parker; Anita Chapman MBE	Great Britain
2nd place, silver medalist(s)		Sandra Truccolo; Anna Menconi; Paola Fantato	Italy
3rd place, bronze medalist(s)		Lee Kyung Hee; Lee Hwa Sook; Ko Hee Sook	South Korea

The Women's Teams open archery competition at the 2004 Summer Paralympics was held on 26 September at the Olympic Baseball Centre (Athens).

The event was won by the team representing Great Britain.

== Results ==
=== Ranking Round ===
Rank	Competitor	Points	Notes
1	Japan	1732	WR
2	South Korea	1730	
3	Czech Republic	1647	
4	Great Britain	1633	
5	Poland	1625	
6	Italy	1617	
7	Ukraine	1612	

=== Competition bracket ===
Quarterfinals
Poland	168
Great Britain	210
Czech Republic	176
Italy	201
Ukraine	198
South Korea	201

Semifinals
Japan	191
Great Britain	197
Italy	205
South Korea	194

Third place
Great Britain	184
Italy	157
Third place
Japan	201
South Korea	213

== Team Lists ==
Japan; Nako Hirasawa; Naomi Isozaki; Aya Nakanishi	South Korea; Lee Kyung Hee; Lee Hwa Sook; Ko Hee Sook	Czech Republic; Miroslava Cerna; Lenka Kuncova; Marketa Sidkova	Great Britain; Kathleen Smith; Margaret Parker; Anita Chapman MBE
Poland; Alicja Bukańska; Malgorzata Olejnik; Wieslawa Wolak	Italy; Sandra Truccolo; Anna Menconi; Paola Fantato	Ukraine; Bohdana Nikitenko; Olena Struk; Iryna Terletska	
