= Archery at the 2000 Summer Paralympics – Women's team =

Women's team open at the XI Paralympic Games
- Venue: Sydney, Australia
- Dates: 20 to 25 October 2000
- Competitors: 36 from 6 nations

Medalists
1st place, gold medalist(s)		Italy
2nd place, silver medalist(s)		Great Britain
3rd place, bronze medalist(s)		Japan

The women's team open archery event at the 2000 Summer Paralympics were held from 20 to 25 October 2000.

== Ranking round ==
Rank	Team	Points
1	Italy	1659
2	Japan	1649
3	Great Britain	1623
4	Poland	1548
5	Ukraine	1546
6	Germany	1297

== Competition bracket ==
Quarterfinals
Ukraine	198
Poland	189
Germany	166
Great Britain	204

Semifinals
Italy	216
Ukraine	176
Great Britain	213
Japan	194

Third place
Italy	199
Great Britain	198
Third place
Ukraine	177
Japan	205
