= Italy at the 1996 Summer Paralympics =

- IPC code: ITA
- NPC: Comitato Italiano Paralimpico
- Website: www.comitatoparalimpico.it (in Italian)

in Atlanta
- Competitors: 79 (60 men and 19 women)
- Medals Ranked 14th: Gold 11 Silver 20 Bronze 14 Total 45

Summer Paralympics appearances (overview)
- 1960; 1964; 1968; 1972; 1976; 1980; 1984; 1988; 1992; 1996; 2000; 2004; 2008; 2012; 2016; 2020; 2024

79 athletes (60 men and 19 women) from Italy competed at the 1996 Summer Paralympics in Atlanta, United States.

== Medalists ==
Medal	Athlete	Sport	Event
Gold	Paola Fantato; Roberta Lazzaroni; Sandra Truccolo	Archery	Women's teams open
Gold	Aldo Manganaro	Athletics	Men's 100m T12
Gold	Alvise de Vidi	Athletics	Men's 400m T50
Gold	Alvise de Vidi	Athletics	Men's 800m T50
Gold	Maurizio Nalin	Athletics	Men's pentathlon P53-57
Gold	Paolo Botti; Giancarlo Galli	Cycling	Men's 200m sprint tandem open
Gold	Patrizia Spadaccini; Claudio Costa	Cycling	Mixed time trial tandem open
Gold	Patrizia Spadaccini; Claudio Costa	Cycling	Mixed individual pursuit tandem open
Gold	Luca Pancalli	Swimming	Men's 50m backstroke S4
Gold	Luca Pancalli	Swimming	Men's 50m butterfly S4
Gold	Mariella Bertini	Wheelchair fencing	Women's épée individual B
Silver	Giuseppe Gabelli; Marco Mai; Luciano Malovini	Archery	Men's team W1/W2
Silver	Sandra Truccolo	Archery	Women's individual W2
Silver	Aldo Manganaro	Athletics	Men's 200m T12
Silver	Alvise de Vidi	Athletics	Men's 1500m T50
Silver	Carlo Durante	Athletics	Men's marathon T10
Silver	Maurizio Nalin	Athletics	Men's discus F56
Silver	Pasquale Campedelli; Giancarlo Galli	Cycling	Men's 100/120k tandem open
Silver	Damiano Zanotti; Manuela Agnese	Cycling	Mixed 200m sprint tandem open
Silver	Santo Mangano	Shooting	Mixed air rifle standing SH2
Silver	Luca Pancalli	Swimming	Men's 50m freestyle S4
Silver	Luca Pancalli	Swimming	Men's 100m freestyle S4
Silver	Luca Pancalli	Swimming	Men's 200m freestyle S4
Silver	Marina Tozzini	Swimming	Women's 400m freestyle S9
Silver	Alberto Pellegrini	Wheelchair fencing	Men's épée individual A
Silver	Soriano Ceccanti	Wheelchair fencing	Men's épée individual B
Silver	Gerardo Mari; Soriano Ceccanti; Alberto Pellegrini; Ernesto Lerre	Wheelchair fencing	Men's épée team
Silver	Alberto Pellegrini	Wheelchair fencing	Men's foil individual A
Silver	Gerardo Mari	Wheelchair fencing	Men's sabre individual B
Silver	Rosalba Vettraino	Wheelchair fencing	Women's épée individual B
Silver	Laura Presutto; Mariella Bertini; Rosalba Vettraino	Wheelchair fencing	Women's foil team
Bronze	Paola Fantato	Archery	Women's individual W2
Bronze	Aldo Manganaro	Athletics	Men's 400m T12
Bronze	Maurizio Nalin	Athletics	Men's shot put F56
Bronze	Maria Ligorio	Athletics	Women's 200m T10
Bronze	Maria Ligorio	Athletics	Women's 400m T10
Bronze	Samanta Meneghelli	Athletics	Women's 300m T10-11
Bronze	Giancarlo Galli; Paolo Botti	Cycling	Men's time trial tandem open
Bronze	Antonio Martella	Shooting	Men's air pistol SH1
Bronze	Santo Mangano	Shooting	Mixed air rifle 3x40 SH2
Bronze	Santo Mangano	Shooting	Mixed air rifle prone SH2
Bronze	Oscar De Pellegrin	Shooting	Mixed English match SH1
Bronze	Marina Tozzini	Swimming	Women's 100m butterfly S9
Bronze	Maria Nardelli	Table tennis	Women's singles 5
Bronze	Alberto Pellegrini; Alberto Serafini; Giuseppe Alfieri; Soriano Ceccanti	Wheelchair fencing	Men's foil team

== See also ==
- Italy at the Paralympics
- Italy at the 1996 Summer Olympics
