= Japan at the 2000 Summer Paralympics =

- IPC code: JPN
- NPC: Japan Paralympic Committee
- Website: www.jsad.or.jp (in Japanese)

in Sydney
- Competitors: 151 (111 male, 40 female)
- Medals Ranked 12th: Gold 13 Silver 17 Bronze 11 Total 41

Summer Paralympics appearances (overview)
- 1964; 1968; 1972; 1976; 1980; 1984; 1988; 1992; 1996; 2000; 2004; 2008; 2012; 2016; 2020; 2024

There were 40 female and 111 male athletes representing the country at the 2000 Summer Paralympics.

== Medal table ==
Medal	Name	Sport	Event
Gold	Kazuya Maeba	Athletics	Men's 400m T34
Gold	Noriko Arai	Athletics	Women's 100m T34
Gold	Shigeo Yoshihara; Koichi Mizusawa	Cycling	Men's 1 km time trial tandem open
Gold	Satoshi Fujimoto	Judo	Men's -66 kg
Gold	Junichi Kawai	Swimming	Men's 50m freestyle S11
Gold	Yoshikazu Sakai	Swimming	Men's 100m backstroke S12
Gold	Yoshikazu Sakai; Yasuharu Chujo; Junichi Kawai; Koshiro Sugita	Swimming	Men's 4 × 100 m medley S11-13
Gold	Mayumi Narita	Swimming	Women's 50m backstroke S4
Gold	Mayumi Narita	Swimming	Women's 50m freestyle S4
Gold	Mayumi Narita	Swimming	Women's 100m freestyle S4
Gold	Mayumi Narita	Swimming	Women's 150m individual medley SM4
Gold	Mayumi Narita	Swimming	Women's 200m freestyle S4
Gold	Erika Nara; Sakuko Kato; Takako Fujita; Mayumi Narita	Swimming	Women's 4x50m freestyle relay 20 pts
Silver	Kazuya Maeba	Athletics	Men's 200m T34
Silver	Jun Hiromichi	Athletics	Men's 800m T53
Silver	Shigeki Yano; Tadashi Hoshino; Koji Saito; Koichi Takada	Athletics	Men's 4 × 100 m relay T13
Silver	Takefumi Anryo	Athletics	Men's club throw F51
Silver	Noriko Arai	Athletics	Women's 200m T34
Silver	Teruyo Tanaka	Athletics	Women's 200m T52
Silver	Teruyo Tanaka	Athletics	Women's 800m T52
Silver	Teruyo Tanaka	Athletics	Women's 1500m T52
Silver	Kazu Hatanaka	Athletics	Women's marathon T54
Silver	Kazumi Sakai	Athletics	Women's high jump F20
Silver	Shigeo Yoshihara; Koichi Mizusawa	Cycling	Men's sprint tandem open
Silver	Junichi Kawai	Swimming	Men's 100m backstroke S11
Silver	Junichi Kawai	Swimming	Men's 100m freestyle S11
Silver	Yoshikazu Sakai	Swimming	Men's 100m freestyle S12
Silver	Junichi Kawai	Swimming	Men's 200m individual medley SM11
Silver	Mayumi Narita	Swimming	Men's 50m breaststroke SB3
Silver	Satoko Fujiwara	Table tennis	Women's singles 3
Bronze	Naomi Isozaki; Hifumi Suzuki; Masako Yonezawa	Archery	Women's teams open
Bronze	Kazuya Maeba	Athletics	Men's 100m T34
Bronze	Mineho Ozaki	Athletics	Men's javelin F11
Bronze	Miki Yoda	Athletics	Women's 200m T52
Bronze	Miki Yoda	Athletics	Women's 400m T52
Bronze	Wakako Tsuchida	Athletics	Women's marathon T54
Bronze	Yoshikazu Matsumoto	Judo	Men's -100 kg
Bronze	Eiji Miyauchi	Judo	Men's +100 kg
Bronze	Yoshikazu Sakai	Swimming	Men's 100m butterfly S12
Bronze	Yasuko Kudo	Table tennis	Women's singles 10
Bronze	Megumi Mashiko; Hiromi Tomori; Naoko Hiromichi; Tomoe Soeda; Sachiko Minamikawa; Rie Kawakami; Mika Takabayashi; Sayuri Horikawa; Junko Sako; Chika Uemura; Kyoko Yashima; Kyoko Tsukamoto	Wheelchair basketball	Women's team

== See also ==
- Japan at the 2000 Summer Olympics
- Japan at the Paralympics

== Bibliography ==
- International Paralympic Committee (2000). "Appendix C: Athlete Numbers - By Delegation". Sydney 2000 Paralympic Games Post Games Report. Sydney.
