= Italy at the 1992 Summer Paralympics =

- IPC code: ITA
- NPC: Comitato Italiano Paralimpico
- Website: www.comitatoparalimpico.it (in Italian)

in Barcelona
- Competitors: 88 (70 men and 18 women)
- Medals Ranked 17th: Gold 10 Silver 7 Bronze 18 Total 35

Summer Paralympics appearances (overview)
- 1960; 1964; 1968; 1972; 1976; 1980; 1984; 1988; 1992; 1996; 2000; 2004; 2008; 2012; 2016; 2020; 2024

88 athletes (70 men and 18 women) from Italy competed at the 1992 Summer Paralympics in Barcelona, Spain.

== Medalists ==
Medal	Athlete	Sport	Event
Gold	Aldo Manganaro	Athletics	Men's 100m B3
Gold	Carlo Durante	Athletics	Men's B1 Marathon
Gold	Mariella Bertini	Wheelchair fencing	Individual foil 2 female
Gold	Mariella Bertini; Rossana Giarrizzo; Laura Presutto; Deborah Taffoni	Wheelchair fencing	Women's team sword
Gold	Dario Merelli; Natale Castellini; Roberto Gallucci; Paolo Martini; Hubert Perfler	Goalball	Men's tournament
Gold	Gianluca Saini	Swimming	Men's 50 m free S10
Gold	Gianluca Saini	Swimming	Men's 100 m free S10
Gold	Santo Mangano	Shooting	Air rifle 3 × 40m Mixed SH4
Gold	Paola Fantato	Archery	Individual AR2 female
Gold	Orazio Pizzorni	Archery	Men's AR2 Singles
Silver	Alessandro Kuris	Athletics	Men's J2 high jump
Silver	Aldo Manganaro	Athletics	Men's 200 m B3
Silver	Mariella Bertini	Wheelchair fencing	Individual sword 2 female
Silver	Soriano Ceccanti	Wheelchair fencing	Individual sword 2 male
Silver	Maria Nardelli	Table tennis	Open class 1-5 female
Silver	Andrea Furlan; Eberhard Walzl	Table tennis	Men's team 9
Silver	Giuseppe Gabelli; Luciano Malovini; Orazio Pizzorni	Archery	Men's AR2 Team
Bronze	Francesca Porcellato	Athletics	Women's 400m TW3
Bronze	Alvise De Vidi	Athletics	Men's 800m TW1
Bronze	Marco Re Calegari	Athletics	1500 m TW3-4 male
Bronze	Enzo Masiello	Athletics	5000 m TW3-4 male
Bronze	Maurizio Nalin	Athletics	Male THW7 disc
Bronze	Vincenzo Ciacio; Claudio Costa; Sandro Filipozzi; Aldo Manganaro	Athletics	men's 4 × 400 m B1-B3
Bronze	Maria Erlacher	Road cycling	Mixed open class tandem route
Bronze	Laura Presutto	Wheelchair fencing	Individual foil 3-4 female
Bronze	Laura Presutto	Wheelchair fencing	Individual sword 3-4 female
Bronze	Soriano Ceccanti; Ernesto Lerre; Carlo Loa	Wheelchair fencing	Men's team sword
Bronze	Roberto Valori	Swimming	Men's 100 m free S5
Bronze	Maria Nardelli	Table tennis	Individual 5 female
Bronze	Maria Nardelli; Christina Ploner; Patrizia Sacca	Table tennis	Women's team 5
Bronze	Oscar De Pellegrin	Shooting	Olympic Match Mixed SH3
Bronze	Giampiero Mercandelli	Archery	Men's AR1 Singles
Bronze	Davide Albert	Judo	Men's –60 kg
Bronze	Matteo Ardit	Judo	Men's –78 kg
Bronze	Franz Gatscher	Judo	Men's +95 kg

== See also ==
- Italy at the Paralympics
- Italy at the 1992 Summer Olympics
