= Akinobu =

- Gender: Male

Origin
- Origin: Japanese
- Meaning: Different meanings depending on the kanji used

Akinobu (written 明信, 明伸, 昭展, 顕信, 彰信, 彰展, or 彰布) is a masculine Japanese given name. Notable people with the name include:

- Akinobu Aoki (青木 彰信), Japanese Paralympic swimmer
- Akinobu Hiranaka (平仲 明信; born 1963), Japanese boxer
- Kitabatake Akinobu (北畠 顕信; 1320–1380), Japanese court noble
- Akinobu Mayumi (真弓 明信; born 1953), Japanese baseball player and manager
- Akinobu Okada (岡田 彰布; born 1957), Japanese baseball player and manager
- Akinobu Osako (大迫 明伸; born 1960), Japanese judoka
- Akinobu Uraku (有楽 彰展; born 1977), Japanese manga artist
- Akinobu Yokouchi (横内 昭展; born 1967), Japanese footballer
