= Japan at the 1996 Summer Paralympics =

- IPC code: JPN
- NPC: Japan Paralympic Committee
- Website: www.jsad.or.jp (in Japanese)

in Atlanta
- Competitors: 81 (58 men and 23 women)
- Medals Ranked 10th: Gold 14 Silver 10 Bronze 13 Total 37

Summer Paralympics appearances (overview)
- 1964; 1968; 1972; 1976; 1980; 1984; 1988; 1992; 1996; 2000; 2004; 2008; 2012; 2016; 2020; 2024

81 athletes (58 men and 23 women) from Japan competed at the 1996 Summer Paralympics in Atlanta, United States.

== Medallists ==
Medal	Name	Sport	Event
Gold	Hifumi Suzuki	Archery	Women's individual W2
Gold	Yasuhiro Une	Athletics	Men's 200m T52
Gold	Harumi Yanagawa	Athletics	Men's marathon T10
Gold	Mineho Ozaki	Athletics	Men's javelin F10
Gold	Noriko Arai	Athletics	Women's 100m T32-33
Gold	Teruyo Tanaka	Athletics	Women's 800m T51
Gold	Mutsuhiko Ogawa	Cycling	Mixed 5000m time trial tricycle CP2
Gold	Satoshi Fujimoto	Judo	Men's 65 kg
Gold	Takio Ushikubo	Judo	Men's 71 kg
Gold	Junichi Kawai	Swimming	Men's 50m freestyle B1
Gold	Junichi Kawai	Swimming	Men's 100m freestyle B1
Gold	Noriko Kajiwara	Swimming	Women's 50m breaststroke SB3
Gold	Mayumi Narita	Swimming	Women's 50m freestyle S4
Gold	Mayumi Narita	Swimming	Women's 100m freestyle S4
Silver	Masako Yonezawa; Shigeko Matsueda; Hifumi Suzuki	Archery	Women's teams open
Silver	Yasuhiro Une	Athletics	Men's 100m T52
Silver	Kazuya Murozuka	Athletics	Men's marathon T52-53
Silver	Noriko Arai	Athletics	Women's 200m T32-33
Silver	Kazu Hatanaka	Athletics	Women's 10000m T52-53
Silver	Kazu Hatanaka	Athletics	Women's marathon T52-53
Silver	Nobuhiro Kanki	Judo	Men's 60 kg
Silver	Junichi Kawai	Swimming	Men's 100m backstroke B1
Silver	Mayumi Narita	Swimming	Women's 50m backstroke S4
Silver	Mayumi Narita	Swimming	Women's 200m freestyle S4
Bronze	Koichi Minami	Archery	Men's individual W1
Bronze	Masao Sato; Kenichi Nishii; Mitoya Ishida	Archery	Men's teams standing
Bronze	Shigeo Yoshinara	Athletics	Men's high jump F10-11
Bronze	Kazu Hatanaka	Athletics	Women's 5000m T52-53
Bronze	Mutsuhiko Ogawa	Cycling	Mixed 1500m time trial CP2
Bronze	Shojiro Maeda	Cycling	Mixed 5000m time trial bicycle CP3
Bronze	Osamu Takagaki	Judo	Men's +95 kg
Bronze	Akinobu Aoki	Swimming	Men's 50m freestyle S4
Bronze	Akinobu Aoki	Swimming	Men's 100m freestyle S4
Bronze	Junichi Kawai	Swimming	Men's 200m medley B1
Bronze	Mayumi Narita	Swimming	Women's 150m medley SM4
Bronze	Kenichi Suzuki	Table tennis	Men's singles 8
Bronze	Michiyo Nuruki	Table tennis	Women's singles 9

== See also ==
- Japan at the Paralympics
- Japan at the 1996 Summer Olympics
