= Archery at the 1996 Summer Paralympics =

Archery at the X Paralympic Games
- Paralympic Archery
- Venue: Stone Mountain Park
- Competitors: 78 from 23 nations

Paralympic symbol (1994-2004)

Archery at the 1996 Summer Paralympics consisted of eight events.

== Medal table ==
Rank	Nation	Gold	Silver	Bronze	Total
1	Poland (POL)	2	1	0	3
2	South Korea (KOR)	2	0	2	4
3	Italy (ITA)	1	2	1	4
4	Japan (JPN)	1	1	2	4
5	Germany (GER)	1	0	1	2
6	Finland (FIN)	1	0	0	1
7	France (FRA)	0	1	1	2
7	Great Britain (GBR)	0	1	1	2
9	Netherlands (NED)	0	1	0	1
9	Switzerland (SUI)	0	1	0	1
Totals (10 entries)		8	8	8	24

=== Participating nations ===
- Belarus (2)
- Belgium (1)
- Canada (1)
- Denmark (2)
- Finland (3)
- France (4)
- Germany (8)
- Great Britain (7)
- Hong Kong (1)
- Ireland (1)
- Italy (9)
- Japan (9)
- Luxembourg (1)
- Netherlands (1)
- Norway (1)
- Poland (4)
- South Africa (1)
- South Korea (7)
- Spain (5)
- Sweden (3)
- Switzerland (2)
- Ukraine (2)
- United States (3)

=== Medal summary ===
Event	Gold	Silver	Bronze
Men's individual standing	Ryszard Olejnik; Poland	Jean Francois Garcia; France	Tae Sung An; South Korea
Men's individual W1	Martti Rantavouri; Finland	Kurt MacCaferri; Switzerland	Koichi Minami; Japan
Men's individual W2	Ouk Soo Lee; South Korea	Jappie Walstra; Netherlands	Udo Wolf; Germany
Men's teams standing	South Korea (KOR); Tae Sung An; Hyeon Cho; Hak Young Lee	Poland (POL); Stanislaw Jonski; Tomasz Lezanski; Ryszard Olejnik	Japan (JPN); Masao Sato; Kenichi Nishii; Mitoya Ishida
Men's teams W1/W2	Germany (GER); Hermann Nortmann; Mario Oehme; Udo Wolf	Italy (ITA); Giuseppe Gabelli; Marco Mai; Luciano Malovini	South Korea (KOR); In You; Doo Oh; Ouk Soo Lee
Women's individual standing	Malgorzata Olejnik; Poland	Anita Chapman; Great Britain	Marie-Francoise Hybois; France
Women's individual W2	Hifumi Suzuki; Japan	Sandra Truccolo; Italy	Paola Fantato; Italy
Women's teams open	Italy (ITA); Paola Fantato; Roberta Lazzaroni; Sandra Truccolo	Japan (JPN); Masako Yonezawa; Shigeko Matsueda; Hifumi Suzuki	Great Britain (GBR); Rebecca Gale; Kathleen Smith; Anita Chapman

== See also ==
- Archery at the 1996 Summer Olympics
