= Archery at the 1992 Summer Paralympics =

International sports competition

Archery at the IX Paralympic Games
- Paralympic Archery
- Competitors: 94 from 26 nations

Paralympic symbol (1988-1994)

Archery at the 1992 Summer Paralympics consisted of seven events.

== Medal table ==
Rank	Nation	Gold	Silver	Bronze	Total
1	Italy (ITA)	2	1	1	4
2	Germany (GER)	1	1	1	3
2	Japan (JPN)	1	1	1	3
4	South Korea (KOR)	1	0	2	3
5	Denmark (DEN)	1	0	1	2
6	Unified Team (EUN)	1	0	0	1
7	Finland (FIN)	0	1	0	1
7	Spain (ESP)	0	1	0	1
7	Sweden (SWE)	0	1	0	1
7	United States (USA)	0	1	0	1
11	France (FRA)	0	0	1	1
Totals (11 entries)		7	7	7	21

=== Participating nations ===
- Australia (2)
- Belgium (1)
- Canada (2)
- Colombia (1)
- Denmark (3)
- Finland (9)
- France (3)
- Germany (10)
- Great Britain (10)
- Greece (1)
- Hong Kong (1)
- Hungary (1)
- Ireland (2)
- Israel (2)
- Italy (7)
- Japan (8)
- Luxembourg (1)
- Mexico (1)
- Norway (2)
- Puerto Rico (1)
- South Korea (6)
- Spain (3)
- Sweden (5)
- Switzerland (1)
- Unified Team (4)
- United States (7)

== Medal summary ==
Event	Gold	Silver	Bronze
Men's individual AR1	Koichi Minami; Japan	Richard Spizzirri; United States	Giampiero Mercandelli; Italy
Men's individual AR2	Orazio Pizzorni; Italy	Hermann Nortmann; Germany	Udo Wolf; Germany
Men's individual open	Jens Fudge; Denmark	Kenichi Nishii; Japan	Hyun Kwan Cho; South Korea
Men's teams AR2	Germany (GER); Udo Wolf; Hermann Nortmann; Karl Bahls	Italy (ITA); Luciano Malovini; Giuseppe Gabelli; Orazio Pizzorni	South Korea (KOR); Ouk Soo Lee; Jang Sub Choi; Ki Ki Jang
Men's teams open	South Korea (KOR); Hyun Kwan Cho; Sung Hee Kim; Hak Young Lee	Spain (ESP); Jose Luis Hermosin; Jose Fernandez; Antonio Rebollo	France (FRA); Jean-Michel Favre; Jean Francois Garcia; Rene Le Bras
Women's individual AR2	Paola Fantato; Italy	Elli Korva; Finland	Hifumi Suzuki; Japan
Women's individual open	Tatiana Grishko; Unified Team	Siv Thulin; Sweden	Hanne Tved; Denmark

== See also ==
- Archery at the 1992 Summer Olympics
