= Margaret Parker (archer) =

British Paralympic archer

Personal information
- Nationality: British

Sport
- Sport: Archery
Medal record
Paralympic Games
Gold medal – first place	2004 Athens	Women's team

Margaret Parker is a British Paralympic archer.

Parker competed at the 2004 Paralympic Games where she won a gold medal in the women's team event.
