= Eriko Kumakawa =

Japanese goalball player

Personal information
- Born: 1971 (age 54–55) Kiryū, Gunma, Japan

Sport
- Sport: Women's goalball
- Disability class: B3
Medal record
Representing Japan
Paralympic Games
Bronze medal – third place	2004 Athens	Team

Eriko Kumakawa (熊川 恵利子, Kumakawa Eriko; born c. 1971) is a Japanese retired goalball player. She won a bronze medal at the 2004 Summer Paralympics.
