= Hiroshi Karube =

Japanese Paralympic swimmer

Medal record

Swimming

Representing Japan

Paralympic Games
Bronze medal – third place	2004 Athens	50 metre backstroke - SB3

Hiroshi Karube (軽部 弘, Karube Hitoshi) is a paralympic swimmer from Japan competing mainly in category SB3 events.

Hiroshi competed as part of the Japanese Paralympic swimming team at both the 2004 and 2008 Summer Paralympics. In the 2004 games he swam in the 50m freestyle finishing fifth in his heat, 50m breaststroke finishing fifth in the final, 100m freestyle finishing seventh, 150m medley finishing eighth, 200m freestyle finishing seventh, he was also part of both the Japanese 4x50m freestyle team that finished seventh and the 4x50m medley that failed to make the final. In the 2004 games he had more success winning a bronze medal in the 50m breaststroke, finished sixth in the individual medley and the Japanese team finished fourth in the 4x50m freestyle.
