= Archery at the 2004 Summer Paralympics =

Archery at the XII Paralympic Games
- Paralympic Archery
- Venue: Olympic Baseball Centre
- Dates: 22–26 September 2004
- Competitors: 96 from 31 nations

Archery at the 2004 Summer Paralympics took place at the Olympic Baseball Centre in Athens. There were three categories:

- W1 quadriplegic archers, or comparable disability, in wheelchairs
- W2 paraplegic archers, or comparable disability, in wheelchairs
- ST archers standing or shooting from a chair

== Participating countries ==
- Armenia (1)
- Australia (1)
- Belarus (1)
- Canada (1)
- China (2)
- Chinese Taipei (1)
- Cyprus (1)
- Czech Republic (4)
- Finland (1)
- France (4)
- Germany (4)
- Great Britain (8)
- Greece (2)
- Iran (3)
- Israel (1)
- Italy (7)
- Japan (7)
- South Korea (9)
- Malaysia (2)
- Mexico (1)
- Mongolia (1)
- Poland (8)
- Slovakia (4)
- Spain (3)
- Sri Lanka (1)
- Sweden (1)
- Switzerland (1)
- Thailand (4)
- Ukraine (6)
- United States (5)
- Venezuela (1)

== Medal table ==
Rank	Nation	Gold	Silver	Bronze	Total
1	Great Britain (GBR)	2	0	0	2
2	South Korea (KOR)	1	1	3	5
3	Italy (ITA)	1	1	0	2
4	China (CHN)	1	0	0	1
4	Germany (GER)	1	0	0	1
4	Slovakia (SVK)	1	0	0	1
7	Japan (JPN)	0	2	1	3
8	Poland (POL)	0	1	1	2
9	Sweden (SWE)	0	1	0	1
9	Thailand (THA)	0	1	0	1
11	United States (USA)	0	0	2	2
Totals (11 entries)		7	7	7	21

=== Medal summary ===
Event	Gold	Silver	Bronze
Men's W1	John Cavanagh; Great Britain	Anders Groenberg; Sweden	Jeffrey Fabry; United States
Men's W2	Mario Oehme; Germany	Young Joo Jung; South Korea	Hong Gu Lee; South Korea
Women's W1/W2	Paola Fantato; Italy	Naomi Isozaki; Japan	Nako Hirasawa; Japan
Men's ST	Imrich Lyocsa; Slovakia	Tomasz Lezanski; Poland	Tae Sung An; South Korea
Women's ST	Yanhong Wang; China	Wasana Karpmaichan; Thailand	Malgorzata Olejnik; Poland
Men's Team Open	South Korea (KOR); Young Joo Jung; Hak Young Lee; Hong Gu Lee	Japan (JPN); Koichi Minami; Kimimasa Onodera; Shinji Sakoda	United States (USA); Aaron Cross; Jeffrey Fabry; Kevin Stone
Women's Team Open	Great Britain (GBR); Anita Chapman; Margaret Parker; Kathleen Smith	Italy (ITA); Paola Fantato; Anna Menconi; Sandra Truccolo	South Korea (KOR); Hee Sook Ko; Hwa Sook Lee; Kyung Hee Lee

== See also ==
- Archery at the 2004 Summer Olympics
