= Koshiro Sugita =

Japanese Paralympic swimmer

Medal record

Swimming

Representing Japan

Paralympic Games
Gold medal – first place	2000 Sydney	4x100 metre medley - S11-13

Koshiro Sugita (杉田 好志郎, Sugita Kōshirō) is a Paralympic swimmer from Japan competing mainly in S12 category events.

Koshiro competed in the 2000 and 2004 Summer Paralympics as part of the Japanese swimming team. At the 2000 games he was part of the squad that broke the world record in winning the 4 × 100 m medley, he also swam in the 100m breaststroke finishing seventh and the 50m, 100m and 400m freestyle events but failed to make the final. At the 2004 games he swam in the 200m individual medley, 100m butterfly and 100m breaststroke failing to make the final in any of them.
