= Akinobu Aoki =

Japanese Paralympic swimmer

Medal record

Swimming

Representing Japan

Paralympic Games
Bronze medal – third place	1996 Atlanta	50 metre freestyle - S4
Bronze medal – third place	1996 Atlanta	100 metre freestyle - S4

Akinobu Aoki (青木 彰信, Aoki Akinobu) is a Paralympic swimmer from Japan competing mainly in category S4 events.

Akinobu competed in the 50m, 100m and 200m freestyle events at the 1996 Summer Paralympics. He finished third in the 50m and 100m but failed to finish his heat in the 200m event.
