= Yoshikazu Sakai =

Japanese Paralympic swimmer

Medal record

Men's swimming

Representing Japan

Paralympic Games
Gold medal – first place	2000 Sydney	100 metre backstroke - S12
Gold medal – first place	2000 Sydney	4x100 metre medley - S11-13
Silver medal – second place	2000 Sydney	100 metre freestyle - S12
Bronze medal – third place	2000 Sydney	100 metre butterfly - S12
Bronze medal – third place	2004 Athens	100 metre backstroke - S12
Bronze medal – third place	2004 Athens	4x100 metre freestyle - 49 pts

Yoshikazu Sakai (酒井 喜和, Sakai Yoshikazu) is a Japanese paralympic swimmer who competes mainly in category S11 events.

Yoshikazu competed in two paralympics for the Japanese swimming team first in 2000 and then again in 2004. In 2000 he set a new world record in both the heats and the final of the 100m backstroke and was part of the Japanese relay team that broke the 4 × 100 m medley record to beat Great Britain by 0.07 seconds, he also won a silver in the 100m freestyle and a bronze medal in the 100m butterfly after breaking the world record in the heats only to see Raman Makarau and Ian Sharpe go quicker in the second heat and both go even quicker in the final. He also swam in the 400m freestyle finishing fourth and finished sixth in the 50m freestyle. In the 2004 games he had less success, winning just two bronzes, in the 4 × 100 m freestyle and 100m backstroke, he was also part of the medley team that finished fourth in the 4 × 100 m and individually finished seventh in the 400m freestyle and 100m freestyle, sixth in the 200m individual medley and fifth in the 100m butterfly.
