= Anita Chapman =

British Paralympic archer (born 1952)

Anita Chapman MBE
Personal information
- Born: 3 July 1952 (age 73) Doncaster, England
Medal record
Women's archery
Representing Great Britain
Paralympic Games
Gold medal – first place	2000 Sydney	Individual Standing
Gold medal – first place	2004 Athens	Teams Open
Silver medal – second place	1996 Atlanta	Individual Standing
Silver medal – second place	2000 Sydney	Teams Open
Bronze medal – third place	1996 Atlanta	Teams Open

Anita Chapman MBE (born 3 July 1952) is a British Paralympic archer who won medals at four Paralympics.

== Career ==
In individual medals she won silver at the 1996 Summer Paralympics she joined Kathleen Smith and Rebecca Gale to gain a bronze medal for the UK in the women's archery team open. This was better than 1992 when the UK had won no medals.

Chapman won gold at the 2000 Summer Paralympics. In team medals she was on the bronze medal team at the 1996 Summer Paralympics, the silver medalist team at the 2000 Summer Paralympics, and the gold medal-winning team at the 2004 Summer Paralympics.

Chapman was appointed Member of the Order of the British Empire (MBE) in the 2003 New Year Honours for services to Archery.
