= Noriko Arai =

Japanese Paralympic athlete

Medal record

Track and field (athletics)

Representing Japan

Paralympic Games
Gold medal – first place	1996 Atlanta	100 metres - T32-33
Gold medal – first place	2000 Sydney	100 metres - T34
Silver medal – second place	1996 Atlanta	200 metres - T32-33
Silver medal – second place	2000 Sydney	200 metres - T34
Bronze medal – third place	2004 Athens	200 metres - T34

Noriko Arai (荒井 のり子, Arai Noriko; born 1973) is a paralympic athlete from Japan who competes mainly in category T34 sprint events.

Noriko competed in the 100m and 200m at three consecutive Paralympics. In her first two games in 1996 and 2000, she won gold in the 100m and silver in the 200m on both occasions. In 2008, she won the bronze medal in the same events.
