= Nako Hirasawa =

Japanese Paralympic archer

Personal information
- Nationality: Japanese

Sport
- Country: Japan
- Sport: Para-archery
Medal record
Paralympic Games
Bronze medal – third place	2004 Athens	individual W1/W2

Nako Hirasawa (平澤 奈古, Hirasawa Nako; born 1 August 1972) is a Japanese Paralympic archer.

Hirasawa began archery in 1996 and she made her international debut in 2003.

She completed at the Paralympic Games in 2004, where she won a bronze medal in the individual W1/W2 event, and in 2016.
