= Kathleen Smith (archer) =

British Paralympic archer

Personal information
- Nationality: British
- Spouse: Gary Critchlow-Smith
Medal record
Women's archery
Representing Great Britain
Paralympic Games
Gold medal – first place	2004 Athens	Teams Open
Silver medal – second place	2000 Sydney	Teams Open
Silver medal – second place	2000 Sydney	Women's individual W1/W2
Bronze medal – third place	1996 Atlanta	Teams Open

Kathleen Smith or Kathy Critchlow-Smith is a British Paralympic archer who has competed at five Paralympics.

== Life ==
It was the 1992 Summer Paralympics in Barcelona that first made Smith aware of international competition. She was one of the 21 women and 74 men there from 26 countries to compete at seven sports. Great Britain won no medals at archery that year. Smith saw that her competitors had coaches to encourage them. She had already met Ray Fields so on her return in 1994 she joined Sportsable which was a sports disability club in Maidenhead. Smith's motive was to gain Fields as a coach. Fields had become disabled when he was 70 years old.

She concentrated on her archery skills and by 1996 she was considered an elite sportswoman and a contestant at the 1996 Atlanta Paralympics. She joined Anita Chapman and Rebecca Gale to gain a bronze medal for Great Britain in the women’s archery team open. At these Games, Chapman also won a silver medal.

Smith had surgery in 1999 and thought this might rule her out of competition, but at the 2000 Sydney Paralympics she was again in Britain's team of three archers who competed for the women’s archery team open, winning the silver. Smith gained an individual silver in the women’s individual W1/W2 behind Paola Fantato of Italy.

Four years later at the 2004 Athens Paralympics, Smith won her fourth and last medal, winning the gold in the women’s archery team open with Chapman again as a team mate.

She was a competitor at five Paralympics: Barcelona 1992, Atalanta 1996, Sydney 2000, Athens 2004 and Beijing 2008.

== Private life ==
She is married to Gary Critchlow-Smith who volunteers as an archery tutor. Both she and her husband are long tern supporters of sports for those with disabilities. They took the Hungarian archer Tamas Gaspar under their wing as he aimed to get to the 2020 Summer Paralympics. They were both given lifetime achievement awards at the 8th Get Berkshire Active Awards by SportsAble. They are both qualified coaches and they give weekly coaching sessions.
