= Archery at the 2000 Summer Paralympics =

Archery at the XI Paralympic Games
- Paralympic Archery
- Venue: Sydney International Archery Park
- Competitors: 96 from 25 nations

Paralympic symbol (1994-2004)

Archery at the 2000 Summer Paralympics consisted of seven events, four for men and three for women. Competitors were divided into three categories:

- W1: quadriplegic archers, or comparable disability, in wheelchairs
- W2: paraplegic archers, or comparable disability, in wheelchairs
- Standing: archers standing or shooting from a chair

== Medal table ==
Rank	Nation	Gold	Silver	Bronze	Total
1	Italy (ITA)	3	0	1	4
2	South Korea (KOR)	2	1	2	5
3	Great Britain (GBR)	1	2	0	3
4	Czech Republic (CZE)	1	0	0	1
5	France (FRA)	0	2	1	3
6	Poland (POL)	0	1	1	2
7	Ukraine (UKR)	0	1	0	1
8	Japan (JPN)	0	0	1	1
8	Slovakia (SVK)	0	0	1	1
Totals (9 entries)		7	7	7	21

=== Participating nations ===
- Australia (4)
- Austria (1)
- Canada (2)
- Czech Republic (3)
- Denmark (1)
- Finland (3)
- France (7)
- Germany (7)
- Great Britain (7)
- Hong Kong (3)
- Iran (3)
- Italy (7)
- Japan (8)
- Mongolia (1)
- Netherlands (2)
- New Zealand (1)
- Poland (6)
- Slovakia (4)
- South Korea (7)
- Spain (3)
- Sweden (2)
- Switzerland (2)
- Thailand (4)
- Ukraine (5)
- United States (3)

== Medallists ==
Event	Gold	Silver	Bronze
Men's individual standing	Tae Sung An; South Korea	Serhiy Atamanenko; Ukraine	Imrich Lyocsa; Slovakia
Men's individual W1	Zdenek Sebek; Czech Republic	Olivier Hatem; France	Dejan Miladinovic; France
Men's individual W2	Hong Gu Lee; South Korea	Young Joo Jung; South Korea	Oscar De Pellegrin; Italy
Men's teams open	Italy (ITA); Salvatore Carrubba; Oscar De Pellegrin; Giuseppe Gabelli	France (FRA); Charles Est; Dejan Miladinovic; Olivier Hatem	South Korea (KOR); Hong Gu Lee; Ouk Soo Lee; Hyun Kwan Cho
Women's individual standing	Anita Chapman; Great Britain	Małgorzata Olejnik; Poland	Małgorzata Korzeniowska; Poland
Women's individual W1/W2	Paola Fantato; Italy	Kathleen Smith; Great Britain	Hee Sook Ko; South Korea
Women's teams open	Italy (ITA); Paola Fantato; Sandra Truccolo; Anna Menconi	Great Britain (GBR); Anita Chapman; Kathleen Smith; Jane White	Japan (JPN); Naomi Isozaki; Hifumi Suzuki; Masako Yonezawa

== See also ==
- Archery at the 2000 Summer Olympics
