= Hifumi Suzuki =

Japanese Paralympic archer (born 1957)

Personal information
- Nationality: Japanese
- Born: 18 December 1957 (age 68)
Medal record
Women's archery
Representing Japan
Paralympic Games
Gold medal – first place	1996 Atlanta	Individual W2
Silver medal – second place	1984 New York & Stoke Mandeville	Double FITA Round Paraplegic
Silver medal – second place	1996 Atlanta	Teams Open
Bronze medal – third place	1992 Barcelona	Individual AR2
Bronze medal – third place	2000 Sydney	Teams Open

Hifumi Suzuki (鈴木 十二美, Suzuki Hifumi, born 18 December 1957) is a Japanese Paralympic archer who competed at four different games and gained several medals.

== Life ==
Suzuki was born in 1957. She shoots with a recurve bow in the Paralympic W2 class for paraplegics. She first competed at the 1984 Summer Paralympics. She also went to the paralympics in 1992 and 1996. At the 1996 Paralympics in Atlanta, she won an individual gold medal as well as a silver medal in the women's team open event alongside Shigeko Matsueda and Masako Yonezawa. She also competed in 2000 where she won a bronze medal women's teams open event alongside Naomi Isozaki and Masako Yonezawa.
