= Anna Menconi =

Italian Paralympic archer

Personal information
- Nationality: Italian
- Born: 27 July 1971 (age 55)

Sport
- Country: Italy
- Sport: Para-archery
Medal record
Paralympic Games
Gold medal – first place	2000 Sydney	Teams open
Silver medal – second place	2004 Athens	Teams open

Anna Menconi (born 27 July 1971) is an Italian Paralympic archer.

Menconi competed at the Paralympic Games in 2000, where she won a gold medal in the Women's teams open event, and in 2004 where she won a silver medal in the Women's teams open event.
