= Sandra Truccolo =

Italian Paralympic archer

Personal information
- Nationality: Italian
- Born: 25 September 1964 (age 61) Venice, Italy

Sport
- Country: Italy
- Sport: Archery
Medal record
Women's archery
Representing Italy
Paralympic Games
Gold medal – first place	1996 Atlanta	Teams Open
Gold medal – first place	2000 Sydney	Teams Open
Silver medal – second place	1996 Atlanta	Individual W2
Silver medal – second place	2004 Athens	Teams Open

Sandra Truccolo (born 25 September 1964) is an Italian paralympic archer and all round athlete. She has represented Italy as an Archer at the 1996 Summer Paralympics. She competed at the Archery at the 2000 Summer Paralympics. She was also in the Women's archery team at the 2004 Paralympics.

Truccolo married the Italian sprint canoeist Daniele Scarpa in 2007 and they offer canoeing courses.
