= Naomi Isozaki =

Japanese Paralympic archer

Personal information
- Nationality: Japanese

Sport
- Country: Japan
- Sport: Para-archery
Medal record
Paralympic Games
Silver medal – second place	2004 Athens	individual W1/W2
Bronze medal – third place	2000 Sydney	Teams open

Naomi Isozaki (礒崎 直美, Isozaki Naomi) is a Japanese Paralympic archer.

Isozaki competed at the Paralympic Games in 2000, where she won a bronze medal in the women's teams open event alongside Hifumi Suzuki and Masako Yonezawa, and in 2004, where she won a silver medal in the individual W1/W2 event.
