= Giuseppe Gabelli =

Italian Paralympic archer (born 1958)

Personal information
- Born: 1958 (age 67–68) Varano de' Melegari, Italy

Sport
- Country: Italy
- Sport: Para archery
Medal record
Event	1st	2nd	3rd
Paralympic Games	1	3	0

Giuseppe Gabelli (born 1958) is a former Italian paralympic archer who won a four medals at the Summer Paralympics.

He competed in four edition of Summer Paralympics and won a medal in every single edition.
