= Małgorzata Olejnik =

Polish politician (born 1966)

member of Sejm 2005-2007
- In office 25 September 2005 – 2007

Personal details
- Born: 3 June 1966 (age 60) Kielce, Poland
- Party: Samoobrona
- Sports career
Medal record
Women's archery
Representing Poland
Paralympic Games
Gold medal – first place	1996 Atlanta	Individual Standing
Silver medal – second place	2000 Sydney	Individual Standing
Bronze medal – third place	2004 Athens	Individual Standing

Małgorzata Dorota Olejnik (born 3 June 1966 in Kielce) is a Polish politician. She was elected to the Sejm on 25 September 2005, getting 12398 votes in 33 Kielce district, as candidate from the Samoobrona Rzeczpospolitej Polskiej list.

Olejnik, a quadriplegic who uses a wheelchair, is also an accomplished archer and has represented Poland at the Paralympic Games. She won a gold medal at the 1996 games in Atlanta, a silver in 2000 in Sydney, and a bronze in 2004 in Athens. At the 2008 Summer Paralympics in Beijing, she competed in the women's individual recurve standing event. She won her first two matches and lost her third in the semifinal. She advanced to the bronze medal match but lost to Lindsey Carmichael of the United States and finished in fourth place.

== See also ==
- Members of Polish Sejm 2005-2007
