= Paola Fantato =

Italian archer (born 1959)

Personal information
- Born: 14 September 1959 (age 66) Verona, Italy

Sport
- Country: Italy
- Sport: Archery; Paralympic archery
- Retired: 2004
Medal record
Event / 1st / 2nd / 3rd; Paralympic Games / 5 / 1 / 2
Women's archery
Representing Italy
Paralympic Games
Gold medal – first place	1992 Barcelona	Individual AR2
Gold medal – first place	1996 Atlanta	Teams open
Gold medal – first place	2000 Sydney	Individual W1/W2
Gold medal – first place	2000 Sydney	Teams open
Gold medal – first place	2004 Athens	Individual W1/W2
Silver medal – second place	2004 Athens	Team
Bronze medal – third place	1988 Seoul	Double class 2-6
Bronze medal – third place	1996 Atlanta	Individual W2

Paola Fantato (13 September 1959) is an Italian former archer, who won 8 medals (5 gold) at the Summer Paralympics.

She participated also in the 1996 Summer Olympics.

== Biography ==
At age 8 she contracted poliomyelitis, and has been a wheelchair user ever since. She competed in archery at five consecutive Summer Paralympic Games from 1988 to 2004 and won a total of five gold medals, one silver, and two bronzes. She participated in both the 1996 Summer Olympics and Paralympics, taking a bronze medal in women's individual and a gold in women's team at the Paralympic Games. She won gold medals in both the individual and team events for archery at the 2000 Summer Paralympics, and took gold and silver at the 2004 Paralympics.

== See also ==
- List of athletes who have competed in the Paralympics and Olympics
- Italian multiple medallists at the Summer Paralympics
- Walk of Fame of Italian Sport
