= Archery at the 2008 Summer Paralympics – Men's individual recurve =

The Men's individual recurve was one of the events held in archery at the 2008 Summer Paralympics in Beijing. There were two classes: a class for W1 & W2 wheelchair competitors and a class for standing archers. In the ranking round each archer shot 72 arrows; in the knockout stages each match was 12 arrows each.

== W1/W2 ==
Men's individual recurve W1/W2 at the XIII Paralympic Games
- Paralympic Archery
- Venue: Olympic Green Archery Field
- Dates: 9–14 September 2008
- Competitors: 30 from 17 nations

Medalists
1st place, gold medalist(s)		Cheng Changjie	China
2nd place, silver medalist(s)		Marco Vitale	Italy
3rd place, bronze medalist(s)		Tseng Lung Hui	Chinese Taipei

The W1/W2 class was won by Cheng Changjie, representing China, while Italy's Marco Vitale won the silver.

=== Ranking Round ===
Rank	Archer	Score	10's	X's
1	Taras Chopyk (UKR)	636	22	6
2	Kim Hong-kyu (KOR)	632	18	4
3	Lee Hong-gu (KOR)	629	19	8
4	Oscar de Pellegrin (ITA)	629	14	4
5	Cheng Changjie (CHN)	626	16	6
6	Tseng Lung-hui (TPE)	625	19	11
7	Marco Vitale (ITA)	624	16	5
8	Muhamad Salam Sidik (MAS)	620	14	4
9	Jung Young-joo (KOR)	616	11	3
10	Kevin Stone (USA)	616	9	2
11	Mario Oehme (GER)	611	8	2
12	Zulkifli Mat Zin (MAS)	610	15	5
13	Stephane Gilbert (FRA)	602	16	3
14	Mustafa Demir (TUR)	600	13	2
15	Piotr Sawicki (POL)	593	11	7
16	Ozgur Ozen (TUR)	591	8	3
17	Manuel Candela (ESP)	582	11	3
18	Sathien Phimthong (THA)	578	9	2
19	Paul James Browne (GBR)	576	11	3
20	Tsunehiko Naganuma (JPN)	576	7	2
21	Miroslav Kacina (SVK)	566	12	2
22	Nobuji Yoshida (JPN)	560	10	3
23	Amit Dror (ISR)	557	10	1
24	Jose Manuel Marin (ESP)	557	9	3
25	Antonino Lisotta (ITA)	556	10	2
26	Chen Wu-ying (TPE)	552	2	1
27	Suthi Raksamai (THA)	550	6	2
28	Janusz Bulyk (POL)	549	7	1
29	Russell Wolfe (USA)	539	10	1
30	Michael Karaphillides (GBR)	520	3	0

=== Competition bracket ===
Round of 32
Manuel Candela (ESP)	87
Ozgur Ozen (TUR)	96
Jung Young Joo (KOR)	102
Jose Manuel Marin (ESP)	88
Antonino Lisotta (ITA)	90
Muhamad Salam Sidik (MAS)	97
Cheng Changjie (CHN)	104
Janusz Bulyk (POL)	88
Miroslav Kacina (SVK)	83
Zulkifli Mat Zin (MAS)	96
Stephane Gilbert (FRA)	93
Tsunehiko Naganuma (JPN)	80
Russell Wolfe (USA)	76
Oscar de Pellegrin (ITA)	107
Lee Hong Gu (KOR)	105
Michael Karaphillides (GBR)	80
Paul James Browne (GBR)	104
Mustafa Demir (TUR)	90
Mario Oehme (GER)	74
Nobuji Yoshida (JPN)	89
Suthi Raksamai (THA)	85
Tseng Lung Hui (TPE)	104
Marco Vitale (ITA)	104
Chen Wu Ying (TPE)	99
Amit Dror (ISR)	88
Kevin Stone (USA)	92
Piotr Sawicki (POL)	104
Sathien Phimthong (THA)	89

Round of 16
Taras Chopyk (UKR)	100
Ozgur Ozen (TUR)	107
Jung Young Joo (KOR)	106
Muhamad Salam Sidik (MAS)	94
Cheng Changjie (CHN)	108
Zulkifli Mat Zin (MAS)	103
Stephane Gilbert (FRA)	101
Oscar de Pellegrin (ITA)	99
Lee Hong Gu (KOR)	108
Paul James Browne (GBR)	103
Nobuji Yoshida (JPN)	98
Tseng Lung Hui (TPE)	106
Marco Vitale (ITA)	101
Kevin Stone (USA)	97
Piotr Sawicki (POL)	104
Kim Hong Kyu (KOR)	99

Quarterfinals
Ozgur Ozen (TUR)	103
Jung Young Joo (KOR)	102
Cheng Changjie (CHN)	99
Stephane Gilbert (FRA)	95
Lee Hong Gu (KOR)	105
Tseng Lung Hui (TPE)	105
Marco Vitale (ITA)	102
Piotr Sawicki (POL)	98

Semifinals
Ozgur Ozen (TUR)	98
Cheng Changjie (CHN)	112
Tseng Lung Hui (TPE)	101
Marco Vitale (ITA)	103

Final
Cheng Changjie (CHN)	108
Marco Vitale (ITA)	104
Third place
Ozgur Ozen (TUR)	92
Tseng Lung Hui (TPE) *	92

* Decided by additional arrows: Ozgur Ozen shot 6; Tseng Lung Hui shot 9.

== Standing ==
Men's individual recurve Standing at the XIII Paralympic Games
- Paralympic Archery
- Venue: Olympic Green Archery Field
- Dates: 9–14 September
- Competitors: 24 from 14 nations

Medalists
1st place, gold medalist(s)		Dambadondogiin Baatarjav	Mongolia
2nd place, silver medalist(s)		Fabrice Meunier	France
3rd place, bronze medalist(s)		Chen Yegang	China

The Standing class was won by Dambadondogiin Baatarjav, representing Mongolia.

=== Ranking Round ===
Rank	Archer	Score	10's	X's
1	Mario Esposito (ITA)	631	19	6
2	Chen Yegang (CHN)	628	18	5
3	Dong Zhi (CHN)	625	20	8
4	Cho Hyun-kwan (KOR)	625	19	3
5	Kimimasa Onodera (JPN)	620	16	8
6	Dambadondogiin Baatarjav (MGL)	618	17	3
7	Takahiro Hasegawa (JPN)	611	14	7
8	Timur Tuchinov (RUS)	606	14	5
9	Juan Miguel Zarzuela (ESP)	602	15	6
10	Imrich Lyocsa (SVK)	602	10	2
11	Mick Beard (GBR)	597	9	2
12	Sakon Inkaew (THA)	597	8	2
13	Fabrice Meunier (FRA)	597	7	0
14	Tomasz Lezanski (POL)	596	12	5
15	Yoon Young Bae (KOR)	594	8	3
16	Zhu Weiliang (CHN)	591	11	3
17	An Tae-sung (KOR)	580	18	8
18	Yuriy Kopiy (UKR)	576	8	2
19	Antonio Sanchez (ESP)	571	6	2
20	Akira Haraguchi (JPN)	557	7	3
21	Ryszard Olejnik (POL)	550	11	1
22	Vladimir Majercak (SVK)	546	7	3
23	Serhiy Atamanenko (UKR)	510	6	1
24	Romaios Roumeliotis (GRE)	475	5	1

=== Competition bracket ===
Round of 32
An Tae Sung (KOR)	95
Zhu Weiliang (CHN)	95
Juan Miguel Zarzuela (ESP)	97
Romaios Roumeliotis (GRE)	90
Ryszard Olejnik (POL)	89
Sakon Inkaew (THA)	102
Fabrice Meunier (FRA)	109
Akira Haraguchi (JPN)	83
Antonio Sanchez (ESP)	88
Tomasz Lezanski (POL)	97
Mick Beard (GBR)	88
Vladimir Majercak (SVK)	87
Serhiy Atamanenko (UKR)	73
Imrich Lyocsa (SVK)	95
Yoon Young Bae (KOR)	91
Yuriy Kopiy (UKR)	102

Round of 16
Mario Esposito (ITA)	101
An Tae Sung (KOR)	98
Juan Miguel Zarzuela (ESP)	98
Timur Tuchinov (RUS)	97
Kimimasa Onodera (JPN)	96
Sakon Inkaew (THA)	100
Fabrice Meunier (FRA)	101
Cho Hyun Kwan (KOR)	96
Dong Zhi (CHN)	108
Tomasz Lezanski (POL)	102
Mick Beard (GBR)	91
Dambadondogiin Baatarjav (MGL)	104
Takahiro Hasegawa (JPN)	94
Imrich Lyocsa (SVK)	100
Yuriy Kopiy (UKR)	94
Chen Yegang (CHN)	100

Quarterfinals
Mario Esposito (ITA)	102
Juan Miguel Zarzuela (ESP)	95
Sakon Inkaew (THA)	99
Fabrice Meunier (FRA)	103
Dong Zhi (CHN)	104
Dambadondogiin Baatarjav (MGL)	106
Imrich Lyocsa (SVK)	95
Chen Yegang (CHN)	98

Semifinals
Mario Esposito (ITA)	91
Fabrice Meunier (FRA)	95
Dambadondogiin Baatarjav (MGL)	105
Chen Yegang (CHN)	98

Final
Fabrice Meunier (FRA)	90
Dambadondogiin Baatarjav (MGL)	94
Third place
Mario Esposito (ITA)	93
Chen Yegang (CHN)	98
