= Archery at the 2012 Summer Paralympics – Men's individual recurve =

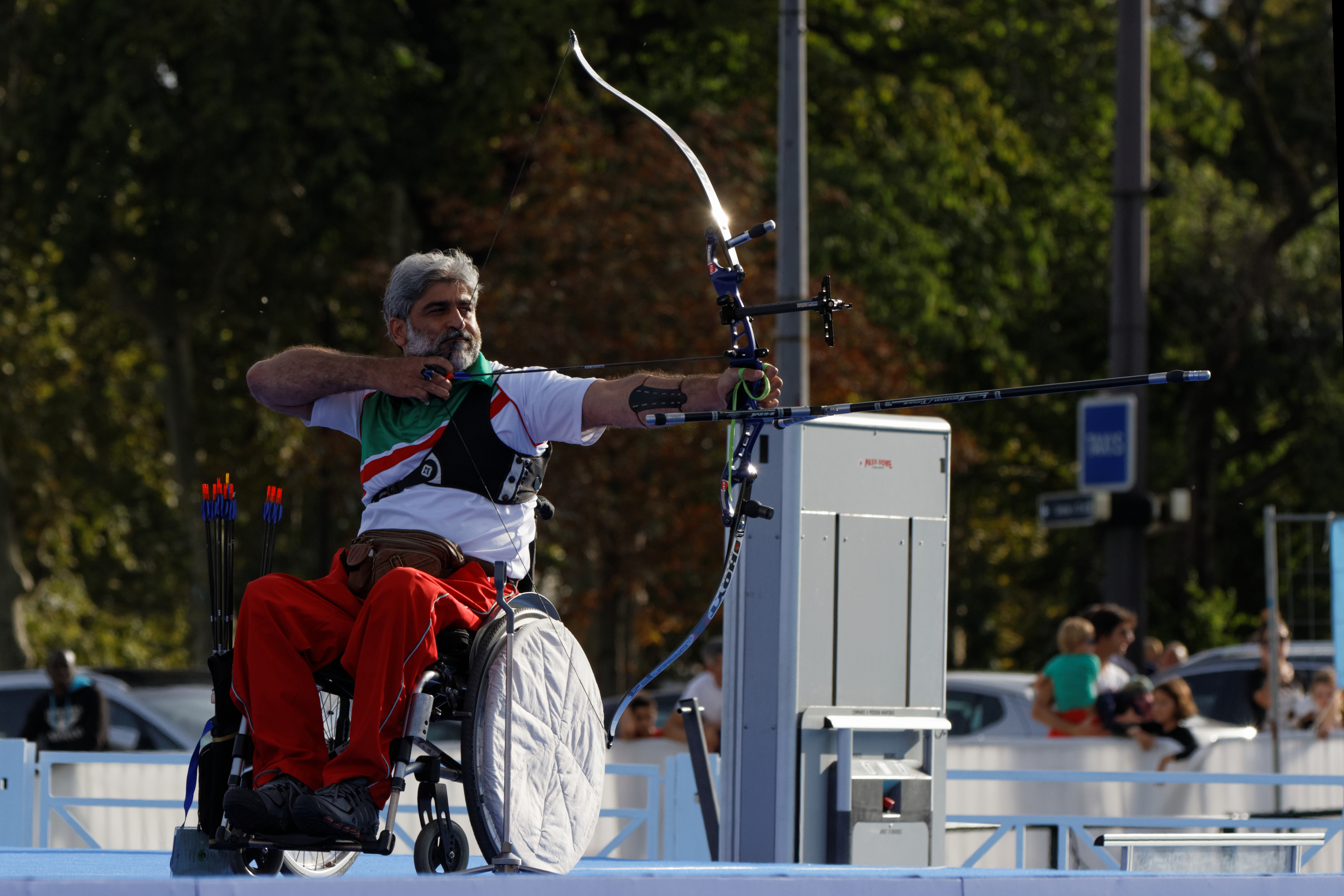
Ebrahim Ranjbar Kivaj (ARW2) in September 2013.

The Men's individual recurve archery discipline at the 2012 Summer Paralympics was contested in two classifications, one combined of W1/W2 wheelchair competitors and one for standing archers. The competitions ran from August 30 to September 3.

In the ranking rounds each archer shot 72 arrows. In the knock-out stages each archer shot three arrows per set, scoring two points for a won set and one for a draw. Matches were won by the first archer to six points.

== W1/W2 ==
Archery, Men's recurve W1/W2 at the XIV Paralympic Games
- Venue: Royal Artillery Barracks
- Dates: August 30 - September 3, 2012
- Competitors: 24 from 16 nations

Medalists
1st place, gold medalist(s)		Oscar De Pellegrin	Italy
2nd place, silver medalist(s)		Hasihin Sanawi	Malaysia
3rd place, bronze medalist(s)		Tseng Lung Hui	Chinese Taipei

=== Ranking Round ===
PR = Paralympic Record.

Rank	Archer	Score	10's	X's	Notes
1	Tseng Lung Hui (TPE)	650	0	0	PR
2	Ebrahim Ranjbarkivaj (IRI)	648	23	6	
3	Cheng Changjie (CHN)	626	11	7	
4	Oscar De Pellegrin (ITA)	625	7	1	
5	Lee Myeong-gu (KOR)	610	0	0	
6	Jung Young Joo (KOR)	607	0	0	
7	Roham Shahabipour (IRI)	603	0	0	
8	Piotr Sawicki (POL)	600	5	2	
9	Paul Browne (GBR)	598	5	1	
10	Ozgur Ozen (TUR)	597	6	2	
11	Jose Marin Rodriguez (ESP)	591	11	1	
12	Maik Szarszewski (GER)	589	8	1	
13	Johan Wildeboer (NED)	588	14	2	
14	You In Sik (KOR)	581	13	4	
15	Vittorio Bartoli (ITA)	579	0	0	
16	Zulkifli Mat Zin (MAS)	572	5	1	
17	Mustafa Demir (TUR)	569	0	0	
18	Taras Chopyk (UKR)	561	6	2	
19	Hasihin Sanawi (MAS)	559	0	0	
20	Russell Wolfe (USA)	555	9	2	
21	T Jose A Baez (MEX)	555	8	1	
22	Yutaka Ajima (JPN)	539	4	0	
23	Chung Hua Chen (TPE)	537	0	0	
24	Mohd Zafi Rahman Mat Saleh (MAS)	481	0	0	

=== Competition bracket ===
==== Section 1 ====
Round of 32			Round of 16			Quarter-finals
			1	Tseng Lung Hui (TPE)	6
17	Mustafa Demir (TUR)	6	17	Mustafa Demir (TUR)	2
16	Zulkifli Mat Zin (MAS)	4				1	Tseng Lung Hui (TPE)	6
9	Paul Browne (GBR)	6				9	Paul Browne (GBR)	4
24	Mohd Zafi Rahman Mat Saleh (MAS)	0	9	Paul Browne (GBR)	6
			8	Piotr Sawicki (POL)	4

==== Section 2 ====
Round of 32			Round of 16			Quarter-finals
			5	Lee Myeong-gu (KOR)	6
21	T Jose A Baez (MEX)	0	12	Maik Szarszewski (GER)	0
12	Maik Szarszewski (GER)	6				5	Lee Myeong-gu (KOR)	4
13	Johan Wildeboer (NED)	0				4	Oscar De Pellegrin (ITA)	6
20	Russell Wolfe (USA)	6	20	Russell Wolfe (USA)	0
			4	Oscar De Pellegrin (ITA)	6

==== Section 3 ====
Round of 32			Round of 16			Quarter-finals
			3	Cheng Changjie (CHN)	5
19	Hasihin Sanawi (MAS)	6	19	Hasihin Sanawi (MAS)	6
14	You In Sik (KOR)	2				19	Hasihin Sanawi (MAS)	6
11	Jose Marin Rodriguez (ESP)	6				6	Jung Young Joo (KOR)	4
22	Yutaka Ajima (JPN)	0	11	Jose Marin Rodriguez (ESP)	2
			6	Jung Young Joo (KOR)	6

==== Section 4 ====
Round of 32			Round of 16			Quarter-finals
			7	Roham Shahabipour (IRI)	6
23	Chung Hua Chen (TPE)	2	10	Ozgur Ozen (TUR)	0
10	Ozgur Ozen (TUR)	6				7	Roham Shahabipour (IRI)	1
15	Vittorio Bartoli (ITA)	3				2	Ebrahim Ranjbarkivaj (IRI)	7
18	Taras Chopyk (UKR)	7	18	Taras Chopyk (UKR)	1
			2	Ebrahim Ranjbarkivaj (IRI)	7

==== Finals ====
Quarter-finals
1	Tseng Lung Hui (TPE)	6
9	Paul Browne (GBR)	4
5	Lee Myeong-gu (KOR)	4
4	Oscar De Pellegrin (ITA)	6
19	Hasihin Sanawi (MAS)	6
6	Jung Young Joo (KOR)	4
7	Roham Shahabipour (IRI)	1
2	Ebrahim Ranjbarkivaj (IRI)	7

Semi-finals
1	Tseng Lung Hui (TPE)	3
4	Oscar De Pellegrin (ITA)	7
19	Hasihin Sanawi (MAS)	6
2	Ebrahim Ranjbarkivaj (IRI)	5

Gold medal match
4	Oscar De Pellegrin (ITA)	6
19	Hasihin Sanawi (MAS)	5
Bronze medal match
1	Tseng Lung Hui (TPE)	7
2	Ebrahim Ranjbarkivaj (IRI)	3

== Standing ==
Archery, Men's recurve standing at the XIV Paralympic Games
- Venue: Royal Artillery Barracks
- Dates: August 30
- Competitors: 24 from 15 nations

Medalists
1st place, gold medalist(s)		Timur Tuchinov	Russia
2nd place, silver medalist(s)		Oleg Shestakov	Russia
3rd place, bronze medalist(s)		Mikhail Oyun	Russia

=== Ranking Round ===
PR = Paralympic Record. DT=Disk toss used to break the tie.

Rank	Archer	Score	10's	X's	Notes
1	Kenny Allen (GBR)	651	24	7	PR
2	Timur Tuchinov (RUS)	638	17	6	
3	Phil Bottomley (GBR)	630	21	3	
4	Dong Zhi (CHN)	627	11	2	
5	Mikhail Oyun (RUS)	623	20	3	
6	Joel Perrot (FRA)	614	14	6	
7	Alexandre Lasvenes (FRA)	613	14	4	
8	Matthias Alpers (GER)	613	8	3	
9	Oleg Shestakov (RUS)	608	0	0	
10	Li Zongshan (CHN)	605	17	5	
11	Eric Bennett (USA)	604	6	4	
12	Sakon Inkaew (THA)	602	5	1	
13	Yuriy Kopiy (UKR)	602	0	0	
14	Wiktor Patryas (POL)	596	14	1	
15	Kim Suk Ho (KOR)	594	0	0	DT
16	Kim Yong-ok (KOR)	594	0	0	DT
17	Zafer Korkmaz (TUR)	588	7	1	
18	Amin Alikhani Nezhad (IRI)	588	2	0	
19	Oguzhan Polat (TUR)	588	0	0	
20	Yang Ching Jen (TPE)	581	5	1	
21	Imrich Lyocsa (SVK)	575	8	0	
22	Mario Esposito (ITA)	574	7	1	
23	Roman Chayka (UKR)	557	6	3	
24	Murray Elliot (GBR)	542	4	1	

=== Competition bracket ===
==== Section 1 ====
Round of 32			Round of 16			Quarter-finals
			1	Kenny Allen (GBR)	4
17	Zafer Korkmaz (TUR)	6	17	Zafer Korkmaz (TUR)	6
16	Kim Yong-ok (KOR)	0				17	Zafer Korkmaz (TUR)	4
9	Oleg Shestakov (RUS)	6				9	Oleg Shestakov (RUS)	6
24	Murray Elliot (GBR)	0	9	Oleg Shestakov (RUS)	6
			8	Matthias Alpers (GER)	4

==== Section 2 ====
Round of 32			Round of 16			Quarter-finals
			5	Mikhail Oyun (RUS)	7
21	Imrich Lyocsa (SVK)	0	12	Sakon Inkaew (THA)	1
12	Sakon Inkaew (THA)	6				5	Mikhail Oyun (RUS)	6
13	Yuriy Kopiy (UKR)	6				13	Yuriy Kopiy (UKR)	2
20	Yang Ching Jen (TPE)	5	13	Yuriy Kopiy (UKR)	6
			4	Dong Zhi (CHN)	5

==== Section 3 ====
Round of 32			Round of 16			Quarter-finals
			3	Phil Bottomley (GBR)	4
19	Oguzhan Polat (TUR)	6	19	Oguzhan Polat (TUR)	6
14	Wiktor Patryas (POL)	2				19	Oguzhan Polat (TUR)	3
11	Eric Bennett (USA)	6				11	Eric Bennett (USA)	7
22	Mario Esposito (ITA)	2	11	Eric Bennett (USA)	6
			6	Joel Perrot (FRA)	5

==== Section 4 ====
Round of 32			Round of 16			Quarter-finals
			7	Alexandre Lasvenes (FRA)	3
23	Roman Chayka (UKR)	6	23	Roman Chayka (UKR)	7
10	Li Zongshan (CHN)	4				23	Roman Chayka (UKR)	0
15	Kim Suk Ho (KOR)	6				2	Timur Tuchinov (RUS)	6
18	Amin Alikhani Nezhad (IRI)	2	15	Kim Suk Ho (KOR)	4
			2	Timur Tuchinov (RUS)	6

==== Finals ====
Quarter-finals
17	Zafer Korkmaz (TUR)	4
9	Oleg Shestakov (RUS)	6
5	Mikhail Oyun (RUS)	6
13	Yuriy Kopiy (UKR)	2
19	Oguzhan Polat (TUR)	3
11	Eric Bennett (USA)	7
23	Roman Chayka (UKR)	0
2	Timur Tuchinov (RUS)	6

Semi-finals
9	Oleg Shestakov (RUS)	6
5	Mikhail Oyun (RUS)	2
11	Eric Bennett (USA)	2
2	Timur Tuchinov (RUS)	6

Gold medal match
9	Oleg Shestakov (RUS)	3
2	Timur Tuchinov (RUS)	7
Bronze medal match
5	Mikhail Oyun (RUS)	6
11	Eric Bennett (USA)	0
