= Archery at the 2004 Summer Paralympics – Men's individual W2 =

Men's Individual W2 at the XII Paralympic Games
- Paralympic Archery
- Venue: Olympic Baseball Centre (Athens)
- Dates: 21–25 September
- Competitors: 30 from 18 nations

Medalists
1st place, gold medalist(s)		Mario Oehme	Germany
2nd place, silver medalist(s)		Jung Young Joo	South Korea
3rd place, bronze medalist(s)		Lee Hong Gu	South Korea

The Men's Individual W2 archery competition at the 2004 Summer Paralympics was held from 21 to 25 September at the Olympic Baseball Centre (Athens).

The event was won by Mario Oehme, representing Germany.

== Results ==
=== Ranking Round ===
Rank	Competitor	Points	Notes
1	Lee Hong Gu (KOR)	628	
2	Oscar de Pellegrin (ITA)	626	
3	Mario Oehme (GER)	625	
4	Tseng Lung Hui (TPE)	620	
5	Jung Young Joo (KOR)	619	
6	Muhamad Salam Sidik (MAS)	618	
7	Lee Ouk Soo (KOR)	617	
8	Zhang Nan (CHN)	615	
9	Piotr Sawicki (POL)	614	
10	Andrew Baylis (GBR)	610	
11	Stephane Gilbert (FRA)	602	
12	Alexander Gregory (GBR)	601	
13	Manuel Candela (ESP)	597	
14	Jose Manuel Marin (ESP)	596	
15	Shinji Sakodo (JPN)	595	
16	Kevin Stone (USA)	595	
17	Hermann Nortmann (GER)	593	
18	Satein Peemthong (THA)	590	
19	James Buchanan (GBR)	586	
20	Amit Dror (ISR)	576	
21	Majid Kehtari (IRI)	572	
22	Charles Est (FRA)	572	
23	Wattana Martsuri (THA)	570	
24	Marco Vitale (ITA)	568	
25	Janusz Marian Bulyk (POL)	564	
26	Jose Antonio Baet Tellez (MEX)	564	
27	Roman Hutnyk (UKR)	557	
28	Zulkifli Mat Zin (MAS)	556	
29	Salvatore Carrubba (ITA)	555	
30	Miroslav Kacina (SVK)	547	

=== Competition bracket ===
Round of 32
Hermann Nortmann (GER)	145
Kevin Stone (USA)	147
Piotr Sawicki (POL)	137
Marco Vitale (ITA)	153
Janusz Marian Bulyk (POL)	148
Zhang Nan (CHN)	159
Jung Young Joo (KOR)	159
Zulkifli Mat Zin (MAS)	137
Majid Kehtari (IRI)	135
Alexander Gregory (GBR)	141
Manuel Candela (ESP)	144
Amit Dror (ISR)	141
Salvatore Carrubba (ITA)	126
Tseng Lung Hui (TPE)	155
Mario Oehme (GER)	159
Miroslav Kacina (SVK)	135
James Buchanan (GBR)	131
Jose Manuel Marin (ESP)	140
Stephane Gilbert (FRA)	138
Charles Est (FRA)	139
Roman Hutnyk (UKR)	145
Muhamad Salam Sidik (MAS)	153
Lee Ouk Soo (KOR)	157
Jose Antonio Baet Tellez (MEX)	146
Wattana Martsuri (THA)	140
Andrew Baylis (GBR)	155
Shinji Sakodo (JPN)	145
Satein Peemthong (THA)	144

Round of 16
Lee Hong Gu (KOR)	162
Kevin Stone (USA)	152
Marco Vitale (ITA)	139
Zhang Nan (CHN)	158
Jung Young Joo (KOR)	161
Alexander Gregory (GBR)	149
Manuel Candela (ESP)	150
Tseng Lung Hui (TPE)	152
Mario Oehme (GER)	150
Jose Manuel Marin (ESP)	139
Charles Est (FRA)	149
Muhamad Salam Sidik (MAS)	157
Lee Ouk Soo (KOR)	146
Andrew Baylis (GBR)	141
Shinji Sakodo (JPN)	147
Oscar de Pellegrin (ITA)	151

Quarterfinals
Lee Hong Gu (KOR)	97
Zhang Nan (CHN)	92
Jung Young Joo (KOR)	92
Tseng Lung Hui (TPE)	87
Mario Oehme (GER)^{[1]}	100
Muhamad Salam Sidik (MAS)	100
Lee Ouk Soo (KOR)	91
Oscar de Pellegrin (ITA)	94

Semifinals
Lee Hong Gu (KOR)	95
Jung Young Joo (KOR)	109
Mario Oehme (GER)	98
Oscar de Pellegrin (ITA)	97

Final
Jung Young Joo (KOR)	95
Mario Oehme (GER)	108
Third place
Lee Hong Gu (KOR)	104
Oscar de Pellegrin (ITA)	96

^{[1]} Decided by additional arrows: 8:5
