= Archery at the 2008 Summer Paralympics =

Archery at the XIII Paralympic Games
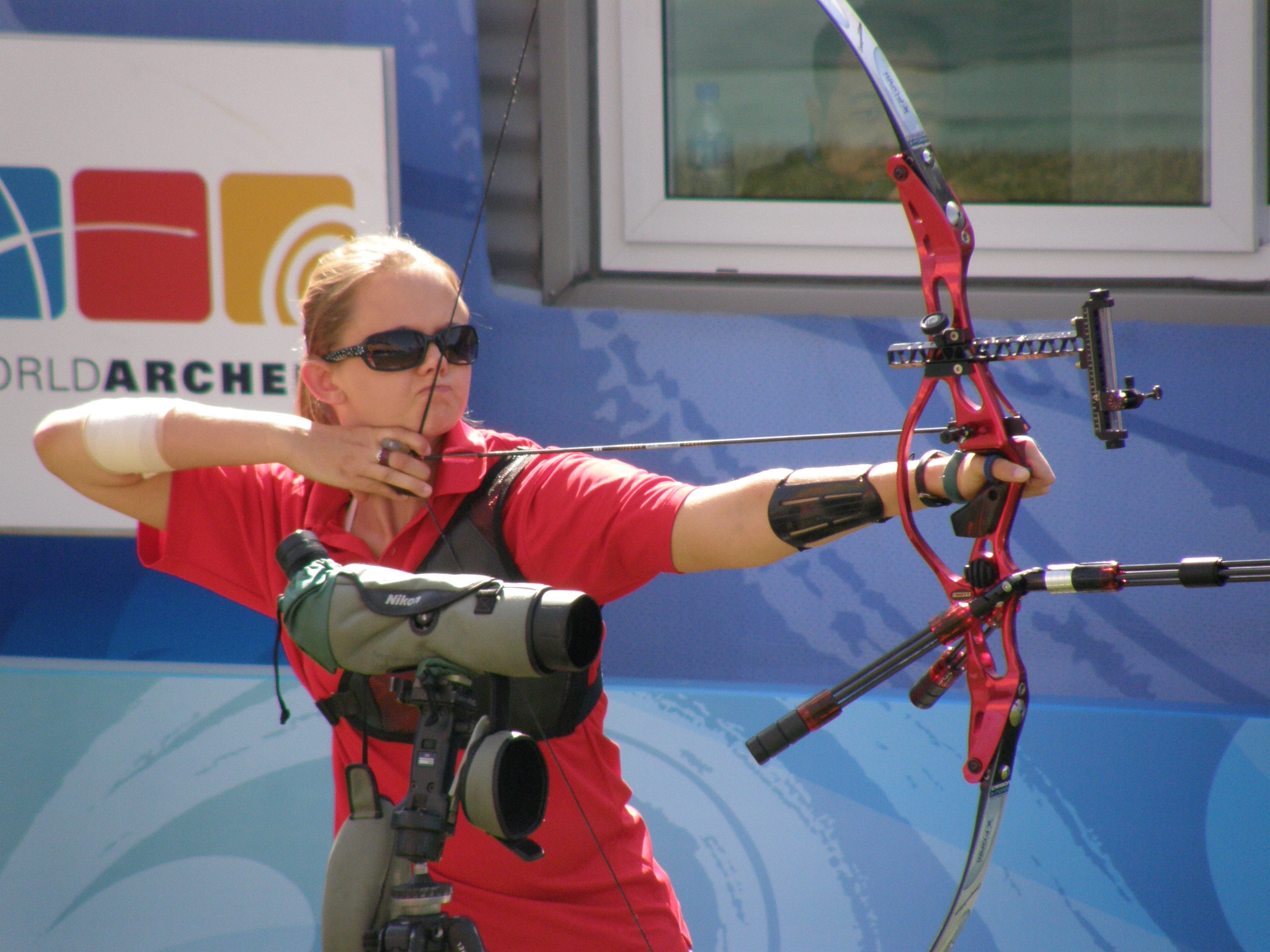
- Lindsey Carmichael
- Venue: Olympic Green Archery Field
- Dates: September 9–15, 2008

Archery at the 2008 Summer Paralympics consists of nine events, five for men and four for women. The competitions were held at the Olympic Green Archery Field from September 9 to September 15, 2008.

== Classification ==
Archers are given a classification depending on the type and extent of their disability. The classification system allows archers to compete against others with a similar level of function.

Archery classes are:

- Wheelchair 1 (W1)
- Wheelchair 2 (W2)
- Standing (ST)

== Events ==
For each of the events below, medals are contested for one or more of the above classifications.

- Men's individual compound
  - Open
  - W1
- Men's individual recurve
  - Standing
  - W1/W2
- Men's team recurve
  - Open
- Women's individual compound
  - Open
- Women's individual recurve
  - Standing
  - W1/W2
- Women's team recurve
  - Open

== Participating countries ==
There were 134 athletes (86 males, 48 females) from 28 countries competing in this sport.

- Canada (3)
- China (11)
- Chinese Taipei (2)
- Czech Republic (6)
- Finland (3)
- France (6)
- Germany (5)
- Great Britain (12)
- Greece (2)
- Ireland (1)
- Israel (1)
- Italy (7)
- Japan (10)
- Malaysia (2)
- Mongolia (2)
- Netherlands (1)
- Norway (1)
- Poland (7)
- Russia (1)
- Slovakia (3)
- South Korea (13)
- Spain (4)
- Sweden (4)
- Switzerland (3)
- Thailand (3)
- Turkey (5)
- Ukraine (8)
- United States (8)

== Medal summary ==
=== Medal table ===
This ranking sorts countries by the number of gold medals earned by their archers (in this context a country is an entity represented by a National Paralympic Committee). The number of silver medals is taken into consideration next and then the number of bronze medals. If, after the above, countries are still tied, equal ranking is given and they are listed alphabetically.

Rank	Nation	Gold	Silver	Bronze	Total
1	China (CHN)	2	3	2	7
2	Great Britain (GBR)	2	1	1	4
3	South Korea (KOR)	2	1	0	3
4	Czech Republic (CZE)	1	0	1	2
5	Mongolia (MGL)	1	0	0	1
5	Turkey (TUR)	1	0	0	1
7	Italy (ITA)	0	2	1	3
8	France (FRA)	0	1	0	1
8	Japan (JPN)	0	1	0	1
10	United States (USA)	0	0	2	2
11	Chinese Taipei (TPE)	0	0	1	1
11	Switzerland (SUI)	0	0	1	1
Totals (12 entries)		9	9	9	27

=== Men's events ===
Event	Class	Gold	Silver	Bronze
Individual compound	open	John Stubbs; Great Britain	Alberto Simonelli; Italy	Philippe Horner; Switzerland
Individual compound	W1	David Drahoninsky; Czech Republic	John Cavanagh; Great Britain	Jeff Fabry; United States
Individual recurve	standing	Baatarjav Dambadondog; Mongolia	Fabrice Meunier; France	Chen Yegang; China
Individual recurve	W1/W2	Cheng Changjie; China	Marco Vitale; Italy	Tseng Lung-Hui; Chinese Taipei
Team recurve	open	South Korea (KOR); Cho Hyun Kwan; Kim Hong Kyu; Lee Hong Gu	China (CHN); Chen Yegang; Cheng Changjie; Dong Zhi	Italy (ITA); Oscar De Pellegrin; Mario Esposito; Marco Vitale

=== Women's events ===
Event	Class	Gold	Silver	Bronze
Individual compound	open	Danielle Brown; Great Britain	Chieko Kamiya; Japan	Mel Clarke; Great Britain
Individual recurve	standing	Lee Hwa-Sook; South Korea	Gao Fangxia; China	Lindsey Carmichael; United States
Individual recurve	W1/W2	Gizem Girişmen; Turkey	Fu Hongzhi; China	Xiao Yanhong; China
Team recurve	open	China (CHN); Fu Hongzhi; Goa Fangxia; Xiao Yanhong	South Korea (KOR); Kim Ki-Hee; Kim Ran-Sook; Lee Hwa-Sook	Czech Republic (CZE); Miroslava Cerna; Lenka Kuncova; Marketa Sidkova

== See also ==
- Archery at the 2008 Summer Olympics
