= Archery at the 2008 Summer Paralympics – Men's team recurve =

The men's team recurve open was one of the events held in archery at the 2008 Summer Paralympics in Beijing. Teams consisted of three archers who had competed in either the Standing or W1/W2 individual events. Team ranking was based on the aggregate individual ranking scores: in the knockout matches each team shot 24 arrows.

== Results ==
Men's team recurve Open at the XIII Paralympic Games
- Paralympic Archery
- Venue: Olympic Green Archery Field
- Dates: 15 September
- Competitors: 10

Medalists
1st place, gold medalist(s)		Cho Hyun Kwan; Kim Hong Kyu; Lee Hong Gu	South Korea
2nd place, silver medalist(s)		Dong Zhi; Cheng Changjie; Chen Yegang	China
3rd place, bronze medalist(s)		Oscar de Pellegrin; Mario Esposito; Marco Vitale	Italy

The event was won by the team representing South Korea.

=== Ranking round ===
Rank	Nation	Archers	Scores	Total	Notes
1	South Korea	Cho Hyun Kwan; Kim Hong Kyu; Lee Hong Gu	625; 632; 629	1886	WR
2	Italy	Oscar de Pellegrin; Mario Esposito; Marco Vitale	629; 631; 624	1884	
3	China	Dong Zhi; Cheng Changjie; Chen Yegang	625; 626; 628	1879	
4	Japan	Takahiro Hasegawa; Tsunehiko Naganuma; Kimimasa Onodera	611; 576; 620	1807	
5	Spain	Manuel Candela; Antonio Sanchez; Juan Miguel Zarzuela	582; 571; 602	1755	
6	Poland	Piotr Sawicki; Ryszard Olejnik; Tomasz Lezanski	593; 550; 596	1739	
7	Thailand	Sakon Inkaew; Sathien Phimthong; Suthi Raksamai	597; 578; 550	1725	
8	Ukraine	Yuriy Kopiy; Taras Chopyk; Serhiy Atamanenko	576; 636; 510	1722	
9	Slovakia	Miroslav Kacina; Imrich Lyocsa; Vladimir Majercak	566; 602; 546	1714	
10	Great Britain	Mick Beard; Paul James Browne; Michael Karaphillides	597; 576; 520	1693	

=== Competition bracket ===
Round of 16
Slovakia	181
Ukraine	185
Thailand	185
Great Britain	158

Quarterfinals
South Korea	188
Ukraine	187
Spain	183
Japan	188
China	202
Poland	191
Thailand	202
Italy	206

Semifinals
South Korea	201
Japan	188
China	208
Italy	201

Final
South Korea	209
China	206
Third place
Japan	194
Italy	207
