= Archery at the 2012 Summer Paralympics – Men's team recurve =

The Men's team recurve was one of the events held in archery at the 2012 Summer Paralympics in London.

== Team recurve ==
Men's team recurve at the XIV Paralympic Games
- Paralympic Archery
- Venue: The Royal Artillery Barracks
- Competitors: 30 from 10 nations

Medalists
1st place, gold medalist(s)		Mikhail Oyun; Oleg Shestakov; Timur Tuchinov	Russia
2nd place, silver medalist(s)		Jung Young Joo; Kim Suk Ho; Lee Myeong-Gu	South Korea
3rd place, bronze medalist(s)		Cheng Changjie; Dong Zhi; Li Zongshan	China

=== Ranking round ===
Rank	Nation	Archers	Score
1	Great Britain (GBR)	Kenny Allen; Phil Bottomley; Paul Browne	1879
2	Russia (RUS)	Mikhail Oyun; Oleg Shestakov; Timur Tuchinov	1869
3	China (CHN)	Cheng Changjie; Dong Zhi; Li Zongshan	1858
4	Iran (IRI)	Amin Alikhani Nezhad; Ebrahim Ranjbarkivaj; Roham Shahabipour	1839
5	South Korea (KOR)	Jung Young Joo; Kim Suk Ho; Lee Myeong-Gu	1811
6	Italy (ITA)	Vittorio Bartoli; Oscar De Pellegrin; Mario Esposito	1778
7	Turkey (TUR)	Zafer Korkmaz; Ozgur Ozen; Oguzhan Polat	1773
8	Chinese Taipei (TPE)	Chung Hua Chen; Tseng Lung Hui; Yang Ching Jen	1768
9	Ukraine (UKR)	Roman Chayka; Taras Chopyk; Yuriy Kopiy	1720
10	Malaysia (MAS)	Mohd Zafi Rahman Mat Saleh; Zulkifli Mat Zin; Hasihin Sanawi	1612

=== Competition bracket ===
Round of 16
8	Chinese Taipei (TPE)	194
9	Ukraine (UKR)	183
7	Turkey (TUR)	197
10	Malaysia (MAS)	190

Quarter-finals
1	Great Britain (GBR)	195
8	Chinese Taipei (TPE)	179
5	South Korea (KOR)	195
4	Iran (IRI)	192
3	China (CHN)	194
6	Italy (ITA)	185
7	Turkey (TUR)	199
2	Russia (RUS)	212

Semi-finals
1	Great Britain (GBR)	190
5	South Korea (KOR)	197
3	China (CHN)	207
2	Russia (RUS)	214

Finals
5	South Korea (KOR)	200
2	Russia (RUS)	206
Third place
1	Great Britain (GBR)	193
3	China (CHN)	206
