= Archery at the 2010 Asian Para Games =

- Location: China

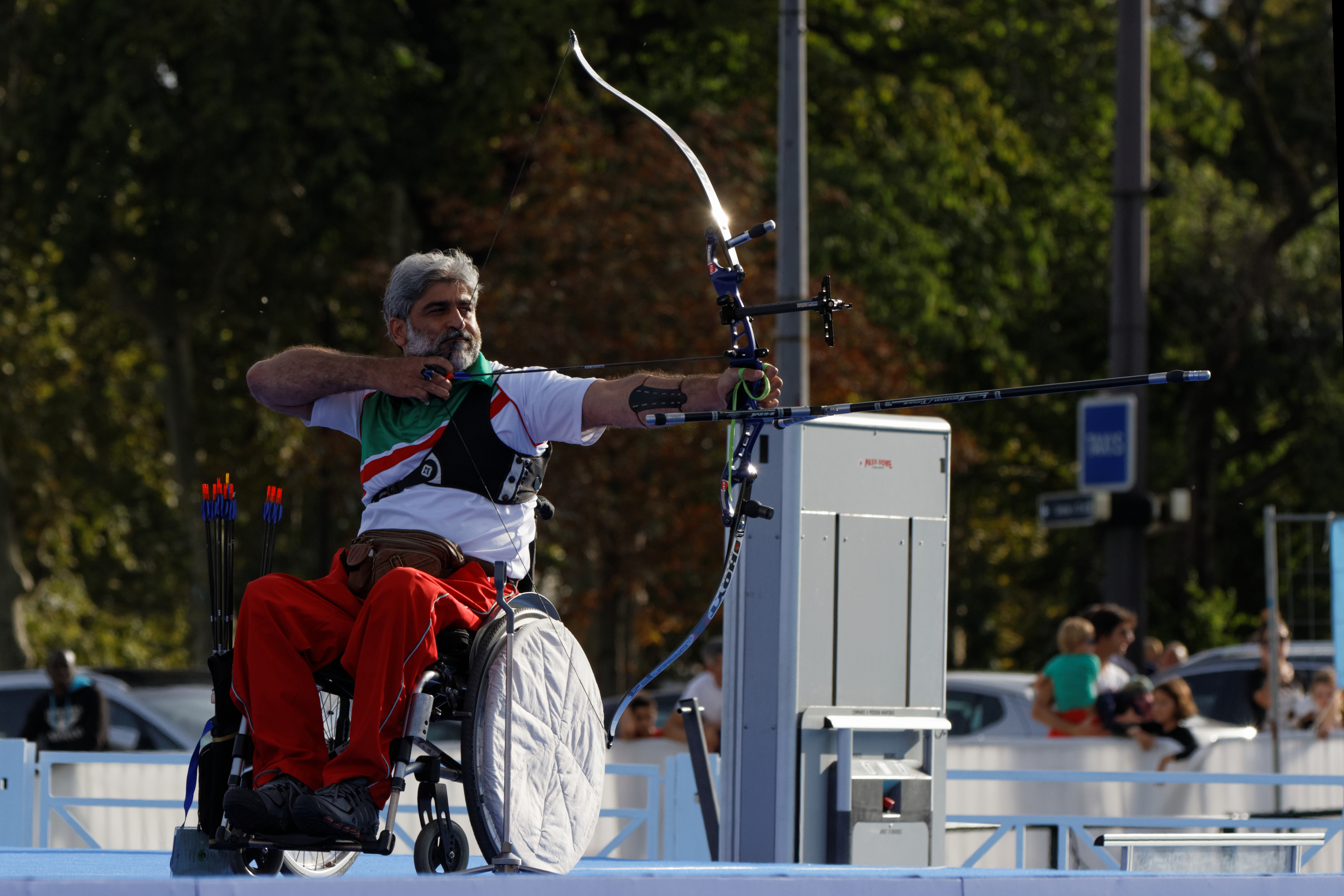
Ebrahim Ranjbar Kivaj (ARW2) in September 2013.

Archery at the 2010 Asian Para Games were held in Aoti Archery Range from December 13 to December 17. There were 9 gold medals in this sport.

== Medal summary ==
=== Medal table ===
| Rank | Nation | Gold | Silver | Bronze | Total |
|---|---|---|---|---|---|
| 1 | South Korea (KOR) | 3 | 3 | 1 | 7 |
| 2 | China (CHN) | 2 | 2 | 2 | 6 |
| 3 | Iran (IRI) | 2 | 1 | 2 | 5 |
| 4 | Japan (JPN) | 2 | 0 | 0 | 2 |
| 5 | Thailand (THA) | 0 | 1 | 0 | 1 |
| 6 | Hong Kong (HKG) | 0 | 0 | 1 | 1 |
| 6 | Malaysia (MAS) | 0 | 0 | 1 | 1 |
| Totals (7 entries) | | 9 | 7 | 7 | 23 |

=== Men's events ===
| Event | Gold | Silver | Bronze |
|---|---|---|---|
| Compound open | Lee Ouk-soo; South Korea | Kweon Hyun-ju; South Korea | Tung Sang Wu; Hong Kong |
| Compound W1 | Shinichi Saito; Japan | | |
| Recurve standing | Dong Zhi; China | Sakon Inkaew; Thailand | Lee Hak-young; South Korea |
| Recurve W1/W2 | Ebrahim Ranjbarkivaj; Iran | Cheng Changjie; China | Roham Shahabipour; Iran |
| Team recurve open | China (CHN); Cheng Changjie; Dong Zhi; Li Zongshan | Iran (IRI); Heshmatollah Kazemirad; Ebrahim Ranjbarkivaj; Roham Shahabipour | Malaysia (MAS); Mohd Zafi Mat Saleh; Zulkifli Mat Zin; Salam Sidik |

=== Women's events ===
| Event | Gold | Silver | Bronze |
|---|---|---|---|
| Compound open | Nagano Miho; Japan | Yu Sun-deok; South Korea | Wang Yanhong; China |
| Recurve standing | Razieh Shir Mohammadi; Iran | Kim Ran-sook; South Korea | Gao Fangxia; China |
| Recurve W1/W2 | Ko Hee-sook; South Korea | Xiao Yanhong; China | Zahra Nemati; Iran |
| Team recurve open | South Korea (KOR); Kim Ran-sook; Ko Hee-sook; Lee Hwa-sook | | |

== Results ==
=== Men ===
==== Individual compound open ====
===== Ranking round =====
December 13

| Seed | Archer | Score |
|---|---|---|
| 1 | Lee Ouk-Soo (KOR) | 682 |
| 2 | Go Sung-Kil (KOR) | 679 |
| 3 | Kwon Hyun-Ju (KOR) | 677 |
| 4 | Hsu Jui-Jen (TPE) | 668 |
| 5 | Zhou Jiao (CHN) | 664 |
| 6 | Shahab Reihani (IRI) | 654 |
| 7 | Wong Siu Wing (HKG) | 649 |
| 8 | Seyed Bassam Tabar (IRI) | 646 |
| 9 | Huang Chuhui (CHN) | 645 |
| 10 | Wu Tung Sang (HKG) | 645 |
| 11 | Ching Wai Hung (HKG) | 644 |
| 12 | Kazumasa Hattori (JPN) | 643 |
| 13 | Hassan Abotalebi (IRI) | 630 |
| 14 | Vilas Dawane (IND) | 569 |

===== Knockout round =====
1/8 eliminations
9 | Huang Chuhui (CHN) | 51 | 54 | 52 | 8
8 | Seyed Tabar (IRI) | 51 | 52 | 55 | 9
5 | Zhou Jiao (CHN) | 52 | 57 | 52 | 9
12 | Kazumasa Hattori (JPN) | 52 | 50 | 54 | 10
13 | Hassan Abotalebi (IRI) | 56 | 54 | 50
4 | Hsu Jui-Jen (TPE) | 55 | 55 | 51
3 | Kwon Hyun-Ju (KOR) | 55 | 54
14 | Vilas Dawane (IND) | 48 | 48
11 | Ching Wai Hung (HKG) | 47 | 54 | 48
6 | Shahab Reihani (IRI) | 56 | 51 | 58
7 | Wong Siu Wing (HKG) | 48 | 54 | 53
10 | Wu Tung Sang (HKG) | 55 | 49 | 54

1/4 eliminations
1 | Lee Ouk-Soo (KOR) | 28 | 27 | 27 | 29 | 29
8 | Seyed Tabar (IRI) | 26 | 28 | 27 | 24 | 27
12 | Kazumasa Hattori (JPN) | 26 | 27 | 27 | 27 | 25 | 9
4 | Hsu Jui-Jen (TPE) | 25 | 27 | 28 | 25 | 27 | 9
3 | Kwon Hyun-Ju (KOR) | 29 | 27 | 27 | 28 | 26
6 | Shahab Reihani (IRI) | 27 | 28 | 27 | 27 | 24
10 | Wu Tung Sang (HKG) | 28 | 28 | 26 | 28 | 28
2 | Go Sung-Kil (KOR) | 28 | 27 | 29 | 25 | 27

Semifinal
1 | Lee Ouk-Soo (KOR) | 29 | 28 | 27 | 30
12 | Kazumasa Hattori (JPN) | 26 | 24 | 28 | 25
3 | Kwon Hyun-Ju (KOR) | 29 | 28 | 28 | 26 | 28
10 | Wu Tung Sang (HKG) | 27 | 27 | 28 | 28 | 24

Gold-medal match
1 | Lee Ouk-Soo (KOR) | 26 | 28 | 26 | 27 | 29
3 | Kwon Hyun-Ju (KOR) | 25 | 29 | 25 | 29 | 28
Bronze-medal match
12 | Kazumasa Hattori (JPN) | 26 | 23 | 21 | 27 | 24 | 7
10 | Wu Tung Sang (HKG) | 25 | 25 | 26 | 26 | 24 | 9

==== Individual compound W1 ====
===== Ranking round =====
December 13

| Seed | Archer | Score |
|---|---|---|
| 1 | Shinichi Saito (JPN) | 588 |
| 2 | Koichi Minami (JPN) | 573 |

===== Final =====
Final – December 16
| | Score | | Game 1 | Game 2 | Game 3 | Game 4 | Game 5 |
|---|---|---|---|---|---|---|---|
| Shinichi Saito (JPN) | 6–4 | Koichi Minami (JPN) | 20–24 | 24–23 | 24–20 | 23–25 | 25–23 |

==== Individual recurve standing ====
===== Ranking round =====
December 13

| Seed | Archer | Score | Seed | Archer | Score | Seed | Archer | Score |
|---|---|---|---|---|---|---|---|---|
| 1 | Dong Zhi (CHN) | 649 | 9 | Kamlesh Kumar Sharma (IND) | 579 | 17 | Jagath Weerathunga (SRI) | 547 |
| 2 | Kim Yong-Ok (KOR) | 634 | 10 | Heshmatollah Kazemi Rad (IRI) | 579 | 18 | Ngai Ka Chuen (HKG) | 534 |
| 3 | Sakon Inkaew (THA) | 632 | 11 | Li Zongshan (CHN) | 577 | 19 | Bandula Serasinghege (SRI) | 532 |
| 4 | Lee Hak-Young (KOR) | 609 | 12 | Yukio Miyamoto (JPN) | 576 | 20 | Mustafa Kazem (IRQ) | 505 |
| 5 | Baatarjav Dambadondog (MGL) | 595 | 13 | Zhu Zhuoli (CHN) | 567 | 21 | Nazri Ariffin (MAS) | 487 |
| 6 | Cho Hyun-Kwan (KOR) | 591 | 14 | Somsak Ruamsab (THA) | 561 | 22 | Olim Sultanov (UZB) | 454 |
| 7 | Kimimasa Onodera (JPN) | 589 | 15 | Ranvir Singh (IND) | 560 | 23 | Fayzulla Shukurov (UZB) | 444 |
| 8 | Luwanglakpa Meitei Salam (IND) | 588 | 16 | Rajeewa Wickramasinghe (SRI) | 558 | 24 | Farkhad Ismailov (UZB) | 286 |

===== Knockout round =====
1/16 eliminations – December 14
| | Score | | Game 1 | Game 2 | Game 3 |
|---|---|---|---|---|---|
| Jagath Weerathunga (SRI) | 0–4 | Rajeewa Wickramasinghe (SRI) | 43–47 | 48–51 | |
| Kamlesh Kumar Sharma (IND) | 4–0 | Farkhad Ismailov (UZB) | 40–26 | 43–34 | |
| Nazri Ariffin (MAS) | 2–4 | Yukio Miyamoto (JPN) | 48–46 | 35–55 | 40–45 |
| Zhu Zhuoli (CHN) | 4–0 | Mustafa Kazem (IRQ) | 48–DNS | 49–DNS | |
| Bandula Serasinghege (SRI) | 4–3 | Somsak Ruamsab (THA) | 48–48 | 49–51 | 55–47; T8–T7 |
| Li Zongshan (CHN) | 4–0 | Olim Sultanov (UZB) | 49–37 | 53–27 | |
| Fayzulla Shukurov (UZB) | 0–4 | Heshmatollah Kazemi Rad (IRI) | 42–49 | 31–49 | |
| Ranvir Singh (IND) | 4–2 | Ngai Ka Chuen (HKG) | 44–50 | 50–47 | 47–42 |

1/8 eliminations - December 14
1 | Dong Zhi (CHN) | 56 | 53
16 | Rajeewa Wickramasinghe (SRI) | 45 | 41
9 | Kamlesh Kumar Sharma (IND) | 49 | 42
8 | Luwanglakpa Meitei Salam (IND) | 51 | 57
5 | Baatarjav Dambadondog (MGL) | 43 | 45 | 49
12 | Yukio Miyamoto (JPN) | 40 | 47 | 46
13 | Zhu Zhuoli (CHN) | 40 | 49 | 40
4 | Lee Hak-Young (KOR) | 47 | 48 | 41
3 | Sakon Inkaew (THA) | 52 | 53
19 | Bandula Serasinghege (SRI) | 38 | 51
11 | Li Zongshan (CHN) | 44 | 46
6 | Cho Hyun-Kwan (KOR) | 50 | 47
7 | Kimimasa Onodera (JPN) | 54 | 52
10 | Heshmatollah Kazemi Rad (IRI) | 44 | 49
15 | Ranvir Singh (IND) | 51 | 44
2 | Kim Yong-Ok (KOR) | 56 | 50

Quarterfinals - December 14
1 | Dong Zhi (CHN) | 26 | 27 | 28 | 28
8 | Luwanglakpa Meitei Salam (IND) | 28 | 22 | 26 | 26
5 | Baatarjav Dambadondog (MGL) | 22 | 21 | 27 | 22
4 | Lee Hak-Young (KOR) | 26 | 24 | 25 | 29
3 | Sakon Inkaew (THA) | 24 | 26 | 28
6 | Cho Hyun-Kwan (KOR) | 22 | 24 | 27
7 | Kimimasa Onodera (JPN) | 25 | 22 | 26 | 28
2 | Kim Yong-Ok (KOR) | 23 | 26 | 21 | 27

Semifinals - December 15
1 | Dong Zhi (CHN) | 29 | 29 | 28
4 | Lee Hak-Young (KOR) | 27 | 23 | 23
3 | Sakon Inkaew (THA) | 28 | 26 | 23 | 29
7 | Kimimasa Onodera (JPN) | 26 | 27 | 22 | 25

Gold-medal match - December 16
1 | Dong Zhi (CHN) | 23 | 23 | 25 | 23
3 | Sakon Inkaew (THA) | 22 | 18 | 26 | 17
Third place
4 | Lee Hak-Young (KOR) | 24 | 22 | 24 | 26
7 | Kimimasa Onodera (JPN) | 24 | 18 | 23 | 26

==== Individual recurve W1/W2 ====
===== Ranking round =====
December 13

| Seed | Archer | Score | Seed | Archer | Score | Seed | Archer | Score |
|---|---|---|---|---|---|---|---|---|
| 1 | Tseng Lung Hui (TPE) | 647 | 8 | Zulkifli Mat Zin (MAS) | 606 | 14 | Amol Bhagwansa Boriwale (IND) | 573 |
| 2 | Jung Young-Joo (KOR) | 638 | 9 | Lee Hong-Gu (KOR) | 606 | 15 | Sathien Phimthong (THA) | 572 |
| 3 | Cheng Changjie (CHN) | 625 | 10 | Roham Shahabipour (IRI) | 605 | 16 | Chen Hsin Yao (TPE) | 534 |
| 4 | Ebrahim Ranjbarkivaj (IRI) | 620 | 11 | Cui Jihai (CHN) | 593 | 17 | Suthi Raksamai (THA) | 530 |
| 5 | Salam Sidik (MAS) | 616 | 12 | Tomonobu Fuchigami (JPN) | 588 | 18 | Gao Pan (CHN) | 516 |
| 6 | Chung Hua Chen (TPE) | 616 | 13 | Kim Hong-Kyu (KOR) | 583 | 19 | Wattana Martsuri (THA) | 498 |
| 7 | Mohd Zafi Mat Saleh (MAS) | 613 | | | | | | |

===== Knockout round =====
1/16 eliminations – December 14
| | Score | | Game 1 | Game 2 | Game 3 |
|---|---|---|---|---|---|
| Suthi Raksamai (THA) | 3–4 | Chen Hsin Yao (TPE) | 52–44 | 46–46 | 48–50; T6–T7 |
| Wattana Martsuri (THA) | 0–4 | Amol Bhagwansa Boriwale (IND) | 39–52 | 20–48 | |
| Sathien Phimthong (THA) | 4–2 | Gao Pan (CHN) | 37–38 | 43–41 | 44–39 |

1/8 eliminations - December 14
1 | Tseng Lung Hui (TPE) | 45 | 49 | 49
16 | Chen Hsin Yao (TPE) | 48 | 38 | 42
9 | Lee Hong-Gu (KOR) | 51 | 53
8 | Zulkifli Mat Zin (MAS) | 42 | 39
5 | Salam Sidik (MAS) | 47 | 53
12 | Tomonobu Fuchigami (JPN) | 49 | 49
13 | Kim Hong-Kyu (KOR) | 46 | 47
4 | Ebrahim Ranjbarkivaj (IRI) | 50 | 54
3 | Cheng Changjie (CHN) | 49 | 50
14 | Amol Bhagwansa Boriwale (IND) | 35 | 43
11 | Cui Jihai (CHN) | 47 | 51 | 46 | 6
6 | Chung Hua Chen (TPE) | 43 | 51 | 50 | 9
7 | Mohd Zafi Mat Saleh (MAS) | 48 | 50
10 | Roham Shahabipour (IRI) | 53 | 54
15 | Sathien Phimthong (THA) | 37 | 41
2 | Jung Young-Joo (KOR) | 53 | 55

Quarterfinals - December 14
1 | Tseng Lung Hui (TPE) | 23 | 26 | 26 | 25 | 28 | 9
9 | Lee Hong-Gu (KOR) | 27 | 26 | 25 | 26 | 24 | 9
5 | Salam Sidik (MAS) | 24 | 24 | 20 | 27 | 21
4 | Ebrahim Ranjbarkivaj (IRI) | 20 | 26 | 26 | 26 | 25
3 | Cheng Changjie (CHN) | 26 | 24 | 28 | 25 | 25
6 | Chung Hua Chen (TPE) | 24 | 26 | 26 | 26 | 21
10 | Roham Shahabipour (IRI) | 27 | 26 | 24 | 24 | 27
2 | Jung Young-Joo (KOR) | 26 | 27 | 27 | 22 | 26

Semifinals - December 15
9 | Lee Hong-Gu (KOR) | 26 | 30 | 26 | 18 | 28
4 | Ebrahim Ranjbarkivaj (IRI) | 27 | 27 | 26 | 24 | 29
3 | Cheng Changjie (CHN) | 28 | 26 | 28
10 | Roham Shahabipour (IRI) | 26 | 23 | 23

Gold-medal match - December 16
4 | Ebrahim Ranjbarkivaj (IRI) | 23 | 24 | 25 | 27 | 22
3 | Cheng Changjie (CHN) | 26 | 21 | 22 | 27 | 21
Third place
9 | Lee Hong-Gu (KOR) | 26 | 22 | 19 | 22 | 16
10 | Roham Shahabipour (IRI) | 25 | 21 | 26 | 24 | 26

==== Team recurve open ====
===== Ranking round =====
December 13

| Seed | Archer | Score | Seed | Archer | Score |
|---|---|---|---|---|---|
| 1 | China (CHN); Cheng Changjie; Dong Zhi; Li Zongshan | 1851 | 6 | Japan (JPN); Tomonobu Fuchigami; Yukio Miyamoto; Kimimasa Onodera | 1753 |
| 2 | Malaysia (MAS); Mohd Zafi Mat Saleh; Zulkifli Mat Zin; Salam Sidik | 1835 | 7 | India (IND); Kamlesh Kumar Sharma; Luwanglakpa Meitei Salam; Ranvir Singh | 1727 |
| 3 | Iran (IRI); Heshmatollah Kazemmi Rad; Ebrahim Ranjbarkivaj; Roham Shahabipour | 1804 | 8 | Thailand (THA); Sakon Inkaew; Suthi Raksamai; Somsak Ruamsab | 1723 |
| 4 | Chinese Taipei (TPE); Chen Hsin Yao; Chung Hua Chen; Tseng Lung Hui | 1797 | 9 | Sri Lanka (SRI); Bandula Serasinghege; Jagath Weerathunga; Rajeewa Wickramasinghe | 1637 |
| 5 | South Korea (KOR); Cho Hyun-Kwan; Kim Hong-Kyu; Lee Hong-Gu | 1780 | 10 | Uzbekistan (UZB); Farkhad Ismailov; Fayzulla Shukurov; Olim Sultanov | 1184 |

===== Knockout round =====
1/8 eliminations - December 17
9 | Sri Lanka (SRI) | 154
8 | Thailand (THA) | 194
7 | India (IND) | 168
10 | Uzbekistan (UZB) | 144

Quarterfinals - December 17
1 | China (CHN) | 200
8 | Thailand (THA) | 178
5 | South Korea (KOR) | 196
4 | Chinese Taipei (TPE) | 183
3 | Iran (IRI) | 191
6 | Japan (JPN) | 175
7 | India (IND) | 173
2 | Malaysia (MAS) | 178

Semifinals - December 17
1 | China (CHN) | 200
5 | South Korea (KOR) | 192
3 | Iran (IRI) | 189
2 | Malaysia (MAS) | 188

Gold-medal match - December 17
1 | China (CHN) | 203
3 | Iran (IRI) | 184
Third place
5 | South Korea (KOR) | 195
2 | Malaysia (MAS) | 199

=== Women ===
==== Individual compound open ====
===== Ranking round =====
December 13

| Seed | Archer | Score | Seed | Archer | Score |
|---|---|---|---|---|---|
| 1 | Zeng Dongdi (CHN) | 653 | 5 | Chieko Kamiya (JPN) | 622 |
| 2 | Wang Yanhong (CHN) | 645 | 6 | Nafiseh Ahmadi (IRI) | 612 |
| 3 | Miho Nagano (JPN) | 631 | 7 | Yoshimi Kawasaki (JPN) | 612 |
| 4 | Choi Yuen Lung (HKG) | 626 | 8 | Yu Sun-Deok (KOR) | 605 |

===== Knockout round =====
Quarterfinals - December 14
1 | Zeng Dongdi (CHN) | 26 | 27 | 28 | 27 | 25-T8
8 | Yu Sun-Deok (KOR) | 27 | 27 | 24 | 25 | 26-T9
5 | Chieko Kamiya (JPN) | 26 | 28 | 25 | 23 | 24
4 | Choi Yuen Lung (HKG) | 28 | 22 | 23 | 26 | 26
3 | Miho Nagano (JPN) | 27 | 26 | 28 | 24
6 | Nafiseh Ahmadi (IRI) | 25 | 28 | 25 | 22
7 | Yoshimi Kawasaki (JPN) | 26 | 29 | 24 | 26
2 | Wang Yanhong (CHN) | 28 | 26 | 29 | 28

Semifinals - December 15
8 | Yu Sun-Deok (KOR) | 27 | 27 | 22
4 | Choi Yuen Lung (HKG) | 22 | 21 | 21
3 | Miho Nagano (JPN) | 26 | 27 | 27 | 29
2 | Wang Yanhong (CHN) | 27 | 25 | 24 | 28

Gold-medal match - December 16
8 | Yu Sun-Deok (KOR) | 26 | 24 | 21 | 26
3 | Miho Nagano (JPN) | 26 | 25 | 24 | 27
Third place
4 | Choi Yuen Lung (HKG) | 22 | 23 | 18 | 22
2 | Wang Yanhong (CHN) | 22 | 24 | 28 | 26

==== Individual recurve standing ====
===== Ranking round =====
December 13

| Seed | Archer | Score | Seed | Archer | Score | Seed | Archer | Score |
|---|---|---|---|---|---|---|---|---|
| 1 | Gao Fangxia (CHN) | 641 WR | 5 | Oyun-Erdene Buyanjargal (MGL) | 590 | 9 | Wasana Khuthawisap (THA) | 542 |
| 2 | Lee Hwa-Sook (KOR) | 607 | 6 | Razieh Shir Mohammadi (IRI) | 581 | 10 | Yae Yamakawa (JPN) | 482 |
| 3 | Yan Huilian (CHN) | 597 | 7 | Javzmaa Byambasuren (MGL) | 578 | 11 | Wen Liyuan (CHN) | 466 |
| 4 | Kim Ran-Sook (KOR) | 595 | 8 | Kim Ki-Hee (KOR) | 560 | 12 | Lai Wai Chi Polly (HKG) | 384 |

===== Knockout round =====
1/8 eliminations - December 14
1 | Gao Fangxia (CHN)
Bye
9 | Wasana Khuthawisap (THA) | 46 | 45 | 46
8 | Kim Ki-Hee (KOR) | 43 | 45 | 36
5 | Oyun-Erdene Buyanjargal (MGL) | 50 | 52
12 | Lai Wai Chi Polly (HKG) | 41 | 45
Bye
4 | Kim Ran-Sook (KOR)
3 | Yan Huilian (CHN)
Bye
11 | Wen Liyuan (CHN) | 39 | 44
6 | Razieh Shir Mohammadi (IRI) | 43 | 51
7 | Javzmaa Byambasuren (MGL) | 48 | 53
10 | Yae Yamakawa (JPN) | 34 | 29
Bye
2 | Lee Hwa-Sook (KOR)

1/4 eliminations - December 14
1 | Gao Fangxia (CHN) | 24 | 23 | 27
9 | Wasana Khuthawisap (THA) | 22 | 18 | 21
5 | Oyun-Erdene Buyanjargal (MGL) | 16 | 21 | 11 | 23 | 22 | 5
4 | Kim Ran-Sook (KOR) | 26 | 18 | 23 | 22 | 22 | 8
3 | Yan Huilian (CHN) | 22 | 20 | 17 | 21
6 | Razieh Shir Mohammadi (IRI) | 18 | 27 | 20 | 25
7 | Javzmaa Byambasuren (MGL) | 22 | 18 | 24 | 24
2 | Lee Hwa-Sook (KOR) | 24 | 25 | 24 | 24

Semifinal - December 15
1 | Gao Fangxia (CHN) | 20 | 24 | 22
4 | Kim Ran-Sook (KOR) | 25 | 26 | 26
6 | Razieh Shir Mohammadi (IRI) | 26 | 20 | 25 | 23 | 26 | 10
2 | Lee Hwa-Sook (KOR) | 26 | 28 | 25 | 23 | 24 | 8

Gold-medal match - December 16
4 | Kim Ran-Sook (KOR) | 27 | 20 | 21 | 23
6 | Razieh Shir Mohammadi (IRI) | 21 | 23 | 25 | 24
Third place
1 | Gao Fangxia (CHN) | 28 | 21 | 25 | 23 | 23
2 | Lee Hwa-Sook (KOR) | 23 | 25 | 17 | 24 | 20

==== Individual recurve W1/W2 ====
===== Ranking round =====
December 13

| Seed | Archer | Score | Seed | Archer | Score |
|---|---|---|---|---|---|
| 1 | Ko Hee-Sook (KOR) | 609 | 5 | Aya Nakanishi (JPN) | 565 |
| 2 | Zahra Nemati (IRI) | 593 | 6 | Li Jinzhi (CHN) | 551 |
| 3 | Xiao Yanhong (CHN) | 593 | 7 | Saadah Abd Wahab (MAS) | 495 |
| 4 | Yuan Lulu (CHN) | 568 | 8 | Choi Na-Mi (KOR) | 456 |

===== Knockout round =====
Quarterfinals - December 14
1 | Ko Hee-Sook (KOR) | 25 | 20 | 25
8 | Choi Na-Mi (KOR) | 13 | 15 | 16
5 | Aya Nakanishi (JPN) | 16 | 16 | 16
4 | Yuan Lulu (CHN) | 20 | 24 | 19
3 | Xiao Yanhong (CHN) | 21 | 24 | 23 | 21 | 20-T8
6 | Li Jinzhi (CHN) | 17 | 27 | 21 | 27 | 20-T8
7 | Saadah Abd Wahab (MAS) | 26 | 16 | 22 | 22
2 | Zahra Nemati (IRI) | 25 | 25 | 24 | 26

Semifinals - December 15
1 | Ko Hee-Sook (KOR) | 29 | 27 | 22
4 | Yuan Lulu (CHN) | 21 | 26 | 21
3 | Xiao Yanhong (CHN) | 22 | 24 | 26 | 26
2 | Zahra Nemati (IRI) | 19 | 24 | 25 | 25

Gold-medal match - December 16
1 | Ko Hee-Sook (KOR) | 24 | 21 | 25 | 26 | 24
3 | Xiao Yanhong (CHN) | 22 | 22 | 25 | 24 | 21
Third place
4 | Yuan Lulu (CHN) | 23 | 15 | 24 | 20 | 22
2 | Zahra Nemati (IRI) | 21 | 22 | 21 | 23 | 26

==== Team recurve open ====
===== Ranking round =====
December 13

| Seed | Archer | Score |
|---|---|---|
| 1 | South Korea (KOR); Kim Ran-Sook; Ko Hee-Sook; Lee Hwa-Sook | 1811 WR |
| 2 | China (CHN); Gao Fangxia; Li Jinzhi; Yan Huilian | 1789 |

===== Knockout round =====
| Gold-medal match - December 17 |
| 1 | South Korea (KOR) | 195 |
| 2 | China (CHN) | 190 |

== See also ==
- Asian Para Games - Archery
