= Archery at the 2000 Summer Paralympics – Men's individual standing =

Men's individual standing at the XI Paralympic Games
- Venue: Sydney, Australia
- Dates: 20 to 25 October 2000
- Competitors: 24 from 15 nations

Medalists
1st place, gold medalist(s)		An Tae Sung	South Korea
2nd place, silver medalist(s)		Serhiy Atamanenko	Ukraine
3rd place, bronze medalist(s)		Imrich Lyocsa	Slovakia

The men's individual standing archery event at the 2000 Summer Paralympics was held from 20 to 25 October 2000 in Sydney, Australia.

== Ranking round ==
Rank	Competitor	Points	Notes
1	Serhiy Atamanenko (UKR)	617	
2	Cho Hyun Kwan (KOR)	616	
3	An Tae Sung (KOR)	611	
4	Vladimir Majercak (SVK)	594	
5	Tomasz Lezanski (POL)	592	
6	Ryszard Bukanski (POL)	590	
7	Imrich Lyocsa (SVK)	590	
8	Jean-François Garcia (FRA)	588	
9	Raimo Tirronen (FIN)	585	
10	Lee Hak Young (KOR)	583	
11	Baatarjav Dambadondog (MGL)	575	
12	Wanchai Chaivarin (THA)	562	
13	Tony Marturano (AUS)	560	
14	Kenichi Nishii (JPN)	557	
15	Jose Luis Gaspar (ESP)	557	
16	Heshmatollah Kazemi Rad (IRI)	549	
17	Felix Marquez (ESP)	548	
18	Reiner Schmidt (GER)	548	
19	Marek Kantczak (POL)	548	
20	Mario Esposito (ITA)	543	
21	Akira Haraguchi (JPN)	539	
22	Sawai Padpong (THA)	526	
23	Juergen Diederich (GER)	526	
24	Erich Prossliner (AUT)	478	

== Competition bracket ==
Round of 32
H Kazemi Rad (IRI)	141
Felix Marquez (ESP)	125
Erich Prossliner (AUT)	127
Raimo Tirronen (FIN)	147
Akira Haraguchi (JPN)	133
Wanchai Chaivarin (THA)	135
Mario Esposito (ITA)	141
Tony Marturano (AUS)	138
Marek Kantczak (POL)	135
Kenichi Nishii (JPN)	140
Sawai Padpong (THA)	138 (4)
Baatarjav Dambadondog (MGL)	138 (8)
Juergen Diederich (GER)	140
Lee Hak Young (KOR)	137
Reiner Schmidt (GER)	136
Jose Luis Gaspar (ESP)	145

Round of 16
H Kazemi Rad (IRI)	148
Serhiy Atamanenko (UKR)	156
Jean-Francois Garcia (FRA)	158
Raimo Tirronen (FIN)	156
Tomasz Lezanski (POL)	149
Wanchai Chaivarin (THA)	152
Vladimir Majercak (SVK)	149 (7)
Mario Esposito (ITA)	149 (9)
An Tae Sung (KOR)	155
Kenichi Nishii (JPN)	143
Ryszard Bukanski (POL)	146
Baatarjav Dambadondog (MGL)	149
Imrich Lyocsa (SVK)	145
Juergen Diederich (GER)	131
Cho Hyun Kwan (KOR)	154
Jose Luis Gaspar (ESP)	156

Quarterfinals
Serhiy Atamanenko (UKR)	101
Jean-Francois Garcia (FRA)	94
Wanchai Chaivarin (THA)	93
Mario Esposito (ITA)	95
An Tae Sung (KOR)	102
Baatarjav Dambadondog (MGL)	94
Imrich Lyocsa (SVK)	99
Jose Luis Gaspar (ESP)	89

Semifinals
Serhiy Atamanenko (UKR)	107
Mario Esposito (ITA)	93
An Tae Sung (KOR)	106
Imrich Lyocsa (SVK)	87

Final
Serhiy Atamanenko (UKR)	100
An Tae Sung (KOR)	108
Third place
Mario Esposito (ITA)	97
Imrich Lyocsa (SVK)	100
