= Mongolia at the 2008 Summer Paralympics =

- IPC code: MGL
- NPC: Mongolian Paralympic Committee

in Beijing
- Competitors: 4 in 3 sports
- Medals Ranked 52nd: Gold 1 Silver 0 Bronze 0 Total 1

Summer Paralympics appearances (overview)
- 2000; 2004; 2008; 2012; 2016; 2020; 2024

Mongolia sent 6 athletes to compete at the 2008 Summer Paralympics in Beijing, People's Republic of China.

== Medalists ==
The country won one medal, a gold. It was Mongolia's first ever Paralympic medal.

Medal	Name	Sport	Event
Gold	Dambadondogiin Baatarjav	Archery	Men's individual recurve standing

== Sports ==
=== Archery ===
==== Men ====
Athlete	Event	Ranking round		Round of 32	Round of 16	Quarterfinals	Semifinals	Finals	
Athlete	Event	Score	Seed	Opposition score	Opposition score	Opposition score	Opposition score	Opposition score	Rank
Dambadondogiin Baatarjav	Men's individual recurve standing	618	6	Bye	Beard (GBR); W 104-91	Dong Z (CHN); W 106-104	Chen Y (CHN); W 105-98	Meunier (FRA); W 94-90	1st place, gold medalist(s)

==== Women ====
Athlete	Event	Ranking round		Round of 32	Round of 16	Quarterfinals	Semifinals	Finals	
Athlete	Event	Score	Seed	Opposition score	Opposition score	Opposition score	Opposition score	Opposition score	Rank
Byambasuren Javzmaa	Women's individual recurve standing	563	7	Bye	Tzika (GRE); L 85-90	Did not advance			

=== Judo ===
Athlete	Event	First round	Quarterfinals	Semifinals	Repechage round 1	Repechage round 2	Final/ Bronze medal contest	Rank
Athlete	Event	Opposition Result	Opposition Result	Opposition Result	Opposition Result	Opposition Result	Opposition Result	Opposition Result
Khashtsetseg Batsukh	Women's 63kg	Bye	Kivi (SWE); L 0010–1000	Did not advance	Bye	Zhou Q (CHN); L 0000-1000	Did not advance	7

=== Shooting ===
Athlete	Event	Qualification		Final		
Athlete	Event	Score	Rank	Score	Total	Rank
Nasanbat Yadamsuren	Women's 10m air pistol SH1	341	16	Did not advance		

== See also ==
- Mongolia at the Paralympics
- Mongolia at the 2008 Summer Olympics
