= Paul Browne (archer) =

English archer

Paul James Browne (born 11 April 1961) is an English competitive archer. Browne has competed in two Summer Paralympic Games.

== Personal life ==
Browne, who was born with the joint disease arthrogryposis, requires the use of a wheelchair to compete. Without the assistance of sticks, he is unable to walk. He holds a BTEC qualification in Business Studies and Finance.

== Archery ==
Due to his disability, Browne competes in the W2 classification. He is a member of the Hertford Company of Archers. He is righthanded and uses arrows that are 29.25 inches (74.3 cm) long and a draw weight of 42 pounds (19 kg).

Browne made his Paralympic debut at the 2008 Summer Games held in Beijing, China. In the individual recurve he placed nineteenth in the ranking round and progressed as far as the quarterfinals, losing to Lee Hong-gu of South Korea. In the team recurve he was part of the Great Britain team, along with Mick Beard and Michael Karaphillides, which qualified tenth and lost in the first round of competition to Thailand.

At the 2010 European Para-Archery Championships, held in Vichy, France Browne became European champion in the men's individual recurve W2 and also won a silver medal in the team event. In 2011, he was part of teams that finished fourth in the men's recurve competition and seventh in the mixed recurve at the 2011 World Championships, in Turin, Italy.

At the 2012 Summer Paralympics in London, United Kingdom, he finished ninth in the individual recurve, after reaching the quarterfinals and being defeated by the top ranked archer Tseng Lung Hui of Chinese Taipei. He also finished fourth in the team recurve as part of the Great Britain team alongside Kenny Allen and Phil Bottomley, losing to South Korea in the semifinals and China in the bronze medal match.

He competed at the 2015 World Championships in Donaueschingen, Germany, reaching the third round of the individual recurve and the quarterfinals of the team event.
