= Mongolia at the Paralympics =

- IPC code: MGL
- NPC: Mongolian Paralympic Committee
- Medals Ranked 88th: Gold 3 Silver 3 Bronze 2 Total 8

Summer appearances
- 2000; 2004; 2008; 2012; 2016; 2020; 2024

Winter appearances
- 2006; 2010; 2014; 2018; 2022; 2026

Mongolia first competed at the Summer Paralympic Games in 2000, and has competed in every edition of the Summer Paralympics since then. The country first participated at the Winter Paralympic Games in 2006.

Mongolia's first Paralympic medal came in 2008, when Dambadondogiin Baatarjav took gold in the men's archery, in the recurve standing event.

== Medal tallies ==
=== Summer Paralympics ===
Event	Gold	Silver	Bronze	Total	Ranking
2000 Summer Paralympics	0	0	0	0	—
2004 Summer Paralympics	0	0	0	0	—
2008 Summer Paralympics	1	0	0	1	52nd
2012 Summer Paralympics	0	0	0	0	—
2016 Summer Paralympics	0	0	2	2	75th
2020 Summer Paralympics	1	0	0	1	59th
2024 Summer Paralympics	1	3	0	4	57th
Total	3	3	2	8	88th

=== Medals by Summer sport ===
Sport	Gold	Silver	Bronze	Total
Powerlifting	1	1	1	3
Taekwondo	1	1	0	2
Archery	1	0	0	1
Athletics	0	1	0	1
Judo	0	0	1	1
Totals (5 entries)	3	3	2	8

== List of medalists ==
Medal	Name	Games	Sport	Event
Gold	Dambadondogiin Baatarjav	(China) 2008 Beijing	Archery	Men's Individual recurve standing
Bronze	Bolormaagiin Uugankhuu	(Brazil) 2016 Rio de Janeiro	Judo	Men's 60 kg
Bronze	Enkhbayariin Sodnompiljee	(Brazil) 2016 Rio de Janeiro	Powerlifting	Men's -88 kg
Gold	Enkhbayariin Sodnompiljee	(Japan) 2020 Tokyo	Powerlifting	Men's 107 kg
Gold	Ulambayaryn Sürenjav	(France) 2024 Paris	Taekwondo	F44 Women’s 52 kg
Silver	Ganbatyn Bolor-Erdene	(France) 2024 Paris	Taekwondo	F44 Men’s 63 kg
Silver	Battulga Tsegmid	(France) 2024 Paris	Para Athletics	Men’s shot put F40
Silver	Enkhbayaryn Sodnompiljee	(France) 2024 Paris	Powerlifting	Men's -107kg

== See also ==
- Mongolia at the Olympics
