= Mongolian Paralympic Committee =

National Paralympic Committee of Mongolia

National Paralympic Committee
- Country: Mongolia
- Code: MGL
- Created: 1995
- Recognized: 2000
- Continental association: APC

The Mongolian Paralympic Committee (Mongolian: Монголын Паралимпийн холбоо) is the National Paralympic Committee in Mongolia for the Paralympic Games movement.

== History ==
The non-governmental "Disabled Persons' Physical Education and Sports Association" (Mongolian: Тахир дутуу хүмүүсийн Биеийн тамир, спортын холбоо) was first established in 1989, paving the way for the formation of the Mongolian Paralympic Committee in 1995. The committee was accepted as a member of the International Paralympic Committee in 2000.

Mongolia first competed at the 2000 Summer Paralympics, sending two competitors. The Winter Paralympics debut came in 2006, with one competitor in Nordic skiing.

Archer Dambadondogiin Baatarjav became Mongolia's first Paralympics medalist in 2008, winning gold in the Men's individual recurve event. Baatarjav's success has been commemorated as "Mongolian National Paralympics Day" since then, on 14 September.

The 2024 Paris Games are Mongolia's most successful Paralympics to date, with 3 medals as of 2 September 2024, which included Mongolia's first female Paralympic medalist Ulambayaryn Sürenjav.

== See also ==
- Mongolia at the Paralympics
