= Mongolia at the 2026 Winter Paralympics =

- Flag of Mongolia
- IPC code: MGL
- NPC: Mongolian Paralympic Committee

in Milan & Cortina d'Ampezzo, Italy 6 March 2026 – 15 March 2026
- Competitors: 3 (3 men) in 2 sports
- Flag bearer (opening): Tsegmidiin Dashdorj
- Flag bearer (closing): Tsegmidiin Dashdorj
- Medals: Gold 0 Silver 0 Bronze 0 Total 0

Winter Paralympics appearances (overview)
- 2006; 2010; 2014; 2018; 2022; 2026

Mongolia will compete at the 2026 Winter Paralympics in Milan & Cortina d'Ampezzo, Italy, which will take place between 6–15 March 2026.

== Competitors ==
The following is the list of number of competitors participating at the Games per sport/discipline.

Sport	Men	Women	Total
Para alpine skiing	1	0	1
Para cross-country skiing	2	0	2
Total	3	0	3

== Para alpine skiing ==
Athlete	Class	Event	Run 1		Run 2		Total	
Athlete	Class	Event	Time	Rank	Time	Rank	Time	Rank
Byambadorjiin Tserenpuntsag	LW6/8–1	Men's giant slalom, standing	1:36.72	33	1:34.29	29	3:11.01	30
Byambadorjiin Tserenpuntsag	LW6/8–1	Men's slalom, standing	DNF					

== Para cross-country skiing ==
Men

Athlete	Class	Event	Qualification		Semifinal		Final	
Athlete	Class	Event	Time	Rank	Time	Rank	Time	Rank
Batmönkhiin Ganbold	LW6	Men's sprint classical, standing	2:44.63	16	Did not advance			
Batmönkhiin Ganbold	LW6	Men's 10 km classical, standing	—N/a				34:40.8	21
Batmönkhiin Ganbold	LW6	Men's 20 km freestyle, standing	—N/a				55:09.3	28
Tsegmidiin Dashdorj	LW8	Men's sprint classical, standing	2:51.78	22	Did not advance			
Tsegmidiin Dashdorj	LW8	Men's 10 km classical, standing	—N/a				34:49.0	22
Tsegmidiin Dashdorj	LW8	Men's 20 km freestyle, standing	—N/a				53:11.0	26

== See also ==
- Mongolia at the Paralympics
- Mongolia at the 2026 Winter Olympics
