= Mongolia at the 2016 Summer Paralympics =

- IPC code: MGL
- NPC: Mongolian Paralympic Committee

in Rio de Janeiro
- Competitors: 8 in 5 sports
- Medals Ranked 75th: Gold 0 Silver 0 Bronze 2 Total 2

Summer Paralympics appearances (overview)
- 2000; 2004; 2008; 2012; 2016; 2020; 2024

Mongolia has sent athletes to the 2016 Summer Paralympics in Rio de Janeiro, Brazil, from 7 September to 18 September 2016.

== Medallists ==
Medal	Name	Sport	Event	Date
Bronze	Uugankhuu Bolormaa	Judo	Men's 60 kg	8 September
Bronze	Sodnompiljee Enkhbayar	Powerlifting	Men's −88 kg	13 September

== Archery ==
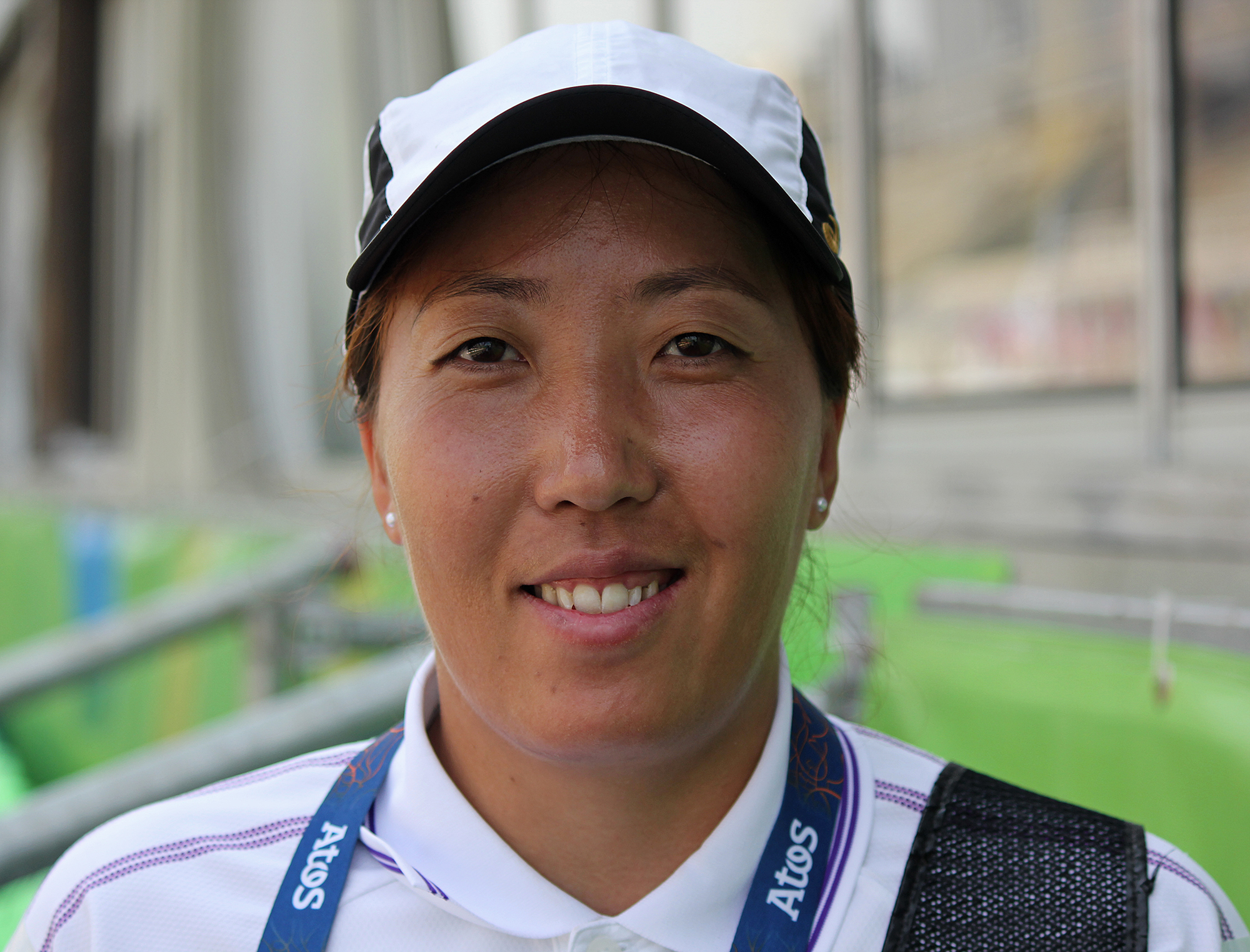
Oyun-Erdene Buyanjargal, archer for Mongolia

Dambadondogiin Baatarjav qualified for the 2016 Summer Paralympics in archery following his performance at the 2015 World Archery Para Championships, where he had a 9th-place finish in the men's open recurve. Mongolia has had some success with archery in the Paralympics before, with Baatarjav Dambadondog winning the country's first gold medal in the country's history after finishing first in the sport at the 2008 Games.

Individual

Athlete	Event	Ranking round		Round of 32	Round of 16	Quarterfinals	Semifinals	Final / BM	
Athlete	Event	Score	Seed	Opposition Score	Opposition Score	Opposition Score	Opposition Score	Opposition Score	Rank
Ankhbayar Amarbayasgalan	Men's individual Recurve open	572	24 Q	Kim (KOR); W 6-5	Sawicki (POL); L 2-6	Did not advance			
Baatarjav Dambadondog	Men's individual Recurve open	583	20 Q	Lee (KOR); W 7-3	Ueyama (JPN); L 4-6	Did not advance			
Oyun-Erdene Buyanjargal	Women's individual Recurve open	563	17	Nadarajah (GBR); W 6-2	Wu (CHN); L 3-7	Did not advance			

Team

Athlete	Event	Ranking round		Round of 16	Quarterfinals	Semifinals	Final / BM	
Athlete	Event	Score	Seed	Opposition Score	Opposition Score	Opposition Score	Opposition Score	Rank
Baatarjav Dambadondog; Oyun-Erdene Buyanjargal	Mixed Team Recurve open	1146	11	Germany (GER); W 5–3	Poland (POL); W 5–4	China (CHN); L 0–6	Italy (ITA); L 1–5	4

== Athletics ==
Women's Field

Athlete	Events	Result	Rank
Tsogtgerel Gendendarjaa	Shot Put F56-57	8.59	5
Tsogtgerel Gendendarjaa	Discus F56-57	No Mark	

== Judo ==
Athlete	Event	Preliminaries	Quarterfinals	Semifinals	Repechage First round	Repechage Final	Final / BM	
Athlete	Event	Opposition Result	Opposition Result	Opposition Result	Opposition Result	Opposition Result	Opposition Result	Rank
Uugankhuu Bolormaa	Men's −60 kg	Mesquita (BRA); W 100–000	Hirose (JPN); L 002–100	Did not advance	Bye	Lee (KOR); W 110–000	Ibrahimov (AZE); W 100–000	3rd place, bronze medalist(s)
Munkhbat Aajim	Men's −66 kg	Perez (PUR); L 000–100	Did not advance					

== Shooting ==
Athlete	Event	Qualification		Semifinal		Final	
Athlete	Event	Score	Rank	Score	Rank	Score	Rank
Ganbaatar Zandraa	Men's 10m air pistol SH1	555	18	—		Did not advance	
Ganbaatar Zandraa	Mixed 25 metre pistol SH1	532	25	Did not advance			
Ganbaatar Zandraa	Mixed 50 metre pistol SH1	500	31	—		Did not advance	

== Powerlifting ==
Athlete	Event	Result	Rank
Sodnompiljee Enkhbayar	Men's −88 kg	210	3rd place, bronze medalist(s)

== See also ==
- Mongolia at the 2016 Summer Olympics
