= Mongolia at the 2014 Winter Paralympics =

- The flag of Mongolia
- IPC code: MGL
- NPC: Mongolian Paralympic Committee

in Sochi
- Competitors: 1 (man) in 1 sport
- Flag bearer: Batmönkhiin Ganbold
- Medals: Gold 0 Silver 0 Bronze 0 Total 0

Winter Paralympics appearances (overview)
- 2006; 2010; 2014; 2018; 2022; 2026

Mongolia sent a delegation to compete at the 2014 Winter Paralympics in Sochi, Russia, from 7–16 March 2014. This was Mongolia's third time participating in a Winter Paralympic Games. The delegation consisted of a single cross-country skier, Batmönkhiin Ganbold. His best performance in any event was 14th in the men's standing 20 kilometer freestyle, he finished 31st in the 10 km event, and did not advance from the qualification round of the 1 km sprint.

== Background ==
Mongolia first joined Paralympic competition at the 2000 Summer Paralympics, and first participated in the Winter Paralympic Games at the 2006 Winter Paralympics. They have participated at every edition of both the Summer and Winter Paralympics since their respective debuts. Sochi was therefore their third Winter Paralympics appearance. Mongolia has, as of 2018, won three medals in the Summer Paralympics, one gold and two bronze, but none in the Winter Paralympics. The 2014 Winter Paralympics were held from 7–16 March 2014, in Sochi, Russia; 45 countries and 547 athletes took part in the multi-sport event. Batmönkhiin Ganbold was the only athlete sent by Mongolia to Sochi. He was chosen as the Mongolian flag-bearer for the parade of nations during the opening ceremony, and the closing ceremony.

== Disability classification ==
Every participant at the Paralympics has their disability grouped into one of five disability categories: amputation, the condition may be congenital or sustained through injury or illness; cerebral palsy; wheelchair athletes, though there is often overlap between this and other categories; visual impairment, including blindness; and Les Autres, any physical disability that does not fall strictly under one of the other categories, like dwarfism or multiple sclerosis. Each Paralympic sport then has its own classifications, dependent upon the specific physical demands of competition. Events are given a code, made of numbers and letters, describing the type of event and classification of the athletes competing. Events with "B" in the code are for athletes with visual impairment, codes LW1 to LW9 are for athletes who stand to compete and LW10 to LW12 are for athletes who compete sitting down. Cross-country skiing events grouped athletes into separate competitions for sitting, standing and visually impaired athletes.

== Cross-country skiing ==
Batmönkhiin Ganbold was 22 years old at the time of the Sochi Paralympics, and is classified as a LW6, meaning he competes in a standing position. The International Paralympic Committee describes the LW6 classification by stating that "Skiers have an impairment in one arm. Skiers will compete with one ski pole only." Ganbold has an acquired arm deficiency, and only began skiing the year before Sochi. On 10 March, he took part in the 20 kilometre standing race, finishing in a time of 1 hour, 1 minute, and 1.5 seconds. This put him in 14 place out of 18 classified finishers, and over 13 minutes behind the gold medalist, Rushan Minnegulov of Russia. Silver was won by Ilkka Tuomisto of Finland, and bronze by Vladislav Lekomtsev of Russia.

On 12 March Ganbold participated in the qualifying round of the Men's 1 kilometer standing sprint classical, finishing the race in a time of 4 minutes and 26.65 seconds, which put him in 25th place out of 35 competitors, in a race where only the top 12 qualified to advance. The gold medal was eventually won by Aleksandr Pronkov of Russia, the silver by Minnegulov, and the bronze by Lekomtsev. In the 10 kilometer standing freestyle, held on 16 March, Ganbold finished with a time of 30 minutes and 26.7 seconds. This put him in 31st place out of 38 competitors. The Russians swept the medal stand again, the gold medal was won by Pronkov in a time of 23 minutes and 59.9 seconds, Minnegulov took silver, and Lekomtsev won the bronze medal. Ganbold would again compete and carry the flag for Mongolia at the 2018 Winter Paralympics.

Athlete	Event	Qualification			Semifinal		Final		
Athlete	Event	Real Time	Result	Rank	Result	Rank	Real Time	Result	Rank
Batmönkhiin Ganbold	1km sprint classic, standing	4:37.76	4:26.65	25	did not qualify				
Batmönkhiin Ganbold	10km free, standing	—N/a					31:42.8	30:26.7	31
Batmönkhiin Ganbold	20km, standing	—N/a					1:11:08.3	1:04:01.5	14

== See also ==
- Mongolia at the Paralympics
- Mongolia at the 2014 Winter Olympics
