= Mongolia at the 2022 Winter Paralympics =

- Flag of Mongolia
- IPC code: MGL
- NPC: Mongolian Paralympic Committee

in Beijing, China 4 March 2022 – 13 March 2022
- Competitors: 3 (3 men) in 2 sports
- Flag bearer: Batmönkhiin Ganbold
- Medals: Gold 0 Silver 0 Bronze 0 Total 0

Winter Paralympics appearances (overview)
- 2006; 2010; 2014; 2018; 2022; 2026

Mongolia competed at the 2022 Winter Paralympics in Beijing, China which took place between 4–13 March 2022. In total, three athletes competed. It was the fifth time the country competed at the Winter Paralympics.

== Competitors ==
The following is the list of number of competitors participating at the Games per sport/discipline.

Sport	Men	Women	Total
Alpine skiing	1	0	1
Cross-country skiing	2	0	2
Total	3	0	3

== Alpine skiing ==
One alpine skier represented Mongolia.

Men

Athlete	Class	Event	Run 1		Run 2		Total	
Athlete	Class	Event	Time	Rank	Time	Rank	Time	Rank
Byambadorjiin Tserenpuntsag	LW6/8-1	Slalom, standing	DNF		did not advance			

== Cross-country skiing ==
Mongolia competed in cross-country skiing.

Men
Distance

Athlete	Class	Event	Factor	Time	Factored time	Rank
Batmönkhiin Ganbold	LW6	Middle distance freestyle, standing	95%	50:39.7	48:07.7	21
Batmönkhiin Ganbold	LW6	Long distance classical, standing	90%	1:11:32.8	1:04:23.5	12
Tsegmidiin Dashdorj	LW8	Middle distance freestyle, standing	96%	42:43.5	41:01.0	14
Tsegmidiin Dashdorj	LW8	Long distance classical, standing	92%	did not finish		

Sprint

Athlete	Class	Event	Factor	Qualification			Semifinal		Final	
Athlete	Class	Event	Factor	Time	Factored time	Rank	Time	Rank	Time	Rank
Batmönkhiin Ganbold	LW6	Sprint freestyle, standing	95%	3:15.15	3:05.39	18	did not advance			
Tsegmidiin Dashdorj	LW8	Sprint freestyle, standing	96%	3:15.13	3:07.32	19	did not advance			

== See also ==
- Mongolia at the Paralympics
- Mongolia at the 2022 Winter Olympics
