= Shirmohammadi =

Shirmohammadi is a surname. Notable people with the surname include:

- Hassan Shirmohammadi (born 1968), Iranian footballer
- Razieh Shirmohammadi (1976/1977–2019), Iranian Paralympic archer
