= Mongolia at the 2018 Winter Paralympics =

- The flag of Mongolia
- IPC code: MGL
- NPC: Mongolian Paralympic Committee

in Pyeongchang
- Competitors: 1 (man) in 1 sport
- Flag bearer: Batmönkhiin Ganbold
- Medals: Gold 0 Silver 0 Bronze 0 Total 0

Winter Paralympics appearances (overview)
- 2006; 2010; 2014; 2018; 2022; 2026

Mongolia sent competitors to the 2018 Winter Paralympics in Pyeongchang, South Korea. Batmönkhiin Ganbold (Mongolian: Б.Ганболд) competed in para-Nordic skiing. He qualified by competing at the Para Nordic Skiing World Cup.

== Team ==
In November 2017, Batmönkhiin Ganbold (Mongolian: Б.Ганболд) was invited to go to the 2018 Winter Paralympics.

The table below contains the list of members of people (called "Team Mongolia") that competed at the 2018 Games.

Team Mongolia
Name	Sport	Gender	Classification	Events	ref
Batmönkhiin Ganbold (Mongolian: Б.Ганболд)	para-Nordic skiing	male	standing	cross country skiing	

== Cross-country skiing ==
Athlete	Event	Qualification			Semifinal		Final		
Athlete	Event	Real Time	Result	Rank	Result	Rank	Real Time	Result	Rank
Batmönkhiin Ganbold	Men's 1.5 km sprint classical standing	4:24.50	3:58.05	14	did not qualify				
Batmönkhiin Ganbold	10km free, standing	—N/a					30:10.1	27:09.1	14
Batmönkhiin Ganbold	20km, standing	—N/a					58:27.4	55:32.0	16

== Russian doping scandal ==
15 National Paralympic Committees and the International Wheelchair and Amputee Sports Federation signed a letter expressing support for the National Paralympic Committee of Russia in August 2017. The countries included Armenia, Belarus, Bulgaria, Vietnam, Kazakhstan, Kyrgyzstan, China, Laos, Moldova, Mongolia, Serbia, Tajikistan, Montenegro, and South Korea. They asked the IPC Governing Board to consider letting Russia compete at the 2018 Winter Paralympics. The letter was signed weeks before the IPC Governing Board met in Abu Dhabi. In September 2017, this decision was reviewed and upheld. The International Paralympic Committee (IPC) still had concerns about doping in Russian sport. All the conditions the IPC required of the Russians were not met.

== Para-Nordic skiing ==
Batmunkh competed at the 2014 Winter Paralympics. His best finish was fourteenth. This was in the 20km Classic Style - Standing race. He had a time of 1:11:08.3. His best finish at the World Championships was in 2017. He finished ninth in the 20km - Standing. He had a result of 1:02:15.4. In September 2017, Batmunkh went to a World Cup in Germany. He already had 130 World Cup points. Fifth of those points were in the 2017/2018 season. These points made it possible for him to go to the Paralympics. Batmunkh is coached by J. Dondo (Mongolian: Ж.Дондогийн) .
