= Mongolia at the 2024 Summer Paralympics =

- Flag of Mongolia
- IPC code: MGL
- NPC: Mongolian Paralympic Committee

in Paris, France August 28, 2024 – September 8, 2024
- Competitors: 12 in 6 sports
- Flag bearers: Enkhbayaryn Sodnompiljee; Buyanjargalyn Oyun-Erdene
- Medals Ranked 57th: Gold 1 Silver 3 Bronze 0 Total 4

Summer Paralympics appearances (overview)
- 2000; 2004; 2008; 2012; 2016; 2020; 2024

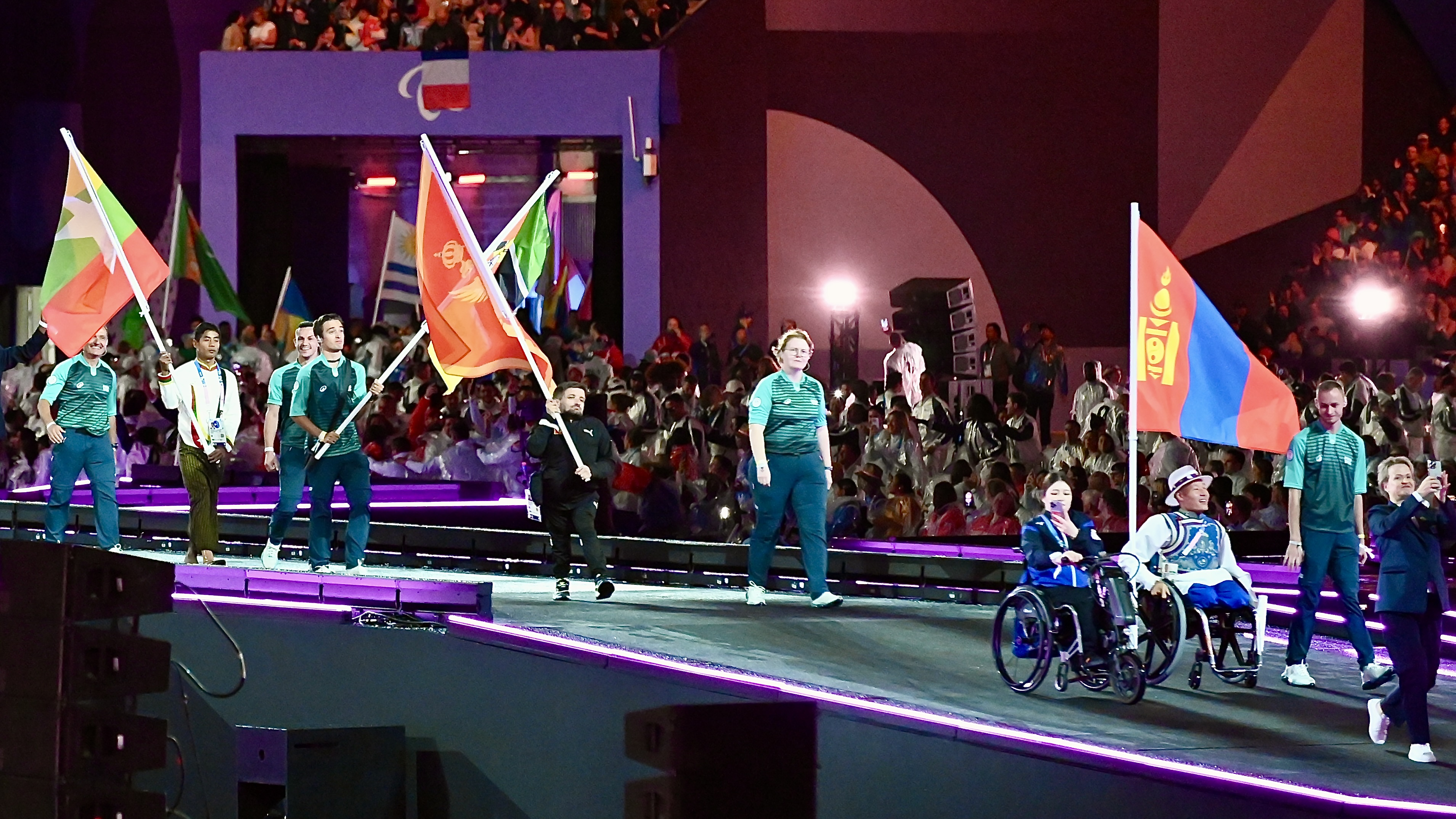
Flagbearers at the opening ceremony

Mongolia competed at the 2024 Summer Paralympics in Paris, France, from 28 August to 8 September. With 4 medals won, this was Mongolia's most successful Paralympics to date.

Ulambayaryn Sürenjav became Mongolia's first female Paralympics gold medalist, while Enkhbayaryn Sodnompiljee made history by winning a trio of Paralympics medals, adding a silver to his bronze and gold from Rio de Janeiro and Tokyo, respectively.

== Medalists ==
Medal	Name	Sport	Event	Date
Gold	Ulambayaryn Sürenjav	Taekwondo	Women's K44 -52kg	29 August
Silver	Ganbatyn Bolor-Erdene	Taekwondo	Men's K44 -63kg	30 August
Silver	Tsegmidiin Battulga	Athletics	Men's shot put F40	1 September
Silver	Enkhbayaryn Sodnompiljee	Powerlifting	Men's -107kg	8 September

== Competitors ==
The following is the list of number of competitors in the Games.

Sport	Men	Women	Total
Archery	0	2	2
Athletics	2	0	2
Judo	2	2	4
Powerlifting	1	0	1
Swimming	0	1	1
Taekwondo	1	1	2
Total	6	6	12

== Archery ==
Women

Athlete	Event	Ranking Round		Round of 32	Round of 16	Quarterfinals	Semifinals	Finals	
Athlete	Event	Score	Seed	Opposition Score	Opposition Score	Opposition Score	Opposition Score	Opposition Score	Rank
Dembereliin Selengee	Individual recurve open	622	3	Bye	Shevchenko (UKR); W 6–2	Lavrinc (SLO); W 6–4	Wu C (CHN); L 4–6	Mijno (ITA); L 2–6	4
Buyanjargalyn Oyun-Erdene	Individual recurve open	524	18	Floreno (ITA); W 6–0	Wu C (CHN); L 0–6	Did not advance			

== Athletics ==
Key

- Note–Ranks given for track events are within the athlete's heat only
- Q = Qualified for the next round
- q = Qualified for the next round as a fastest loser or, in field events, by position without achieving the qualifying target
- DQ = Disqualified
- PR = Paralympic Record
- AR = Area (or continental) Record
- NR = National Record
- SB = Season's Best
- N/A = Round not applicable for the event
- Bye = Athlete not required to compete in round

Men's track

Athlete	Event	Heat		Final	
Athlete	Event	Result	Rank	Result	Rank
Pürevtsogiin Enkhmanlai	100 m T53	16.03	5	Did not advance	

Men's field

Athlete	Event	Final	
Athlete	Event	Distance	Position
Tsegmidiin Battulga	Shot put F40	11.09m	2nd place, silver medalist(s)

== Judo ==
Men

Athlete	Event	Preliminaries	Quarterfinals	Semifinals	Repechage Final	Final / BM		
Athlete	Event	Opposition Score	Opposition Score	Opposition Score	Opposition Score	Opposition Score	Opposition Score	Rank
Batkhuyagiin Battögs	–90 kg J1	Teodiri (ITA); L 00–10 (DNS)	Did not advance					
Dashtserengiin Ganbat	+90 kg J1	Bye	Tastan (TUR); W 10–00	Silva (BRA); L 00–10	Bye	Zakiev (AZE); L 01–00	5	

Women

Athlete	Event	Preliminaries	Quarterfinals	Semifinals	Repechage 1st round	Repechage Final	Final / BM	
Athlete	Event	Opposition Score	Opposition Score	Opposition Score	Opposition Score	Opposition Score	Opposition Score	Rank
Togtokhbayaryn Suvd-Erdene	–48 kg J1	—N/a	Andrade (BRA); L 00–10	Did not advance				
Lkhaijavyn Turuunaa	–70 kg J1	Bye	Goodrich (SWE); L 00–10	Did not advance	bye	Boggiano (ARG); W 10-01	Paschadilou (GRE); L 00–10	5

== Powerlifting ==
Mongolia qualified one athlete for Powerlifting.

Athlete	Event	Total lifted	Rank
Enkhbayaryn Sodnompiljee	Men's –107 kg	248	2nd place, silver medalist(s)

== Taekwondo ==
Athlete	Event	Round of 16	Quarterfinals	Semifinals	Repechage	Final / BM	
Athlete	Event	Opposition Result	Opposition Result	Opposition Result	Opposition Result	Opposition Result	Rank
Ganbatyn Bolor-Erdene	Men's –63 kg	Bye	Castro (DOM); W 19–5	Bossolo (ITA); W 6–4	—N/a	Bozteke (TUR); L 7–9	2nd place, silver medalist(s)
Ulambayaryn Sürenjav	Women's –52 kg	Bye	Hassan (EGY); W 7–5	Quijano (MEX); W 13–5	—N/a	Rahimi (IRI); W 5–2	1st place, gold medalist(s)

== Swimming ==
Women

Athlete	Events	Heats		Final	
Athlete	Events	Time	Rank	Time	Rank
Khüreliin Nomuun	50 m freestyle S6	47.77	13	Did not advance	
Khüreliin Nomuun	100m backstroke S6	1:55.58	12	Did not advance	

== See also ==
- Mongolia at the 2024 Summer Olympics
- Mongolia at the Paralympics
