= Mongolia at the 2004 Summer Paralympics =

- IPC code: MGL
- NPC: Mongolian Paralympic Committee

in Athens
- Competitors: 3 in 2 sports
- Flag bearer: Jambal Lkhagvajav
- Medals: Gold 0 Silver 0 Bronze 0 Total 0

Summer Paralympics appearances (overview)
- 2000; 2004; 2008; 2012; 2016; 2020; 2024

Mongolia competed at the 2004 Summer Paralympics in Athens. The country was represented by three athletes competing in two sports, and did not win any medals.

== Competitors ==
=== Archery ===
==== Men ====
Athlete	Event	Ranking round		Round of 32	Round of 16	Quarterfinals	Semifinals	Finals	
Athlete	Event	Score	Seed	Opposition score	Opposition score	Opposition score	Opposition score	Opposition score	Rank
Dambadondogiin Baatarjav	Men's individual standing	604	9	Bye	R Olejnik (POL); W 153-143	Zhu W (CHN); L 93-97	did not advance		=5

=== Athletics ===
==== Men's track ====
Athlete	Class	Event	Heats		Semifinal		Final	
Athlete	Class	Event	Result	Rank	Result	Rank	Result	Rank
Jambal Lkhagvajav	T11	Marathon	—N/a				3:03:03	6

==== Women's track ====
Athlete	Class	Event	Heats		Semifinal		Final	
Athlete	Class	Event	Result	Rank	Result	Rank	Result	Rank
Dashzevg Sanduidemchig	T11	200m	34.82	10	did not advance			
Dashzevg Sanduidemchig	T12	400m	1:17.20	8	did not advance			

== See also ==
- Mongolia at the Paralympics
- Mongolia at the 2004 Summer Olympics
