= Archery at the 2004 Summer Paralympics – Men's individual standing =

Men's Individual standing at the XII Paralympic Games
- Paralympic Archery
- Venue: Olympic Baseball Centre (Athens)
- Dates: 21–25 September
- Competitors: 22 from 14 nations

Medalists
1st place, gold medalist(s)		Imrich Lyocsa	Slovakia
2nd place, silver medalist(s)		Tomasz Lezanski	Poland
3rd place, bronze medalist(s)		An Tae Sung	South Korea

The men's individual standing archery competition at the 2004 Summer Paralympics was held from 21 to 25 September at the Olympic Baseball Centre (Athens).

The event was won by Imrich Lyocsa, representing Slovakia.

== Results ==
=== Ranking Round ===
Rank	Competitor	Points	Notes
1	Lee Hak Young (KOR)	638	WR
2	Kimimasa Onodera (JPN)	628	
3	Imrich Lyocsa (SVK)	611	
4	Tomasz Lezanski (POL)	611	
5	Cho Hyu Kwan (KOR)	609	
6	Ryszard Bukanski (POL)	609	
7	Vladimir Majercak (SVK)	606	
8	Ryszard Olejnik (POL)	605	
9	Dambadondogiin Baatarjav (MGL)	604	
10	An Tae Sung (KOR)	603	
11	Serhiy Atamanenko (UKR)	591	
12	Juan Miguel Zarzuela (ESP)	590	
13	Rajeeva Wickramasinghe (SRI)	579	
14	Yuriy Kopiy (UKR)	578	
15	Heshmatollah Kazemi Rad (IRI)	575	
16	Zhu Weiliang (CHN)	575	
17	Eddy Gobbato (FRA)	574	
18	Jaroslav Lazo (SVK)	573	
19	Luiz Martinez (VEN)	538	
20	Ghasem Javani Gorgabi (IRI)	532	
21	Paul Hawthorne (GBR)	530	
22	Romaios Roumeliotis (GRE)	469	

=== Competition bracket ===
Round of 32
Eddy Gobbato (FRA)	136
Zhu Weiliang (CHN)	143
Paul Hawthorne (GBR)	136
Juan Miguel Zarzuela (ESP)	151
Rajeeva Wickramasinghe (SRI)	140
Ghasem Javani Gorgabi (IRI)	127
Luiz Martinez (VEN)	138
Yuriy Kopiy (UKR)	133
Serhiy Atamanenko (UKR)	147
Romaios Roumeliotis (GRE)	116
Heshmatollah Kazemi Rad (IRI)	137
Jaroslav Lazo (SVK)	127

Round of 16
Lee Hak Young (KOR)	154
Zhu Weiliang (CHN)	155
Dambadondogiin Baatarjav (MGL)	153
Ryszard Olejnik (POL)	143
Cho Hyu Kwan (KOR)	142
Juan Miguel Zarzuela (ESP)	144
Rajeeva Wickramasinghe (SRI)	147
Tomasz Lezanski (POL)	149
Imrich Lyocsa (SVK)	147
Luiz Martinez (VEN)	134
Serhiy Atamanenko (UKR)	150
Ryszard Bukanski (POL)	143
Vladimir Majercak (SVK)	143
An Tae Sung (KOR)	152
Heshmatollah Kazemi Rad (IRI)	142
Kimimasa Onodera (JPN)	141

Quarterfinals
Zhu Weiliang (CHN)	97
Dambadondogiin Baatarjav (MGL)	93
Juan Miguel Zarzuela (ESP)	89
Tomasz Lezanski (POL)	95
Imrich Lyocsa (SVK)	95
Serhiy Atamanenko (UKR)	86
An Tae Sung (KOR)	102
Heshmatollah Kazemi Rad (IRI)	76

Semifinals
Zhu Weiliang (CHN)	88
Tomasz Lezanski (POL)	97
Imrich Lyocsa (SVK)	104
An Tae Sung (KOR)	92

Final
Tomasz Lezanski (POL)	103
Imrich Lyocsa (SVK) ^{[1]}	103
Third place
Zhu Weiliang (CHN)	99
An Tae Sung (KOR)	108

^{[1]} Decided by additional arrows: 5:8
