= Maurizio Fistarol =

Italian politician from Veneto

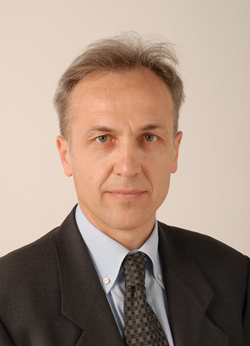
Maurizio Fistarol

Maurizio Fistarol (Belluno, 12 April 1957) is an Italian politician from Veneto.

A member of the Italian Communist Party and, later, of the Democratic Party of the Left, Fistarol was elected Mayor of Belluno in 1993. Re-elected in 1997, he was active in the North-East Movement and The Democrats. A founding member of Democracy is Freedom – The Daisy, he was elected to the Italian Chamber of Deputies in 2001 and re-elected in 2006. In 2008 he was elected senator for the Democratic Party.

In 2010 Fistarol was one of the twelve promoters of Toward North, along with Massimo Cacciari, Giuseppe Bortolussi and Diego Bottacin.
