= List of mayors of Belluno =

Mayor of Belluno
- Sindaco di Belluno
- Incumbent; Oscar De Pellegrin since 17 June 2022
- Appointer: Popular election
- Term length: 5 years, renewable once
- Formation: 1860
- Website: Official website

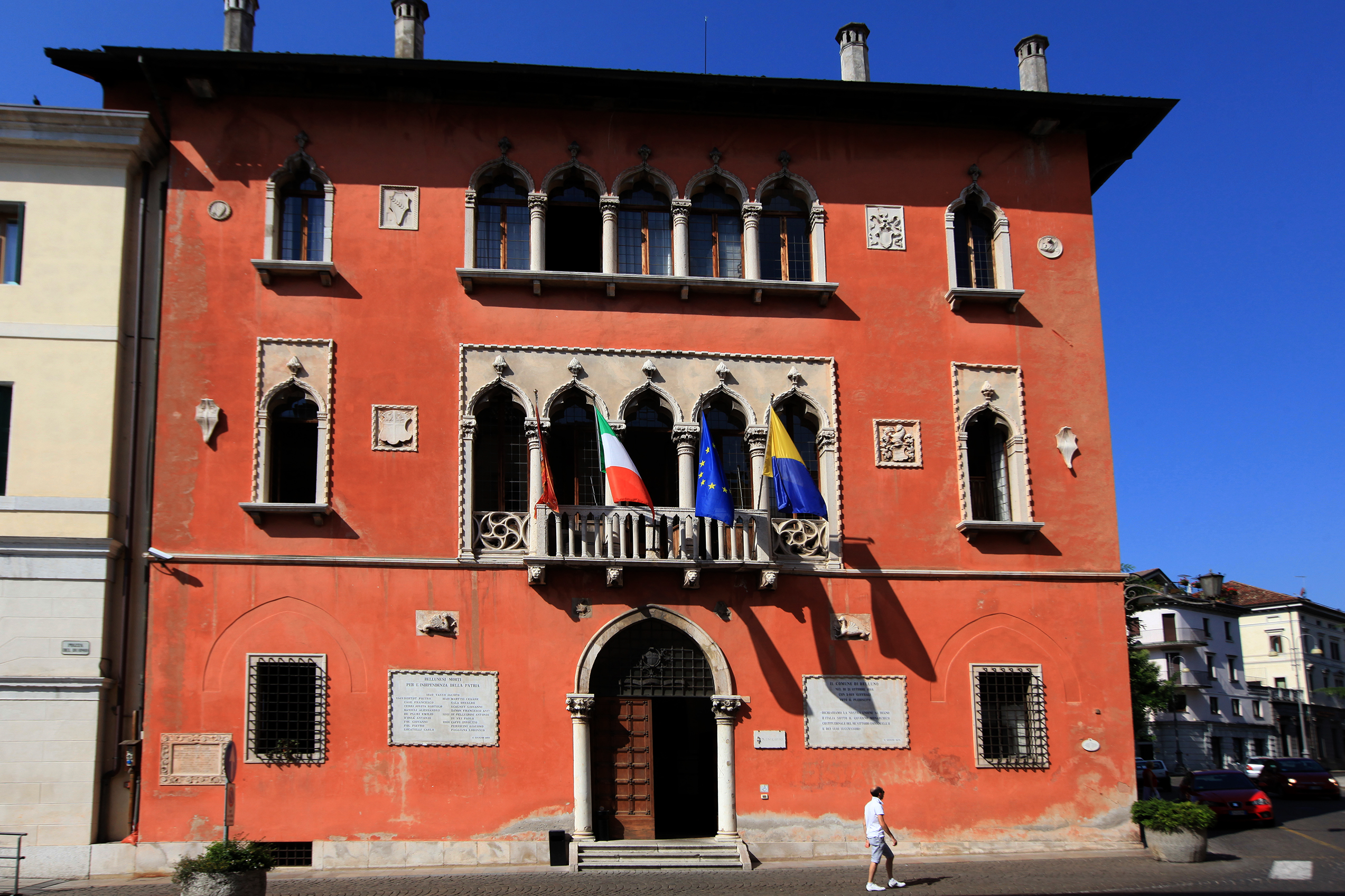
Belluno City Hall

The mayor of Belluno is an elected politician who, along with the Belluno's city council. The mayor is accountable for the strategic government of Belluno in Veneto, Italy.

The current mayor is Oscar De Pellegrin, a centre-right independent, who took office on 17 June 2022.

== Overview ==
According to the Italian Constitution, the mayor of Belluno is a member of the city council.

The mayor is elected by the population of Belluno, who also elects the members of the city council, controlling the mayor's policy guidelines and is able to enforce his resignation by a motion of no confidence. The mayor is entitled to appoint and release the members of his government.

Since 1993 the mayor is elected directly by Belluno's electorate: in all mayoral elections in Italy in cities with a population higher than 15,000 the voters express a direct choice for the mayor or an indirect choice voting for the party of the candidate's coalition. If no candidate receives at least 50% of votes, the top two candidates go to a second round after two weeks. The election of the City Council is based on a direct choice for the candidate with a preference vote: the candidate with the majority of the preferences is elected. The number of the seats for each party is determined proportionally.

== Italian Republic (since 1946) ==
=== City Council election (1946–1993) ===
From 1946 to 1993, the Mayor of Belluno was elected by the City Council.

	Mayor	Term start	Term end	Party
1	Vincenzo Lante	1946	1951	PSI
2	Adriano Barcelloni Corte	1951	1957	DC
3	Annibale De Mas	1957	1967	DC
4	Giambattista Marson	1967	1968	DC
5	Piero Zanchetta	1968	1974	DC
6	Flavio Dalle Mule	1974	1974	PSDI
7	Giuseppe Viel	1974	1976	DC
8	Romolo Dal Mas	1976	1979	PRI
(7)	Giuseppe Viel	1979	1980	DC
9	Mario Neri	1980	1983	DC
10	Gaetano Toscano	1983	1984	PSDI
(9)	Mario Neri	1984	1986	DC
11	Giovanni Crema	1986	1990	PSI
12	Aldo Da Rold	1990	1990	PRI
13	Gianclaudio Bressa	1990	1993	DC

=== Direct election (since 1993) ===
Since 1993, under provisions of new local administration law, the Mayor of Belluno is chosen by direct election, originally every four, then every five years.

	Mayor	Term start	Term end	Party	Coalition	Election
14	Maurizio Fistarol	20 June 1993	28 April 1997	PDS; Dem	PDS • FdV	1993
14	Maurizio Fistarol	28 April 1997	4 April 2001 (Note: Resigned in order to participate to the national general elections.)	PDS; Dem	PDS • PPI • SI • FdV	1997
Special Prefectural Commissioner tenure (4 April 2001 – 28 May 2001)
15	Ermano De Col	28 May 2001	13 June 2006	DS	DS • PPI • PRC	2001
16	Celeste Bortoluzzi	13 June 2006	15 September 2006 (Note: Died in office. The deputy mayor Franco Gidoni (LN) held the office till a new municipal election was held.)	FI	FI • LN • AN	2006
17	Antonio Prade	29 May 2007	22 May 2012	PdL	PdL • LN • UDC	2007
18	Jacopo Massaro	22 May 2012	27 June 2017	Ind	Ind	2012
18	Jacopo Massaro	27 June 2017	17 June 2022	Ind	Ind	2017
19	Oscar De Pellegrin	17 June 2022	Incumbent	Ind	FI • Lega • FdI	2022
