= Jacopo Massaro =

Italian politician

Mayor of Belluno
- In office 22 May 2012 – 17 June 2022
- Preceded by: Antonio Prade
- Succeeded by: Oscar De Pellegrin

Personal details
- Born: 12 February 1974 (age 52) Florence, Tuscany, Italy
- Party: Centre-left independent
- Profession: employee

Jacopo Massaro (born 12 February 1974 in Florence) is an Italian politician.

Massaro ran as an independent for the office of Mayor of Belluno at the 2012 Italian local elections, supported by a centre-left coalition. He won and took office on 22 May 2012.

He was re-elected for a second term on 27 June 2017.

== See also ==
- 2012 Italian local elections
- 2017 Italian local elections
- List of mayors of Belluno

Political offices
Preceded by Antonio Prade	Mayor of Belluno; 2012-2022	Succeeded by Oscar De Pellegrin
