= Mongolia at the 2000 Summer Paralympics =

- IPC code: MGL
- NPC: Mongolian Paralympic Committee

in Sydney, Australia
- Competitors: 2 in 2 sports
- Medals: Gold 0 Silver 0 Bronze 0 Total 0

Summer Paralympics appearances (overview)
- 2000; 2004; 2008; 2012; 2016; 2020; 2024

Mongolia made its Paralympic début at the 2000 Summer Paralympics in Sydney. The country was represented by two athletes competing in two sports, and did not win any medals.

== Sports ==
=== Archery ===
| Athlete | Event | Ranking round | | Round of 32 | Round of 16 | Quarterfinals | Semifinals | Finals | |
| Athlete | Event | Score | Seed | Opposition score | Opposition score | Opposition score | Opposition score | Opposition score | Rank |
|---|---|---|---|---|---|---|---|---|---|
| Dambadondogiin Baatarjav | Men's individual standing | 575 | 11 | Padpong (THA); W 138(8)–138(4) | Bukanski (POL); W 153–143 | An (KOR); L 94–102 | Did not advance | | 5 |

=== Athletics ===
| Athlete | Event | Heats | | Final | |
| Athlete | Event | Result | Rank | Result | Rank |
|---|---|---|---|---|---|
| Jambal Lkhagvajav | Men's 1500m T12 | 4:38.60 | 4 | Did not advance | |
| Jambal Lkhagvajav | Men's 5000m T12 | —N/a | | DQ | |
| Jambal Lkhagvajav | Men's marathon T12 | —N/a | | DQ | |

== See also ==
- Mongolia at the Paralympics
- Mongolia at the 2000 Summer Olympics
