= Mongolia at the 2010 Winter Paralympics =

- IPC code: MGL
- NPC: Mongolian Paralympic Committee

in Vancouver
- Competitors: 2 in 1 sport
- Flag bearer: Enkhbaatar Zorig
- Medals: Gold 0 Silver 0 Bronze 0 Total 0

Winter Paralympics appearances (overview)
- 2006; 2010; 2014; 2018; 2022; 2026

Mongolia sent a delegation consisting of two male cross-country skiers to compete at the 2010 Winter Paralympics in Vancouver, British Columbia, Canada.

== Cross-country skiing ==
Athlete	Event	Final					
Athlete	Event	Run 1	Run 2	Run 3	Total Time	Calculated Time	Rank
Zorig Enkhbaatar	1 km Sprint standing						28th
Zorig Enkhbaatar	10 km standing				41:19.3	37:36.2	24th
Sukhbaatar Nyamaa	10 km standing						dns
Sukhbaatar Nyamaa	5 km standing				33:24.8	33:24.7	31st
Sukhbaatar Nyamaa	1 km Sprint standing						30th
Sukhbaatar Nyamaa	10 km standing				58:48.9	53:31.3	25th

== See also ==
- Mongolia at the 2010 Winter Olympics
- Mongolia at the Paralympics
