= Choi Yuen Lung =

Hong Kong Paralympic archer

Personal information
- Nationality: Hong Konger
- Born: 3 February 1977 (age 49) Hong Kong

Sport
- Sport: Archery
- Event: Compound
- Coached by: Patrick Ma Choi Chong
Medal record
Representing Hong Kong
Asian Grand Prix
Silver medal – second place	2013 Ulanbataar	Women's Compound
Bronze medal – third place	2013 Ulanbataar	Women's Compound Team

Choi Yuen Ling (born 3 February 1977) is a Hong Kong Paralympic archer.

She has competed at the Summer Paralympics and other championships.
