= Salvatore Carrubba =

Italian Paralympic archer (born 1962)

Personal information
- Nickname: Pippo
- Born: 6 August 1962 (age 63) Ragusa, Italy

Sport
- Country: Italy
- Sport: Para archery
Medal record
| Event | 1st | 2nd | 3rd |
|---|---|---|---|
| Paralympic Games | 1 | 0 | 0 |

Salvatore "Pippo" Carrubba (born 6 August 1962) is a former Italian paralympic archer who won a gold medal at the 2000 Summer Paralympics.
