= Fabrice Meunier =

French Paralympic archer (born 1973)

Medal record

Men's archery

Representing France

Paralympic Games
Silver medal – second place	2008 Beijing	Individual recurve standing

Fabrice Meunier (born 3 June 1973) is a French paralympic archer. He won the silver medal in the Men's individual recurve event at the 2008 Summer Paralympics in Beijing.
