= Razieh Shirmohammadi =

Iranian Paralympic archer

Personal information
- Native name: راضیه شیرمحمدی
- Born: 1976 or 1977
- Died: 25 June 2019

Sport
- Country: Iran
- Sport: Para archery
Medal record
Women's para archery
Representing Iran
Paralympic Games
| Bronze medal – third place | 2012 London | Team recurve |
Asian Para Games
| Gold medal – first place | 2010 Guangzhou | Individual recurve - standing |

Razieh Shirmohammadi (Persian: راضیه شیرمحمدی; 1976 or 1977–25 June 2019) was an Iranian Paralympic archer.

== Career ==
Shirmohammadi competed at the 2010 Asian Para Games, winning a gold medal. The following year, she won a bronze medal at the 2011 World Para Archery Championships. At the 2012 Summer Paralympics in London, Shirmohammadi and teammates Zahra Javanmard and Zahra Nemati won bronze medals in the women's team recurve open.

She competed at the 2016 Summer Paralympics in Rio de Janeiro. Shirmohammadi won a gold medal in the compound women open competition at the 2017 World Para Archery Championships. The following year, she won silver in the Mixed Team Compound Open competition at the 2018 Asian Para Games.

At the time of her death, she had recently won a quota spot for the 2020 Summer Paralympics through her results at the 2021 World Archery Para Championships in the Netherlands.

== Personal life ==
Shirmohammadi was born in Mashhad, Iran.

Shirmohammadi died of a heart attack in 2019, aged 42.

== Legacy ==
In 2021, a bust of Shirmohammadi was unveiled at the Hall of Fame in Tehran.
