= Chen Yegang =

Chinese Paralympic archer

Medal record

Men's archery

Representing China

Paralympic Games
| Silver medal – second place | 2008 Beijing | Team recurve |
| Bronze medal – third place | 2008 Beijing | Individual recurve |

Chen Yegang is a Chinese paralympic archer. He won the silver medal at the Men's team recurve event and the bronze medal in the Men's individual recurve event at the 2008 Summer Paralympics in Beijing.
