= Mongolia at the 2006 Winter Paralympics =

- IPC code: MGL
- NPC: Mongolian Paralympic Committee

in Turin
- Competitors: 1 in 1 sport
- Medals Ranked 20th: Gold 0 Silver 0 Bronze 0 Total 0

Winter Paralympics appearances (overview)
- 2006; 2010; 2014; 2018; 2022; 2026

Mongolia made its Winter Paralympic début at the ninth Winter Paralympics in Turin, Italy. The country was represented by one athlete competing in one sport, and did not win any medals.

== Events ==
=== Nordic skiing ===
- men's 10km standing: Nyamaa Sukhbaatar
- men's 5km standing: Nyamaa Sukhbaatar

== Medalists ==
	(gold)	(silver)	(bronze)	Total
Mongolia	0	0	0	0

== See also ==
- 2006 Winter Paralympics
- Mongolia at the 2006 Winter Olympics
