= Kim Hong-kyu =

South Korean Paralympic archer

Medal record

Archery

Representing South Korea

Paralympic Games
Gold medal – first place	2008 Beijing	Men's team recurve

Kim Hong Kyu (Korean: 김홍규)is a South Korean paralympic archer. He won the gold medal at the Men's team recurve event at the 2008 Summer Paralympics in Beijing.
