= Kim Ki-hee =

South Korean Paralympic archer

- Hangul: 김기희
- RR: Gim Gihui
- MR: Kim Kihŭi

Kim Ki-hee
Medal record

Women's Archery

Representing South Korea

Paralympic Games
| Silver medal – second place | 2008 Beijing | Team recurve |

Kim Ki-hee (born January 28, 1953) is a South Korean paralympic archer. She won the silver medal at the Women's team recurve event at the 2008 Summer Paralympics in Beijing.
