= Cheng Changjie =

Chinese Paralympic archer

Personal information
- Born: 3 February 1989 (age 37)

Sport
- Sport: Para archery
Medal record
Men's archery
Representing China
Paralympic Games
Silver medal – second place	2008 Beijing	Team recurve
Bronze medal – third place	2012 London	Team recurve
Asian Para Games
Gold medal – first place	2010 Guangzhou	Team recurve
Silver medal – second place	2010 Guangzhou	Individual recurve W1/W2

Cheng Changjie (born 3 February 1989) is a Chinese paralympic archer. He won the silver medal at the Men's team recurve event at the 2008 Summer Paralympics in Beijing.
