= Marco Vitale =

Italian Paralympic archer

Medal record

Men's archery

Representing Italy

Paralympic Games
Bronze medal – third place	2008 Beijing	Team recurve

Marco Vitale is an Italian paralympic archer. He won the bronze medal at the Men's team recurve event and the silver medal at the Men's individual recurve at the 2008 Summer Paralympics in Beijing.
