= José Manuel Marín =

Spanish Paralympic archer

Personal information
- Full name: José Manuel Marín Rodríguez
- Nationality: Spanish
- Born: 19 July 1971 (age 54) Adra, Almería, Spain

Sport
- Country: Spain
- Sport: Archery

José Manuel Marín Rodríguez (born 19 July 1971) is an archer from Spain. He represented Spain at the 2004 Summer Paralympics, 2008 Summer Paralympics and 2012 Summer Paralympics. He has also competed in several world championships.

== Personal ==
Marín was born on 19 July 1971 in Adra, Almería. He is a paraplegic. In 2012, he lived in Roquetas de Mar, Almería.

== Archery ==
Marín is an amateur ARW2 classified archer who has used a lot of his own money to fund his hobby.

In 2001 Marín finished fifth in the men's recurve bow event at the European Championship in Vichy in Southern France. Madrid hosted the 2003 IPC World Championships, where Marin finished sixteenth in the individual W2 event and seventh in the team recurve event. He took home a gold medal at the 2006 European Championship held in Nymburk, Czech Republic. Marin won his next gold medal, again in Nymburk, when he was a member of the winning team in the recurve event at the 2009 CTO World Championships.

Marín finished fourth in the wheelchair men's recurve at the Spanish national adaptive indoor championships in 2010. He lost to Manuel Candela in the bronze medal match. In August 2010, he participated in the European adaptive archery championships hosted by Vichy, France. He finished ninth. Vitoria-Gasteiz, Spain, hosted the Spanish adaptive archery national indoor championships in February 2011, where Marin won the men's recurve event. In April 2011, he participated in a Spanish adaptive archery competition, winning a preliminary match by 5 ends to 3. He went on to the first place finals, defeating Antonio Sánchez in a tiebreaker draw following a tie of 5 ends to 5. Ibiza hosted the June 2011 Spanish adaptive championships, where Marin earned a gold medal in his event after defeating Sergio Llamas in a head-to-head final. The World Championships were held in July 2011. Marin finished ninth in the men's W1-W2 recurve event.

The qualifying competition for the London world championship was held in August 2011 at Stoke Mandeville. Marin tried to earn a place for Spain to compete in one of the twenty categories. Due to the poor performance of Spanish archers at the previous world championships, the Spanish Sports Federation for Persons with Physical Disabilities did not provide funding for Marin or other Spanish archers to compete at this event. Funding instead came from regional sports federations. Club Arquero Chiclana organized the 2012 Spanish national championships in June 2012. Marin finished first there in the W2 standing recurve event. Following the merger of the Spanish archery federations for archers with disabilities and those without, a combined national championship was held in February 2013. Marin was one of ten archers with disabilities to take part. He had a score of 531 points in the individual recurve bow, two points better than W2-classified Spanish archer Manuel Candela.

=== Paralympics ===
Marin competed in archery at the 2004 Summer Paralympics, 2008 Summer Paralympics and the 2012 Summer Paralympics.

In the 1/8th final of the men's team event at the Athens Games, Marin's team lost to Slovenia 209 - 209 and was eliminated. He did not win a medal in the individual men's recurve event. His team had a bye in the first round of the 1/8th final of the men's team event at the Beijing Games, and finished eighth overall. In the individual men's W2 recurve event, Marin finished twenty-first overall.

Despite participating in an IPC event that qualified Spain for the 2012 Summer Paralympics at the Stoke Mandeville event, Marin had to fight to qualify as a representative of the Spanish team for London. He was coached by Irene Cuesta for the London Games. He was nervous at this competition. He participated in the recurve W1-W2 event, reaching the 1/8th final. He went head to head against United States archer Russell Wolfe at the London Games.
