= Cho Hyun-kwan =

South Korean Paralympic archer

Medal record

Archery

Representing South Korea

Paralympic Games
| Gold medal – first place | 2008 Beijing | Men's team recurve |

Cho Hyun Kwan (Korean: 조현관) is a South Korean paralympic archer. He won the gold medal at the Men's team recurve event at the 2008 Summer Paralympics in Beijing.
