= Kenny Allen (archer) =

British Paralympic archer (born 1969)

Personal information
- Full name: Kenneth Allen
- Nationality: British
- Born: 8 October 1969 (age 56) Bedford, Bedfordshire, England

Sport
- Sport: Archery
- Event: Recurve
Medal record
Representing Great Britain
World Para Archery Championships
Bronze medal – third place	2013 Bangkok	Men's recurve open (team)

Kenneth "Kenny" Allen (born 8 October 1969) is a British Paralympic archer.

He competed in individual and team recurve in the 2012 Summer Paralympics in London and won his first World Championship medal in Bangkok in 2013.

== Biography ==
Allen was born with spina bifida and lives in Wymondham, Norfolk. During the 2012 Summer Paralympics he set a new Paralympic record with 651 points.

When reclassification took effect in April 2014, Allen was no longer eligible to compete in para-archery under the new rules and decided to focus on able-bodied events instead.

== Personal life ==
Allen is married and has two children.
