= Dong Zhi (archer) =

Chinese Paralympic archer

Personal information
- Born: 11 October 1981 (age 44)

Sport
- Sport: Para archery
Medal record
Archery
Representing China
Paralympic Games
Silver medal – second place	2008 Beijing	Men's team recurve
Bronze medal – third place	2012 London	Men's team recurve
Asian Para Games
Gold medal – first place	2010 Guangzhou	Team recurve
Gold medal – first place	2010 Guangzhou	Individual recurve standing

Dong Zhi (Chinese: 董智) is a Chinese paralympic archer. He won the silver medal at the Men's team recurve event at the 2008 Summer Paralympics in Beijing.
