= Imrich Lyócsa =

Slovak para archer and wheelchair curler

Personal information
- Nationality: Slovak
- Born: 21 July 1963 (age 63) Košice, Czechoslovakia

Sport
- Country: Slovakia
- Sport: Paralympic archery
Medal record
Paralympic archery
Representing Slovakia
Paralympic Games
Gold medal – first place	2004 Athens	Men's individual standing
Bronze medal – third place	2000 Sydney	Men's individual standing
World Championships
Gold medal – first place	1998 Stoke Mandeville	Men's standing
Gold medal – first place	2003 Madrid	Men's standing

Imrich Lyócsa (born 21 July 1963) is a Slovak former para archer and wheelchair curler. Lyócsa has competed in four Summer Paralympics (2000, 2004, 2008 and 2012) and he competed in the 2018 Winter Paralympics as an alternate in the wheelchair curling team.

== Wheelchair curling teams and events ==
Season	Skip	Third	Second	Lead	Alternate	Coach	Events
2008–09	Radoslav Ďuriš	Dušan Pitoňák	Branislav Jakubec	Alena Kánová	Imrich Lyócsa	Pavol Pitoňák	WWhCQ 2008 (10th)
2014–15	Radoslav Ďuriš	Branislav Jakubec	Dušan Pitoňák	Monika Kunkelová	Imrich Lyócsa	František Pitoňák	WWhCC 2015 (4th)
2015–16	Radoslav Ďuriš	Dušan Pitoňák	Peter Zaťko	Monika Kunkelová	Imrich Lyócsa	František Pitoňák	WWhCC 2016 (9th)
2016–17	Radoslav Ďuriš	Dušan Pitoňák	Peter Zaťko	Monika Kunkelová	Imrich Lyócsa	František Pitoňák	WWhBCC 2016 (bronze)
2017–18	Dušan Pitoňák (fourth)	Radoslav Ďuriš (skip)	Peter Zaťko	Monika Kunkelová	Imrich Lyócsa	František Pitoňák, Pavol Pitoňák	WPG 2018 (9th)
2018–19	Radoslav Ďuriš	Dušan Pitoňák	Imrich Lyócsa	Monika Kunkelová	Peter Zaťko	František Pitoňák (WWhCC), Milan Bubenik	WWhBCC 2018 (silver); WWhCC 2019 (6th)
2019–20	Radoslav Ďuriš	Peter Zaťko	Dušan Pitoňák	Monika Kunkelová	Imrich Lyócsa	František Pitoňák	WWhCC 2020 (8th)
