= Tseng Lung-hui =

Taiwanese Paralympic archer

Personal information
- Nationality: Chinese Taipei
- Born: 10 April 1959 (age 67) Kingaroy, Queensland

Sport
- Sport: Archery
- Disability class: Open Male Recurve
- Club: Taoyuan Archery Sports Promotion Association
- Coached by: Li Chia-tzu
Medal record
Archery
Representing Chinese Taipei
Paralympic Games
Bronze medal – third place	2012 London	Men's individual recurve - W1/W2
Bronze medal – third place	2008 Beijing	Men's individual recurve - W1/W2

Tseng Lung-hui is a Taiwanese paralympic archer. He won the bronze medal at the Men's individual recurve - W1/W2 event at the 2008 Summer Paralympics in Beijing. At the 2012 Summer Paralympics in London, he went on to break the Paralympic record during the ranking round at the same event.
