= Taras Chopyk =

Ukrainian footballer and coach (born 1972)

Personal information
- Date of birth: 2 February 1972 (age 54)
- Place of birth: Lviv, Ukrainian SSR, Soviet Union
- Height: 1.80 m (5 ft 11 in)
- Position: Goalkeeper

Youth career
- 1989–1991: Karpaty Lviv

Senior career*
Years	Team	Apps	(Gls)
1989–1992	Karpaty Lviv	0	(0)
1992–1996	Hazovyk Komarno	149	(2)
1996–1999	Volyn Lutsk	81	(2)
2000–2003	Polihraftekhnika Oleksandriya	76	(0)
2002	→ Anzhi Makhachkala (loan)	0	(0)
2003–2004	Nyva Vinnytsia	17	(0)
2004	Oleksandriya	11	(0)
2005–2007	Dnipro Cherkasy	61	(0)
2007–2010	Simurq	47	(0)
Total		442	(4)

Managerial career
- 2013–2017: Naftan Novopolotsk (assistant)
- 2018: Veres Rivne (youth)
- 2019–2021: Naftan Novopolotsk
- 2021: Lviv (assistant)
- 2021: Lviv (interim)
- * Club domestic league appearances and goals

Taras Chopyk (Ukrainian: Тарас Чопик; born 2 February 1972) is a Ukrainian football coach and former player who played as a goalkeeper.
