= Batmönkhiin Ganbold =

Mongolian cross-country skier (born 1991)

Batmönkhiin Ganbold (Mongolian: Батмөнхийн Ганболд, born 22 October 1991) is a cross-country skier who served as the flag-bearer for Mongolia at the 2014 and 2018 Winter Paralympics Parade of Nations.
