= Mario Esposito (archer) =

Italian Paralympic archer

Medal record

Archery

Representing Italy

Paralympic Games
Bronze medal – third place	2008 Beijing	Men's team recurve

Mario Esposito is an Italian paralympic archer. He won the bronze medal at the Men's team recurve event at the 2008 Summer Paralympics in Beijing.
