= Oscar De Pellegrin =

Italian Paralympic archer and sports shooter

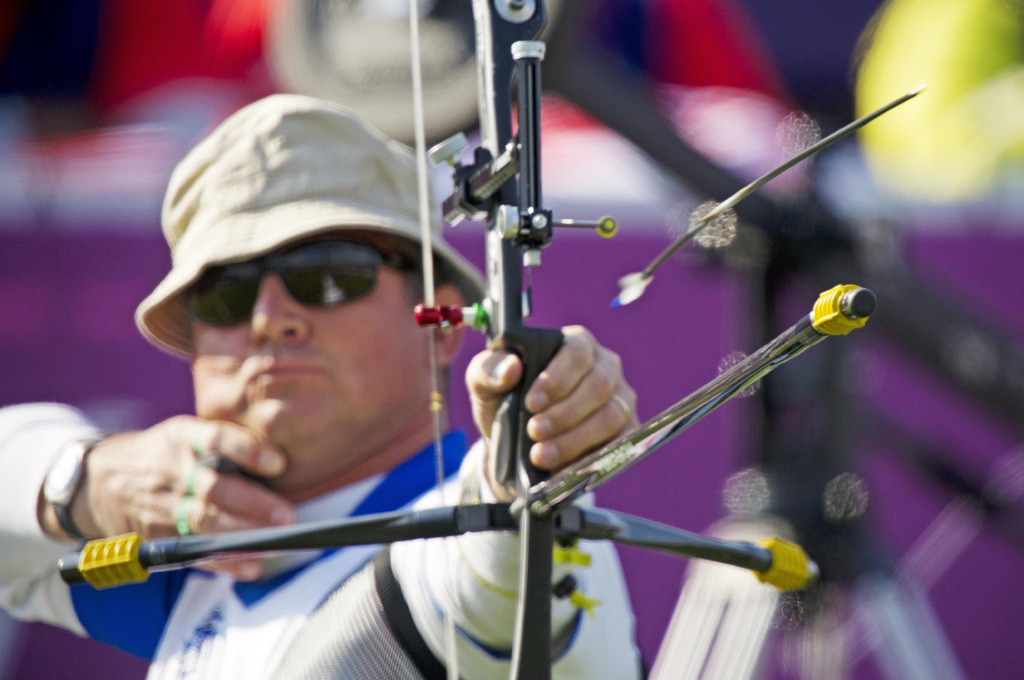
- De Pellegrin at 2012 Summer Paralympics

Mayor of Belluno
- Incumbent
- Assumed office 17 June 2022
- Preceded by: Jacopo Massaro

Personal details
- Born: 17 May 1963 (age 63) Belluno, Veneto, Italy
- Party: Centre-right independent
- Profession: Archer, sports manager

Oscar De Pellegrin
Personal information
- Nationality: Italian
- Born: 17 May 1963 (age 63) Belluno, Italy

Sport
- Country: Italy
- Sport: Paralympic archery Paralympic shooting
Medal record
Paralympic Games
Archery
Gold medal – first place	2000 Sydney	Teams Open
Gold medal – first place	2012 London	Individual Recurve W1/W2
Bronze medal – third place	2000 Sydney	Individual W2
Bronze medal – third place	2008 Beijing	Team Recurve Open
Shooting
Bronze medal – third place	1992 Barcelona	Olympic Match SH3
Bronze medal – third place	1996 Atlanta	English Match SH1

Oscar De Pellegrin (born 17 May 1963) is an Italian Paralympic archer and former Paralympic sports shooter. At the 2022 Italian local elections, he has been elected mayor of Belluno.

== Biography ==
His disability is due to a tractor accident at the family farm. He began in sport in 1990 due to a friend. He has been one of the main athletes of the "Nazionale Sport Disabili" (Disabled Italian National Team) for archery, and shooting. In the two sports he achieved 70 Italian titles, 11 Italian records and 4 world records.

In 2000, after winning the Team Gold Medal at the Paralympics, he's been decorated with the title of commendatore of the Italian Republic, while the CONI gave him their highest honorary medal, the "collare d'oro" (literally, the golden collar).

On the occasion of the journey of the Olympic Flame of Turin 2006, Oscar has been chosen as the last torch-bearer of Belluno's leg, and he lighted up the tripod in the city's main plaza. In 2012 he's been Italy's flag bearer at the Paralympic Games in London.

== Archery ==
Archery is the only sport where there are no distinctions between able-bodied and disabled athletes. Due to this peculiarity, in 1993 and 1994 Oscar became part of the Italian National Team. He represented Italy at the Paralympic Games in Barcelona (1992), Atlanta (1996), Sydney (2000), Athens (2004), Beijing, (2008) and London (2012), for a total of 6 editions. In 2009 he won a Guinness World Record together with Marco Vitale and Alberto Simonelli, shooting light bulbs.

Political offices
Preceded by Jacopo Massaro	Mayor of Belluno since 2022	Succeeded by Incumbent
