= Lee Hong-gu =

South Korean Paralympic archer

Medal record

Archery

Representing South Korea

Paralympic Games
Gold medal – first place	2008 Beijing	Men's team recurve

Lee Hong Gu (Korean: 이홍구) is a South Korean paralympic archer. He won the gold medal at the Men's team recurve event at the 2008 Summer Paralympics in Beijing.
