= Dambadondogiin Baatarjav =

Mongolian Paralympic archer (born 1961)

Personal information
- Born: 2 June 1961 (age 65)

Sport
- Country: Mongolia
- Sport: Archery
Medal record
Men's archery
Representing Mongolia
Paralympic Games
Gold medal – first place	2008 Beijing	Individual recurve standing

Dambadondogiin Baatarjav (Mongolian: Дамбадондогийн Баатаржав, born June 2, 1961) is a Mongolian professional archer. He competed for Mongolia in archery at the 2006 Asian Games. Baatarjav finished the 2006 Asian Games with a total of 1167 points compared to the 1332 points of South Korean Im Dong Hyun.

He won Mongolia's first-ever medal and first-ever gold medal in the Paralympic Games by winning the men's individual recurve standing event at the 2008 Beijing Paralympic Games.
