= LAF2 =

Les Autres sport classification

LA2 is a Les Autres sport classification is an wheelchair sport classification for a sportsperson with a disability that impacts their locomotor function. People in this class have severe locomotor issues with all four limbs as a result of loss of muscle strength or spasticity to a lesser degree than LAF1 or have severe locomotor issues in three of their limbs. They have moderate sitting balance, but good sitting balance while throwing.

Internationally, governance for this sport is handled by IWAS, following the 2005 merger of ISMWSF and ISOD. Classification is handled nationally by relevant national organizations. Sports they can participate in include sitting volleyball, powerlifting, athletics, archery, and equestrian.

== Definition ==
LAF2 is an Les Autres sports classification. Sportspeople in this class use wheelchairs on a regular basis as a result of reduced muscle function. They have low to moderate levels of balance issues while sitting, but maintain overall good balance from that position. They have normal arm function. Medically, this class includes people with severe hemiplegia, and paralysis of one limb while having deformations in two other limbs. Functionally, this means they have severe impairment of three limbs, or all four limbs but to a lesser degree than LAF1. In terms of functional classification, this means the sportsperson uses a wheelchair, has moderate sitting balance, reduced limb function in their throwing limb but has good sitting balance while throwing. For the 1984 Summer Paralympics, LAF2 was defined by the Games organizers as, "Wheelchair bound with normal function in throwing arm and poor to no sitting balance."

== Governance ==
Les Autres sport classification was originally created and then governed by the International Sports Organization for the Disabled (ISOD). Currently, classification is overseen by IWAS, having taken over this role following the 2005 merger of ISMWSF and ISOD.

National sport organizations handle classification on the national level. In the United Kingdom, this is the British Amputee and Les Autres Sports Association. In the United States, this is the United States Les Autres Sports Association. The classification system used in the United States has generally matched the international norms, though in track in field there have been five wheelchair classes and five ambulatory classes for Les Autres sportspeople. In Australia, Wheelchair Sports Australia was the governing body for classification for Les Autres sportspeople, with Disability Sports Australia taking over the role following the 2003 merger of Australian Sports Organisation for the Disabled (ASOD), Cerebral Palsy Australian Sports and Recreation Federation (CPASRF) and Wheelchair Sports Australia (WSA).

== Sports ==
=== Athletics ===
People in this class compete in F53. Athletes in this class have normal functioning in their throwing arm. While throwing, they can generally maintain good balance. At the 1984 Summer Paralympics, LAF1, LAF2 and LAF3 track athletes had the 60 meters and 400 meter distances on the program. There was a large range of sportspeople with different disabilities in this class at the 1984 Summer Paralympics.

=== Other sports ===
Les Autres competitors can also participate in sitting volleyball. In the past, the sport had a classification system and they were assigned to one of these classes. The rules were later changed to be inclusive of anyone, including Les Autres players, who meet the minimum disability requirement. Powerlifting is another sport open to people from this class where they compete against others with minimal disability requirements and are segregated based on weight. This sport is open to swimmers from this class. For swimming with the most severe disabilities at the 1984 Summer Paralympics, floating devices and a swimming coach in the water swimming next to the Paralympic competitor were allowed. Para-equestrian is another sport open to people from this class. Because they are use a wheelchair, LAF3 riders may be in Grade 1. This grade is typically for people with cerebral palsy, les autres and spinal cord injuries who have severe levels of disability. Archery is another option. LAF2 classified athletes compete in ARW1 or ARW2.
