= LAF1 =

Les Autres sport classification

LA1 is a Les Autres sport classification is an wheelchair sport classification for a sportsperson with a disability that impacts their locomotor function. People in this class have severe locomotor issues with all four limbs as a result of loss of muscle strength or spasticity. This also impacts their dominant throwing arm. They also have poor sitting balance.

Internationally, governance for this sport is handled by IWAS, following the 2005 merger of ISMWSF and ISOD. Classification is handled nationally by relevant national organizations. Sports they can participate in include sitting volleyball, powerlifting, athletics, archery, and equestrian.

== Definition ==
LAF1 is an Les Autres sports classification. Sportspeople in this class use wheelchairs on a regular basis as a result of reduced muscle function. ACSM's Primary Care Sports Medicine defines LAF1 as a medical class as "[s]evere involvement of the four limbs -- for example, MS, muscular dystrophy (MD), juvenile rheumatoid arthritis (JRA) with contractures" As a functional class, ACSM's Primary Care Sports Medicine defines LAF1 as "use of wheelchair with reduced function of muscle strength and/or spasticity in throwing arm, and poor sitting balance." Medically, this class includes people with severe multiple sclerosis, muscular dystrophy, and juvenile rheumatoid arthritis with contractures. This means they have severe issues with all four limbs. In terms of functional classification, this means the sportsperson uses a wheelchair, has poor sitting balance and has reduced strength or spasticity in their throwing arm. For the 1984 Summer Paralympics, LAF1 was defined by the Games organizers as, "Wheelchair bound. Reduced functions of muscle strength, and/or spasticity in throwing arm. Poor sitting balance."

Sportspeople with muscular dystrophy in this class have a number of factors that can make sports participation difficult. This includes poor pulmonary function, and potentially having restrictive lung disease values.

== Governance ==
Les Autres sport classification was originally created and then governed by the International Sports Organization for the Disabled (ISOD). Currently, classification is overseen by IWAS, having taken over this role following the 2005 merger of ISMWSF and ISOD.

National sport organizations handle classification on the national level. In the United Kingdom, this is the British Amputee and Les Autres Sports Association. In the United States, this is the United States Les Autres Sports Association. The classification system used in the United States has generally matched the international norms, though in track in field there have been five wheelchair classes and five ambulatory classes for Les Autres sportspeople. In Australia, Wheelchair Sports Australia was the governing body for classification for Les Autres sportspeople, with Disability Sports Australia taking over the role following the 2003 merger of Australian Sports Organisation for the Disabled (ASOD), Cerebral Palsy Australian Sports and Recreation Federation (CPASRF) and Wheelchair Sports Australia (WSA).

== Sports ==
=== Athletics ===
In athletics, LAF1 competitors compete in F51, F52 and F53 events. F51, F52 and F53 are wheelchair athletics classes. They have functionality issues in throwing events as a result of mobility issues or spasticity in their throwing arm. At the 1984 Summer Paralympics, LAF1, LAF2 and LAF3 track athletes had the 60 meters and 400 meter distances on the program. There was a large range of sportspeople with different disabilities in this class at the 1984 Summer Paralympics.

=== Other sports ===
This sport is open to swimmers from this class. For swimming with the most severe disabilities at the 1984 Summer Paralympics, floating devices and a swimming coach in the water swimming next to the Paralympic competitor were allowed. Les Autres competitors can also participate in sitting volleyball. In the past, the sport had a classification system and they were assigned to one of these classes. The rules were later changed to be inclusive of anyone, including Les Autres players, who meet the minimum disability requirement. Powerlifting is another sport open to people from this class where they compete against others with minimal disability requirements and are segregated based on weight. Para-equestrian is open to people from this class. Because they use a wheelchair chair, LAF3 riders may be in Grade 1. This grade is typically for people with cerebral palsy, les autres and spinal cord injuries who have severe levels of disability. Archery is another option. LAF1 classified athletes compete in ARW1.
