= LAF4 =

Les Autres sport classification

LA4 is a Les Autres sport classification is an ambulatory sport classification for a sportsperson with a disability that impacts their locomotor function. People in this class may or may not uses crutches and/or braces on a daily basis. They have some issues with balance and reduced function in their upper limbs.

Internationally, governance for this sport is handled by IWAS, following the 2005 merger of ISMWSF and ISOD. Classification is handled nationally by relevant national organizations. ports open to people in this class include archery, athletics, equestrian, and CP football.

== Definition ==
LAF4 is an Les Autres sports classification. This is an ambulant class for people who have difficulty moving or severe balance problems. They may use crutches on a daily basis. They have reduced upper limb functionality. Medically, this class includes people with contracture/ankylosis in joints of one limb and limited function in another limb. It means they have limited function in two limbs but to a lesser extent than LAF3. In terms of functional classification, this means the sportsperson is ambulatory with or without crutches and braces, has balance problems and reduced function in their throwing arm. For the 1984 Summer Paralympics, LAF4 sportspeople were described by the Games organizers as "ambulant, with or without crutches and/or braces. They had weakness in the dominant arm, causing reduced function."

== Governance ==
Les Autres sport classification was originally created and then governed by the International Sports Organization for the Disabled (ISOD). Currently, classification is overseen by IWAS, having taken over this role following the 2005 merger of ISMWSF and ISOD.

National sport organizations handle classification on the national level. In the United Kingdom, this is the British Amputee and Les Autres Sports Association. In the United States, this is the United States Les Autres Sports Association. The classification system used in the United States has generally matched the international norms, though in track in field there have been five wheelchair classes and five ambulatory classes for Les Autres sportspeople. In Australia, Wheelchair Sports Australia was the governing body for classification for Les Autres sportspeople, with Disability Sports Australia taking over the role following the 2003 merger of Australian Sports Organisation for the Disabled (ASOD), Cerebral Palsy Australian Sports and Recreation Federation (CPASRF) and Wheelchair Sports Australia (WSA).

== Sports ==
=== Athletics ===
In some cases, people in this class can compete in the F58 wheelchair field event class. They have reduced functionality in their throwing arm. Competitors in this class may also compete in T46. This is a standing class for people an upper limb deficiency impacting their joints impacting one or both arms.

At the 1984 Summer Paralympics, LAF4, LAF5 and LAF6 track athletes had the 100 meters and 1,500 meters on their program. In field events, they had shot put, discus, javelin and club throws. No jumping events were on the program for these classes. There was a large range of sportspeople with different disabilities in this class at the 1984 Summer Paralympics.

=== Other sports ===
Archery is one of the sports open to people in this class. LAF4 classified athletes compete in ARST. People in this class can compete while sitting on a high stool, but their feet must be touching the ground while shooting. People in this class sometimes participate in cerebral palsy soccer. In CP soccer, rules requiring a CP5 player on the field led to wider adoption of Les Autres classes into the CP classification system to facilitate comparable participation. Para-equestrian is another sport open to people in this class. Because they are ambulant, LAF5 riders may be in Grade 1 or Grade 4. Grade 1 is typically for people with cerebral palsy, les autres and spinal cord injuries who have severe levels of disability. Grade 4 is typically for people with normal lower limb functionality, but some other disability like vision impairment, or impairment in a leg or arm.
