= LAF6 =

Les Autres sport classification

LA6 is a Les Autres sport classification is an ambulatory sport classification for a sportsperson with a disability that impacts their locomotor function. People in this class have a minimal locomotor disability that tends to impact one of their upper limbs or knees. The class includes people with arthritis and osteoporosis, or ankylosis of the knee.

Internationally, governance for this sport is handled by IWAS, following the 2005 merger of ISMWSF and ISOD. Classification is handled nationally by relevant national organizations. Sports open to people in this classification include archery, athletics and equestrian.

== Definition ==
LAF6 is an Les Autres sports classification. It is an ambulant class for people with minimal issues with trunk and lower limb functionality. People in this class have impairments in one upper limb. Medically, this class includes people with arthritis and osteoporosis, or ankylosis of the knee. In practice, this means minimal disability. In terms of functional classification, this means the sportsperson is ambulatory with good upper limb functionality, and minimal trunk or lower limb functionality. For the 1984 Summer Paralympics, LAF6 was defined by the Games organizers as, "Ambulant with normal upper extremity function in throwing arm and minimal trunk or lower extremity disability. A participant in this class must be able to demonstrate a locomotor disability which clearly gives a him/her a disadvantage in throwing events compared to able-bodied sports men/women." For the 1984 Summer Paralympics, LAF6 sportspeople were described by the Games organizers as "had minimal trunk or lower limb disability."

== Governance ==
Les Autres sport classification was originally created and then governed by the International Sports Organization for the Disabled (ISOD). Currently, classification is overseen by IWAS, having taken over this role following the 2005 merger of ISMWSF and ISOD.

National sport organizations handle classification on the national level. In the United Kingdom, this is the British Amputee and Les Autres Sports Association. In the United States, this is the United States Les Autres Sports Association. The classification system used in the United States has generally matched the international norms, though in track in field there have been five wheelchair classes and five ambulatory classes for Les Autres sportspeople. In Australia, Wheelchair Sports Australia was the governing body for classification for Les Autres sportspeople, with Disability Sports Australia taking over the role following the 2003 merger of Australian Sports Organisation for the Disabled (ASOD), Cerebral Palsy Australian Sports and Recreation Federation (CPASRF) and Wheelchair Sports Australia (WSA).

== Sports ==
=== Athletics ===
LAF6 competitors can be classified into several athletics classes including F46. While athletes in this class have minimal functionality problems with their throwing arm, they have an impairment that impacts their non-throwing arm. At the 1984 Summer Paralympics, LAF4, LAF5 and LAF6 track athletes had the 100 meters and 1,500 meters on their program. In field events, they had shot put, discus, javelin and club throws. No jumping events were on the program for these classes. There was a large range of sportspeople with different disabilities in this class at the 1984 Summer Paralympics.

=== Other sports ===
Archery is a sport open to people in this class. LAF6 classified athletes compete in ARST. People in this class can compete while sitting on a high stool, but their feet must be touching the ground while shooting. Para-equestrian is another option. Because they are ambulant, LAF5 riders may be in Grade 1 or Grade 4. Grade 1 is typically for people with cerebral palsy, les autres and spinal cord injuries who have severe levels of disability. Grade 4 is typically for people with normal lower limb functionality, but some other disability like vision impairment, or impairment in a leg or arm. In para-triathlon, because they can use a standard bicycle, they can be classified TRI4.
