= F9 (classification) =

Wheelchair sport classification

F9 is a wheelchair sport classification. It is largely used as a national classification in the United States for athletics only, and replaced the standing F8 class. It is the only one of the nine wheelchair sport classes that is for standing competitors. The class has been governed by Disabled Sports USA, Wheelchair Sports, USA and USA Track and Field. Sports open to this class include athletics, wheelchair softball and cycling.

== Definition ==
F9 is a standing wheelchair sport class used in the United States. It is sometimes referred to as Standing F8. This is a standing class for people with neurological disorders, the only one of the nine wheelchair sport classes for standing competitors. The level of spinal cord injury for this class is largely confined to the sacral region, or involves people who have incomplete lesions at a slightly higher level. This means they can sometimes bear weight on their legs. In 2003, Disabled Sports USA defined this class as, "Is a standing class but not more than 70 points in the lower limbs. Able to maintain Balance when in a challenged standing position. Internationally this class would compete in the 42,43,44 class with other ambulatory classes. Justification: Internationally there is no longer a wheelchair standing class." In some competitions, F8 and F9 classes have been merged as F9, or they compete as F42, F43, or F44.

== Governance ==
The F9 class is a domestic wheelchair sport class, used almost exclusively in the United States. This class was governed by Disabled Sports USA and Wheelchair Sports, USA during the 2000s. It was later governed by USA Track and Field.

== Sports ==
=== Athletics ===
Under the IPC Athletics classification system, the F9 class competes in F42, F43 and F44. F9 competitors were moved out of the international F50s classes because there was no longer a perceived need for a standing wheelchair class. Field events open to this class have included shot put, discus and javelin.

In javelin, F9 throwers throw the javelin from a standing position and use a javelin that weighs .8 kilograms (1.8 lb). A study of javelin throwers in 2003 found that F9 throwers have angular speeds of the shoulder girdle similar to that of F4, F5, F6, F7, F8 and F3 throwers. Throwers or all types in this class use a stopboard, making them the only wheelchair class that requires the use of one. In junior events in the United States, the F9 class does not participate in the pentathlon, while F3 to F8 do.

=== Other sports ===
On a junior level in the United States, other sports this class can participate in on a national level include wheelchair softball. The classification is also used in cycling in the USA.
