= F3 (classification) =

Wheelchair sport classification

F3, also T3 and SP3, is a wheelchair sport classification that corresponds to the neurological level C8. Historically, it was known as 1C Complete, and 1B Incomplete. F3 sportspeople have functional issues related to the muscles in their throwing arm, though they have enough control over their fingers to grip a throwing implement normally. They have no functional trunk control.

There are comparable classes in other sports. In swimming, these include S3, SB3, S4 and S5. In wheelchair basketball, this includes 1 point player. The process for classification into this class has a medical and functional classification process. This process is often sport specific.

== Definition ==
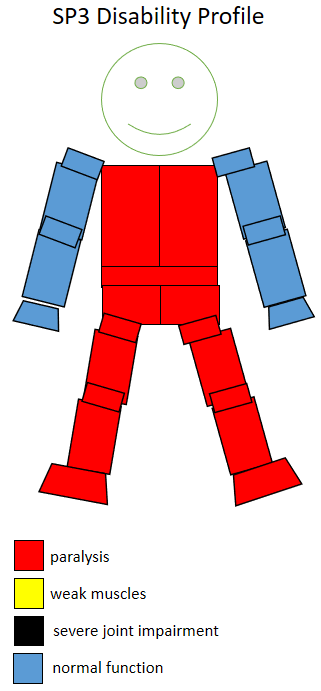
Functional profile of a wheelchair sportsperson in the F3 class.

This is wheelchair sport classification that corresponds to the neurological level C8. In the past, this class was known as 1C Complete, and 1B Incomplete.

In 2002, USA Track & Field defined this class as, "These athletes have normal or nearly normal upper limb function. There is no active trunk movement, although the trunk may move with the pushing action; otherwise the trunk is usually lying on the tucked up legs. They tend to interrupt pushing movements to steer, then have difficulty resuming the pushing position. When braking, the trunk stays close to the pushing position. Neurological level: T1-T7."

=== Neurological ===
Disabled Sports USA defined the neurological definition of this class in 2003 as C8. The location of lesions on different vertebrae tend to be associated with disability levels and functionality issues. C8 is associated with finger flexors. T1 is associated with finger abductors.

=== Anatomical ===
Disabled Sports USA defined the anatomical definition of this class in 2003 as, "Have full power at elbow and wrist joints. Have full or almost full power of finger flexion and extension. Have functional but not normal intrinsic muscles of the hand (demonstrable wasting)." People with a lesion at C8 have an impairment that effects the use of their hands and lower arm.

People with spinal injuries at T6 or higher are more likely to develop Autonomic dysreflexia (AD). It also sometimes rarely effects people with injuries at T7 and T8. The condition causes over-activity of the autonomic nervous system, and can suddenly onset when people are playing sports. Some of the symptoms include nausea, high blood pressure, a pounding headache, flushed face, profuse sweating, a lower heart rate or a nasal congestion. If left untreated, it can cause a stroke. Players in some sports like wheelchair rugby are encouraged to be particularly on guard for AD symptoms.

=== Functional ===
Disabled Sports USA defined the functional definition of this class in 2003 as, "Have nearly normal grip with non-throwing arm." They have full functional control or close to full functional control over the muscles in their fingers, but may have issues with control in their wrist and hand. People in this class have a total respiratory capacity of 79% compared to people without a disability.

== Governance ==
In general, classification for spinal cord injuries and wheelchair sport is overseen by International Wheelchair and Amputee Sports Federation (IWAS), having taken over this role following the 2005 merger of ISMWSF and ISOD. From the 1950s to the early 2000s, wheelchair sport classification was handled International Stoke Mandeville Games Federation (ISMGF).

Some sports have classification managed by other organizations. In the case of athletics, classification is handled by IPC Athletics. Wheelchair rugby classification has been managed by the International Wheelchair Rugby Federation since 2010. Lawn bowls is handled by International Bowls for the Disabled. Wheelchair fencing is governed by IWAS Wheelchair Fencing (IWF). The International Paralympic Committee manages classification for a number of spinal cord injury and wheelchair sports including alpine skiing, biathlon, cross country skiing, ice sledge hockey, powerlifting, shooting, swimming, and wheelchair dance.

Some sports specifically for people with disabilities, like race running, have two governing bodies that work together to allow different types of disabilities to participate. Race running is governed by both the CPISRA and IWAS, with IWAS handling sportspeople with spinal cord related disabilities.

Classification is also handled at the national level or at the national sport specific level. In the United States, this has been handled by Wheelchair Sports, USA (WSUSA) who managed wheelchair track, field, slalom, and long-distance events. For wheelchair basketball in Canada, classification is handled by Wheelchair Basketball Canada.

== History ==
Early on in this classes history, the class had a different name and was based on medical classification and originally intended for athletics. During the 1960s and 1970s, classification involved being examined in a supine position on an examination table, where multiple medical classifiers would often stand around the player, poke and prod their muscles with their hands and with pins. The system had no built in privacy safeguards and players being classified were not insured privacy during medical classification nor with their medical records.

During the late 1960s, people oftentimes tried to cheat classification to get in classified more favorably. The group most likely to try to cheat at classification were wheelchair basketball players with complete spinal cord injuries located at the high thoracic transection of the spine. Starting in the 1980s and going into the 1990s, this class began to be more defined around functional classification instead of a medical one.

== Sports ==
=== Athletics ===
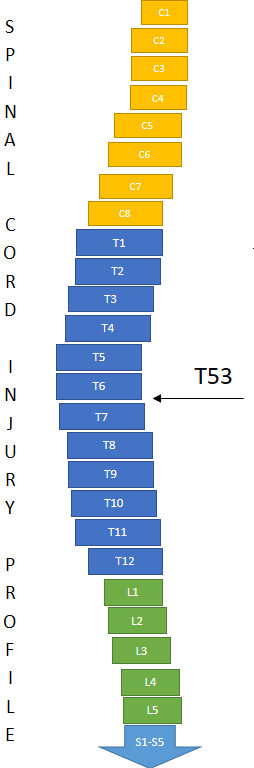
Visualization of where on the spinal cord an injury exists to be classified as T53.

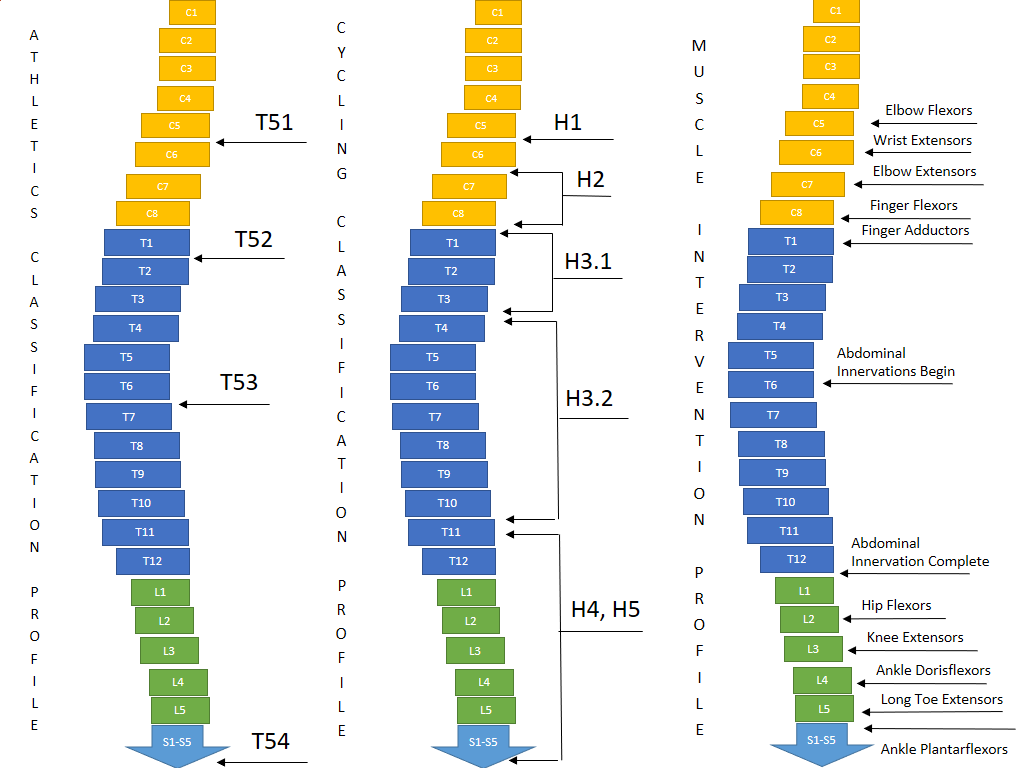
Comparing key muscle innervations for spinal cord levels compared to cycling and athletics classifications.

Under the IPC Athletics classification system, this class competes in F53. The class differs from T54 because T54 sportspeople have better trunk function and better function and more strength in their throwing arm. A person in this class with an additional impairment in the elbow of their throwing arm may find themselves classified as F52 instead. Athletes in this class who good trunk control and mobility have an advantage over athletes in the same class who have less functional trunk control and mobility. This functional difference can cause different performance results within the same class, with discus throwers with more control in a class able to throw the discus further. Wheelchair racers in this class frequently are much faster than their able-bodied counterparts.

Field events open to this class have included shot put, discus and javelin. In pentathlon, the events for this class have included Shot, Javelin, 100m, Discus, 800m. They throw from a seated position. The javelin they throw weighs .6 kilograms (1.3 lb). The shot put used by women in this class weighs less than the traditional one at 3 kilograms (6.6 lb). In the United States, people in this class are allowed to use strapping on the non-throwing hand as a way to anchor themselves to the chair.

There are performance differences and similarities between this class and other wheelchair classes. A study of javelin throwers in 2003 found that F3 throwers have angular speeds of the shoulder girdle similar to that of F4, F5, F6, F7, F8 and F9 throwers. A 1999 study found for people in the F2, F3 and F4 classes in the discus, elbow flexion and shoulder horizontal abduction are equally important variables in the speed at which they release the discus. For F2, F3 and F4 discus throwers, the discus tends to be below shoulder height and the forearm level is generally above elbow height at the moment of release of the discus. F2 and F4 discus throwers have limited shoulder girdle range of motion. F2, F3 and F4 discus throwers have good sitting balance while throwing. F5, F6 and F7 discus throwers have greater angular speed of the shoulder girdle during release of the discus than the lower number classes of F2, F3 and F4.

A study of was done comparing the performance of athletics competitors at the 1984 Summer Paralympics. It found there was little significant difference in performance in distance between women in 1A (SP1, SP2) and 1B (SP3) in the club throw. It found there was little significant difference in performance in distance between men in 1A (SP1, SP2) and 1B (SP3) in the club throw. It found there was little significant difference in performance in distance between men in 1A (SP1, SP2) and 1B (SP3) in the discus. It found there was little significant difference in performance in distance between men in 1A (SP1, SP2) and 1B (SP3) in the javelin. It found there was little significant difference in performance in distance between men in 1A (SP1, SP2) and 1B (SP3) in the shot put. It found there was little significant difference in performance in times between women in 1A (SP1, SP2) and 1B (SP3) in the 60 meters. It found there was little significant difference in performance in times between men in 1A (SP1, SP2) and 1B (SP3) in the 60 meters. It found there was little significant difference in performance in times between women in 1A (SP1, SP2) and 1B (SP3) in the slalom. It found there was little significant difference in performance in distance between women in 1B (SP3) and 1C (SP3, SP4) in the shot put. It found there was little significant difference in performance in time between women in 1B (SP3) and 1C (SP3, SP4) in the 60 meter dash. It found there was little significant difference in performance in distance between women in 1A (SP1, SP2), 1B (SP3) and 1C (SP3, SP4) in the discus. It found there was little significant difference in performance in distance between women in 1A (SP1, SP2), 1B (SP3) and 1C (SP3, SP4) in the club throw. It found there was little significant difference in performance in time between women in 1C (SP3, SP4) and 2 (SP4) in the 60 m dash. It found there was little significant difference in performance in distance between men in 1C (SP3, SP4) and 2 (SP4) in the shot put. It found there was little significant difference in performance in time between men in 1C (SP3, SP4) and 2 (SP4) in the slalom. It found there was little significant difference in performance in distance between women in 1C (SP3, SP4), 2 (SP4) and 3 (SP4, SP5) in the javelin. It found there was little significant difference in performance in time between women in 1C (SP3, SP4), 2 (SP4) and 3 (SP4, SP5) in the 60 meters.

=== Cycling ===
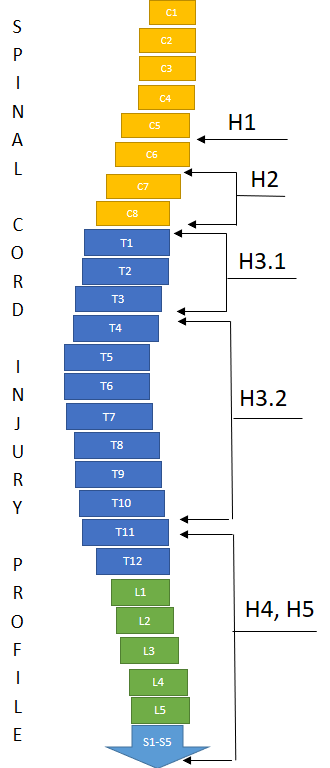
Cycling classification for spinal cord injuries for H1, H2, H3 and H4

F3 sportspeople can participate in cycling. Competitors from this class compete in H3. This class is divided into two subclasses, both of which SP3 cyclists can be classified into. H3.1 cyclists from this are paraplegics with impairments corresponding to a complete lesion from T1 to T3. H3.2 cyclists are paraplegics with impairments corresponding to a complete lesion from T4 to T10. Factoring is used in cycling to allow multiple classes and genders to compete against each other. UCI factoring for 2014 with H4 and H5 men as 100% on the factoring. Against this factoring, H4 women are 87.71%. When H3 men are set at 100%, H4 women are 90.19%. In track events, SP3 men in H3 are significantly faster than SP2 women in H2. SP3 women are about 4 seconds faster than SP4 women per lap. SP3 and SP4 men are within 1 second of each other time wise per lap.

=== Rowing ===
Rowing is one of the sporting options open to people in this class. Currently, people with a spinal cord injury at T12 level compete in AS. This class is for people who use their arms and shoulders to row. Rowers in this class may be able to grasp the oar with their hand but have little control of their hands. In 1991, the first internationally accepted adaptive rowing classification system was established and put into use. People from this class were initially classified as Q2, for people with lesions at C7-T1.

=== Swimming ===
Swimmers in this class compete in a number of IPC swimming classes. These include S3, SB3, S4 and S5. Swimming classification is done based on a total points system, with a variety of functional and medical tests being used as part of a formula to assign a class. Part of this test involves the Adapted Medical Research Council (MRC) scale. For upper trunk extension, C8 complete are given 0 points.

People in SB3 tend to be incomplete tetraplegics below C7, complete paraplegics around T1 - T5, or complete paraplegics at T1 - T8 with surgical rods put in their spinal column from T4 to T6. These rods impact their lumbar function and their balance. S4 swimmers tend to be tetraplegics with complete lesions below C8 but have good finger extension, or they are incomplete tetraplegics below C7. These S4 swimmers are able to use their hands and wrists to gain propulsion in the water but have some limits because of lack of full finger control. Because they have no to minimal trunk control, they have leg drag. Their starts are most frequently in the water, and they make turns and start by pushing off the wall using their hands. S5 swimmers with spinal cord injuries tend to be complete paraplegics with lesions below T1 to T8, or incomplete tetraplegics below C8 who have decent trunk control. These swimmers have full use of their arms and are able to use their arms, hands and fingers to gain propulsion in the catch phase of swimming. Because they have minimal trunk control, their hips tend to be a bit lower in the water and they have leg drag. They either start in the water or start from a sitting dive position. They use their hands to make turns.

For swimming with the most severe disabilities at the 1984 Summer Paralympics, floating devices and a swimming coach in the water swimming next to the Paralympic competitor were allowed. A study of was done comparing the performance of athletics competitors at the 1984 Summer Paralympics. It found there was little significant difference in performance times between women in 1A (SP1, SP2), 1B (SP3), and 1C (SP3, SP4) in the 25m breaststroke. It found there was little significant difference in performance times between women in 1A, 1B, and 1C in the 25m backstroke. It found there was little significant difference in performance times between women in 1A, 1B, and 1C in the 25m freestyle. It found there was little significant difference in performance times between men in 1A, 1B, and 1C in the 25m backstroke. It found there was little significant difference in performance times between men in 1A, 1B, and 1C in the 25m freestyle. It found there was little significant difference in performance times between men in 1A, and 1B in the 25m breaststroke.

=== Wheelchair basketball ===
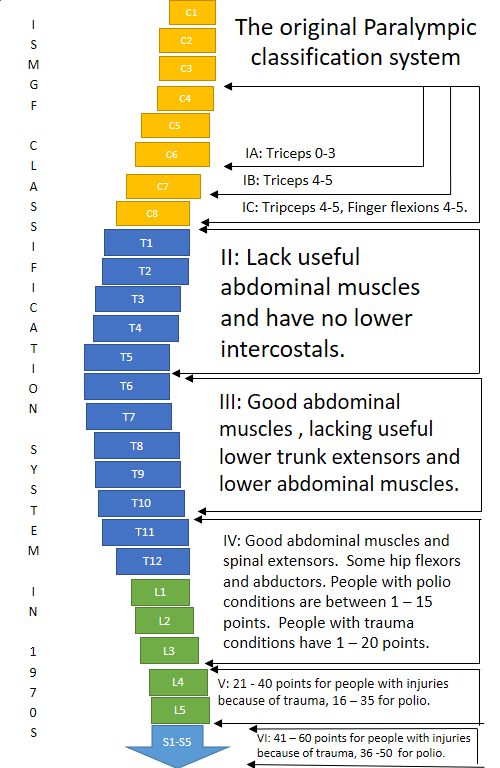
The original ISMGF classification system used at early Paralympic Games.

The original wheelchair basketball classification system in 1966 had 5 classes: A, B, C, D, S. Each class was worth so many points. A was worth 1, B and C were worth 2. D and S were worth 3 points. A team could have a maximum of 12 points on the floor. This system was the one in place for the 1968 Summer Paralympics. Class A was for T1-T9 complete. Class B was for T1-T9 incomplete. Class C was for T10-L2 complete. Class D was for T10-L2 incomplete. Class S was for Cauda equina paralysis. This class would have been part of Class A or Class B.

From 1969 to 1973, a classification system designed by Australian Dr. Bedwell was used. This system used some muscle testing to determine which class incomplete paraplegics should be classified in. It used a point system based on the ISMGF classification system. Class IA, IB and IC were worth 1 point. Class II for people with lesions between T1-T5 and no balance were also worth 1 point. Class III for people with lesions at T6-T10 and have fair balance were worth 1 point. Class IV was for people with lesions at T11-L3 and good trunk muscles. They were worth 2 points. Class V was for people with lesions at L4 to L5 with good leg muscles. Class IV was for people with lesions at S1-S4 with good leg muscles. Class V and IV were worth 3 points. The Daniels/Worthington muscle test was used to determine who was in class V and who was class IV. Paraplegics with 61 to 80 points on this scale were not eligible. A team could have a maximum of 11 points on the floor. The system was designed to keep out people with less severe spinal cord injuries, and had no medical basis in many cases. This class would have been IB or IC.

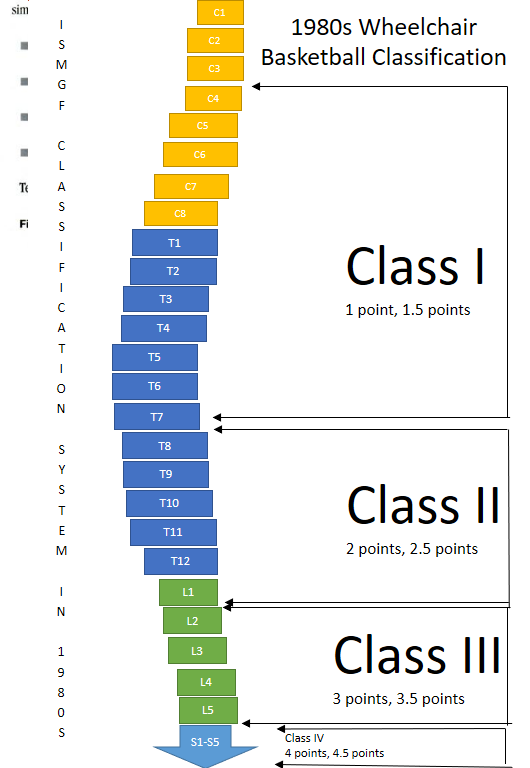
The wheelchair basketball classification system used during the 1980s was mostly functional, but had medical lesion based elements as a guideline. A maximum of 14 points was allowed on the floor at any time.

In 1982, wheelchair basketball finally made the move to a functional classification system internationally. While the traditional medical system of where a spinal cord injury was located could be part of classification, it was only one advisory component. This class would have been Class 1 at 1 or 1.5 points. They would probably be 1 point players under the current classification system.

=== Wheelchair fencing ===
Wheelchair fencing is another sport open to people in this class. Generally, people in this class are classified as 1B. They lack flexion in their fingers, and the weapon has to be strapped to their hand. For international IWF sanctioned competitions, classes are combined. 1A and 1B are combined, competing as Category C.

=== Other sports ===
One of the sports available to people in this class is archery. People in this class compete in ARW1 for people with loss of arm function. They can also be ARW2. This class is for people who have limited to good trunk function and normal functioning in their arms. It includes paraplegic archers, while ARW1 includes tetraplegic archers. People in this class participate can participate in sit skiing. In the United States, domestic competitions have used different classification than the one used internationally. Two groups are used instead of LW10 to LW12. Group 1 is for people from T5 to T10. Group 2 is for people with lesions above T5. Table tennis is another option. Players in this class compete typically compete in Grade 5, though it largely depends on the functioning of the rest of the lower body. This could result in them being put into Grade 3, Grade 4 or Grade 5. The cut off for Grade 5 typically depends on hip functionality.

Ten-pin bowling is another sport open to people in this class, where they compete in TPB8. People in this class do not have more than 70 points for functionality, have normal arm pitch for throwing and use a wheelchair. This class is also eligible to participate in electric wheelchair hockey. The sport has one class and is open to anyone with a spinal injury above T1.

== Getting classified ==
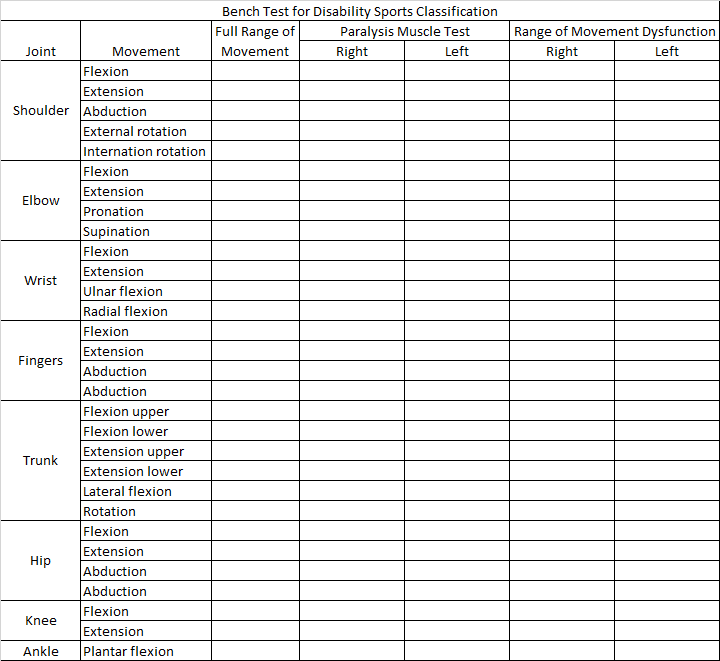
A standard bench press form used to for functional classification for wheelchair sportspeople.

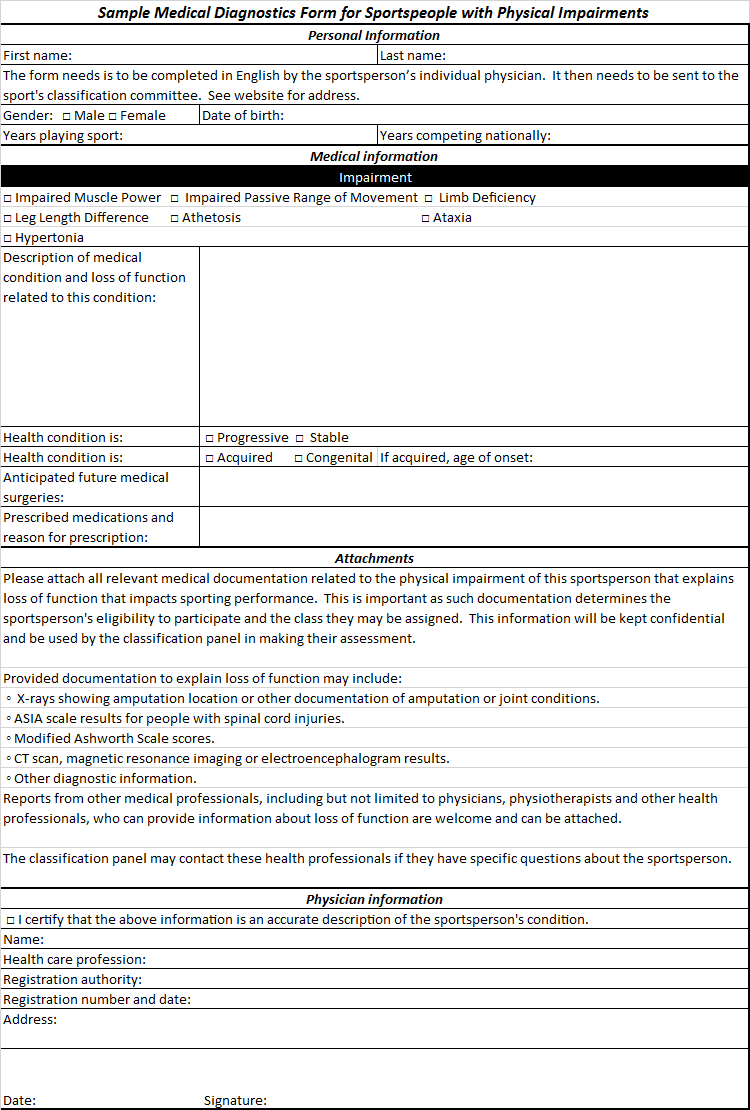
A sample medical classification form. Sportspeople would need some form of this sent to a classification panel.

Classification is often sport specific, and has two parts: a medical classification process and a functional classification process.

Medical classification for wheelchair sport can consist of medical records being sent to medical classifiers at the international sports federation. The sportsperson's physician may be asked to provide extensive medical information including medical diagnosis and any loss of function related to their condition. This includes if the condition is progressive or stable, if it is an acquired or congenital condition. It may include a request for information on any future anticipated medical care. It may also include a request for any medications the person is taking. Documentation that may be required my include X-rays, ASIA scale results, or Modified Ashworth Scale scores.

One of the standard means of assessing functional classification is the bench test, which is used in swimming, lawn bowls and wheelchair fencing. Using the Adapted Research Council (MRC) measurements, muscle strength is tested using the bench press for a variety of spinal cord related injuries with a muscle being assessed on a scale of 0 to 5. A 0 is for no muscle contraction. A 1 is for a flicker or trace of contraction in a muscle. A 2 is for active movement in a muscle with gravity eliminated. A 3 is for movement against gravity. A 4 is for active movement against gravity with some resistance. A 5 is for normal muscle movement.

Wheelchair fencing classification has 6 tests for functionality during classification, along with a bench test. Each test gives 0 to 3 points. A 0 is for no function. A 1 is for minimum movement. A 2 is for fair movement but weak execution. A 3 is for normal execution. The first test is an extension of the dorsal musculature. The second test is for lateral balance of the upper limbs. The third test measures trunk extension of the lumbar muscles. The fourth test measures lateral balance while holding a weapon. The fifth test measures the trunk movement in a position between that recorded in tests one and three, and tests two and four. The sixth test measures the trunk extension involving the lumbar and dorsal muscles while leaning forward at a 45-degree angle. In addition, a bench test is required to be performed.
