= SS2 =

SS2 or SS-2 may refer to:

- SS2, Petaling Jaya, a Malaysian neighbourhood
- SS2 (classification), a Les Autres sport classification
- Airframes Unlimited SS-2 Trainer, an American powered parachute design
- Pindad SS2, an Indonesian assault rifle made to replace the SS1
- USS Plunger (SS-2), one of the earliest submarines of the United States Navy
- R-2 (missile) (NATO reporting name: SS-2 Sibling), Soviet Union manufactured improvement of the V-2 rocket
- Scimitar SS2, a 1988 model of the Reliant Scimitar
- Setanta Sports 1 & 2 (SS1 & SS2), subscription based sports channels in the Republic of Ireland and Northern Ireland
- Short Circuit 2, a 1988 motion picture
- SpaceShipTwo, a suborbital, air-launched spaceplane for carrying space tourists
- SPARCstation 2, the Sun SPARCstation 2 workstation
- Serious Sam II, a 2005 first-person shooter
- System Shock 2, a 1999 first-person action role-playing game
- "SS2", a simple and quick way to refer to the eighth season of Fall Guys.
