= SS2 (classification) =

Les Autres sport classification

SS2 is a Les Autres sport classification ambulatory class for people with short stature. Eligible males have a standing height and arm length that added together are equal to or less than 200 centimetres (79 in). Eligible female have a standing height and arm length that added together are equal to or less than 190 centimetres (75 in). Internationally, governance for this sport is handled by IWAS, following the 2005 merger of ISMWSF and ISOD. Classification is handled nationally by relevant national organizations. People in this class can participate in a number of sports including athletics, swimming, and para-equestrian.

== Definition ==
SS2 is an Les Autres sports classification. This is a standing classification. Men in this class are 145 centimetres (57 in) tall or less, with an arm length equal to or less than 66 centimetres (26 in). When their standing height and arm length are added together, the distance is equal to or less than 200 centimetres (79 in). For women in this class, the same measurements are 137 centimetres (54 in), 63 centimetres (25 in) and 190 centimetres (75 in).

== Performance and physiology ==
There are generally two types of syndromes that cause short stature. One is disproportionate limb size on a normal size torso. The second is proportionate, where they are generally small for their average age. There are a variety of causes including skeletal dysplasia, chondrodystrophy, and growth hormone deficiencies. Short stature can cause a number of other disabilities including eye problems, joint defects, joint dislocation or limited range of movement.

== Governance ==
Les Autres sport classification was originally created and then governed by the International Sports Organization for the Disabled (ISOD). Currently, classification is overseen by IWAS, having taken over this role following the 2005 merger of ISMWSF and ISOD.

National sport organizations handle classification on the national level. In the United Kingdom, this is the British Amputee and Les Autres Sports Association. In the United States, this is the United States Les Autres Sports Association. The classification system used in the United States has generally matched the international norms, though in track in field there have been five wheelchair classes and five ambulatory classes for Les Autres sportspeople. In Australia, Wheelchair Sports Australia was the governing body for classification for Les Autres sportspeople, with Disability Sports Australia taking over the role following the 2003 merger of Australian Sports Organisation for the Disabled (ASOD), Cerebral Palsy Australian Sports and Recreation Federation (CPASRF) and Wheelchair Sports Australia (WSA).

== Sports ==
=== Athletics ===
The comparable SS2 class in IPC athletics is T41 and F41. In 2010, the IPC announced that they would release a new IPC Athletics Classification handbook that specifically dealt with physical impairments. This classification guide would be put into effect following the closing ceremony of the 2012 Summer Paralympics. One of these changes was creating a minimum age to compete in this class. Athletes needed to be at least 18 years old to compete. This was to prevent still growing children from competing in this class despite otherwise not having a disability.

=== Other sports ===
Powerlifting is one of the sports available to people in this class. Rather than be separated by disability type, people in this sport are separated based on weight classes. Swimming is another sport available to people in this class. SS1 swimmers may be found in several classes. These include S6. Another sport available to people in this class is para-equestrian. Because people in this class are often ambulant, LAF5 riders may be found in Grade 1 or Grade 4. Grade 1 is typically for people with cerebral palsy, les autres and spinal cord injuries who have severe levels of disability.
