= F7 (classification) =

Wheelchair sport classification

F7, also SP7, is a wheelchair sport classification that corresponds to the neurological level S1- S2. Historically, it has been referred to as Lower 5. It is characterized by people having their lower limb muscles strength and function impacted. People in the SP7 class generally have good sitting balance and some trunk movement backwards and forwards. One side may be stronger than the other.

Classification into this class is overseen by International Wheelchair and Amputee Sports Federation (IWAS). after having been originally handled International Stoke Mandeville Games Federation (ISMGF). Classification may also been done by an international sporting body, a national sports organization, or a national sport specific organization. Comparable classes for F7 include F57 in athletics, S5 or S10 in swimming, LTA in adaptive rowing and 4 point player in wheelchair basketball. The process for classification into this class has a medical and functional classification process. This process is often sport specific.

== Definition ==
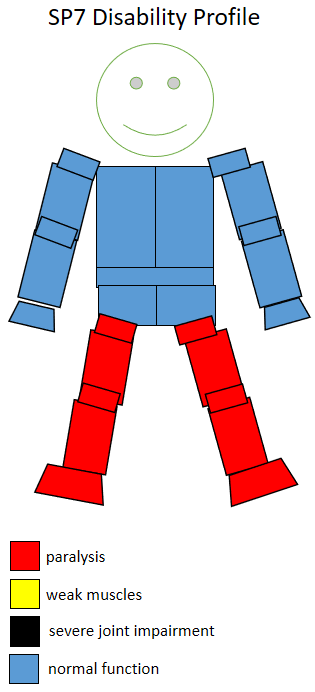
Functional profile of a wheelchair sportsperson in the F7 class.

F7 is wheelchair sport classification, that corresponds to the neurological level S1- S2. Historically, this class has been called Lower 5. In 2002, USA Track & Field defined this class as, " These athletes also have the ability to move side to side, so they can throw across their body. They usually can bend one hip backward to push the thigh into the chair, and can bend one ankle downward to push down with the foot. Neurological level: S1-S2."

=== Neurological ===
The neurological definition of for this class is S1 - S2. The location of lesions on different vertebrae tend to be associated with disability levels and functionality issues. S1 is associated with ankle plantar flexors.

=== Anatomical ===
People with a lesion at S1 have their hamstring and peroneal muscles effected. Functionally, they can bend their knees and lift their feet. They can walk on their own, though they may require ankle braces or orthopedic shoes. They can generally change in any physical activity. People with lesions at the L4 to S2 who are complete paraplegics may have motor function issues in their gluts and hamstrings. Their quadriceps are likely to be unaffected. They may be absent sensation below the knees and in the groin area.

=== Functional ===
Disabled Sports USA defined the functional definition of this class in 2003 as, "Have very good sitting balance and movements in the backwards and forwards plane. Usually have very good balance and movements towards one side (side to side movements) due to presence of one functional hip abductor, on the side that movement is towards. Usually can bend one hip backwards; i.e. push the thigh into the chair. Usually can bend one ankle downwards; ie. push the foot onto the foot plate. The side that is strong is important when considering how much it will help functional performance."

== Governance ==
In general, classification for spinal cord injuries and wheelchair sport is overseen by International Wheelchair and Amputee Sports Federation (IWAS), having taken over this role following the 2005 merger of ISMWSF and ISOD. From the 1950s to the early 2000s, wheelchair sport classification was handled International Stoke Mandeville Games Federation (ISMGF).

Some sports have classification managed by other organizations. In the case of athletics, classification is handled by IPC Athletics. The International Paralympic Committee manages classification for a number of spinal cord injury and wheelchair sports including alpine skiing, biathlon, cross country skiing, ice sledge hockey, powerlifting, shooting, swimming, and wheelchair dance.

Some sports specifically for people with disabilities, like race running, have two governing bodies that work together to allow different types of disabilities to participate. Classification is also handled at the national level or at the national sport specific level. In the United States, this has been handled by Wheelchair Sports, USA (WSUSA) who managed wheelchair track, field, slalom, and long-distance events. For wheelchair basketball in Canada, classification is handled by Wheelchair Basketball Canada.

== History ==
Early on in this classes history, the class had a different name and was based on medical classification and originally intended for athletics. During the 1960s and 1970s, classification involved being examined in a supine position on an examination table, where multiple medical classifiers would often stand around the player, poke and prod their muscles with their hands and with pins. The system had no built in privacy safeguards and players being classified were not insured privacy during medical classification nor with their medical records. This period was also one that saw people oftentimes trying to cheat classification to get in classified more favorably. Starting in the 1980s and going into the 1990s, this class began to be more defined around functional classification instead of a medical one.

== Sports ==
=== Athletics ===
Under the IPC Athletics classification system, this class competes in F57. Field events open to this class have included shot put, discus and javelin. In pentathlon, the events for this class have included Shot, Javelin, 200m, Discus, 1500m. F7 throwers compete from a seated position. The javelin they throw weighs .6 kilograms (1.3 lb). The shot put used by women in this class weighs less than the traditional one at 3 kilograms (6.6 lb).

There are performance differences and similarities between this class and other wheelchair classes. A study of javelin throwers in 2003 found that F7 throwers have angular speeds of the shoulder girdle similar to that of F4 to F9 throwers. A 1999 study of discus throwers found that for F5 to F8 discus throwers, the upper arm tends to be near horizontal at the moment of release of the discus. F5 to F7 discus throwers have greater angular speed of the shoulder girdle during release of the discus than the lower number classes of F2 to F4. F5 and F8 discus throwers have less average angular forearm speed than F2 and F4 throwers. F2 and F4 speed is caused by use of the elbow flexion to compensate for the shoulder flexion advantage of F5 to F8 throwers. A study of was done comparing the performance of athletics competitors at the 1984 Summer Paralympics. It found there was little significant difference in performance in distance between women in 2 (SP4), 3 (SP4, SP5), 4 (SP5, SP6), 5 (SP6, SP7) and 6 (SP7) in the discus. It found there was little significant difference in performance in time between men in 3, 4, 5 and 6 in the 200 meters. It found there was little significant difference in performance in time between women in 3, 4 and 5 in the 60 meters. It found there was little significant difference in performance in distance between women in 4, 5 and 6 in the discus. It found there was little significant difference in performance in distance between women in 4, 5 and 6 in the javelin. It found there was little significant difference in performance in distance between women in 4, 5 and 6 in the shot put. It found there was little significant difference in performance in distance between women in 4, 5 and 6 in the discus. It found there was little significant difference in performance in time between women in 4, 5 and 6 in the 60 meters. It found there was little significant difference in performance in time between women in 4, 5 and 6 in the 800 meters. It found there was little significant difference in performance in time between women in 4, 5 and 6 in the 1,500 meters. It found there was little significant difference in performance in time between women in 4, 5 and 6 in the slalom. It found there was little significant difference in performance in distance between men in 4, 5 and 6 in the discus. It found there was little significant difference in performance in distance between men in 4, 5 and 6 in the shot put. It found there was little significant difference in performance in time between men in 4, 5 and 6 in the 100 meters. It found there was little significant difference in performance in time between men in 4, 5 and 6 in the 800 meters. It found there was little significant difference in performance in time between men in 4, 5 and 6 in the 1,500 meters. It found there was little significant difference in performance in time between men in 4, 5 and 6 in the slalom. It found there was little significant difference in performance in distance between women in 5 and 6 in the discus. It found there was little significant difference in performance in time between women in 5 and 6 in the 60 meters. It found there was little significant difference in performance in time between women in 5 and 6 in the 100 meters. It found there was little significant difference in performance in distance between men in 5 and 6 in the javelin. It found there was little significant difference in performance in distance between men in 5 and 6 in the shot put. It found there was little significant difference in performance in time between men in 5 and 6 in the 100 meters.

=== Swimming ===
Generally, people in this class are classified as S5 or S10. F7 swimmers competing as S10 tend to have lesions at S1 or S2 that has minimal effect on their lower limbs. This is often caused by polio or cauda-equina syndrome. Swimmers in this class lack full propulsion in their kicks because of a slight loss of function in one limb. They do a standing start and kick turns, but get less power than they might otherwise because of the leg impairment.

A study of was done comparing the performance of athletics competitors at the 1984 Summer Paralympics. It found there was little significant difference in performance times between women in 4 (SP5, SP6), 5 (SP6, SP7) and 6 (SP7) in the 100m breaststroke. It found there was little significant difference in performance times between women in 4 (SP5, SP6), 5 (SP6, SP7) and 6 (SP7) in the 100m backstroke. It found there was little significant difference in performance times between women in 4 (SP5, SP6), 5 (SP6, SP7) and 6 (SP7) in the 100m freestyle. It found there was little significant difference in performance times between women in 4 (SP5, SP6), 5 (SP6, SP7) and 6 (SP7) in the 14 x 50 m individual medley. It found there was little significant difference in performance times between men in 4 (SP5, SP6), 5 (SP6, SP7) and 6 (SP7) in the 100m backstroke. It found there was little significant difference in performance times between men in 4 (SP5, SP6), 5 (SP6, SP7) and 6 (SP7) in the 100m breaststroke. It found there was little significant difference in performance times between women in 5 (SP6, SP7) and 6 (SP7) in the 50 m butterfly. It found there was little significant difference in performance times between men in 5 (SP6, SP7) and 6 (SP7) in the 4 x 50 m individual medley. It found there was little significant difference in performance times between men in 5 (SP6, SP7) and 6 (SP7) in the 100 m freestyle.

=== Wheelchair basketball ===
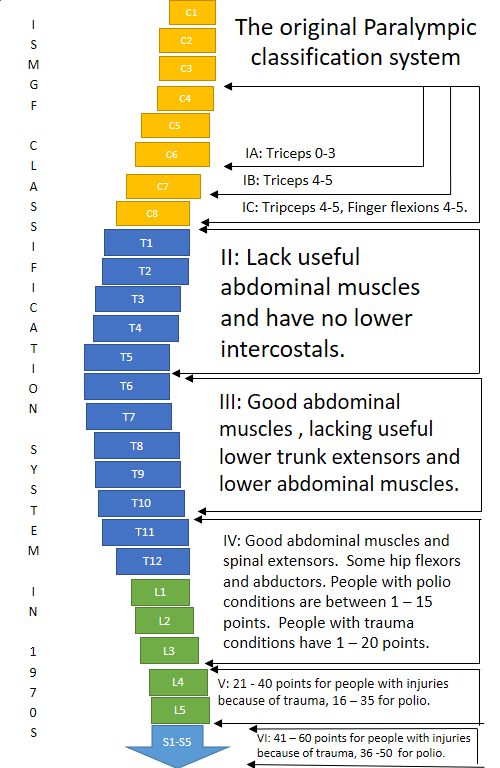
The original ISMGF classification system used at early Paralympic Games.

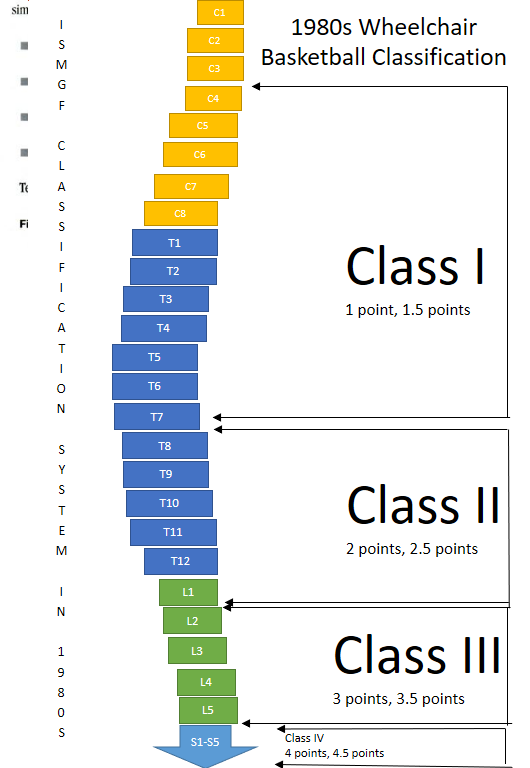
The wheelchair basketball classification system used during the 1980s was mostly functional, but had medical lesion based elements as a guideline. A maximum of 14 points was allowed on the floor at any time.

Wheelchair basketball was one of the earliest sports available to people in this class.

From 1969 to 1973, a classification system designed by Australian Dr. Bedwell was used in wheelchair basketball. This system used some muscle testing to determine which class incomplete paraplegics should be classified in. It used a point system based on the ISMGF classification system. Class IA, IB and IC were worth 1 point. Class II for people with lesions between T1-T5 and no balance were also worth 1 point. Class III for people with lesions at T6-T10 and have fair balance were worth 1 point. Class IV was for people with lesions at T11-L3 and good trunk muscles. They were worth 2 points. Class V was for people with lesions at L4 to L5 with good leg muscles. Class IV was for people with lesions at S1-S4 with good leg muscles. Class V and IV were worth 3 points. The Daniels/Worthington muscle test was used to determine who was in class V and who was class IV. Paraplegics with 61 to 80 points on this scale were not eligible. A team could have a maximum of 11 points on the floor. The system was designed to keep out people with less severe spinal cord injuries, and had no medical basis in many cases. This class would have been V. In 1982, wheelchair basketball finally made the move to a functional classification system internationally. While the traditional medical system of where a spinal cord injury was located could be part of classification, it was only one advisory component. In this system, this class became Class III as 4 or 4.5 point players. Under the current classification system, they would likely be classified as a 4 point player.

=== Other sports ===
One of the sports available to people in this class is adaptive rowing. In this sport, people with incomplete spinal cord injury at S1 compete in LTA. They have use of their legs, arms and trunk. Another sporting option is wheelchair fencing. Wheelchair fencers from this class who are classified as 4. For class 4, fencers tend to have a lesion below L4. They tend to score at least 5 points on Type 3 and Type 4 of the function test. For international IWF sanctioned competitions, classes are combined. 3 and 4 are combined, competing as Category A.

== Getting classified ==
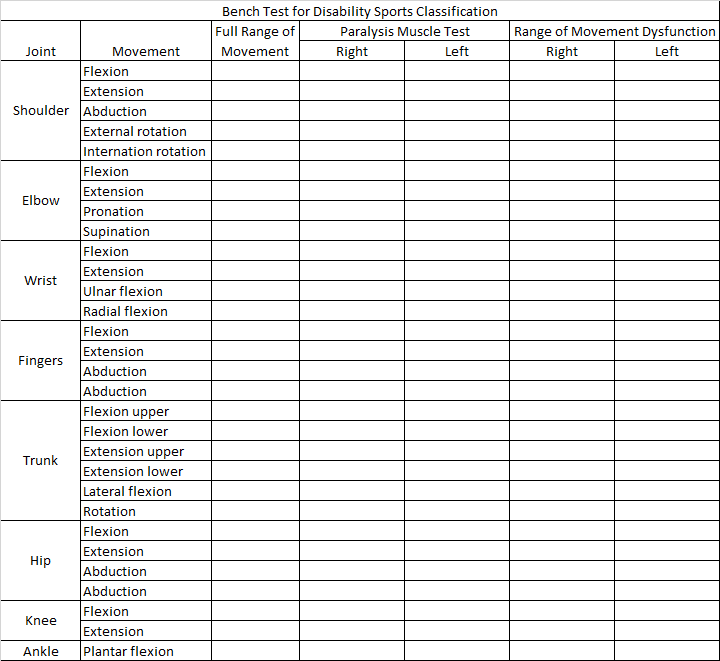
A standard bench press form used to for functional classification for wheelchair sportspeople.

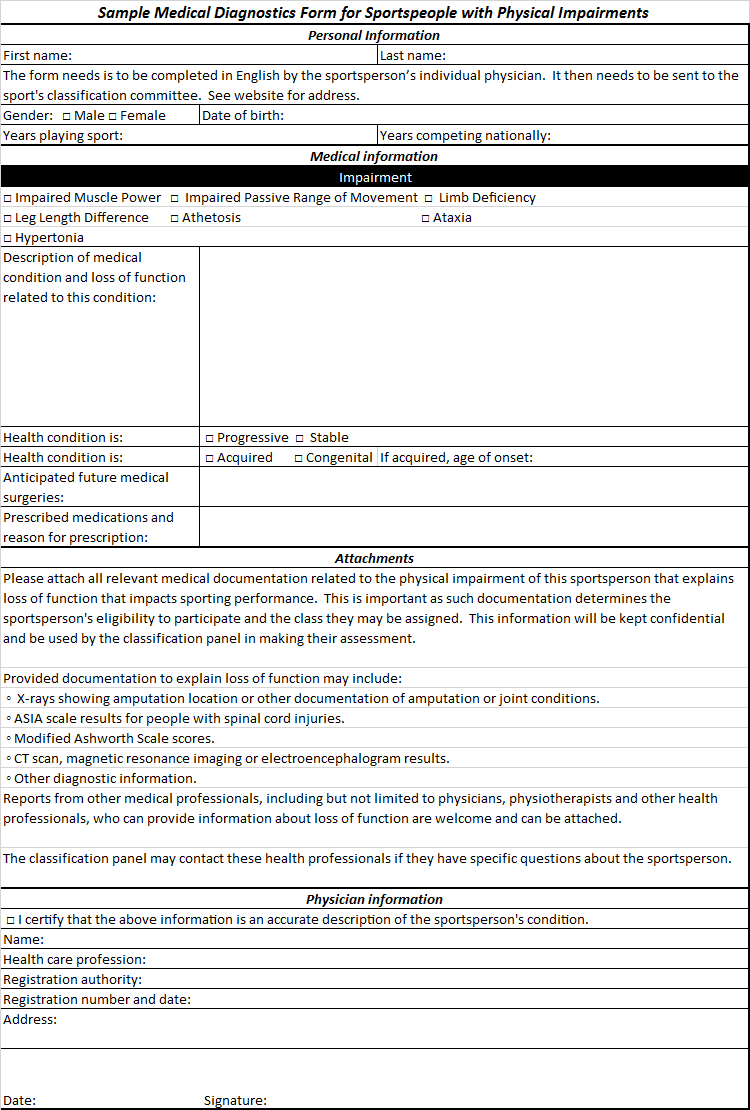
A sample medical classification form. Sportspeople would need some form of this sent to a classification panel.

Classification is often sport specific, and has two parts: a medical classification process and a functional classification process.

Medical classification for wheelchair sport can consist of medical records being sent to medical classifiers at the international sports federation. The sportsperson's physician may be asked to provide extensive medical information including medical diagnosis and any loss of function related to their condition. This includes if the condition is progressive or stable, if it is an acquired or congenital condition. It may include a request for information on any future anticipated medical care. It may also include a request for any medications the person is taking. Documentation that may be required my include x-rays, ASIA scale results, or Modified Ashworth Scale scores.

One of the standard means of assessing functional classification is the bench test, which is used in swimming, lawn bowls and wheelchair fencing. Using the Adapted Research Council (MRC) measurements, muscle strength is tested using the bench press for a variety of spinal cord related injuries with a muscle being assessed on a scale of 0 to 5. A 0 is for no muscle contraction. A 1 is for a flicker or trace of contraction in a muscle. A 2 is for active movement in a muscle with gravity eliminated. A 3 is for movement against gravity. A 4 is for active movement against gravity with some resistance. A 5 is for normal muscle movement.

Wheelchair fencing classification has 6 test for functionality during classification, along with a bench test. Each test gives 0 to 3 points. A 0 is for no function. A 1 is for minimum movement. A 2 is for fair movement but weak execution. A 3 is for normal execution. The first test is an extension of the dorsal musculature. The second test is for lateral balance of the upper limbs. The third test measures trunk extension of the lumbar muscles. The fourth test measures lateral balance while holding a weapon. The fifth test measures the trunk movement in a position between that recorded in tests one and three, and tests two and four. The sixth test measures the trunk extension involving the lumbar and dorsal muscles while leaning forward at a 45 degree angle. In addition, a bench test is required to be performed.
