= F7 =

F7, F.VII, F07, F 7 or F-7 may refer to:

== Aircraft ==
- Ambrosini F.7 Rondone II, an Italian light touring monoplane that first flew in 1954
- Caproni Vizzola F.7, an Italian fighter design of the 1940s
- Chengdu J-7, a Chinese fighter jet, also called "F-7 Skybolt/Airguard", in its export versions
- F-7 Liberator, a U.S. reconnaissance version of the B-24 bomber
- F-7 Sea Dart, American experimental hydro-ski seaplane fighter
- Fokker F.VII, a 1924 Dutch airliner
- F7U Cutlass, a fighter plane used by the US Navy
- Grumman F7F Tigercat, a heavy fighter used by the US Navy
- F-7, a hypothetical light fighter variant of the U.S. Boeing–Saab T-7 Red Hawk jet trainer

== Locomotives ==
- EMD F7, a diesel locomotive
- LNER Class F7, a class of twelve steam locomotives transferred from the GER
- Milwaukee Road class F7, a steam locomotive

== Ships ==
- F 7, a Kriegsmarine F-class escort ship of the late 1930s
- HMAS Yarra (F07), a 1958 Royal Australian Navy River class destroyer escort
- HMS Afridi (F07), a 1937 British Royal Navy Tribal-class destroyer
- HMS Vidette (F07), 1918 British Royal Navy V class destroyer
- Italian submarine F7, an Italian Regia Marina (Royal Navy) submarine in commission from 1917 to 1929

== Automobiles ==
- BMW 5 Series GT (F07) a 2009—2017 5-door fastback produced by BMW.

== Other ==
- F 7 Såtenäs, a Swedish Air Force wing
- F7 (video game character), a Street Fighter character
- IHI Corporation F7, a small Japanese turbofan
- Flybaboo, IATA airline designator
- A standard white point for narrow band daylight fluorescent lamps
- F7, a note of high altitude in the seventh octave and the whistle register
- Factor VII, a coagulation factor
- F7 (classification), a wheelchair sport classification that corresponds to the neurological level S1-S2
- F7, a function key on a computer keyboard
- F-7, Islamabad, a residential sector in Islamabad, Pakistan
- Double Bay ferry service, numbered F7, a ferry route in Sydney, Australia
- F7: an EEG electrode site according to the 10-20 system.
- Furious 7, colloquially known as F7, 2015 film

== See also ==
- 7F (disambiguation)
