= 7F =

7F or 7-F can refer to:

- IATA code for First Air
- Vought YA-7F attack aircraft
- VE-7F, a model of Vought VE-7
- TRANSYT-7F traffic simulation and signal timing optimization program
- S&DJR 7F 2-8-0, or Somerset and Dorset Joint Railway (S&DJR) 7F 2-8-0
- AL-7F, a model of Lyulka AL-7
- AIM-7F, a model of AIM-7 Sparrow
- 7F, the hexadecimal value for DEL in binary to ASCII conversion.
- 7F, the production code for the 1987 Doctor Who serial Delta and the Bannermen

== See also ==
- F7 (disambiguation)
