= ARW1 =

Para-archery classification

ARW1 Classification
- Sport: Paralympic Archery
- Administrator: International Archery Federation

ARW1 is a Paralympic archery classification. It is a sitting class. This class includes Les Autres sportspeople. People from this class compete in the sport at the Paralympic Games.

== History ==
A version of this classification first appeared in 1998 during the World Championships, when the sport's governing body decided to pilot a classification programme. At the time, there was a classification called W1, which was for all sitting archers.

== Sport ==
This is a Paralympic archery classification. In 2000, BBC Sport defined this classification as "W1, spinal cord and cerebral palsy athletes with impairment in all four limbs." In 2008, BBC Sport defined this classification was "ARW1: spinal cord and cerebral palsy athletes with impairment in all four limbs" In 2008, the Australian Broadcasting Corporation defined this classification was "The main difference between ARW1 and ARW2 is the amount of functional ability athletes have in their upper bodies.". In 2012, the Australian Paralympic Education Programme defined this classification as "ARW1 - spinal cord and cerebral palsy athletes with impairment in all four limbs" In 2010, World Archery defined this classification as: a tetraplegic archer in a wheelchair or comparable disability. The Telegraph in 2011 described this classification as: "Athletes shooting from wheelchairs" The British Council defines this classification in 2012 as: "These athletes have a disability that affects their arms and their legs."

This classification has a subclassification: ARW1-C. In 2010, World Archery defined this classification as: "Within ARW1, archers with a greater handicap could be allocated to a sport sub-class ARW1-C and be allowed to compete in facilitated rounds at national or development level competitions. Note: These archers can compete in a higher class internationally."

== Disability groups ==
=== Les Autres ===
One of the disability groups eligible to participate in this class is people defined as Les Autres.

==== LAF1 ====
LAF1 classified athletes compete in ARW1. Sportspeople in this class use wheelchairs on a regular basis as a result of reduced muscle function. ACSM's Primary Care Sports Medicine defines LAF1 as a medical class as "[s]evere involvement of the four limbs -- for example, MS, muscular dystrophy (MD), juvenile rheumatoid arthritis (JRA) with contractures" As a functional class, ACSM's Primary Care Sports Medicine defines LAF1 as "use of wheelchair with reduced function of muscle strength and/or spasticity in throwing arm, and poor sitting balance." Medically, this class includes people with severe multiple sclerosis, muscular dystrophy, and juvenile rheumatoid arthritis with contractures. This means they have severe issues with all four limbs. In terms of functional classification, this means the sportsperson uses a wheelchair, has poor sitting balance and has reduced strength or spasticity in their throwing arm.

==== LAF2 ====
LAF2 classified athletes compete in ARW1 or ARW2. Sportspeople in this class use wheelchairs on a regular basis as a result of reduced muscle function. They have low to moderate levels of balance issues while sitting, but maintain overall good balance from that position. They have normal arm function. Medically, this class includes people with severe hemiplegia, and paralysis of one limb while having deformations in two other limbs. Functionally, this means they have severe impairment of three limbs, or all four limbs but to a lesser degree than LAF1. In terms of functional classification, this means the sportsperson uses a wheelchair, has moderate sitting balance, reduced limb function in their throwing limb but has good sitting balance while throwing.

== Events ==
At the 2008 Summer Paralympics, this classification was known as W1. Events eligible for this classification included W1 Comp Men, W1/2 Women and team. In the W1 Comp Men competition, archers qualified from Canada, the Czech Republic, Finland, France, Great Britain, Italy, Korea, Switzerland and Ukraine. For the W1/2 Women's competition, archers qualified from Canada, China, the Czech Republic, France, Germany, Great Britain, Italy, Japan, Turkey and Ukraine.

The World Archery Para Championships are the major international event for this classification. In 2011, it was held in Turin, Italy and served as a qualification competition for the 2012 Summer Paralympics. Events for this classification included Individual Compound Men W1, in addition to team events using either a compound bow or a recurve bow. For the 2012 Summer Paralympics, the men's individual compound qualifying score for the event set by FITA and the International Paralympic Committee was 1150+ FITA score and 720 Round Score of 575+. For the 2012 Summer Paralympics, the men's individual recurve qualifying score for the event set by FITA and the International Paralympic Committee was 1100+ FITA score and 720 Round Score of 550+. Only one man from the United States was able to qualify for the 2012 Paralympics at the 2012 U.S. Paralympic Team Trials. For the 2012 Summer Paralympics, the women's individual recurve qualifying score for the event set by FITA and the International Paralympic Committee was 1000+ FITA score and 720 Round Score of 450+. At the 2012 Paralympics, this classification will compete in the "Olympic round format at a 122cm target from a distance of 70m".

For the 2016 Summer Paralympics in Rio, the International Paralympic Committee had a zero classification at the Games policy. This policy was put into place in 2014, with the goal of avoiding last minute changes in classes that would negatively impact athlete training preparations. All competitors needed to be internationally classified with their classification status confirmed prior to the Games, with exceptions to this policy being dealt with on a case-by-case basis. In case there was a need for classification or reclassification at the Games despite best efforts otherwise, archery classification was scheduled for September 7 and September 8 at Sambodromo.

== Equipment ==
Their wheelchair can be higher than 110 millimetres (4.3 in) from the bottom of the armpit of an archer. Archers in this class "are allowed to use simultaneous protrusion and strapping. They may use any wheelchair and amount of body support/strapping to maintain body stability as long as no support is given to the bow arm whilst shooting." In this class, archers are allowed to use compound bows in competition. Men are restricted to a maximum draw of 45 pounds (20 kg) and women are restricted to 35 pounds (16 kg). Archers are allowed to have an assistant who can knock their bow for them. The assistant must be wearing the same uniform colour and number as the archer they are working with.

== Becoming classified ==
Classification is handled by FITA – International Archery Federation. FITA has an Ad Hoc Committee dedication to classification, which is led by Chief Classifier Pauline Betteridge. This committee is in charge of determining classifications, providing materials about classifications and training people to classify archers.

World Archery classification is done by at least three people. One of them must have a medical background. On the national level, there only needs to be one classifier. Archery classification is done by medical professionals. In classifying an archer, the classifiers look for the range of movement and strength of the archer's arms, legs and back.
