= ARST =

Para-archery classification

ARST Classification
- Sport: Paralympic Archery
- Administrator: International Archery Federation

ARST is a Paralympic archery classification. It is a standing class. This class includes Les Autres sportspeople. People from this class compete in the sport at the Paralympic Games. Some people in this class can use stools or have an assistant nock their arrows. Classification is handled by FITA – International Archery Federation.

== History ==
A version of this classification first appeared in 1998 during the World Championships, when the sport's governing body decided to pilot a classification programme. At the time, there was a classification called W2, which was for all standing archers with disabilities.

== Sport ==
This is a Paralympic archery classification. In 2000, BBC Sport defined this classification as "Standing, Amputee, Les Autre and Cerebral Palsy standing athletes. Some athletes in the standing group will sit on a high stool for support but will still have their feet touching the ground. " In 2008, BBC Sport defined this classification was "ARST (standing): athletes who have no disabilities in their arms but who have some disability in their legs. This group also includes amputees, les autres and cerebral palsy standing athletes " In 2012, the Australian Paralympic Education Programme defined this classification as "ARST - (standing): athletes who have full movement in their arms but who have some disability in their legs. This group also includes amputees, les autres and cerebral palsy standing athletes " In 2010, World Archery defined this classification as: "standing archers or those shooting from a chair/stool. 6.4.1. Practical Profile: lower limbs are functional for ambulation over longer distances." The Telegraph in 2011 described this classification as: "Athletes who can shoot from a standing position" The British Council defines this classification in 2012 as: "These athletes have a disability that affects their legs, but they are able to stand or sit in an ordinary chair with their feet on the ground."

This classification has a subclassification: ARST-C. In 2010, World Archery defined this classification as: "Within ARST archers with severe disabilities of upper extremities may be allocated to a sport sub-class ARST-C and allowed to compete in facilitated rounds at national or developmental level competitions."

== Disability groups ==
=== Les Autres ===
One of the disability groups eligible to participate in this class is people defined as Les Autres.

==== LAF4 ====
LAF4 classified athletes compete in ARST. People in this class can compete while sitting on a high stool, but their feet must be touching the ground while shooting. LAF5 is a Les Autres sports classification. This is an ambulant class for people who have difficulty moving or severe balance problems. They may use crutches on a daily basis. They have reduced upper limb functionality. Medically, this class includes people with contracture/ankylosis in joints of one limb and limited function in another limb. It means they have limited function in two limbs but to a lesser extent than LAF3. In terms of functional classification, this means the sportsperson is ambulatory with or without crutches and braces, has balance problems and reduced function in their throwing arm.

==== LAF5 ====
LAF5 classified archers compete in ARST. People in this class can compete while sitting on a high stool, but their feet must be touching the ground while shooting. This is an ambulant class for people with normal upper limb functionality but who have balance issues or problems with their lower limbs. Medically, this class includes people with contracture of the hip or knee, paresis of one arm, or kyphoscoliosis. In practice, this means they have limited function in at least one limb. In terms of functional classification, this means the sportsperson is ambulatory with good arm function. They have issues with balance or reduced function in their lower limbs.

==== LAF6 ====
LAF6 classified athletes compete in ARST. People in this class can compete while sitting on a high stool, but their feet must be touching the ground while shooting. It is an ambulant class for people with minimal issues with trunk and lower limb functionality. People in this class have impairments in one upper limb. Medically, this class includes people with arthritis and osteoporosis, or ankylosis of the knee. In practice, this means minimal disability. In terms of functional classification, this means the sportsperson is ambulatory with good upper limb functionality, and minimal trunk or lower limb functionality.

== Events ==
At the 2008 Summer Paralympics, this classification was known as ST. Events eligible for this classification included ST Men, ST Women, and team. In the ST Men event, archers qualified from China, France, Great Britain, Greece, Japan, Korea, Mongolia, the Netherlands, Poland, Russia, Slovakia, SpainThailand and Ukraine. In the ST Women event, archers qualified from China, France, Germany, Great Britain, Greece, Japan, Korea, Mongolia, the Netherlands, Poland, Switzerland, Ukraine and the United States.

The World Archery Para Championships are the major international event for this classification. In 2011, it was held in Turin, Italy and served as a qualification competition for the 2012 Summer Paralympics. Events for this classification included Individual Recurve Men Standing and Individual Recurve Women Standing, in addition to team events using either a compound bow or a recurve bow. At the 2011 BWAA & WheelPower National Championships & 7th Invitational Event held at the Stoke Mandeville Stadium in England, the gold medal in the Recurve Bow Class Standing Men event was won my Murray Elliot of Great Britain, the silver by Francisco Dantas of Brazil, and the bronze by Kenny Allen of Great Britain.

For the 2012 Summer Paralympics, the men's individual recurve qualifying score for the event set by FITA and the International Paralympic Committee was 1100+ FITA score and 720 Round Score of 550+. Only one man from the United States was able to qualify for the 2012 Paralympics at the 2012 U.S. Paralympic Team Trials. For the 2012 Summer Paralympics, the women's individual recurve qualifying score for the event set by FITA and the International Paralympic Committee was 1000+ FITA score and 720 Round Score of 450+. Only one woman from the United States was able to qualify for the 2012 Paralympics at the 2012 U.S. Paralympic Team Trials. At the 2012 Paralympics, this classification will compete in the "Olympic round format at a 122cm target from a distance of 70m".

For the 2016 Summer Paralympics in Rio, the International Paralympic Committee had a zero classification at the Games policy. This policy was put into place in 2014, with the goal of avoiding last minute changes in classes that would negatively impact athlete training preparations. All competitors needed to be internationally classified with their classification status confirmed prior to the Games, with exceptions to this policy being dealt with on a case-by-case basis. In case there was a need for classification or reclassification at the Games despite best efforts otherwise, archery classification was scheduled for September 7 and September 8 at Sambodromo.

== Equipment ==
ARST-C archers are allowed to have an assistant who can nock their bow for them. The assistant must be wearing the same uniform colour and number as the archer they are working with.

== Becoming classified ==
Classification is handled by FITA – International Archery Federation. World Archery classification is done by at least three people. One of them must have a medical background. On the national level, there only needs to be one classifier. Archery classification is done by medical professionals. In classifying an archer, the classifiers look for the range of movement and strength of the archer's arms, legs and back.
