= Les Autres sport classification =

Disability sports classification

Les Autres sport classification is system used in disability sport for people with locomotor disabilities not included in other classification systems for people with physical disabilities. The purpose of this system is to facilitate fair competition between people with different types of disabilities, and to give credibility to disability sports. It was designed and managed by International Sports Organization for the Disabled (ISOD) until the 2005 merger with IWAS, when management switched to that organization. Classification is handled on the national level by relevant sport organizations.

Designed as a catchall classification system for people with locomotor disabilities, people with a variety of different disabilities are included in the classification system. These include different limb length, polio sequela, Gullian's Syndrome, some types of cerebral palsy, some spinal conditions related to polio, osteogenesis imperfecta and junior rheumatoid arthritis. It does not include people with intellectual disabilities or people who are deaf. LAF1, LAF2 and LAF3 are wheelchair classes, while LAF4, LAF5 and LAF6 are ambulant classes. SS1 and SS2 are classes for people with short stature who otherwise do not fit into traditional Les Autres classes. The classification system was created by ISOD in the 1970s, with Les Autres sportspeople first participating at the 1976 Summer Paralympics. Subsequently, the classification system was expanded to include six classes. Changes have been made to these classes since then while retaining the original six classes.

A variety of sports are open to Les Autres sportspeople including archery, boccia, cycling, equestrian, paracanoe, paratriathlon, powerlifting, rowing, sailing, shooting, swimming, table tennis, track and field, wheelchair American football, wheelchair basketball, wheelchair fencing, wheelchair softball and wheelchair tennis. The classification system has been criticized when used to facilitate competition against people with other disability types for not factoring in things like the impact of exertion on performance.

== Purpose ==
The purpose of Les Autres sport classification is to allow for fair competition between people of different disability types. As a system, its purpose in being created was largely to find a way to include people with certain types of disabilities not covered by other disability sport classification types, but who otherwise fit inside the model and culture of who should be a Paralympic sportsperson. It is also about giving credibility to disability sport by having a system that makes it possible for different types of people to compete against each other.

== Governance ==
Les Autres sport classification was originally created and then governed by the International Sports Organization for the Disabled (ISOD). Currently, classification is overseen by IWAS, having taken over this role following the 2005 merger of ISMWSF and ISOD.

National sport organizations handle classification on the national level. In the United Kingdom, this is the British Amputee and Les Autres Sports Association. In the United States, this is the United States Les Autres Sports Association. The classification system used in the United States has generally matched the international norms, though in track in field there have been five wheelchair classes and five ambulatory classes for Les Autres sportspeople. In Australia, Wheelchair Sports Australia was the governing body for classification for Les Autres sportspeople, with Disability Sports Australia taking over the role following the 2003 merger of Australian Sports Organisation for the Disabled (ASOD), Cerebral Palsy Australian Sports and Recreation Federation (CPASRF) and Wheelchair Sports Australia (WSA).

== Disabilities ==
ISOD eligibility for people in the Les Autres group covers sportspeople with locomotor disabilities regardless of their diagnosis. In practice, this class generally covers people with minimal disabilities who do not use a wheelchair, do not have cerebral palsy and do not have an amputation. This special disability group also includes people with Friedreich's ataxia, Duchenne's, Ehlers–Danlos syndrome, arthrogryposis, osteogenesis imperfecta and junior rheumatoid arthritis. It also includes people with different limb length, polio sequela, Gullian's syndrome, some types of cerebral palsy, some spinal conditions related to polio, spondyloepiphyseal dysplasia. The term Les Autres to refer to these disability groups was first used in 1980.

The Les Autres class of disabilities generally covers two classes. These are people with short stature or dwarfism and people with impaired passive range of movement. The latter is sometimes referred to as PROM. PROM includes people with joint disorders including arthrogryposis and thalidomide. Most of the included specific conditions are for congenital disorders. It also includes people with multiple sclerosis.

People who are ineligible to compete in Les Autres classes include people with intellectual disabilities, people with heart, chest, abdominal, ear, eye or skin related disabilities where these disabilities do not impair their locomotor function. This grouping does not include people with dislocated muscles or arthritis.

Les Autres classes are sometimes broken down differently in medical literature, because the category contains ten different types of permanent disabilities. These include hypertonia, ataxia, atheotosis, loss of muscle strength, loss of range of movement, loss of limb, short stature, low vision and intellectual disability. These ten categories through are not used as the basis of specific Les Autres classes.

People in Les Autres classes often have cardiovascular issues associated with the condition causing their disability. They are almost more prone to stress fractures. Individuals with short stature have this issue as a result of congenital issues.

== History ==
The classification system for Les Autres sport was developed by International Sports Organization for the Disabled (ISOD) during the late 1970s after the organization had worked on developing classification systems for other disability groups earlier in the decade. Les Autres sportspeople were included on the Paralympic program for the first time at the 1976 Summer Paralympics in Toronto. In 1977, ISOD formally created the Les Autres sport classification system, with this system including six classes for Les Autres sportspeople being used for the first time at the 1980 Summer Paralympics. Around the time it was created, the system was a viewed as being both a medical based one and a functional one. The functional nature was understood because of the difficulty otherwise often found in classifying people with multiple different disability types at the same time.

Les Autres sportspeople were first eligible to compete at United States Cerebral Palsy Association athletic events in 1978 after previously having been locked out. They were also not included in the United States's National Wheelchair Athletic Association events prior to that. Their participation was only allowed after people started studying their disabilities and how it impacted their sport performance.

The 15 members of the United States Paralympic team at the 1984 Summer Paralympics in Les Autres classes included 4 people with muscular dystrophy, 2 with multiple sclerosis, 2 with Friedreich's ataxia, 1 with Arthrogryposis, 3 with Osteogensis imperfect, and 1 with short stature. At the 1984 Games, Great Britain won the most medals among all Les Autres events. They claimed 55. Spain was second with 38 and the United States was third with 26. Equestrian had a combined class for spinal cord injuries and Les Autres at the 1984 Summer Paralympics, with the competition being held in Texas. There were 16 total competitors, with three having spinal cord injuries, two having multiple sclerosis, two with other neurological impairments, and nine others.

In the United States, Les Autres were participated in sport via cerebral palsy sport organizations, and first participated in a national championship with their own classes in 1985. An organization for sports for dwarfs was created the same year in the United States and a separate one was created for people with Les Autres. At the 1988 Summer Paralympics, there were 6 classes specifically for Les Autres sportspeople. At the 1988 Games, Les Autres sportspeople were not eligible to participate in wheelchair basketball.

Starting in 1992, there was a move away from Les Autres specific classifications to functional based classification systems at the Paralympic Games. This was realized in swimming, where Les Autres sportspeople competed directly against people with other disabilities including cerebral palsy, spinal cord injuries and amputations. As a result, the 1992 Games saw the total number of classes for people with physical disabilities drop from 31 to 10. Following the 1992 Games, numerous changes were made to the swimming classification system using the 10 class system as the basis to make it more competitive.

A 1996 study of American attitudes of different disability groups participating in sport by other disability sportspeople found amputees were viewed most favorably, followed by les autres, paraquadriplegia, and visual impairment. Sportspeople with cerebral palsy were viewed the least favorably. In 2010, the IPC announced that they would release a new IPC Athletics Classification handbook that specifically dealt with physical impairments. This classification guide would be put into effect following the closing ceremony of the 2012 Summer Paralympics. One of these changes was creating a minimum age to compete in the T40 and T41 classes, open to competitors with short stature.

== Classes ==
LAF1, LAF2 and LAF3 are wheelchair classes, while LAF4, LAF5 and LAF6 are ambulant classes.

Class	Definition	Archery	Athletics	Equestrian	Swimming	Other sports	Ref
LAF1	Wheelchair class. Severe issues with all four limbs. Impairment in dominant arm.	ARW1	F51, F52, F53	Grade 1		Skiing: LW10 Powerlifting: Weight based Sitting volleyball: Minimal disability	
LAF2	Wheelchair class. Low to moderate levels of balance issues while sitting. Severe impairment of three limbs, or all four limbs but to a lesser degree than LAF1, Normal arm function.	ARW1, ARW2	F53	Grade 1		Powerlifting: Weight based Sitting volleyball: Minimal disability Skiing: LW11	
LAF3	Wheelchair or wheelchair class. Reduced muscle function. Normal trunk functionality, balance and use of their upper limbs. Weakness in one leg muscle or who have joint restrictions. Limited function in at least two limbs.	ARW2	T44, F54, F55, F56, F57, F58	Grade 1		Powerlifting: Weight based Sitting volleyball: Minimal disability Skiing: LW12	
LAF4	Ambulant class. Difficulty moving or severe balance problems. Reduced upper limb function. Limited function in two limbs to a lesser extent than LAF3.	ARST	T46, F58	Grade 4		CP football: CP5 Powerlifting: Weight based Sitting volleyball: Minimal disability	
LAF5	Ambulant class. Normal upper limb functionality but who have balance issues or problems with their lower limbs. Limited function in at least one limb.	ARST	F42, F43, F44	Grade 4		Powerlifting: Weight based Sitting volleyball: Minimal disability Triathlon: TRI3	
LAF6	Ambulant class. Minimal issues with trunk and lower limb functionality. Impairments in one upper limb. Minimal disability.	ARST	F46	Grade 4		Powerlifting: Weight based Sitting volleyball: Minimal disability Triathlon: TRI4	
SS1	Short stature. Male standing height and arm length added together are equal to or less than 180 centimetres (71 in). Female standing height and arm length added together are equal to or less than 173 centimetres (68 in).		T40, F40		S2, S5, S6	Powerlifting: Weight based Sitting volleyball: Minimal disability	
SS2	Short stature. Male standing height and arm length added together are equal to or less than 200 centimetres (79 in). Female standing height and arm length added together are equal to or less than 190 centimetres (75 in).		T41, F41		S6	Powerlifting: Weight based Sitting volleyball: Minimal disability	

There are a number of sports open to people who fit into Les Autres classes, though their eligibility often depends on if they have short stature or PROM. For people with short stature, these sports include equestrian, powerlifting, swimming, table tennis and track and field. For people with PROM, these sports include archery, boccia, cycling, equestrian, paracanoe, paratriathlon, powerlifting, rowing, sailing, shooting, swimming, table tennis, track and field, wheelchair American football, wheelchair basketball, wheelchair fencing, wheelchair softball and wheelchair tennis. Historically, a number of sports were closed internationally to LA sportspeople including boccia, CP football, wheelchair fencing, wheelchair rugby and wheelchair tennis.

Some sports have open classification, with all Les Autres and short stature classes able to participate so long as they meet the minimal definition of having a disability. This was true for powerlifting. In athletics, the T40s and F40s classes include Les Autres classes. Les Autres competitors can also participate in sitting volleyball. In the past, the sport had a classification system and they were assigned to one of these classes. The rules were later changed to be inclusive of anyone, including Les Autres players, who meet the minimum disability requirement. In Nordic and alpine skiing, Les Autres competitors participate in different classes depending on their type of disability and what is effected. Wheelchair softball uses a point system similar to wheelchair basketball. Wheelchair American football requires at least one of the six football players on the field be a tetraplegic or woman with a disability. In CP soccer, rules requiring a CP5 player on the field led to wider adoption of Les Autres classes into the CP classification system to facilitate comparable participation.

In para-triathlon, LAF5 Les Autres competitors may be put into TRI3. This class is for people with multiple sclerosis, cerebral palsy, muscular dystrophy and other similar disabilities who can use a regular bicycle. LAF5 may be in TRI4 because of minimal upper limb disability.

== Criticism ==
The system of classification for people with Les Autres related disabilities has been criticized for not having a rigid conceptual model for how classes are defined and determining the basis of facilitating fair competition between people in this disability group type. Of the major disabilities covered by the Paralympic sport, the IPC has acknowledged this group as being the weakest in this regard. In some instances, the weakness of this system results in Les Autres sportspeople being classified using the wheelchair sports, amputee sports or cerebral palsy sports classification systems.

Another criticism of this classification is that it marginalizes sportspeople in this class because they do not fit into easy to understand media narratives about elite sportspeople with disabilities because the type of disability they have is either not easy to understand and they are not in sports where they can be celebrated because of technological advantages. For swimming, the integrated classification system has been criticized because of its emphasis on functional ability while not taking into consideration other variables like exertion. These variables tend to disadvantage certain groups against other disability groups like people with amputations. Another criticism of the classification system is that for some sports, like swimming, there is a lack of scientific evidence to backup the classification system. During the 1980s, the inclusion of this group was also criticized because it changed the power dynamics within the broader Paralympic community.
