= World Abilitysport =

International disabled sports governing body

- Formation: 1964
- Type: International sport federation
- Headquarters: Buckinghamshire, United Kingdom
- President: Rudi Van den Abbeele
- CEO: Charmaine Hooper
- Website: https://worldabilitysport.org/
- Formerly called: International Wheelchair and Amputee Sports Federation (IWAS); International Stoke Mandeville Wheelchair Sports Federation

World Abilitysport (formerly the International Wheelchair and Amputee Sports Federation or IWAS) is an international sports organisation that governs sports for athletes with physical impairments.

It is a registered charity with its headquarters located at Aylesbury College in Buckinghamshire. It is the international governing body for the Paralympic sport of wheelchair fencing, as well as power hockey and para dance sport. It also organizes the World Abilitysport Games, an event for paralympic sports held outside of Summer Paralympic years.

== History ==
The International Stoke Mandeville Games were the forerunner of the Paralympic Games and followed the vision of their creator and founder, Ludwig Guttmann.

Logo of the former organization International Stoke Mandeville Wheelchair Sports Federation (ISMWSF)

IWAS was formed in 2005 following a merger of the International Stoke Mandeville Wheelchair Sports Federation (ISMWSF) (which was formerly known as the International Stoke Mandeville Games Federation (ISMGF) and the International Sports Federation of the Disabled (ISOD). ISOD had been founded by the International War Veterans Association in 1964.

In November 2022, during an extraordinary general assembly, the Cerebral Palsy International Sports and Recreation Association (CPISRA) and IWAS approved a merger. In April 2023, the organization rebranded as World Abilitysport. In January 2024, it took over governance of wheelchair dancesport from the International Paralympic Committee.

== Sports ==
World Abilitysport serves as the international governing body for the Paralympic sport of wheelchair fencing. It also serves as the governing body for two non-Paralympic sports, power hockey and para dance sport. It also governs frame football, frame running, and wheelchair slalom as "developing" sports.
