= Algeria at the Paralympics =

- IPC code: ALG
- NPC: Algerian National Paralympic Committee
- Medals Ranked 43rd: Gold 33 Silver 22 Bronze 41 Total 96

Summer appearances
- 1992; 1996; 2000; 2004; 2008; 2012; 2016; 2020; 2024

Algeria made its Paralympic Games début at the 1992 Summer Paralympics in Barcelona, sending two competitors in athletics, and a goalball team. The country has taken part in every edition of the Summer Paralympics since then, but has never participated in the Winter Paralympics.

Algerians have won a total of 38 medals at the Paralympic Games, of which 15 gold, 7 silver and 16 bronze. Mohamed Allek won Algeria's first two gold medals at the 1996 Games, in the men's 100m and 200m sprints, T36 category. He won three more gold medals, also in sprinting, in 2000. In 2004, his only medal was a bronze, while five other Algerian athletes won a total of seven gold medals: Karim Betina in the men's shot put (F32); Sofia Djelal in the women's discus and javelin (F56-58); Nadia Medjemedj in the women's shot put (F56-58); Samir Nouioua in the men's 1,500m and 5,000m in athletics (T46); and Messaoud Nine in judo (men's up to 90 kg). In 2008, Karim Betina again took a gold in the shot put, as did Kamel Kardjena, while Sid Ali Lamri and Messaoud Nine took a gold medal each in judo.

== Medals ==
=== Medals by Summer Games ===
Games	Athletes	Gold	Silver	Bronze	Total	Rank
(Italy) 1960 Rome	Part of France					
(Japan) 1964 Tokyo	Did not participate					
(Israel) 1968 Tel Aviv	Did not participate					
(Germany) Heidelberg 1972	Did not participate					
(Canada) Toronto 1976	Did not participate					
(Netherlands) Arnhem 1980	Did not participate					
(United States) New York 1984	Did not participate					
(South Korea) Seoul 1988	Did not participate					
(Spain) Barcelona 1992	8	0	0	0	0	56
(United States) Atlanta 1996	9	2	2	3	7	40
(Australia) Sydney 2000	8	3	0	0	3	38
(Greece) Athens 2004	18	6	2	5	13	25
(China) Beijing 2008	28	4	3	8	15	31
(United Kingdom) London 2012	33	4	6	9	19	26
(Brazil) Rio de Janeiro 2016	60	4	5	7	16	27
(Japan) Tokyo 2020	57	4	4	4	12	29
(France) Paris 2024	26	6	0	5	11	25
(United States) Los Angeles 2028	Future event					
(Australia) Brisbane 2032	Future event					
Total		33	22	41	96	41

=== Medals by Winter Games ===
Games	Athletes	Gold	Silver	Bronze	Total	Rank
(Sweden) Örnsköldsvik 1976	Did not participate					
(Norway) Geilo 1980	Did not participate					
(Austria) Innsbruck 1984	Did not participate					
(Austria) Innsbruck 1988	Did not participate					
(France) Albertville 1992	Did not participate					
(Norway) Lillehammer 1994	Did not participate					
(Japan) Nagano 1998	Did not participate					
(United States) Salt Lake City 2002	Did not participate					
(Italy) Turin 2006	Did not participate					
(Canada) Vancouver 2010	Did not participate					
(Russia) Sochi 2014	Did not participate					
(South Korea) Pyeongchang 2018	Did not participate					
(China) Beijing 2022	Did not participate					
(Italy) Milan & Cortina 2026	Future event					
Total		0	0	0	0	−

=== Medals by Summer Sport ===
Sport	Gold	Silver	Bronze	Total
Athletics	27	22	33	82
Judo	5	0	6	11
Paracanoeing	1	0	0	1
Powerlifting	0	0	2	2
Totals (4 entries)	33	22	41	96

=== Medals by Winter Sport ===
Games	Gold	Silver	Bronze	Total
Total	0	0	0	0

== Detail ==
Games	Athletes	Sports	Athletes by sport						Medals			Total	Rank
Games	Athletes	Sports	Athletics	Goalball	Judo	Powerlifting	Wheelchair basketball	Paracanoeing	Gold medal	Silver medal	Bronze medal	Total	Rank
(Spain) 1992 Barcelona	8	2	2	6	-	-	-	-	0	0	0	0	56
(United States) 1996 Atlanta	9	2	7	-	2	-	-	-	2	2	3	7	40
(Australia) 2000 Sydney	8	2	6	-	-	2	-	-	3	0	0	3	38
(Greece) 2004 Athens	18	3	14	-	2	2	-	-	6	2	5	13	25
(China) 2008 Beijing	28	2	23	-	5	-	-	-	4	3	8	15	31
(United Kingdom) 2012 London	33	4	24*	6*	3	1	-	-	4	6	9	19	26
(Brazil) 2016 Rio de Janeiro	60	6	19	12	3	2	24	-	4	5	7	16	27
(Japan) 2020 Tokyo	57	5	21	6	3	3	24	-	4	4	4	12	29
(France) 2024 Paris	26	4	20	-	2	3	-	1	6	0	5	11	25
Total									33	22	41	96	41

* There is one man competitor who participate in Athletics and Goalball, so number of men competitors is 26 not 27.

== Athletes with most medals ==
The Algerian athlete who won the most medals in the history of the Paralympic Games, is the Paralympian athlete Samir Nouioua.

Athlete	Sport	Games	Gold medal	Silver medal	Bronze medal	Total
Samir Nouioua	Athletics	2004–2008–2012–2016–2020	3	3	2	8
Mohamed Allek	Athletics	1996–2000–2004–2008	5	0	1	6
Nassima Saifi	Athletics	2008–2012–2016–2020–2024	3	2	1	6
Kamel Kardjena	Athletics	2008–2012–2016–2020–2024	2	2	1	5
Nadia Medjemedj	Athletics	2004–2008–2012–2016–2020–2024	1	0	4	5
Skander Djamil Athmani	Athletics	2020–2024	3	1	0	4
Safia Djelal	Athletics	2004–2008–2012–2016–2020–2024	3	1	0	4
Karim Betina	Athletics	2004–2008–2012–2016	2	1	1	4
Lynda Hamri	Athletics	2012–2016–2020–2024	0	1	3	4
Mohamed Berrahal	Athletics	2012–2016–2020–2024	1	1	1	3
Mounia Gasmi	Athletics	2012–2016–2020–2024	0	2	1	3
Lahouari Bahlaz	Athletics	2012–2016–2020–2024	0	1	2	3
Sofiane Hamdi	Athletics	2008–2012–2016–2024	0	1	2	3
Faouzi Bellele	Athletics	1996	0	1	2	3
Abdellatif Baka	Athletics	2012–2016–2020–2024	2	0	0	2
Mouloud Noura	Judo	2008–2012–2016	1	0	1	2
Hocine Gherzouli	Athletics	2008–2012	0	1	1	2
Zoubida Bouazoug	Judo	2008–2012	0	0	2	2
Hocine Bettir	Powerlifting	2020–2024	0	0	2	2

Notes: in Khaki the athletes still in activity.

== List of medalists ==
Medal	Name	Games	Sport	Event	Date
Gold	Mohamed Allek	(United States) 1996 Atlanta	Athletics	100 m T36	August 1996
Gold	Mohamed Allek	(United States) 1996 Atlanta	Athletics	200 m T36	August 1996
Silver	Faouzi Bellele	(United States) 1996 Atlanta	Athletics	Men's 5000m T34-37	August 1996
Silver	Youcef Boudjeltia	(United States) 1996 Atlanta	Athletics	Men's 400m T12	August 1996
Bronze	Faouzi Bellele	(United States) 1996 Atlanta	Athletics	Men's 800m T34-36	August 1996
Bronze	Faouzi Bellele	(United States) 1996 Atlanta	Athletics	Men's 1500m T34-37	August 1996
Bronze	Bachir Zergoune	(United States) 1996 Atlanta	Athletics	Men's 800m T44-46	August 1996
Gold	Mohamed Allek	(Australia) 2000 Sydney	Athletics	Men's 100 m T37	October 2000
Gold	Mohamed Allek	(Australia) 2000 Sydney	Athletics	Men's 200 m T37	October 2000
Gold	Mohamed Allek	(Australia) 2000 Sydney	Athletics	Men's 400 m T37	October 2000
Gold	Karim Betina	(Greece) 2004 Athens	Athletics	Men's Shot put F32	19 September 2004
Gold	Nadia Medjemedj	(Greece) 2004 Athens	Athletics	Women's Shot put F56-58	20 September 2004
Gold	Samir Nouioua	(Greece) 2004 Athens	Athletics	Men's 1500m T46	20 September 2004
Gold	Messaoud Nine	(Greece) 2004 Athens	Judo	Men's Middleweight 90kg	20 September 2004
Bronze	Khaled Hanani	(Greece) 2004 Athens	Athletics	Men's 1500m T37	20 September 2004
Bronze	Mohamed Aissaoui	(Greece) 2004 Athens	Athletics	Men's 1500m T46	20 September 2004
Bronze	Mohamed Allek	(Greece) 2004 Athens	Athletics	Men's 200m T37	21 September 2004
Bronze	Karim Betina	(Greece) 2004 Athens	Athletics	Men's Club throw F32/51	21 September 2004
Bronze	Omar Benchiheb	(Greece) 2004 Athens	Athletics	Men's 1500m T11	22 September 2004
Silver	Samir Nouioua	(Greece) 2004 Athens	Athletics	Men's 800m T46	25 September 2004
Silver	Hakim Yahiaoui	(Greece) 2004 Athens	Athletics	Men's Discus throw F13	25 September 2004
Gold	Samir Nouioua	(Greece) 2004 Athens	Athletics	Men's 5000m T46	27 September 2004
Gold	Sofia Djelal	(Greece) 2004 Athens	Athletics	Women's Javelin throw F56-58	27 September 2004
Gold	Mouloud Noura	(China) 2008 Beijing	Judo	Men -60 kg	7 September 2008
Gold	Sid Ali Lamri	(China) 2008 Beijing	Judo	Men -66 kg	7 September 2008
Bronze	Mounir Bakiri	(China) 2008 Beijing	Athletics	Men's Shot Put F32	8 September 2008
Gold	Karim Betina	(China) 2008 Beijing	Athletics	Men's Shot Put - F32	8 September 2008
Bronze	Zoubida Bouazoug	(China) 2008 Beijing	Judo	Women's +70 kg	9 September 2008
Bronze	Nadia Medjemedj	(China) 2008 Beijing	Athletics	Women's Shot Put F57/58	9 September 2008
Bronze	Samir Nouioua	(China) 2008 Beijing	Athletics	Men's 1500m T46	10 September 2008
Gold	Kamel Kardjena	(China) 2008 Beijing	Athletics	Men's Shot Put - F33/34/52	12 September 2008
Bronze	Sofiane Hamdi	(China) 2008 Beijing	Athletics	Men's 100m T37	12 September 2008
Silver	Louadjeda Benoumessad	(China) 2008 Beijing	Athletics	Women's Javelin Throw F33/34/52/53	13 September 2008
Silver	Samir Nouioua	(China) 2008 Beijing	Athletics	Men's 800m T46	15 September 2008
Bronze	Zine Eddine Sekhri	(China) 2008 Beijing	Athletics	Men's 800m T13	15 September 2008
Bronze	Hocine Gherzouli	(China) 2008 Beijing	Athletics	Men's Shot Put F40	15 September 2008
Silver	Sofiane Hamdi	(China) 2008 Beijing	Athletics	Men's 200m T37	16 September 2008
Bronze	Nadia Medjemedj	(China) 2008 Beijing	Athletics	Women's discus throw F57–58	16 September 2008
Bronze	Mouloud Noura	(United Kingdom) 2012 London	Judo	Men's 60 kg	30 August 2012
Bronze	Sid Ali Lamri	(United Kingdom) 2012 London	Judo	Men's 66 kg	30 August 2012
Bronze	Mohamed Berrahal	(United Kingdom) 2012 London	Athletics	Men's 100 m T51	31 August 2012
Bronze	Zoubida Bouazoug	(United Kingdom) 2012 London	Judo	Women's +70 kg	1 September 2012
Silver	Safia Djelal	(United Kingdom) 2012 London	Athletics	Women's javelin throw F58	1 September 2012
Silver	Mounia Gasmi	(United Kingdom) 2012 London	Athletics	Women's club throw F31/32/51	1 September 2012
Bronze	Kamel Kardjena	(United Kingdom) 2012 London	Athletics	Men's discus throw F32-34	1 September 2012
Bronze	Lahouari Bahlaz	(United Kingdom) 2012 London	Athletics	Men's club throw F31/32/51	3 September 2012
Gold	Kamel Kardjena	(United Kingdom) 2012 London	Athletics	Men's shot put F32-33	4 September 2012
Silver	Karim Betina	(United Kingdom) 2012 London	Athletics	Men's shot put F32-33	4 September 2012
Bronze	Mounir Bakiri	(United Kingdom) 2012 London	Athletics	Men's shot put F32-33	4 September 2012
Gold	Nassima Saifi	(United Kingdom) 2012 London	Athletics	Women's discus throw F57–58	4 September 2012
Bronze	Samir Nouioua	(United Kingdom) 2012 London	Athletics	Men's 1500 m T46	4 September 2012
Gold	Mohamed Berrahal	(United Kingdom) 2012 London	Athletics	Men's discus throw F51–53	6 September 2012
Silver	Hocine Gherzouli	(United Kingdom) 2012 London	Athletics	Men's discus throw F40	6 September 2012
Silver	Lynda Hamri	(United Kingdom) 2012 London	Athletics	Women's long jump F13	7 September 2012
Bronze	Lahouari Bahlaz	(United Kingdom) 2012 London	Athletics	Men's discus throw F32-34	7 September 2012
Gold	Abdellatif Baka	(United Kingdom) 2012 London	Athletics	Men's 800 m T13	8 September 2012
Silver	Samir Nouioua	(United Kingdom) 2012 London	Athletics	Men's 800 m T46	8 September 2012
Silver	Lahouari Bahlaz	(Brazil) 2016 Rio de Janeiro	Athletics	Men's shot put F32	8 September 2016
Bronze	Cherine Abdellaoui	(Brazil) 2016 Rio de Janeiro	Judo	Women's 52 kg	8 September 2016
Silver	Nassima Saifi	(Brazil) 2016 Rio de Janeiro	Athletics	Women's shot put F56/57	8 September 2016
Bronze	Nadia Medjemedj	(Brazil) 2016 Rio de Janeiro	Athletics	Women's shot put F56/57	8 September 2016
Silver	Mounia Gasmi	(Brazil) 2016 Rio de Janeiro	Athletics	Women's club throw F31/32	9 September 2016
Silver	Kamel Kardjena	(Brazil) 2016 Rio de Janeiro	Athletics	Men's shot put F33	10 September 2016
Bronze	Nadia Medjemedj	(Brazil) 2016 Rio de Janeiro	Athletics	Women's javelin throw F56	10 September 2016
Bronze	Madjid Djemai	(Brazil) 2016 Rio de Janeiro	Athletics	1500 metres T37	11 September 2016
Gold	Abdellatif Baka	(Brazil) 2016 Rio de Janeiro	Athletics	1500 metres T13	11 September 2016
Silver	Mohamed Berrahal	(Brazil) 2016 Rio de Janeiro	Athletics	Men's 100 metres T51	13 September 2016
Bronze	Lynda Hamri	(Brazil) 2016 Rio de Janeiro	Athletics	Women's long jump T12	13 September 2016
Bronze	Mohamed Fouad Hamoumou	(Brazil) 2016 Rio de Janeiro	Athletics	Men's 400 metres T13	15 September 2016
Gold	Nassima Saifi	(Brazil) 2016 Rio de Janeiro	Athletics	discus throw F56/57	15 September 2016
Bronze	Sofiane Hamdi	(Brazil) 2016 Rio de Janeiro	Athletics	Men's 400 metres T37	16 September 2016
Gold	Samir Nouioua	(Brazil) 2016 Rio de Janeiro	Athletics	Men's 1500 metres T46	16 September 2016
Gold	Asmahan Boudjadar	(Brazil) 2016 Rio de Janeiro	Athletics	Women's shot put F33	16 September 2016
Gold	Cherine Abdellaoui	(Japan) 2020 Tokyo	Judo	Women's 52 kg	27 August 2021
Bronze	Hocine Bettir	(Japan) 2020 Tokyo	Powerlifting	Men's 65 kg	27 August 2021
Bronze	Mounia Gasmi	(Japan) 2020 Tokyo	Athletics	Women's club throw	27 August 2021
Silver	Nassima Saifi	(Japan) 2020 Tokyo	Athletics	Women's discus throw F57	28 August 2021
Bronze	Walid Ferhah	(Japan) 2020 Tokyo	Athletics	Men's club throw F32	28 August 2021
Silver	Skander Djamil Athmani	(Japan) 2020 Tokyo	Athletics	Men's 100 metres T13	29 August 2021
Bronze	Lynda Hamri	(Japan) 2020 Tokyo	Athletics	Women's long jump T12	29 August 2021
Gold	Skander Djamil Athmani	(Japan) 2020 Tokyo	Athletics	Men's 400 metres T13	2 September 2021
Gold	Safia Djelal	(Japan) 2020 Tokyo	Athletics	Women's shot put F57	2 September 2021
Gold	Asmahan Boudjadar	(Japan) 2020 Tokyo	Athletics	Women's shot put F33	2 September 2021
Silver	Abdelkrim Krai	(Japan) 2020 Tokyo	Athletics	Men's 1500 metres T38	4 September 2021
Silver	Kamel Kardjena	(Japan) 2020 Tokyo	Athletics	Men's shot put F33	4 September 2021
Gold	Nassima Saifi	(France) 2024 Paris	Athletics	Women's discus throw F57	31 August 2024
Bronze	Ahmed Mehideb	(France) 2024 Paris	Athletics	Men's club throw F32	31 August 2024
Gold	Skander Djamil Athmani	(France) 2024 Paris	Athletics	Men's 100 metres T13	1 September 2024
Bronze	Lynda Hamri	(France) 2024 Paris	Athletics	Women's long jump T12	1 September 2024
Gold	Skander Djamil Athmani	(France) 2024 Paris	Athletics	Men's 400 m T13	5 September 2024
Gold	Safia Djelal	(France) 2024 Paris	Athletics	Women's shot put F57	5 September 2024
Bronze	Nassima Saifi	(France) 2024 Paris	Athletics	Women's shot put F57	5 September 2024
Gold	Abdelkader Bouamer	(France) 2024 Paris	Judo	Men's 60 kg J1	5 September 2024
Bronze	Ishak Ouldkouider	(France) 2024 Paris	Judo	Men's 60 kg J2	5 September 2024
Bronze	Hocine Bettir	(France) 2024 Paris	Powerlifting	Men's 65 kg	5 September 2024
Gold	Brahim Guendouz	(France) 2024 Paris	Paracanoeing	Men's KL3	7 September 2024

== World and Paralympic records set at the Summer Paralympics ==
=== Athletics ===
Event	Class	Date	Round	Athlete(s)	Time or distance	Record	Ref
Men's 100 metres	T36	September 1996	Final	Mohamed Allek	12.03	WR, PR	
Men's 200 metres	T36	September 1996	Heats	Mohamed Allek	24.61	WR, PR	
Men's 200 metres	T36	September 1996	Final	Mohamed Allek	24.32	WR, PR	
Men's 100 metres	T37	September 2000	Final	Mohamed Allek	11.99	PR	
Men's 400 metres	T37	September 2000	Final	Mohamed Allek	54.66	WR, PR	
Men's shot put	F32	19 September 2004	Final	Karim Betina	7.64	WR, PR	
Women's shot put	F56-58	20 September 2004	Final	Nadia Medjmedj (F57)	9.79	WR, PR	
Women's javelin throw	F56-58	27 September 2004	Final	Safia Djelal (F58)	30.97	WR, PR	
Men's shot put	F32	8 September 2008	Final	Karim Betina	10.65	WR, PR	
Women's shot put	F57–58	9 September 2008	Final	Nadia Medjemedj (F57)	10.93	WR, PR	
Men's shot put	F33–34/52	12 September 2008	Final	Kamel Kardjena (F33)	11.54	WR, PR	
Women's javelin throw	F33–34/52–53	13 September 2008	Final	Louadjeda Benoumessad (F34)	17.28	WR, PR	
Women's discus throw	F57–58	16 September 2008	Final	Nadia Medjemedj (F57)	28.74	PR	
Men's club throw	F31/32/51	31 August 2012	Final	Lahouari Bahlaz (F32)	36.31	PR	
Men's javelin throw	F33-F34	1 September 2012	Final	Kamel Kardjena (F33)	26.40	WR, PR	
Women's discus throw	F57/58	4 September 2012	Final	Nassima Saifi (F58)	40.34	PR	
Men's shot put	F32-33	5 September 2012	Final	Kamel Kardjena (F33)	12.14	PR	
Men's discus throw	F51-52-53	6 September 2012	Final	Mohamed Berrahal (F51)	12.37	WR, PR	
Men's discus throw	F32-33-34	7 September 2012	Final	Lahouari Bahlaz (F32)	22.30	WR, PR	
Men's 800 metres	T13	8 September 2012	Final	Abdellatif Baka	1:53.01	PR	
Women's shot put	F56	8 September 2016	Final	Nadia Medjmedj	9.92 m	WR, PR	
Men's 1500 metres	T12–13	13 September 2016	Final	Abdellatif Baka (T13)	3:48.29	WR, PR	
Men's 400 metres T13	T13	2 September 2021	Final	Skander Djamil Athmani (T13)	46.70	WR, PR	
Women's shot put F57	F57	2 September 2021	Final	Safia Djelal (F57)	11.29	WR, PR	
Women's shot put F33	F33	2 September 2021	Final	Asmahane Boudjadar (T13)	7.10	PR	
Women's discus throw F57	F57	31 August 2024	Final	Nassima Saifi (F57)	35.55	PR	
Men's 100 metres T13	T13	1 September 2024	Final	Skander Djamil Athmani (T13)	10.42	PR	

== See also ==
- Category:Paralympic competitors for Algeria
- Algeria at the Olympics
- Algeria at the African Games
- Algeria at the Mediterranean Games
- Algeria at the Arab Games
