= Algeria at the 2004 Summer Paralympics =

- IPC code: ALG
- NPC: Algerian National Paralympic Committee

in Athens
- Competitors: 18 in 3 sports
- Medals Ranked 25th: Gold 6 Silver 2 Bronze 5 Total 13

Summer Paralympics appearances (overview)
- 1992; 1996; 2000; 2004; 2008; 2012; 2016; 2020; 2024

Algeria competed at the 2004 Summer Paralympics in Athens, Greece. The team included eighteen athletes, fourteen men and four women. Algeria won thirteen medals, six gold, two silver and five bronze.

== Team ==
Algeria had an 18-member large delegation in Athens, including 14 men and 4 women. Three members of the delegation, including two athletes, participated in a study about dental health during the Games.

Sport	Men	Women	Total
Athletics	12	2	14
Judo	2	-	2
Powerlifting	-	2	2
Total	14	4	18

== Medallists ==
Algeria won thirteen medals, six gold, two silver and five bronze.

Medal	Name	Sport	Event	Date
Gold	Karim Betina	Athletics	Men's Shot put F32	19 September
Gold	Nadia Medjemedj	Athletics	Women's Shot put F56-58	20 September
Gold	Samir Nouioua	Athletics	Men's 1500m T46	20 September
Gold	Messaoud Nine	Judo	Men's Middleweight 90kg	20 September
Bronze	Khaled Hanani	Athletics	Men's 1500m T37	20 September
Bronze	Mohamed Aissaoui	Athletics	Men's 1500m T46	20 September
Bronze	Mohamed Allek	Athletics	Men's 200m T37	21 September
Bronze	Karim Betina	Athletics	Men's Club throw F32/51	21 September
Bronze	Omar Benchiheb	Athletics	Men's 1500m T11	22 September
Silver	Samir Nouioua	Athletics	Men's 800m T46	25 September
Silver	Hakim Yahiaoui	Athletics	Men's Discus throw F13	25 September
Gold	Samir Nouioua	Athletics	Men's 5000m T46	27 September
Gold	Sofia Djelal	Athletics	Women's Javelin throw F56-58	27 September

Medals by sport
Sport	Gold medal	Silver medal	Bronze medal	Total
Athletics	5	2	5	12
Judo	1	0	0	1
Total	6	2	5	13

Medals by day
Day	Date	1st place, gold medalist(s)	2nd place, silver medalist(s)	3rd place, bronze medalist(s)	Total
3	19 September	1	0	0	1
4	20 September	3	0	2	5
5	21 September	0	0	2	2
6	22 September	0	0	1	1
9	25 September	0	2	0	2
11	27 September	2	0	0	2
Total		6	2	5	13

Multiple medalists
Name	Sport	1st place, gold medalist(s)	2nd place, silver medalist(s)	3rd place, bronze medalist(s)	Total
Samir Nouioua	Athletics	2	1	0	3
Karim Betina	Athletics	1	0	1	2

== Results by event ==
=== Athletics ===
Men–track

Athlete	Event	Heat		Semifinal		Final	
Athlete	Event	Result	Rank	Result	Rank	Result	Rank
Mohamed Aissaoui	800 m T46	1:59.24	4Q	—N/a		1:59.95	7
Mohamed Aissaoui	1500 m T46	—N/a				4:02.06	3rd place, bronze medalist(s)
Mohamed Aissaoui	5000 m T46	—N/a				15:33.73	7
Mohamed Allek	200 m T37	25.11	2Q	—N/a		25.10	3rd place, bronze medalist(s)
Omar Benchiheb	1500 m T11	—N/a				4:14.62	3rd place, bronze medalist(s)
Omar Benchiheb	5000 m T11	—N/a				16:19.17	4
Hichem Fellahi	100 m T11	11.80	4Q	11.81	6Q	11.85	6
Hichem Fellahi	200 m T11	24.84	11Q	24.08	8Q	DNS	
Khaled Hanani	1500 m T37	—N/a				4:26.05	3rd place, bronze medalist(s)
Redouane Merah	100 m T12	DNF					
Redouane Merah	200 m T12	DNS					
Redouane Merah	400 m T12	1:02.71	13	did not advance			
Samir Nouioua	800 m T46	1:58.54	2Q	—N/a		1:58.71	2nd place, silver medalist(s)
Samir Nouioua	1500 m T46	—N/a				3:58.75	1st place, gold medalist(s)
Samir Nouioua	5000 m T46	—N/a				14:54.49	1st place, gold medalist(s)
Rezki Reguig	800 m T37	2:14.64	3Q	—N/a		2:13.87	6
Rezki Reguig	1500 m T37	—N/a				4:48.03	8
Farid Sehili	800 m T46	2:03.89	6Q	—N/a		1:59.66	5
Farid Sehili	1500 m T46	—N/a				4:04.45	4
Farid Sehili	5000 m T46	—N/a				17:06.40	17
Mustapha Thabet	800 m T37	2:16.12	7Q	—N/a		2:13.87	6

Men–field

Athlete	Event	Final	
Athlete	Event	Result	Rank
Karim Betina	Club throw F32/51	29.17	3rd place, bronze medalist(s)
Karim Betina	Discus F32/51	DNS	
Karim Betina	Shot put F32	7.64 WR	1st place, gold medalist(s)
Hakim Yahiaoui	Discus F13	44.81	2nd place, silver medalist(s)
Hakim Yahiaoui	Shot put F13	12.60	9

Women–field

Athlete	Event	Final	
Athlete	Event	Result	Rank
Sofia Djelal	Discus F56-58	28.21	13
Sofia Djelal	Shot put F56-58	9.17	7
Sofia Djelal	Javelin F56-58	30.97 WR	1st place, gold medalist(s)
Nadia Medjmedj	Discus F56-58	24.54	5
Nadia Medjmedj	Shot put F56-58	9.79 WR	1st place, gold medalist(s)

=== Judo ===
Men

Athlete	Event	Round of 16	Quarterfinals	Semifinals	First repechage round	Repechage semifinals	Final	
Athlete	Event	Opposition Result	Opposition Result	Opposition Result	Opposition Result	Opposition Result	Opposition Result	Rank
Sid Ali Lamri	+66 kg	Kallunki (FIN); L 1000-0000	did not advance					
Messaoud Nine	+90 kg	Stoskus (LTU); W 0211S-0011S	Jones (USA); W 1000-0000	Cugnon (FRA); W	Bye		Kretsul (RUS); W 0120S-0001	1st place, gold medalist(s)

=== Powerlifting ===
Women

Athlete	Event	Total lifted	Rank
Saleha Annab	+48 kg	67.5	8
Nacera Belarbi	+67,5 kg	NMR	

== See also ==
- Algeria at the Paralympics
- Algeria at the 2004 Summer Olympics
