= Algeria at the 2000 Summer Paralympics =

- IPC code: ALG
- NPC: Algerian National Paralympic Committee

in Sydney
- Competitors: 8 in 2 sports
- Medals Ranked 38th: Gold 3 Silver 0 Bronze 0 Total 3

Summer Paralympics appearances (overview)
- 1992; 1996; 2000; 2004; 2008; 2012; 2016; 2020; 2024

Algeria competed at the 2000 Summer Paralympics in Sydney, Australia. It was the country's third participation in the Summer Paralympic Games. Its delegation consisted in six track and field athletes and two competitors in powerlifting. Sprinter Mohamed Allek, who has cerebral palsy (disability category T37), won all of Algeria's medals at these Games - three gold.

== Competitors ==
Algeria had an 8-member large delegation in Sydney, including 7 on foot and 1 on wheelchair. These were the first Games where Algeria had a female Paralympian.

Sport	On Foot	On Wheelchair	Total
Athletics	6	-	6
Powerlifting	1	1	2
Total	7	1	8

== Medallists ==
Sprinter Mohamed Allek, who has cerebral palsy (disability category T37), won all of Algeria's medals at these Games - three gold.

Medal	Name	Sport	Event	Time in the final
Gold	Mohamed Allek	Athletics	Men's 100m (T37)	11.99 (PR)
Gold	Mohamed Allek	Athletics	Men's 200m (T37)	24.39
Gold	Mohamed Allek	Athletics	Men's 400m (T37)	54.66 (WR)

== Results by event ==
=== Athletics ===
Algeria fielded eight athletes in track and field events, all of them men. Mohamed Aissaoui competed in the 800m, 1,500m and 5,000m races in category T46, narrowly missing out on a medal in the 1,500 metres, where he finished fourth in 4:06.85 (2.09 seconds behind China's Wu Yanjian, who took bronze). Bachir Zergoune, also in category T46, who had won a bronze in the 800m in 1996, ran the 800m, 1,500m and 5,000m races, but finished last or second to last in each. Mohamed Allek, who had won two gold medals in 1996 (100m and 200m T36), competed in three races in the T37 disability category (cerebral palsy): 100m, 200m and 400m. He won gold in all three, setting a new Paralympic record (11.99s) in the 100m, and a new world record (54.66s) in the 400m. Rezki Reguig, also a T37 athlete, ran in the 800m, 1,500m and 5,000m races, his best result being a sixth place in the 1,500m. Omar Benchiheb, a visually impaired runner, took part in the 1,500m, 5,000m and 10,000m events in category T11, with mixed results. Although he failed to finish the 5,000 metre race, he advanced to the final in the 1,500m, where he finished fifth in 4:27.33. In the 10,000 metre race, he finished fourth, in 36:55.90, less than fifty-three seconds behind Tim Willis of the United States, who took bronze.

Visually impaired Hakim Yahiaoui competed in the discus and shot put in category F13, finishing sixth in the former and fifth in the latter.

Men–track

Athlete	Event	Heat		Semifinal		Final	
Athlete	Event	Result	Rank	Result	Rank	Result	Rank
Mohamed Aissaoui	800 m T46	—				2:00.79	6
Mohamed Aissaoui	1500 m T46	—				4:06.85	4
Mohamed Aissaoui	5000 m T46	—				16:17.71	8
Mohamed Allek	100 m T37	—		12.21	1Q	11.99 PR	1st place, gold medalist(s)
Mohamed Allek	200 m T37	—		24.84	1Q	24.39	1st place, gold medalist(s)
Mohamed Allek	400 m T37	—		57.11	2Q	54.66 WR	1st place, gold medalist(s)
Omar Benchiheb	1500 m T11	—		4:28.49	6Q	4:27.33	5
Omar Benchiheb	5000 m T11	—				DNF	
Omar Benchiheb	10000 m T11	—				36:55.90	4
Rezki Reguig	800 m T38	—		2:15.19	9	did not advance	
Rezki Reguig	1500 m T37	—				4:43.21	6
Rezki Reguig	5000 m T38	—				DNF	
Bachir Zergoune	800 m T46	—				2:06.06	8
Bachir Zergoune	1500 m T46	—				4:24.61	8
Bachir Zergoune	5000 m T46	—				17:27.13	10

Men–field

Athlete	Event	Final	
Athlete	Event	Result	Rank
Hakim Yahiaoui	Discus F13	42.77	6
Hakim Yahiaoui	Shot put F13	13.27	5

=== Powerlifting ===
Two Algerians qualified to compete in powerlifting, including the country's only female athlete at these Games. Saleha Annab took part in the women's up to 48 kg event, but failed to lift any weight. Djamel Meziani performed better in the men's up to 60g event, lifting 165 kg to finish sixth out of twelve.

Men

Athlete	Event	Total lifted	Rank
Djamel Meziani	+60 kg	165	6

Women

Athlete	Event	Total lifted	Rank
Saleha Annab	+48 kg	NMR	

== See also ==
- Algeria at the Paralympics
- Algeria at the 2000 Summer Olympics
