= Algeria at the 2020 Summer Paralympics =

- IPC code: ALG
- NPC: Algerian National Paralympic Committee

in Tokyo, Japan
- Competitors: 57 in 5 sports
- Medals Ranked 29th: Gold 4 Silver 4 Bronze 4 Total 12

Summer Paralympics appearances (overview)
- 1992; 1996; 2000; 2004; 2008; 2012; 2016; 2020; 2024

Algeria competed at the 2020 Summer Paralympics in Tokyo, Japan, from 24 August to 5 September 2021.

== Medallists ==
Medal	Name	Sport	Event	Date
Gold	Cherine Abdellaoui	Judo	Women's 52 kg	27 August
Gold	Skander Djamil Athmani	Athletics	Men's 400 metres T13	2 September
Gold	Safia Djelal	Athletics	Women's shot put F57	2 September
Gold	Asmahan Boudjadar	Athletics	Women's shot put F33	2 September
Silver	Nassima Saifi	Athletics	Women's discus throw F57	28 August
Silver	Skander Djamil Athmani	Athletics	Men's 100 metres T13	29 August
Silver	Abdelkrim Krai	Athletics	Men's 1500 metres T38	4 September
Silver	Kamel Kardjena	Athletics	Men's shot put F33	4 September
Bronze	Hocine Bettir	Powerlifting	Men's 65 kg	27 August
Bronze	Mounia Gasmi	Athletics	Women's club throw	27 August
Bronze	Walid Ferhah	Athletics	Men's club throw F32	28 August
Bronze	Lynda Hamri	Athletics	Women's long jump T12	29 August

Medals by sport
Sport	Gold medal	Silver medal	Bronze medal	Total
Athletics	3	4	3	10
Judo	1	0	0	1
Powerlifting	0	0	1	1
Total	4	4	4	12

Medals by day
Day	Date	1st place, gold medalist(s)	2nd place, silver medalist(s)	3rd place, bronze medalist(s)	Total
3	27 August	1	0	2	3
4	28 August	0	1	1	2
5	29 August	0	1	1	2
9	2 September	3	0	0	3
11	4 September	0	2	0	2
Total		4	4	4	12

== Competitors ==
#	Sport	Men	Women	Total	Events
1	Athletics	14	8	22	31
2	Goalball	6	0	6	1
3	Judo	2	1	3	3
4	Powerlifting	2	1	3	3
5	Wheelchair Basketball	12	12	24	2
Total		36	22	58	40

== Athletics ==
22 athlete in 31 events:

Number	Athlete	Event	Heats		Final	
Number	Athlete	Event	Result	Rank	Result	Rank
Men's Track & Road
1	Skander Djamil Athmani	100m T13	10.59 AR	1 Q	10.54 AR	2nd place, silver medalist(s)
2	Skander Djamil Athmani	400m T13	47.86 SB	1 Q	46.70 WR	1st place, gold medalist(s)
3	Abdellatif Baka	400m T13	Did not start			
4	Abdellatif Baka	1500m T13	—N/a		3:59.56 SB	8
5	Mohamed Berrahal	100m T51	—N/a		21.94 SB	4
6	Mohamed Berrahal	200m T51	—N/a		40.04 AR	4
7	Sid Ali Bouzourine	400m T36	—N/a		57.91 AR	6
8	Nacer-Eddine Karfas	Marathon T12	—N/a		2:41:02	11
9	Salah Khelaifia	100m T13	11.48 SB	12	Did not advance	
10	Abdelkrim Krai	1500m T38	—N/a		4:03.07	2nd place, silver medalist(s)
11	Samir Nouioua	1500m T46	—N/a		3:55.56 SB	4
Men's Field
12	Mohamed Nadjib Amchi	Shot put F32	—N/a		9.62	5
13	Lahouari Bahlaz	Shot put F32	—N/a		10.37 SB	4
14	Lahouari Bahlaz	Club throw F32	—N/a		33.06 SB	5
15	Mohamed Berrahal	Discus throw F52	—N/a		12.74	7
16	Walid Ferhah	Club throw F32	—N/a		35.34 AR	3rd place, bronze medalist(s)
17	Kamel Kardjena	Shot put F33	—N/a		11.34 SB	2nd place, silver medalist(s)
18	Ahmed Mehideb	Shot put F32	—N/a		9.51 SB	7
19	Ahmed Mehideb	Club throw F32	—N/a		31.34 PB	8
Women's Field
20	Nadjet Boucherf	Club throw F51	—N/a		13.01 PB	5
21	Asmahan Boudjadar	Shot put F33	—N/a		7.10 PR	1st place, gold medalist(s)
22	Achoura Boukoufa	Javelin throw F46	—N/a		31.01	8
23	Safia Djelal	Shot put F57	—N/a		11.29 WR,PB	1st place, gold medalist(s)
24	Safia Djelal	Discus throw F57	—N/a		29.47	5
25	Mounia Gasmi	Shot put F32	—N/a		5.42	6
26	Mounia Gasmi	Club throw F32	—N/a		23.29	3rd place, bronze medalist(s)
27	Lynda Hamri	Long jump T12	—N/a		5.33 SB	3rd place, bronze medalist(s)
28	Nadia Medjmedj	Shot put F57	—N/a		Did not start	
29	Nadia Medjmedj	Javelin throw F56	—N/a		20.02 SB	4
30	Nassima Saifi	Shot put F57	—N/a		10.29 SB	5
31	Nassima Saifi	Discus throw F57	—N/a		30.81	2nd place, silver medalist(s)

== Goalball ==
Algeria men's and women's team qualified via 2020 IBSA African Championship held in Port Said, Egypt.

=== Women ===
On Wednesday 21 April 2021 the International Blind Sports Federation received a 'notification of a late withdrawal of one of the women's teams from the Tokyo 2020 Paralympic Games'. Several days later the International Paralympic Committee announced the withdrawal of the women's team from Algeria, and that Egypt received the slot. No reason behind the team's withdrawal was indicated.

=== Men ===
The following is the Algeria roster in the men's goalball tournament of the 2020 Summer Paralympics.

No.	Player	Class	Date of birth (age)
1	Samir Belhouchat	B2	20 October 1974 (aged 46)
2	Firas Bentria	B1	5 October 1986 (aged 34)
3	Imad Eddine Godmane	B1	23 March 1991 (aged 30)
4	Omar Mebarki	B2	5 February 1994 (aged 27)
5	Djalal Boutadjine	B3	18 December 1994 (aged 26)
7	Abdelhalim Larbi	B1	26 May 1984 (aged 37)

Group stage

Pos	Team	Pld	W	D	L	GF	GA	GD	Pts	Qualification
1	Japan (H)	4	3	0	1	37	15	+22	9	Quarter-finals
2	Brazil	4	3	0	1	35	17	+18	9	Quarter-finals
3	United States	4	2	0	2	25	35	−10	6	Quarter-finals
4	Lithuania	4	1	1	2	24	31	−7	4	Quarter-finals
5	Algeria	4	0	1	3	20	43	−23	1	

Source: TOCOG
(H) Hosts

25 August 2021; 13:15	Algeria	4–13	Japan	Makuhari Messe, Tokyo; Referees: Bas Spaans (Netherlands), Woradet Kultawongwattana (Thailand)
25 August 2021; 13:15	Belhouchat 3 Larbi 1	Report	Kaneko 7 Miyajiki 3 Sano 2 Yamaguchi 1	Makuhari Messe, Tokyo; Referees: Bas Spaans (Netherlands), Woradet Kultawongwattana (Thailand)

26 August 2021; 19:00	Lithuania	7–7	Algeria	Makuhari Messe, Tokyo; Referees: Warrick Jackes (Australia), Svitlana Moroz (Ukraine)
26 August 2021; 19:00	Pavliukianec 3 Pazarauskas 3 Zibolis 1	Report	Belhouchat 7	Makuhari Messe, Tokyo; Referees: Warrick Jackes (Australia), Svitlana Moroz (Ukraine)

27 August 2021; 20:30	Brazil	10–4	Algeria	Makuhari Messe, Tokyo; Referees: Robert Avery (Great Britain), Raquel Gomez Aguado (Spain)
27 August 2021; 20:30	Moreno 5 Sousa 4 De Melo 1	Report	Belhouchat 4	Makuhari Messe, Tokyo; Referees: Robert Avery (Great Britain), Raquel Gomez Aguado (Spain)

29 August 2021; 17:30	Algeria	5–13	United States	Makuhari Messe, Tokyo; Referees: Romualdas Vaitiekus (Lithuania), Warrick Jackes (Australia)
29 August 2021; 17:30	Belhouchat 4 Larbi 1	Report	Young 8 Simpson 3 Walker 2	Makuhari Messe, Tokyo; Referees: Romualdas Vaitiekus (Lithuania), Warrick Jackes (Australia)

== Judo ==
Number	Athlete	Event	Rank
Men
1	Ishak Ouldkouider	Men's –60kg	9
2	Abderrahmane Chetouane	Men's –90kg	9
Women
3	Cherine Abdellaoui	Women's –52kg	1st place, gold medalist(s)

== Powerlifting ==
Athlete	Event	Result	Rank
Men
Hadj Ahmed Beyour	Men's −49 kg	143 kg	7
Hocine Bettir	Men's −65 kg	192 kg	3rd place, bronze medalist(s)
Women
Samira Guerioua	Women's −45 kg	90 kg	4

== Wheelchair basketball ==
The men's and women's team qualified after winning the gold medal at the 2020 African Zonal Championship held in Johannesburg, South Africa.

Summary

Key:

- ET: After extra time

Team	Event	Group Stage						Quarterfinal	Semifinal	Final / BM / Placing match	
Team	Event	Opposition Score	Opposition Score	Opposition Score	Opposition Score	Opposition Score	Rank	Opposition Score	Opposition Score	Opposition Score	Rank
Algeria men's	Men's tournament	Great Britain; L 43-70	Australia; L 37-83	Iran; L 47-81	Germany; L 50-71	United States; L 25-86	6	Did not advance		Colombia; L 47-70	12
Algeria women's	Women's tournament	China; L 25-74	Netherlands; L 18-109	Spain; L 8-80	United States; L 21-62	—N/a	5	Did not advance		Australia; L 32-71	10

=== Men ===
The following is the Algeria roster in the men's wheelchair basketball tournament of the 2020 Summer Paralympics.

Algeria men's national wheelchair basketball team - 2020 Summer Paralympics roster
Players
Coaches

No.	Name	Age – Date of birth	Pts.
4	Oussama Baghradji	24 – 5 November 1996	1.5
5	Abdennour Benredouane	30 – 16 August 1991	4.0
6	Ayoub Badrane	27 – 20 March 1994	2.5
7	Rafik Mansouri	40 – 7 October 1980	2.0
8	Mostefa Abassi	43 – 25 September 1977	2.5
9	Nabil Guedoun	44 – 4 August 1977	4.0
10	Hakim Badache	35 – 3 August 1986	4.0
11	Samir Ladjadjat	40 – 31 March 1981	3.5
12	Abderraouf Abbad	34 – 27 October 1986	1.0
13	Omar Zidi	37 – 23 January 1984	4.0
14	Abdelkarim Megueddem	35 – 4 June 1986	3.0
15	Bilel Ayache	40 – 2 June 1981	3.5

Head coach

Mustapha Brahimi

Assistant coach(es)

Boualem Benazouz

Legend

- Age - describes age on 24 August 2021

=== Women ===
The following is the Algeria roster in the women's wheelchair basketball tournament of the 2020 Summer Paralympics.

Algeria women's national wheelchair basketball team - 2020 Summer Paralympics roster
Players
Coaches

No.	Name	Age – Date of birth	Pts.
4	Nebia Mehimda	36 – 31 July 1985	3.0
5	Naoual Khedir	34 – 13 June 1987	4.0
6	Yamina Ghoul	48 – 30 August 1972	1.5
7	Hafida Belhadef	43 – 28 March 1978	4.0
8	Fatima Bouzidi	32 – 27 August 1988	1.0
9	Djamila Khemgani	39 – 12 January 1982	4.0
11	Dahbia Semati	44 – 6 September 1976	1.5
12	Kheira Zairi	36 – 28 September 1984	4.0
13	Zohra Sellami	39 – 14 March 1982	2.5
14	Samiha Abdelali	33 – 25 April 1988	2.5
15	Nourhane Boublal	28 – 23 June 1993	4.5

Head coach

Ahmed Taghiche

Assistant coach(es)

Youcef Houri

Legend

- Age - describes age on 24 August 2021

== See also ==
- Algeria at the Paralympics
- Algeria at the 2020 Summer Olympics
