= Algeria at the 1996 Summer Paralympics =

- IPC code: ALG
- NPC: Algerian National Paralympic Committee

in Atlanta
- Competitors: 9 in 2 sports
- Medals Ranked 40th: Gold 2 Silver 2 Bronze 3 Total 7

Summer Paralympics appearances (overview)
- 1992; 1996; 2000; 2004; 2008; 2012; 2016; 2020; 2024

Athletes from the Algeria competed at the 1996 Summer Paralympics in Atlanta, United States.

== Competitors ==
Algeria had a 9-member large delegation in Atlanta, all of whom were men. They would not send women until the 2000 Games.

Sport	Men	Women	Total
Athletics	7	-	7
Judo	2	-	2
Total	9	-	9

== Medallists ==
Medal	Name	Sport	Event	Time in the final
Gold	Mohamed Allek	Athletics	Men's 100m (T36)	
Gold	Mohamed Allek	Athletics	Men's 200m (T36)	
Silver	Faouzi Bellele	Athletics	Men's 5000m (T34-37)	
Silver	Youcef Boudjeltia	Athletics	Men's 400m (T12)	
Bronze	Faouzi Bellele	Athletics	Men's 800m (T34-36)	
Bronze	Faouzi Bellele	Athletics	Men's 1500m (T34-37)	
Bronze	Bachir Zergoune	Athletics	Men's 800m (T44-46)	

== Events ==
=== Athletics ===
Men–track

Athlete	Event	Heat		Semifinal		Final	
Athlete	Event	Result	Rank	Result	Rank	Result	Rank
Omar Abi	100 m T53	16.54	23	did not advance			
Omar Abi	1500 m T52-53	DNS		did not advance			
Omar Abi	Marathon T52-53	—N/a				2:04:13	51
Mohamed Allek	100 m T36	—N/a				12.03 WR	1st place, gold medalist(s)
Mohamed Allek	200 m T36	—N/a		24.61 WR	1Q	24.32 WR	1st place, gold medalist(s)
Mohamed Allek	400 m T36	—N/a				DNS	
Faouzi Bellele	800 m T34-36	—N/a				2:12.00	3rd place, bronze medalist(s)
Faouzi Bellele	1500 m T34-37	—N/a				4:26.78	3rd place, bronze medalist(s)
Faouzi Bellele	5000 m T34-37	—N/a				16:49.35	2nd place, silver medalist(s)
Youcef Boudjeltia	100 m T12	—N/a		DNS		did not advance	
Youcef Boudjeltia	200 m T12	—N/a		23.31	4Q	23.70	6
Youcef Boudjeltia	400 m T12	—N/a		51.91	2Q	51.09	2nd place, silver medalist(s)
Bachir Zergoune	800 m T44-46	—N/a		2:01.51	4Q	1:57.05	3rd place, bronze medalist(s)
Bachir Zergoune	1500 m T44-46	—N/a				4:15.39	6
Bachir Zergoune	5000 m T44-46	—N/a				DNF	

Men–field

Athlete	Event	Final	
Athlete	Event	Result	Rank
Hocine Saadoune	Shot put F12	12.96	4
Hakim Yahiaoui	Discus F12	NMR	
Hakim Yahiaoui	Shot put F12	12.26	6

=== Judo ===
Men

Athlete	Event	Round of 16	Quarterfinals	Semifinals	First repechage round	Repechage semifinals	Final	
Athlete	Event	Opposition Result	Opposition Result	Opposition Result	Opposition Result	Opposition Result	Opposition Result	Rank
Abdelkader Belaouni	+78 kg	Hsiao (TPE); L (ippon)	Did not advance					
Mohamed Meghnai	+86 kg	BYE	Boedo (ESP); L (ippon)	Did not advance	Uwano (JPN); L (ippon)	Did not advance		

== See also ==
- Algeria at the Paralympics
- Algeria at the 1996 Summer Olympics
