= Algeria at the 2024 Summer Paralympics =

2024 sporting event delegation in Paris

- Flag of Algeria
- IPC code: ALG
- NPC: Algerian National Paralympic Committee

in Paris, France August 28, 2024 – September 8, 2024
- Competitors: 26 (18 men and 8 women) in 4 sports
- Flag bearers (opening): Mohamed Berrahal; Safia Djelal
- Flag bearers (closing): Skander Djamil Athmani; Lynda Hamri
- Medals Ranked 25th: Gold 6 Silver 0 Bronze 5 Total 11

Summer Paralympics appearances (overview)
- 1992; 1996; 2000; 2004; 2008; 2012; 2016; 2020; 2024

Algeria competed at the 2024 Summer Paralympics in Paris, France, from 28 August to 8 September 2024.

== Medalists ==
The following Algerian competitors won medals at the games. In the discipline sections below, the medalists' names are bolded.

Medal	Name	Sport	Event	Date
Gold	Nassima Saifi	Athletics	Women's discus throw F57	31 August
Gold	Skander Djamil Athmani	Athletics	Men's 100 m T13	1 September
Gold	Skander Djamil Athmani	Athletics	Men's 400 m T13	5 September
Gold	Safia Djelal	Athletics	Women's shot put F57	5 September
Gold	Abdelkader Bouamer	Judo	Men's 60 kg J1	5 September
Gold	Brahim Guendouz	Paracanoeing	Men's KL3	7 September
Bronze	Ahmed Mehideb	Athletics	Men's club throw F32	31 August
Bronze	Lynda Hamri	Athletics	Women's long jump T12	1 September
Bronze	Nassima Saifi	Athletics	Women's shot put F57	5 September
Bronze	Ishak Ouldkouider	Judo	Men's 60 kg J2	5 September
Bronze	Hocine Bettir	Powerlifting	Men's 65 kg	5 September

Medals by sport
Sport	1st place, gold medalist(s)	2nd place, silver medalist(s)	3rd place, bronze medalist(s)	Total
Athletics	4	0	3	**7**
Judo	1	0	1	**2**
Powerlifting	0	0	1	**1**
Paracanoeing	1	0	0	**1**
Total	6	0	5	11

Medals by day
Day	Date	1st place, gold medalist(s)	2nd place, silver medalist(s)	3rd place, bronze medalist(s)	Total
1	29 August	0	0	0	**0**
2	30 August	0	0	0	**0**
3	31 August	1	0	1	**2**
4	1 September	1	0	1	**2**
5	2 September	0	0	0	**0**
6	3 September	0	0	0	**0**
7	4 September	0	0	0	**0**
8	5 September	3	0	3	**6**
9	6 September	0	0	0	**0**
10	7 September	1	0	0	**1**
Total		6	0	5	11

Medals by gender
Gender	1st place, gold medalist(s)	2nd place, silver medalist(s)	3rd place, bronze medalist(s)	Total	Percentage
Male	4	0	3	**7**	63,64
Female	2	0	2	**4**	36,36
Total	6	0	5	11	100%

== Competitors ==
The following is the list of number of competitors in the Games, including game-eligible alternates in team sports.

Sport	Men	Women	Total
Athletics	13	7	20
Judo	2	0	2
Paracanoeing	1	0	1
Powerlifting	2	1	3
Total	18	8	26

== Athletics ==
Algerian track and field athletes achieved quota places for the following events based on their results at the 2023 World Championships, 2024 World Championships, or through high performance allocation, as long as they meet the minimum entry standard (MES).

Key

- Note–Ranks given for track events are within the athlete's heat only
- Q = Qualified for the next round
- q = Qualified for the next round as a fastest loser or, in field events, by position without achieving the qualifying target
- DQ = Disqualified
- PR = Paralympic Record
- AR = Area (or continental) Record
- NR = National Record
- N/A = Round not applicable for the event
- Bye = Athlete not required to compete in round

Track & road events

Athlete	Event	Heat		Final	
Athlete	Event	Result	Rank	Result	Rank
Skander Djamil Athmani	Men's 100 m T13	10.51	1 Q	10.42 PR	1st place, gold medalist(s)
Skander Djamil Athmani	Men's 400 m T13	—N/a		47.43	1st place, gold medalist(s)
Mokhtar Didane	Men's 100 m T36	DQ		Did not advance	
Fakhr Eddine Thelaidjia	Men's 100 m T36	12.58	4 q	12.56	8
Fakhr Eddine Thelaidjia	Men's 400 m T36	—N/a		53.91 NR	6
Mohamed Berrahal	Men's 100 m T51	—N/a		21.83	4
Mohamed Berrahal	Men's 200 m T51	—N/a		40.91	4
Sofiane Hamdi	Men's 200 m T37	23.80	5	Did not advance	
Sofiane Hamdi	Men's 400 m T37	53.46	5	Did not advance	
Abdellatif Baka	Men's 400 m T13	—N/a		52.25	7
Abdellatif Baka	Men's 1500 m T13	—N/a		3:47.16 NR	6
Abdelkrim Krai	Men's 1500 m T38	—N/a		4:16.19	5
Samir Nouioua	Men's 1500 m T46	—N/a		3:57.30	5

Field events
Men

Athlete	Event	Final	
Athlete	Event	Distance	Position
Lahouari Bahlaz	Men's shot put F32	9.70	4
Walid Ferhah	Men's shot put F32	9.20	5
Walid Ferhah	Men's club throw F32	37.99	4
Ahmed Mehideb	Men's shot put F32	8.56	8
Ahmed Mehideb	Men's club throw F32	38.61	3rd place, bronze medalist(s)
Kamel Kardjena	Men's shot put F33	11.16	4
Mohamed Berrahal	Men's discus throw F52	12.07	9
Abdelhak Missouni	Men's club throw F32	32.91	8

Women

Athlete	Event	Final	
Athlete	Event	Distance	Position
Lynda Hamri	Women's long jump T12	5.30	3rd place, bronze medalist(s)
Mounia Gasmi	Women's shot put F32	5.89	7
Mounia Gasmi	Women's club throw F32	18.66	12
Asmahan Boudjadar	Women's shot put F33	7.30	4
Safia Djelal	Women's shot put F57	11.56	1st place, gold medalist(s)
Safia Djelal	Women's discus throw F57	29.17	8
Nassima Saifi	Women's shot put F57	10.74	3rd place, bronze medalist(s)
Nassima Saifi	Women's discus throw F57	35.55 PR	1st place, gold medalist(s)
Bakhta Benallou	Women's javelin throw F13	29.63	8
Nadia Medjmedj	Women's javelin throw F56	17.80	7

== Judo ==
As host nation, France directly qualifies eight male and eight female judoka.

Athlete	Event	Round of 16	Quarterfinals	Semifinals	Repechage 1st round	Repechage Final	Final / BM	
Athlete	Event	Opposition Score	Opposition Score	Opposition Score	Opposition Score	Opposition Score	Opposition Score	Rank
Abdelkader Bouamer	Men's 60 kg J1	Kongsuk (THA) W 10-0	de Oliveira (BRA) W 10-0	Junaedi (INA) W 1-0	—N/a		Abadi (IRI) W 1-0	1st place, gold medalist(s)
Ishak Ouldkouider	Men's 60 kg J2	—N/a	Khorava (UKR) W 10-1	Zurabiani (GEO) L 0-10	—N/a		da Silva (BRA) W 10-0	3rd place, bronze medalist(s)

== Paracanoeing ==
For the first time in Paralympics Games, Algeria earned quota places for the following events through the 2023 ICF Canoe Sprint World Championships in Duisburg, Germany.

Athlete	Event	Heats		Semifinal		Final	
Athlete	Event	Time	Rank	Time	Rank	Time	Rank
Brahim Guendouz	Men's KL3	42.23	2 SF	41.40	1 FA	39.91	1st place, gold medalist(s)

== Powerlifting ==
Athlete	Event	Attempts (kg)				Result (kg)	Rank
Athlete	Event	1	2	3	PL	Result (kg)	Rank
Hadj Ahmed Beyour	Men's −49 kg	140	145	~~151~~	—N/a	145	9
Hocine Bettir	Men's −65 kg	197	204	209	—N/a	209	3rd place, bronze medalist(s)
Samira Guerioua	Women's −45 kg	85	~~91~~	~~91~~	—N/a	85	8

== See also ==
- Algeria at the 2024 Summer Olympics
- Algeria at the Paralympics
