= Algeria at the 2016 Summer Paralympics =

- IPC code: ALG
- NPC: Algerian National Paralympic Committee

in Rio de Janeiro
- Competitors: 60 in 6 sports
- Medals Ranked 27th: Gold 4 Silver 5 Bronze 7 Total 16

Summer Paralympics appearances (overview)
- 1992; 1996; 2000; 2004; 2008; 2012; 2016; 2020; 2024

Algeria competed at the 2016 Summer Paralympics in Rio de Janeiro, Brazil, from 7 to 18 September 2016.

== Disability classifications ==
Every participant at the Paralympics has their disability grouped into one of ten disability categories: impaired muscle power, impaired passive range of movement, limb deficiency, leg length difference, short stature, hypertonia, ataxia, athetosis, vision impairment and intellectual impairment. Each Paralympic sport then has its own classifications, dependent upon the specific physical demands of competition. Events are given a code, made of numbers and letters, describing the type of event and classification of the athletes competing. Some sports, such as athletics, divide athletes by both the category and severity of their disabilities, other sports, for example swimming, group competitors from different categories together, the only separation being based on the severity of the disability.

== Competitors ==
Sport	Men	Women	Total
Athletics	13	6	19
Goalball	6	6	12
Judo	2	1	3
Powerlifting	1	1	2
Wheelchair basketball	12	12	24
Total	34	26	60

== Medallists ==
Algeria finished the Games ranked fourth among African nations for total gold medals won in Rio with 4. They were behind Nigeria, South Africa and Tunisia. Algeria finished with 16 medals total.

Medal	Name	Sport	Event	Date
Gold	Abdellatif Baka	Athletics	Men's 1500 metres T13	11 September
Gold	Nassima Saifi	Athletics	Women's discus throw F56/57	15 September
Gold	Samir Nouioua	Athletics	Men's 1500 metres T46	16 September
Gold	Asmahan Boudjadar	Athletics	Women's shot put F33	16 September
Silver	Lahouari Bahlaz	Athletics	Men's shot put F32	8 September
Silver	Nassima Saifi	Athletics	Women's shot put F56/57	8 September
Silver	Mounia Gasmi	Athletics	Women's club throw F31/32	9 September
Silver	Kamel Kardjena	Athletics	Men's shot put F33	10 September
Silver	Mohamed Berrahal	Athletics	Men's 100 metres T51	13 September
Bronze	Cherine Abdellaoui	Judo	Women's 52 kg	8 September
Bronze	Nadia Medjemedj	Athletics	Women's shot put F56/57	8 September
Bronze	Nadia Medjemedj	Athletics	Women's javelin throw F56	10 September
Bronze	Madjid Djemai	Athletics	Men's 1500 metres T37	11 September
Bronze	Lynda Hamri	Athletics	Women's long jump T12	13 September
Bronze	Mohamed Fouad Hamoumou	Athletics	Men's 400 metres T13	15 September
Bronze	Sofiane Hamdi	Athletics	Men's 400 metres T37	16 September

Medals by sport
Sport	Gold medal	Silver medal	Bronze medal	Total
Athletics	4	5	6	15
Judo	0	0	1	1
Total	4	5	7	16

Medals by day
Day	Date	1st place, gold medalist(s)	2nd place, silver medalist(s)	3rd place, bronze medalist(s)	Total
1	8 September	0	2	2	4
2	9 September	0	1	0	1
3	10 September	0	1	1	2
4	11 September	1	0	1	2
6	13 September	0	1	1	2
8	15 September	1	0	1	2
9	16 September	2	0	1	3
Total		4	5	7	16

Multiple medalists
Name	Sport	1st place, gold medalist(s)	2nd place, silver medalist(s)	3rd place, bronze medalist(s)	Total
Nassima Saifi	Athletics	1	1	0	2
Nadia Medjemedj	Athletics	0	0	2	2

== Athletics ==
Key1

- WR = World record
- PR = Paralympic record
- AF = African record
- RR = Regional record
- NR = National record
- SB = Seasonal best record
- PB = Personal best record

Key2

- Note–Ranks given for preliminary rounds are within the athlete's heat only
- Q = Qualified for the next round
- q = Qualified for the next round as a fastest loser or by position without achieving the qualifying target
- N/A = Round not applicable for the event
- Bye = Athlete not required to compete in round

Men's Track

Athlete	Events	Heat		Final	
Athlete	Events	Time	Rank	Time	Rank
Abdellatif Baka	1500 metres T13	—N/a		3:48.29 WR	1st place, gold medalist(s)
Fouad Baka	1500 metres T13	—N/a		3:49.84 PB	4
Madjid Djemai	1500 metres T37	—N/a		4:17.28	3rd place, bronze medalist(s)
Sofiane Hamdi	100 metres T37	12.08	5	Did not advance	
Sofiane Hamdi	400 metres T37	54.28	3 Q	53.01 SB	3rd place, bronze medalist(s)
Mohamed Berrahal	100 metres T51	—N/a		21.70	2nd place, silver medalist(s)
Mohamed Berrahal	400 metres T51	—N/a		1:24.06	4
Sid Ali Bouzourine	400 metres T36	—N/a		1:00.22	7
Sid Ali Bouzourine	800 metres T36	—N/a		2:15.03	4
Abdellatif Baka	400 metres T13	50.15	2 Q	DNS	
Fouad Baka	400 metres T13	49.04 PB	3 Q	49.09	4
Mohamed Fouad Hamoumou	400 metres T13	49.08	1 Q	48.04 PB	3rd place, bronze medalist(s)
Samir Nouioua	1500 metres T46	—N/a		3:59.46 SB	1st place, gold medalist(s)

Men's Field

Athlete	Events	Mark(m)	Rank
Lahouari Bahlaz	Shot Put F32	9.40	2nd place, silver medalist(s)
Abderrahim Missouni	Shot Put F32	8.17	6
Karim Betina	Shot Put F32	7.27	9
Lahouari Bahlaz	club throw F32	DNS	
Abderrahim Missouni	club throw F32	DNS	
Mounir Bakiri	club throw F32	DNS	
Kamel Kardjena	Shot Put F33	10.94	2nd place, silver medalist(s)
Firas Bentria	long jump F11	5.59	9

Women's Track

Athlete	Events	Heat		Semifinals		Final	
Athlete	Events	Time	Rank	Time	Rank	Time	Rank
Lynda Hamri	100 metres T12	13.52 q	2	13.80	4	Did not advance	

Women's Field

Athlete	Events	Mark(m)	Rank
Louadjeda Benoumessad	javelin throw F34	16.96	5
Nadia Medjemedj	javelin throw F56	20.24	3rd place, bronze medalist(s)
Nassima Saifi	shot put F56/57	10.77	2nd place, silver medalist(s)
Nadia Medjemedj	shot put F56/57	9.92	3rd place, bronze medalist(s)
Safia Djelal	shot put F56/57	NM	
Mounia Gasmi	club throw F32	25.41 PB	2nd place, silver medalist(s)
Lynda Hamri	long jump T12	5.53 SB	3rd place, bronze medalist(s)
Nassima Saifi	discus throw F57	33.33	1st place, gold medalist(s)
Safia Djelal	discus throw F57	27.34	4
Mounia Gasmi	shot put F32	3.99	4
Asmahan Boudjadar	shot put F33	5.72	1st place, gold medalist(s)

== Goalball ==
=== Men's tournament ===
Algeria's men enter the tournament ranked 12th in the world. The following is the Algeria roster in the men's goalball tournament of the 2016 Summer Paralympics.

No.	Player	Class	Date of birth (age)
1	Samir Belhouchat	B2	20 October 1974 (aged 41)
2	Ishak Boutaleb	B1	23 April 1987 (aged 29)
3	Imad Eddine Godmane	B1	23 March 1991 (aged 25)
4	Abdelhalim Larbi	B1	26 May 1984 (aged 32)
5	Mohamed Mokrane	B2	9 October 1974 (aged 41)
6	Djilali Chenaoui	B3	20 May 1992 (aged 24)

Pos	Team	Pld	W	D	L	GF	GA	GD	Pts	Qualification
1	Brazil (H)	4	4	0	0	42	15	+27	12	Quarter-finals
2	Sweden	4	3	0	1	33	23	+10	9	Quarter-finals
3	Germany	4	1	0	3	24	26	−2	3	Quarter-finals
4	Canada	4	1	0	3	26	39	−13	3	Quarter-finals
5	Algeria	4	1	0	3	25	47	−22	3	

Source: Paralympic.org
(H) Hosts

8 September 2016; 13:15	Algeria	0–10	Germany	Future Arena, Rio de Janeiro; Referees: Nejc Jakic (SLO), Daniel Voltan (BRA)
8 September 2016; 13:15		Report	Horauf 5 Feistle 4 Steiger 1	Future Arena, Rio de Janeiro; Referees: Nejc Jakic (SLO), Daniel Voltan (BRA)

9 September 2016; 17:30	Sweden	12–6	Algeria	Future Arena, Rio de Janeiro; Referees: Daniel Voltan (BRA), Yoshinori Nii (JPN)
9 September 2016; 17:30	Weichel 5 Björkstrand 4 Seremeti 3	Report	Belhouchat 5 Mokrane 1	Future Arena, Rio de Janeiro; Referees: Daniel Voltan (BRA), Yoshinori Nii (JPN)

11 September 2016; 09:00	Brazil	12–2	Algeria	Future Arena, Rio de Janeiro; Referees: Alexander Knecht (GER), Bülent Kimyon (TUR)
11 September 2016; 09:00	Moreno 6 Marques 3 Sousa 2 Celente 1	Report	Mokrane 2	Future Arena, Rio de Janeiro; Referees: Alexander Knecht (GER), Bülent Kimyon (TUR)

12 September 2016; 11:30	Algeria	17–13	Canada	Future Arena, Rio de Janeiro; Referees: Raili Sipura (FIN), Alexander Knecht (GER)
12 September 2016; 11:30	Mokrane 9 Godmane 6 Larbi 1 Boutaleb 1	Report	Nesbitt 6 Hache 3 Gaulin 3 Larbi 1 (o.g)	Future Arena, Rio de Janeiro; Referees: Raili Sipura (FIN), Alexander Knecht (GER)

=== Women's tournament ===
The Algeria women's national goalball team qualified for the Rio Games after winning the African championship by defeating Egypt 11–1 in the final. Other teams participating in the qualifier included Tunisia and Morocco. Ghana was scheduled to compete, but pulled out of the event. The team played in a Rio warmup tournament in Malmo, Sweden where they finished tenth. The national team is coached by Mohamed Bettahrat. Algeria's women enter the tournament ranked 23rd in the world.

The following is the Algeria roster in the women's goalball tournament of the 2016 Summer Paralympics.

No.	Player	Class	Date of birth (age)
1	Nawel Belhamiti	B1	1 June 1980 (aged 36)
2	Cherifa Bouchikhi	B2	18 January 1985 (aged 31)
4	Yamina Belarbi	B3	19 March 1990 (aged 26)
5	Bakhta Benallou	B3	5 May 1990 (aged 26)
6	Saida Bourouba	B3	1 August 1990 (aged 26)

Pos	Team	Pld	W	D	L	GF	GA	GD	Pts	Qualification
1	Brazil (H)	4	3	0	1	25	7	+18	9	Quarter-finals
2	United States	4	3	0	1	25	13	+12	9	Quarter-finals
3	Japan	4	2	1	1	13	8	+5	7	Quarter-finals
4	Israel	4	1	1	2	16	15	+1	4	Quarter-finals
5	Algeria	4	0	0	4	1	37	−36	0	

Source: Paralympic.org
(H) Hosts

9 September 2016; 14:30	Algeria	0–10 (walkover)	United States

10 September 2016; 18:45	Israel	10–0 (walkover)	Algeria

12 September 2016; 15:30	Japan	7–1	Algeria	Future Arena, Rio de Janeiro; Referees: Nejc Jakic (SLO), Rudi Janssen (BEL)
12 September 2016; 15:30	Temma 3 Kakehata 2 Adachi 2	Report	Benallou 1	Future Arena, Rio de Janeiro; Referees: Nejc Jakic (SLO), Rudi Janssen (BEL)

13 September 2016; 11:30	Algeria	0–10	Brazil	Future Arena, Rio de Janeiro; Referees: Patricia Fras (SLO), Dawna Christy (CAN)
13 September 2016; 11:30		Report	Amorim 6 Custodio 3 Rocha 1	Future Arena, Rio de Janeiro; Referees: Patricia Fras (SLO), Dawna Christy (CAN)

== Judo ==
With one pathway for qualification being having a top finish at the 2014 IBSA Judo World Championships, Algeria earned a qualifying spot in Rio base on the performance of Noura Mouloud in the men's -60 kg event. The B3 Judoka finished first in his class.

Men

Athlete	Event	Round of 16	Quarterfinals	Semifinals	First repechage round	Repechage semifinals	Final	
Athlete	Event	Opposition Result	Opposition Result	Opposition Result	Opposition Result	Opposition Result	Opposition Result	Rank
Mouloud Noura	Men's -60 kg	Bye	Bologa (ROU); L 000-000 S	Did not advance	Minjae (KOR); L 000-010	Did not advance		
Mehdi Meskine	Men's -73 kg	Gavilan (ESP); W 000-000 S	Sayidov (UZB); L 000-111	Did not advance		Kitazono (JPN); L 000-100	Did not advance	

Women

Athlete	Event	Round of 16	Quarterfinals	Semifinals	First repechage round	Repechage semifinals	Final	
Athlete	Event	Opposition Result	Opposition Result	Opposition Result	Opposition Result	Opposition Result	Opposition Result	Rank
Cherine Abdellaoui	Women's -52 kg	Bye	Gagne (CAN); W 000-000 S	Martinet (FRA); L 000-100	Did not advance		Ferreira (BRA); W 001-000	3rd place, bronze medalist(s)

== Powerlifting ==
Samira Guerioua qualified to represent Algeria at the 2016 Games in powerlifting. The 32-year-old is a member of the Bir Mourad Rais club. Nationally, she is coached by Mohamed-Salah Ben Atta.

Women

Athlete	Event	Result	Rank
Samira Guerioua	-45 kg	85.0	6
Hocine Bettir	-65 kg	NMR	

== Wheelchair basketball ==
=== Men's tournament ===
The Algeria men's national wheelchair basketball team has qualified for the 2016 Rio Paralympics. The team participated in the Arab Championship "Open" in July 2016 as part of their Rio preparation efforts. At the event, Algeria defeated Iraq by a score of 48–24, Morocco by a score of 77–72, South Africa by a score of 79–53, Kuwait by a score of 87-25 and Saudi Arabia by a score of 63–33. Nabil Gueddoun led his team in scoring going into elimination play.

The following is the Algeria roster in the men's wheelchair basketball tournament of the 2016 Summer Paralympics.

Algeria men's national wheelchair basketball team – 2016 Summer Paralympics roster
Players
Coaches

Pos.	No.	Name	Age – Date of birth	Pts.
F	4	Mohamed Reda Bentrat	38 – 7 July 1978
C	5	Faical Cheraitia	35 – 9 August 1981
G	6	Ayoub Badrane	22 – 20 March 1994
F	7	Rafik Mansouri	35 – 7 October 1980
G	8	Mostefa Abassi	38 – 25 September 1977
F	9	Nabil Guedoun	39 – 4 August 1977
G	10	Djamal Hamache	45 – 24 October 1970
C	12	Abdelkarim Megueddem	30 – 4 June 1986
F	13	Abderraouf Abbad	29 – 27 October 1986
G	14	Nouri Ksouri	40 – 30 November 1975
C	15	Bilel Ayache	35 – 2 June 1981

Head coach

- (Algeria) Lahcene Tagmi

Assistant coach(es)

- (Algeria) Mustapha Brahimi

Legend

- Club – describes last club before the tournament
- Age – describes age on 10 September 2016

Pos	Team	Pld	W	L	PF	PA	PD	Pts	Qualification
1	United States	5	5	0	402	206	+196	10	Quarter-finals
2	Great Britain	5	4	1	364	263	+101	9	Quarter-finals
3	Brazil (H)	5	2	3	309	314	−5	7 (Note: Head-to-head record: Brazil 3 pts, +11 PD; Germany 3 pts, +6 PD; Iran 3 pts, −17 PD)	Quarter-finals
4	Germany	5	2	3	337	314	+23	7	Quarter-finals
5	Iran	5	2	3	295	361	−66	7	9th/10th place playoff
6	Algeria	5	0	5	187	436	−249	5	11th/12th place playoff

Source: Paralympic.org
Rules for classification: 1) Points; 2) Head-to-head results; 3) Points difference; 4) Points scored.
(H) Hosts
Notes:

8 September 2016
11:45

Report

Great Britain	93–31	Algeria
Scoring by quarter: 23–10, 20–13, 20–6, 30–2
Pts: Sagar 19; Rebs: Sagar 11; Asts: Brown, Warburton 7		Pts: Ayache, Mansouri 8 Rebs: Abassi, Guedoun 5 Asts: Guedoun 5

Rio Olympic Arena, Rio de Janeiro
Referees: Mati Quintana

9 September 2016
21:00

Report

Algeria	43–82	Brazil
Scoring by quarter: 16–21, 10–18, 4–23, 13–20
Pts: Guedoun 24; Rebs: Guedoun 12; Asts: Mansouri 5		Pts: Candido Sanchez 24; Rebs: Candido Sanchez, De Miranda 9 Asts: Candido Sanchez 7

Rio Olympic Arena, Rio de Janeiro
Referees: Nurredin Bilmez

10 September 2016
18:00

Report

Germany	97–41	Algeria
Scoring by quarter: 22–14, 32–3, 33–16, 20–8
Pts: Bohme 29; Rebs: Bienek 8 Asts: Bienek 11		Pts: Guedoun 22; Rebs: Guedoun 8 Asts: Guedoun 6

Carioca Arena 1, Rio de Janeiro
Referees: Alexandre Lapointe

11 September 2016
18:00

Report

Algeria	24–92	United States
Scoring by quarter: 4–27, 6–22, 2–24, 12–19
Pts: Guedoun 10; Rebs: Abassi 4 Asts: Guedoun 5		Pts: Williams 17; Rebs: Jennifer 5 Asts: Serio 9

Carioca Arena 1, Rio de Janeiro
Referees: Mati Quintana

12 September 2016
14:00

Report

Iran	72–48	Algeria
Scoring by quarter: 24–14, 19–13, 13–12, 16–9
Pts: Abedi 23; Rebs: Gholamazad 12; Asts: Hadiazhar 7		Pts: Guedoun 16; Rebs: Ayache 5 Asts: Guedoun 9

Rio Olympic Arena, Rio de Janeiro
Referees: Krunoslav Peic

11th/12th place playoff

14 September 2016
19:30

Report

Canada	70–51	Algeria
Scoring by quarter: 13–5, 17–17, 20–15, 20–14
Pts: Goncin 19; Rebs: Miller 7 Asts: Hedges 6		Pts: Guedoun 22; Rebs: Guedoun 8 Asts: Guedoun 8

Rio Olympic Arena, Rio de Janeiro
Referees: Philip Haines

=== Women's tournament ===
The Algeria women's national wheelchair basketball team qualified for the 2016 Rio Paralympics. As hosts, Brazil got to choose which group they were put into. They were partnered with Algeria, who would be put in the group they did not choose. Brazil chose Group A, which included Canada, Germany, Great Britain and Argentina. Algeria ended up in Group B with the United States, the Netherlands, France and China.

The following is the Algeria roster in the women's wheelchair basketball tournament of the 2016 Summer Paralympics.

Algeria women's national wheelchair basketball team – 2016 Summer Paralympics roster
Players
Coaches

Pos.	No.	Name	Age – Date of birth	Pts.
F	4	Nebia Mehimda	31 – 31 July 1985
G	5	Naoual Khedir	29 – 13 June 1987
F	6	Yamina Ghoul	44 – 30 August 1972
C	7	Menouba Foulani	35 – 15 March 1981
F	8	Houria Moussa	28 – 13 December 1987
G	9	Djamila Khemgani	34 – 12 January 1982
F	10	Halima Kedjoun	30 – 23 January 1986
F	11	Dahbia Semati	40 – 6 September 1976
C	12	Kheira Zairi	31 – 28 September 1984
F	13	Zohra Sellami	34 – 14 March 1982
G	14	Samiha Abdelali	28 – 25 April 1988
C	15	Nourhane Boublal	23 – 23 June 1993

Head coach

- (Algeria) Djawed Zigh

Assistant coach(es)

- (Algeria) Mohammed Tahar Kisrane

Legend

- Club – describes last club before the tournament
- Age – describes age on 10 September 2016

Pos	Team	Pld	W	L	PF	PA	PD	Pts	Qualification
1	United States	4	4	0	288	138	+150	8	Quarter-finals
2	Netherlands	4	3	1	300	148	+152	7	Quarter-finals
3	China	4	2	2	212	187	+25	6	Quarter-finals
4	France	4	1	3	178	266	−88	5	Quarter-finals
5	Algeria	4	0	4	93	332	−239	4	9th/10th place playoff

Source: Paralympic.org
Rules for classification: 1) Points; 2) Head-to-head results; 3) Points difference; 4) Points scored.

8 September 2016
21:00

Report

Algeria	16–88	China
Scoring by quarter: 6–23, 0–18, 2–30, 8–17
Pts: Khemgani 6 Rebs: Khemgani 8		Pts: Lyu 19; Rebs: Lei 8 Asts: Long, Deng 7

Rio Olympic Arena, Rio de Janeiro
Referees: Nurredin Bilmez

9 September 2016
17:30

Report

Netherlands	107–29	Algeria
Scoring by quarter: 34–10, 27–2, 24–8, 22–9
Pts: Beijer 20; Rebs: van Leeuwen 10; Asts: Huitzing 12		Pts: Khemcani 9 Rebs: Khemcani 6 Asts: Khemcani 3

Rio Olympic Arena, Rio de Janeiro
Referees: Karen Molina

11 September 2016
17:30

Report

Algeria	33–72	France
Scoring by quarter: 5–23, 8–22, 8–18, 12–9
Pts: Khemgani 12; Rebs: Khemgani 6 Asts: hemgani 5		Pts: Saint Omer Delepine 20; Rebs: Saint Omer Delepine 7 Asts: Etavard Glemp 9

Rio Olympic Arena, Rio de Janeiro
Referees: Milutin Jelenic

12 September 2016
09:30

Report

United States	65–15	Algeria
Scoring by quarter: 19–4, 12–4, 20–2, 14–5
Pts: Schneider 14; Rebs: Dunkin 10; Asts: Dunkin 6		Pts: Khemgani 8 Rebs: Khemgani 8 Asts: Abdelali 1

Rio Olympic Arena, Rio de Janeiro
Referees: Mati Quintana

9th/10th place match

13 September 2016
09:30

Report

Algeria	38–53	Argentina
Scoring by quarter: 10–14, 6–16, 8–14, 14–9
Pts: Foulani 12; Rebs: Zairi 6 Asts: Abdelau 7		Pts: Coronel 20; Rebs: Linari 11; Asts: Olmedo 8

Rio Olympic Arena, Rio de Janeiro
Referees: Jaime Oseguera

== See also ==
- Algeria at the 2016 Summer Olympics
