= Algeria at the 2012 Summer Paralympics =

- IPC code: ALG
- NPC: Algerian National Paralympic Committee

in London
- Competitors: 33 in 4 sports
- Flag bearer: Nadia Medjemedj
- Medals Ranked 26th: Gold 4 Silver 6 Bronze 9 Total 19

Summer Paralympics appearances (overview)
- 1992; 1996; 2000; 2004; 2008; 2012; 2016; 2020; 2024

Algeria competed in the 2012 Summer Paralympics in London, United Kingdom, from 29 August to 9 September 2012. 33 competitors participate at the 2012 Paralympics with 26 men and 7 women are accompanied by managers, coaches and other support staff.

== Competitors ==
Sport	Men	Women	Total
Athletics	18*	6	24
Goalball	6*	0	6
Judo	2	1	3
Powerlifting	1	0	1
Total	26	7	33

* There is one man competitor who participate in Athletics and Goalball, so number of men competitors is 26 not 27.

== Medallists ==
Medals by sport
Sport	Gold medal	Silver medal	Bronze medal	Total
Athletics	4	6	6	16
Judo	0	0	3	3
Total	4	6	9	19

Medals by day
Day	Date	1st place, gold medalist(s)	2nd place, silver medalist(s)	3rd place, bronze medalist(s)	Total
1	30 August	0	0	2	2
2	31 August	0	0	1	1
3	1 September	0	2	2	4
5	3 September	0	0	1	1
6	4 September	2	1	2	5
8	6 September	1	1	0	2
9	7 September	0	1	1	2
10	8 September	1	1	0	2
Total		4	6	9	19

Multiple medalists
Name	Sport	1st place, gold medalist(s)	2nd place, silver medalist(s)	3rd place, bronze medalist(s)	Total
Mohamed Berrahal	Athletics	1	0	1	2
Kamel Kardjena	Athletics	1	0	1	2
Samir Nouioua	Athletics	0	1	1	2
Lahouari Bahlaz	Athletics	0	0	2	2

Medal	Name	Sport	Event	Date
Gold	Abdellatif Baka	Athletics	Men's 800 m T13	8 September
Gold	Mohamed Berrahal	Athletics	Men's discus throw F51–53	6 September
Gold	Kamel Kardjena	Athletics	Men's shot put F32-33	4 September
Gold	Nassima Saifi	Athletics	Women's discus throw F57–58	4 September
Silver	Karim Betina	Athletics	Men's shot put F32-33	4 September
Silver	Hocine Gherzouli	Athletics	Men's discus throw F40	6 September
Silver	Samir Nouioua	Athletics	Men's 800 m T46	8 September
Silver	Safia Djelal	Athletics	Women's javelin throw F58	1 September
Silver	Mounia Gasmi	Athletics	Women's club throw F31/32/51	1 September
Silver	Lynda Hamri	Athletics	Women's long jump F13	7 September
Bronze	Lahouari Bahlaz	Athletics	Men's club throw F31/32/51	3 September
Bronze	Lahouari Bahlaz	Athletics	Men's discus throw F32-34	7 September
Bronze	Mounir Bakiri	Athletics	Men's shot put F32-33	4 September
Bronze	Mohamed Berrahal	Athletics	Men's 100 m T51	31 August
Bronze	Kamel Kardjena	Athletics	Men's discus throw F32-34	1 September
Bronze	Samir Nouioua	Athletics	Men's 1500 m T46	4 September
Bronze	Mouloud Noura	Judo	Men's 60 kg	30 August
Bronze	Sid Ali Lamri	Judo	Men's 66 kg	30 August
Bronze	Zoubida Bouazoug	Judo	Women's +70 kg	1 September

== Athletics ==
Abdellatif Baka won a gold medal for Algeria in the Men's 800m T13 event on September 6. The next day, Lynda Hamri won a silver for Algeria in the Women's Long Jump F13 event. Lahouari Bahlaz also won a bronze in the Men's Discus F32/33/34 event.

Key1

- WR = World record
- PR = Paralympic record
- AF = African record
- RR = Regional record
- NR = National record
- SB = Seasonal best record
- PB = Personal best record

Key2

- Note–Ranks given for preliminary rounds are within the athlete's heat only
- Q = Qualified for the next round
- q = Qualified for the next round as a fastest loser or by position without achieving the qualifying target
- N/A = Round not applicable for the event
- Bye = Athlete not required to compete in round

Men's track

Athlete	Event	Heat		Semifinal		Final	
Athlete	Event	Result	Rank	Result	Rank	Result	Rank
Abdellatif Baka	800 m T13	1:54.79 PB	2Q	—N/a		1:53.01 PR	1st place, gold medalist(s)
Abdellatif Baka	1500 m T13	3:58.72 PB	13	—N/a		did not advance	
Mohamed Berrahal	100 m T51	—N/a				22.97 RR	3rd place, bronze medalist(s)
Allel Boukhalfa	100 m T35	13.26	5Q	—N/a		13.38	5
Allel Boukhalfa	200 m T35	27.39	4Q	—N/a		26.70 RR	4
Madjid Djemai	800 m T37	—N/a				2:04.93	4
Madjid Djemai	1500 m T37	—N/a				4:16.50 PB	4
Sofiane Hamdi	100 m T37	12.01	8q	—N/a		11.80	6
Sofiane Hamdi	200 m T37	24.39	7q	—N/a		23.67	5
Khaled Hanani	800 m T37	—N/a				2:14.31	8
Khaled Hanani	1500 m T37	—N/a				4:29.23	10
Nacereddine Karfas	1500 m T13	4:08.35	17	—N/a		did not advance	
Nacereddine Karfas	5000 m T12	—N/a				15:11.41	7
Nacereddine Karfas	Marathon T12	—N/a				DNF	
Djamil Nasser	200 m T13	22.73 PB	9	—N/a		did not advance	
Djamil Nasser	400 m T13	50.45 PB	5Q	—N/a		49.88 PB	6
Samir Nouioua	800 m T46	1:55.38	2Q	—N/a		1:52.33 RR	2nd place, silver medalist(s)
Samir Nouioua	1500 m T46	3:57.27	1Q	—N/a		3:51.80 PB	3rd place, bronze medalist(s)
Zine Eddine Sekhri	400 m T13	51.92	8q	—N/a		51.16 PB	7
Zine Eddine Sekhri	800 m T13	1:58.14 PB	5Q	—N/a		Dq	

Men's field

Athlete	Event	Final	
Athlete	Event	Result	Rank
Lahouari Bahlaz	Club throw F31/32/51	36.31 PR	3rd place, bronze medalist(s)
Lahouari Bahlaz	Discus throw F32-34	22.30 WR	3rd place, bronze medalist(s)
Mounir Bakiri	Shot put F32-33	9.49	3rd place, bronze medalist(s)
Samir Belhouchat	Javelin throw F12–13	52.62 SB	8
Firas Bentria	Long jump F11	5.83 RR	6
Mohamed Berrahal	Discus throw F51–53	12.37 WR	1st place, gold medalist(s)
Karim Betina	Club throw F31/32/51	29.75 SB	8
Karim Betina	Discus throw F32-34	NM	
Karim Betina	Shot put F32-33	10.37	2nd place, silver medalist(s)
Hocine Gherzouli	Discus throw F40	30.89 PB	10
Hocine Gherzouli	Shot put F40	12.91 RR	2nd place, silver medalist(s)
Kamel Kardjena	Discus throw F32-34	25.50	14
Kamel Kardjena	Javelin throw F33-34	26.40 WR	3rd place, bronze medalist(s)
Kamel Kardjena	Shot put F32-33	12.14 PR	1st place, gold medalist(s)

Women's track

Athlete	Event	Heat		Semifinal		Final	
Athlete	Event	Result	Rank	Result	Rank	Result	Rank
Lynda Hamri	100 m T13	13.60 SB	10	—N/a		did not advance	

Women's field

Athlete	Event	Final	
Athlete	Event	Result	Rank
Safia Djelal	Javelin throw F58	28.87 PB	2nd place, silver medalist(s)
Safia Djelal	Shot put F57–58	10.52 PB	4
Mounia Gasmi	Club throw F31/32/51	1052 pts PB	2nd place, silver medalist(s)
Mounia Gasmi	Shot put F32-34	5.56	7
Lynda Hamri	Long jump F13	5.31 PB	2nd place, silver medalist(s)
Nadia Medjemedj	Discus throw F57–58	24.80 SB	4
Nadia Medjemedj	Shot put F57–58	NM	
Fatiha Mehdi	Discus throw F40	13.64	6
Fatiha Mehdi	Shot put F40	6.49	6
Nassima Saifi	Discus throw F57–58	40.34 PR	1st place, gold medalist(s)
Nassima Saifi	Shot put F57–58	9.77	7

== Goalball ==
=== Men's tournament ===
Roster

- Firas Bentria
- Abdelhalim Larbi
- Imad Eddine Godmane
- Mohamed Ouali
- Mohamed Mokrane
- Ishak Boutaleb

Group B

Team	Pld	W	D	L	GF	GA	GD	Pts	Qualification
Iran	5	4	0	1	32	20	+12	12	Quarterfinals
China	5	3	1	1	20	14	+6	10	Quarterfinals
Belgium	5	3	1	1	19	16	+3	10	Quarterfinals
Algeria	5	2	0	3	18	17	+1	6	Quarterfinals
South Korea	5	1	0	4	18	28	−10	3	Eliminated
Canada	5	1	0	4	16	28	−12	3	Eliminated

Source: "London 2012 Paralympic Games - Goalball results" (PDF). Paralympic.org. 2012-10-03 – via Goalball.sport.

30 August 2012; 15:00	South Korea	4 – 3	Algeria	Copper Box, London; Referees: Kimberly Anderson (USA), Carla Da Matta (BRA)
30 August 2012; 15:00	Hong 4	Report	Mokrane 2 Larbi 1	Copper Box, London; Referees: Kimberly Anderson (USA), Carla Da Matta (BRA)

31 August 2012; 21:00	Algeria	5 – 2	Belgium	Copper Box, London; Referees: Ali Aldarsony (KSA), Juha Vuokila (FIN)
31 August 2012; 21:00	Mokrane 3 Larbi 2	Report	de Rick 1 Bihi 1	Copper Box, London; Referees: Ali Aldarsony (KSA), Juha Vuokila (FIN)

1 September 2012; 19:45	Algeria	0 – 1	China	Copper Box, London; Referees: Dina Murdie (GBR), Ali Aldarsony (KSA)
1 September 2012; 19:45		Report	Yao 1	Copper Box, London; Referees: Dina Murdie (GBR), Ali Aldarsony (KSA)

2 September 2012; 16:15	Canada	6 – 8	Algeria	Copper Box, London; Referees: Vilma Venckutonyte (LTU), Yasser Omar (EGY)
2 September 2012; 16:15	Caron 4 Gaulin 2	Report	Mokrane 8	Copper Box, London; Referees: Vilma Venckutonyte (LTU), Yasser Omar (EGY)

3 September 2012; 10:15	Iran	4 – 2	Algeria	Copper Box, London; Referees: Dina Murdie (GBR), Tony Connolly (USA)
3 September 2012; 10:15	Sayahi 2 Jafari 1 Shirdel 1	Report	Mokrane 2	Copper Box, London; Referees: Dina Murdie (GBR), Tony Connolly (USA)

Quarter-final

5 September 2012; 15:45	Turkey	3 – 1	Algeria	Copper Box, London; Referees: Juha Vuokila (FIN), Dawna Christy (CAN)
5 September 2012; 15:45	Karakaya 3	Report	Mokrane 1	Copper Box, London; Referees: Juha Vuokila (FIN), Dawna Christy (CAN)

== Judo ==
Men

Athlete	Event	Round of 16	Quarterfinals	Semifinals	First repechage round	Repechage semifinals	Final	
Athlete	Event	Opposition Result	Opposition Result	Opposition Result	Opposition Result	Opposition Result	Opposition Result	Rank
Sid Ali Lamri	Men's -66 kg	—N/a	Hirose (JPN); L 0001-001	Did not advance	Garcia del Valle (ESP); W 100-000	Mustafayev (AZE); W 1021-0002	Did not advance	3rd place, bronze medalist(s)
Mouloud Noura	Men's -60 kg	Aajim (MGL); W 1001-0001	Quilter (GBR); W 1021-0000	Li (CHN); L 000-100	BYE	Lee (KOR); W 110-001	Did not advance	3rd place, bronze medalist(s)
Zoubida Bouazoug	Women's +70 kg	—N/a	Yuan (CHN); L 000-020	Did not advance	Davis (USA); W 020-000	Manzuoli (FRA); W 023-0002	Did not advance	3rd place, bronze medalist(s)

== Powerlifting ==
Athlete	Event	Total lifted	Rank
Hamza Bouali	Men's -100 kg	DNS	

== See also ==
- Algeria at the 2012 Summer Olympics
- Algeria at the Paralympics
