= Athletics at the 2004 Summer Paralympics – Men's 800 metres T46 =

Men's 800m T46 at the XII Paralympic Games
- Venue: Athens Olympic Stadium
- Dates: 24–25 September 2004
- Competitors: 13 from 11 nations
- Winning time: 1:57.89

Medalists
1st place, gold medalist(s)		Danny Crates	Great Britain
2nd place, silver medalist(s)		Samir Nouioua	Algeria
3rd place, bronze medalist(s)		Jean Nkundabera	Rwanda

The Men's 800m race for class T46 amputee athletes at the 2004 Summer Paralympics were held in the Athens Olympic Stadium on 24 & 25 September. The event consisted of 2 heats and a final, and was won by Danny Crates, representing Great Britain.

== 1st round ==
Qualified for next round

Heat 1

24 Sept. 2004, 09:00

Rank	Athlete	Time	Notes
1	Danny Crates (GBR)	1:58.48	Q
2	Samir Nouioua (ALG)	1:58.54	Q
3	José Monteiro (POR)	1:58.88	Q
4	Mohamed Aissaoui (ALG)	1:59.24	q
5	Jean de Dieu Nkundabera (RWA)	1:59.30	q
6	Jose Saiendo (ANG)	2:03.87	
	Girraj Girraj (IND)	DNF	

Heat 2

24 Sept. 2004, 09:08

Rank	Athlete	Time	Notes
1	Emmanuel Lacroix (FRA)	2:02.95	Q
2	Farid Sehili (ALG)	2:03.89	Q
3	Oumar Basakoulba Kone (CIV)	2:04.12	Q
4	Willbert Costantino (TAN)	2:09.41	
	Aleksandr Polishuk (AZE)	DNF	
	Abdelghani Gtaib (MAR)	DNF	

== Final round ==
25 Sept. 2004, 20:45

Rank	Athlete	Time	Notes
1st place, gold medalist(s)	Danny Crates (GBR)	1:57.89	
2nd place, silver medalist(s)	Samir Nouioua (ALG)	1:58.71	
3rd place, bronze medalist(s)	Jean de Dieu Nkundabera (RWA)	1:58.95	
4	Emmanuel Lacroix (FRA)	1:59.07	
5	Farid Sehili (ALG)	1:59.66	
6	Oumar Basakoulba Kone (CIV)	1:59.78	
7	Mohamed Aissaoui (ALG)	1:59.95	
8	José Monteiro (POR)	2:00.39	
