= Athletics at the 2004 Summer Paralympics – Men's 5000 metres T46 =

Men's 5,000m T46 at the XII Paralympic Games
- Venue: Athens Olympic Stadium
- Dates: 27 September 2004
- Competitors: 17 from 13 nations
- Winning time: 14:54.49

Medalists
1st place, gold medalist(s)		Samir Nouioua	Algeria
2nd place, silver medalist(s)		Javier Conde	Spain
3rd place, bronze medalist(s)		Ozivam Bonfim	Brazil

The Men's 5000m race for class T46 amputee athletes at the 2004 Summer Paralympics was a single race held in the Athens Olympic Stadium. It was won by Samir Nouioua, representing Algeria.

== Final round ==
27 Sept. 2004, 21:05

Rank	Athlete	Time	Notes
1st place, gold medalist(s)	Samir Nouioua (ALG)	14:54.49	
2nd place, silver medalist(s)	Javier Conde (ESP)	15:00.31	
3rd place, bronze medalist(s)	Ozivam Bonfim (BRA)	15:02.09	
4	Moises Vicente (BRA)	15:10.65	
5	Mark Brown (GBR)	15:21.56	
6	Christoph Sommer (SUI)	15:24.99	
7	Mohamed Aissaoui (ALG)	15:33.73	
8	Abdelghani Gtaib (MAR)	15:34.02	
9	Stephen W. Musyoki (KEN)	15:35.44	
10	Pedro Meza (MEX)	15:37.84	WR
11	Jose Saiendo (ANG)	15:48.34	
12	Jose Castilla (ESP)	15:52.02	
13	Naohiro Ninomiya (JPN)	15:57.16	
14	Emmanuel Lacroix (FRA)	15:59.95	
15	Wei Yuan Bang (CHN)	16:02.38	
16	Zeljko Celikovic (SCG)	16:25.72	
17	Farid Sehili (ALG)	17:06.40	
