= Algeria at the 1992 Summer Paralympics =

- IPC code: ALG
- NPC: Algerian National Paralympic Committee

in Barcelona
- Competitors: 8 in 2 sports
- Medals Ranked 56th: Gold 0 Silver 0 Bronze 0 Total 0

Summer Paralympics appearances (overview)
- 1992; 1996; 2000; 2004; 2008; 2012; 2016; 2020; 2024

Athletes from the Algeria competed at the 1992 Summer Paralympics in Barcelona, Spain. It's the first participation of Algeria in the games.

== Competitors ==
Algeria had an 8-member large delegation in Barcelona, all of whom were men. They would not send women for the first time until the 2000 Games. The team included Abdelkrim Yousei.

Sport	Men	Women	Total
Athletics	2	-	2
Goalball	6	-	6
Total	8	-	8

== Results by event ==
=== Athletics ===
Abdelkrim participated in heat 4 of the Men's 5000 m TW3-4, finishing last with a time of 14:02.06. He had a DNF in the Men's Marathon TW3-4.

Men

Athlete	Event	Semifinal			Final		Rank
Athlete	Event	Heat	Time	Rank	Time	Rank	Rank
Abdelkrim Yousei	Men's 100 m TW4	3	19.39	10	did not advance		38
Abdelkrim Yousei	Men's 5000 m TW3-4	4	14:02.06	12	did not advance		42
Abdelkrim Yousei	Men's marathon TW3-4	did not start, Q			DNF		-
Bachir Zergoune	Men's 800 m TS4	1	2:03.29	3Q	2:04.61	7	7
Bachir Zergoune	Men's 1500 m TS4	did not start, Q			4:13.56	7	7
Bachir Zergoune	Men's 5000 m TS4	did not start, Q			16:01.82	6	6

=== Goalball ===
Men

Squad list	Preliminary round		2nd round	Semifinal	Final	Rank
Squad list	Group A	Rank	2nd round	Semifinal	Final	Rank
Said Benfissa; Houari Fassi; Nacereddine Matelou; Toufik Meheloul; Mustapha Mehenni; Kheir Souig		12	did not advance			

== See also ==
- Algeria at the Paralympics
- Algeria at the 1992 Summer Olympics
