= Athletics at the 2016 Summer Paralympics – Men's shot put F32 =

Athletics at the 2016 Summer Paralympics – Men's shot put F32 refers to shot put competition at the 2016 Summer Paralympics in the F32 disability format. The gold metal was won by Greek athlete Athanasios Konstantinidis.

== Results ==
=== F32 ===
Rank	Athlete	Nationality	1	2	3	4	5	6	Best	Notes
1st place, gold medalist(s)	Athanasios Konstantinidis	Greece	9.83	10.09	x	9.40	10.15	10.39	10.39	WR PR ER
2nd place, silver medalist(s)	Lahouari Bahlaz	Algeria	x	x	8.81	9.40	x	x	9.40	
3rd place, bronze medalist(s)	Dimitrios Zisidis	Greece	8.66	8.80	9.24	x	x	7.67	9.24	PB
4	Maciej Sochal	Poland	7.64	x	7.59	7.42	8.60	7.47	8.60	
5	Younes Seifipour	Iran	x	8.18	8.40	7.56	7.33	x	8.40	
6	Abderrahim Missouni	Algeria	8.17	7.61	8.06	7.80	8.02	7.35	8.17	
7	Mohammad Nasser	Kuwait	7.17	7.23	7.67	x	7.13	x	7.67	
8	Youssef Ouaddali	Morocco	x	'7.56	x	x	x	6.99	7.56	
9	Karim Betina	Algeria	x	7.27	x	-	-	-	7.27	
10	Nikolaos Gonios	Greece	x	7.00	x	-	-	-	7.00	
-	Mohammed Al Mashaykhi	Oman	x	x	x	-	-	-	NM	
-	Abdennacer Feidi	Tunisia	x	x	x	-	-	-	NM	
