= Samira Guerioua =

Algerian para powerlifter

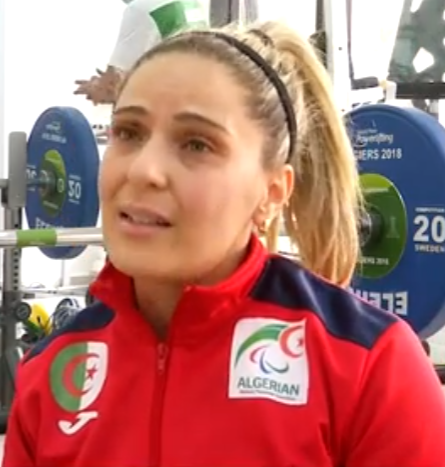
- In a 2021 interview

Personal information
- Native name: سميرة قريوة

Sport
- Country: Algeria
- Sport: Para powerlifting
Medal record
Fazza World Para Powerlifting World Cup
Gold medal – first place	2023 Cairo	Women's 45kg
Silver medal – second place	2017 Eger	Women's 45kg
Silver medal – second place	2019 Dubai	Women's 45kg

Samira Guerioua (Arabic: سميرة قريوة; born 1982 or 1983) is an Algerian para powerlifter. She represented Algeria at the 2016, 2020, and 2024 Summer Paralympics.

== Career ==
Guerioua has competed in powerlifting since 2010.

At the 2015 Paralympic ranking competition in Brazzaville, Guerioua came third in the women's up to 45kg category, lifting 82 kg. She came seventh in the 2015 European Open Championships. Guerioua competed at the 2016 Summer Paralympics, where she reached the final round in the Women's 45 kg event, finishing in sixth place.

In 2017, Guerioua came second in the Women's 45kg category at the Fazza World Para Powerlifting World Cup in Eger, Hungary. She came sixth in the final of the Mexico City 2017 World Para Powerlifting Championships.

In 2019, at the Fazza World Para Powerlifting World Cup in Dubai, Guerioua again took second place in Women's 45kg, lifting 78 kg. At the 2020 Summer Paralympics, she came fourth in the Women's 45kg final. At the 2021 World Para Powerlifting Championships in Tbilisi, she came fifth in her event.

In 2023, Guerioua took first place in the Women's 45kg event at the Fazza World Para Powerlifting World Cup in Cairo, lifting 93 kg. The win earned her a spot in the 2024 Paralympics, where she came eighth in her event.
