= Athletics at the 2004 Summer Paralympics – Men's 1500 metres T46 =

Men's 1,500m T46 at the XII Paralympic Games
- Venue: Athens Olympic Stadium
- Dates: 20 September 2004
- Competitors: 13 from 10 nations
- Winning time: 3:58.75

Medalists
1st place, gold medalist(s)		Samir Nouioua	Algeria
2nd place, silver medalist(s)		Abdelghani Gtaib	Morocco
3rd place, bronze medalist(s)		Mohamed Aissaoui	Algeria

The Men's 1,500m race for class T46 amputee athletes at the 2004 Summer Paralympics was a single race held in the Athens Olympic Stadium on 20 September. It was won by Samir Nouioua, representing Algeria.

== Final round ==
20 Sept. 2004, 09:30

Rank	Athlete	Time	Notes
1st place, gold medalist(s)	Samir Nouioua (ALG)	3:58.75	
2nd place, silver medalist(s)	Abdelghani Gtaib (MAR)	4:01.77	
3rd place, bronze medalist(s)	Mohamed Aissaoui (ALG)	4:02.06	
4	Farid Sehili (ALG)	4:04.45	
5	Naohiro Ninomiya (JPN)	4:04.49	
6	Ozivam Bonfim (BRA)	4:05.29	
7	Wei Yuan Bang (CHN)	4:07.63	
8	Pedro Meza (MEX)	4:08.26	
9	Christoph Sommer (SUI)	4:08.81	
10	Moises Vicente (BRA)	4:13.53	
11	Stephen W. Musyoki (KEN)	4:14.42	
12	Emmanuel Lacroix (FRA)	4:14.71	
13	Zeljko Celikovic (SCG)	4:22.02	
