= Faouzi Bellele =

Algerian Paralympic athlete

Medal record

Paralympic athletics

Representing Algeria

Paralympic Games
| Silver medal – second place | 1996 Atlanta | Men's 5000 m T34-37 |
| Bronze medal – third place | 1996 Atlanta | Men's 1500 m T34-37 |
| Bronze medal – third place | 1996 Atlanta | Men's 800 m T34-36 |

Faouzi Bellele is a male Algerian Paralympic Athlete who participated in the 1996 Paralympics and won three medals: two bronze, and one silver.
