= Danny Crates =

British Paralympic athlete

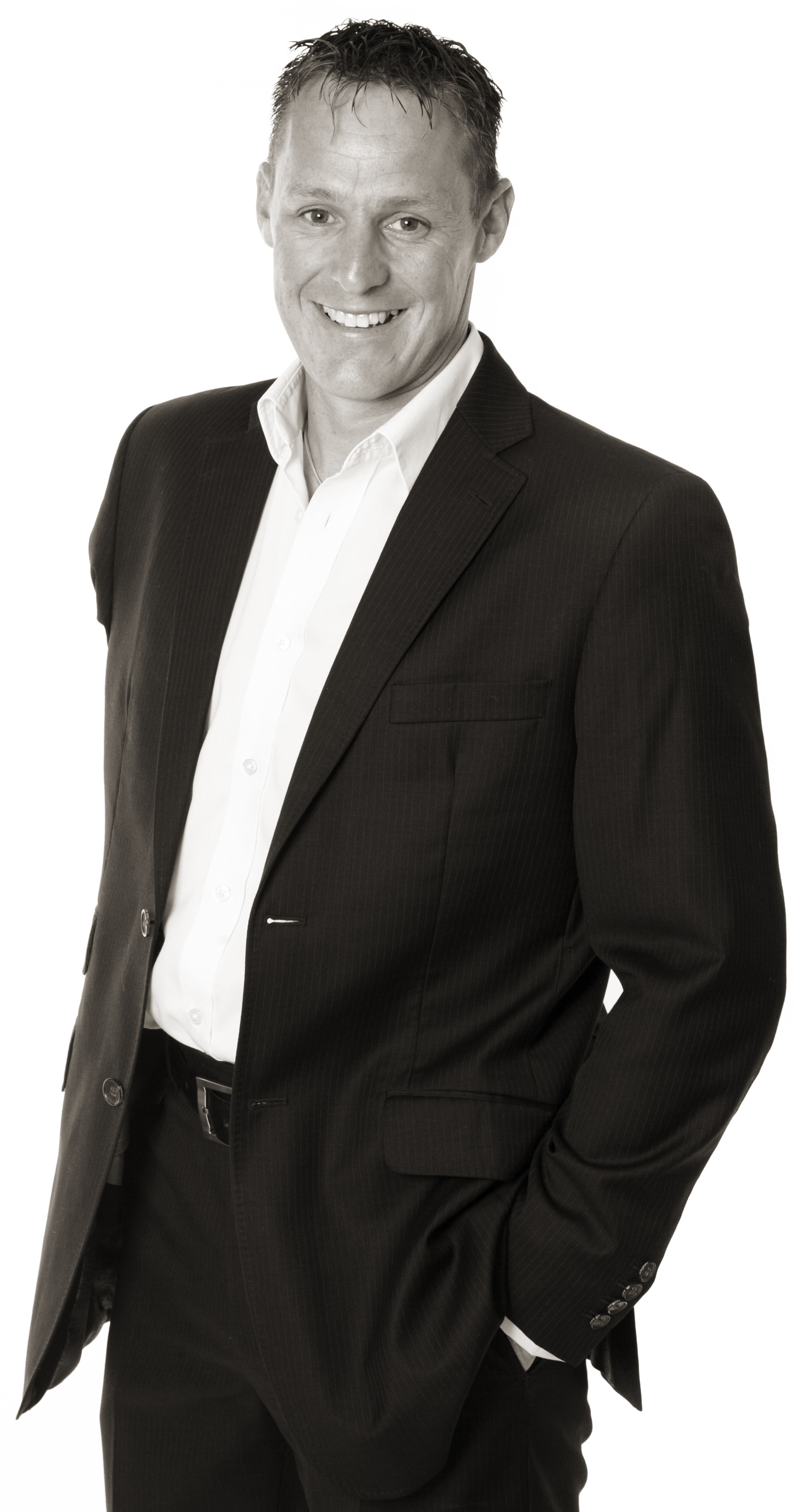
- Crates – Paralympic Gold Medallist and former world record holder, now a motivational speaker

Personal information
- Nationality: United Kingdom
- Born: 9 February 1973 (age 53) Orsett, Essex, England
- Other interests: Rugby, Scuba Diving, Resilience Speaker
- Website: www.dannycrates.co.uk

Sport
- Country: Great Britain
- Sport: Athletics
- Disability class: T46
- Events: 400 metres, 800 metres
- Coached by: Ayo Falola
- Retired: 25 July 2009
Medal record
Representing United Kingdom
Men's athletics
Paralympic Games
Gold medal – first place	2004 Athens	800 metres
Bronze medal – third place	2000 Sydney	400 metres
IPC World Championships
Gold medal – first place	2006	800 metres
Silver medal – second place	1998	4x400 metres
IPC European Championships
Gold medal – first place	2001	400 metres
Gold medal – first place	2003	800 metres
Gold medal – first place	2005	800 metres
World Indoor Championships
Gold medal – first place	2003	800 metres
Paralympic World Cup
Gold medal – first place	2006	800 metres
Gold medal – first place	2007	800 metres
Silver medal – second place	2005	800 metres
- Updated on 1 May 2015

Daniel Brian Crates (born 9 February 1973) is a British former athlete, who specialised in 800m. He is a former Paralympic world record holder in this event, and won gold medals in a number of international competitions, including the Paralympic Games, European Championships and World Championships. He also plays competitive rugby and is a qualified diving instructor.

Crates was born in Orsett, Essex. He took up athletics after losing his right arm in a car accident while in Australia in 1994. He competed in T46 (arm amputee) events and represented Britain at the 2000 Summer Paralympics in Sydney – winning the bronze medal in the 400m sprint, and at the 2004 Summer Paralympics in Athens where he won gold in the 800m.

After Sydney, Crates switched from the 400m to the 800m, in which he holds the world record with a time of 1:53.27 set in 2004 at the AAA Championships.

Crates also won gold in the 800m race at the European Championships in 2003, and again in 2005. He won gold in the same category at the World Indoor Championships in 2003. He had previously won gold running 400m at the European Championships in 2001. He won gold in the 800m race at the inaugural Paralympic World Cup in Manchester in 2004, but did not compete to retain his title in 2008.

He also plays competitive rugby within teams of non-amputee players.

Crates carried the Olympic torch in London in 2008 and was selected as flag bearer for the opening ceremony in the 2008 Summer Paralympics in Beijing.

Crates retired from athletics on 25 July 2009, after competing at the London Grand Prix at Crystal Palace. He came in third place in his last race and during his career Crates won 11 gold and 1 bronze medals.

He was part of the UK Channel 4 commentary team for the London 2012 Paralympics. His autobiography was published in 2012 and is called Danny Boy. Also on Channel 4 in 2017 he was part of the presenting team at the 2017 BDO World Darts Championship.

Since retiring from athletics, Danny Crates has become a motivational speaker and has made many TV appearances. He is a regular guest reporter on BBC's Food: Truth or Scare.

Crates took part in the 2015 series of Celebrity MasterChef.

Crates was part of the Channel 4 commentary team at the Paris 2024 Paralympic Games.
