= Messaoud Nine =

Algerian Paralympic judo

Medal record

Paralympic judo

Representing Algeria

Paralympic Games
Gold medal – first place	2004 Athens	Men's Middleweight 90kg

Messaoud Nine is a male Algerian Paralympic judoka who participated in the 2004 Paralympics, winning one gold medal, and also participated in the 2008 Paralympics, where he competed in the bronze medal match.
