= Athletics at the 2024 Summer Paralympics – Men's club throw =

Event at the 2024 Summer Paralympics

The Men's club throw athletics events for the 2024 Summer Paralympics took place at the Stade de France on August 31 and September 4, 2024. A total of 2 events were contested in this discipline.

== Medal summary ==
The following is a summary of the medals awarded across all men's club throw events.

Classification	Gold		Silver		Bronze	
F32	Aleksei Churkin; Neutral Paralympic Athletes	40.33 AR	Athanasios Konstantinidis; Greece	38.65	Ahmed Mehideb; Algeria	38.61
F51	Dharambir Nain; India	34.92	Pranav Soorma; India	34.59	Zeljko Dimitrijevic; Serbia	34.18

== Results ==
=== F32 ===
Men's Club throw F32 at the XVII Paralympic Games
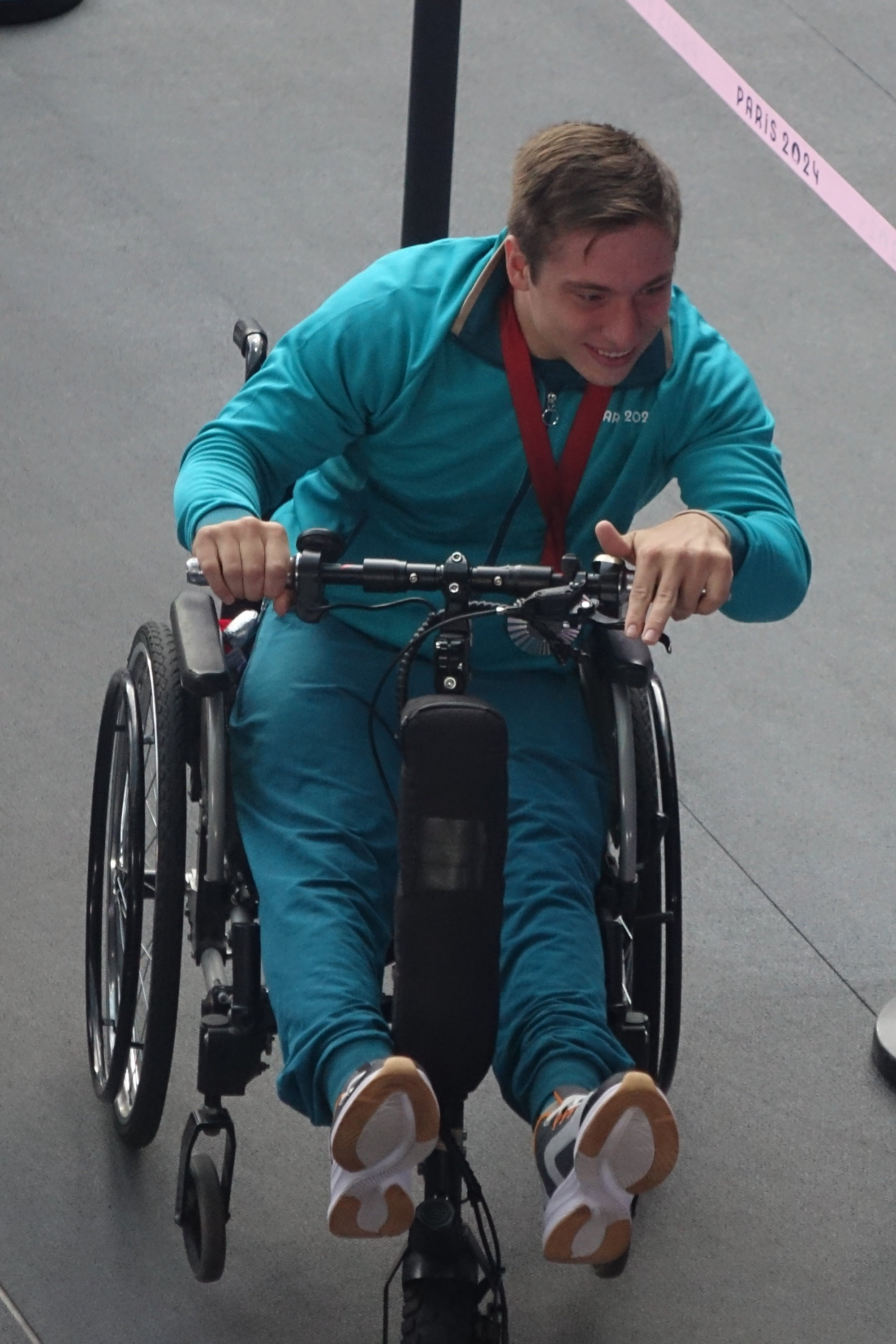
- Aleksei Churkin, gold medal winner in the Men's F32 club throw
- Venue: Stade de France
- Dates: 1 September 2024
- Competitors: 9 from 5 nations

Medalists
1st place, gold medalist(s)		Aleksei Churkin	Neutral Paralympic Athletes
2nd place, silver medalist(s)		Athanasios Konstantinidis	Greece
3rd place, bronze medalist(s)		Ahmed Mehideb	Algeria

The Men's club throw F32 event at the 2024 Summer Paralympics in Paris, took place on 30 August 2024. The event was also open to F31 athletes.

=== Records ===
Prior to the competition, the existing records were as follows:

F31 Records

World Record	Evgenii Demin (RUS)	46.66m	(Russia) Cheboksary	12 August 2023
Paralympic Record	No Record Set			

F32 Records

World Record	Bo Qing (CHN)	46.66m	(France) Paris	10 July 2023
Paralympic Record	Liu Li (CHN)	45.39m	(Japan) Tokyo	28 August 2021

=== Results ===
==== Final ====
The final in this classification took place on 1 September 2024:

Rank	Athlete	Nationality	Class	1	2	3	4	5	6	Best	Notes
1st place, gold medalist(s)	Aleksei Churkin	Neutral Paralympic Athletes	F32	40.30	39.42	38.65	38.46	37.02	x	40.30	AR
2nd place, silver medalist(s)	Athanasios Konstantinidis	Greece	F32	36.85	36.88	35.78	35.14	37.62	38.65	38.65	PB
3rd place, bronze medalist(s)	Ahmed Mehideb	Algeria	F32	37.75	38.61	37.78	x	37.08	36.49	38.61	
4	Walid Ferhah	Algeria	F32	37.90	37.12	36.63	37.48	37.99	37.12	37.99	
5	Lazaros Stefanidis	Greece	F32	x	x	x	36.38	x	36.87	36.87	
6	Frantisek Serbus	Czech Republic	F32	30.99	32.52	33.49	32.80	32.28	33.48	33.49	
7	Wassim Salhi	Turkey	F32	33.24	31.91	32.55	x	31.05	32.15	33.24	
8	Abdelhak Missouni	Algeria	F32	x	x	x	32.91	x	31.83	32.91	
9	Dimitrios Zisidis	Greece	F32	23.28	23.52	x	23.28	23.90	23.17	23.90	

=== F51 ===
Men's Club throw F32 at the XVII Paralympic Games
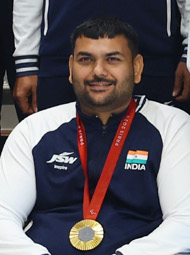
- Dharambir Nain
- Venue: Stade de France
- Dates: 5 September 2024
- Competitors: 10 from 6 nations

Medalists
1st place, gold medalist(s)		Dharambir	India
2nd place, silver medalist(s)		Pranav Soorma	India
3rd place, bronze medalist(s)		Zeljko Dimitrijevic	Serbia

The Men's club throw F51 event at the 2024 Summer Paralympics in Paris, took place on 5 September 2024.

=== Records ===
Prior to the competition, the existing records were as follows:

World Record	Musa Taimazov (RUS)	36.22m	(Russia) Cheboksary	12 August 2023
Paralympic Record	Musa Taimazov (RPC)	35.42m	(Japan) Tokyo	1 September 2021

=== Results ===
==== Final ====
The final in this classification took place on 1 September 2024:

Rank	Athlete	Nationality	Class	1	2	3	4	5	6	Best	Notes
1st place, gold medalist(s)	Dharambir	India	F51	x	x	x	x	34.92	31.59	34.92	AR
2nd place, silver medalist(s)	Pranav Soorma	India	F51	34.59	34.19	x	34.50	33.90	33.70	34.59	
3rd place, bronze medalist(s)	Zeljko Dimitrijevic	Serbia	F51	32.70	34.18	32.91	33.70	32.46	31.80	34.18	
4	Filip Graovac	Serbia	F51	31.39	32.09	32.21	31.18	31.27	31.40	32.21	
5	Mario Santana Ramos Hernandez	Mexico	F51	29.81	31.76	x	x	x	29.27	31.76	
6	Uladzislau Hyrb	Neutral Paralympic Athletes	F51	28.09	27.75	x	30.69	30.78	31.69	31.69	
7	Aleksandar Radisic	Serbia	F51	x	31.32	31.32	x	31.08	30.96	31.32	
8	Marian Kureja	Slovenia	F51	x	x	29.30	29.26	29.46	x	29.30	
9	Michal Enge	Czech Republic	F51	27.04	27.37	27.65	27.34	28.32	27.23	28.32	
10	Amit Kumar Kumar	India	F51	x	21.49	x	23.96	x	x	23.96	YC R34.6b

Notes:Yellow Card –Amit Kumar Kumar– WPA Rule 34.6b (All substances used on the hands and on the implements shall be easily removable from the implement using a wet cloth and shall not leave any residue.)
