= Youcef Boudjeltia =

Algerian Paralympic athlete

Medal record

Paralympic athletics

Representing Algeria

Paralympic Games
Silver medal – second place	1996 Atlanta	Men's 400m T12

Youcef Boudjeltia is a male Algerian Paralympic Athlete who participated in the 1996 Paralympics and won one silver medal.
