= Judo at the 2020 Summer Paralympics – Women's 52 kg =

Judo – Women's 52 kg at the XVI Paralympic Games
- Venue: Nippon Budokan
- Date: 27 August 2021
- Competitors: 9 from 9 nations

Medalists
| 1st place, gold medalist(s) | | Cherine Abdellaoui | Algeria |
| 2nd place, silver medalist(s) | | Priscilla Gagné | Canada |
| 3rd place, bronze medalist(s) | | Alesia Stepaniuk | RPC |
| 3rd place, bronze medalist(s) | | Nataliya Nikolaychyk | Ukraine |

The women's 52 kg judo competition at the 2020 Summer Paralympics was held on 27 August 2021 at the Nippon Budokan.

== Results ==
=== Bracket ===
Round of 16
Methini Wongchomphu (THA) | 00
Nataliya Nikolaychyk (UKR) | 10

Quarterfinals
Priscilla Gagné (CAN) | 01
Alesia Stepaniuk (RPC) | 00
Ramona Brussig (GER) | 10
Karla Cardoso (BRA) | 00
Cherine Abdellaoui (ALG) | 10
Nataliya Nikolaychyk (UKR) | 00
Basti Safarova (AZE) | 00
Yui Fujiwara (JPN) | 10

Semifinals
Priscilla Gagné (CAN) | 11
Ramona Brussig (GER) | 00
Cherine Abdellaoui (ALG) | 10
Yui Fujiwara (JPN) | 00

Final
Priscilla Gagné (CAN) | 00
Cherine Abdellaoui (ALG) | 10

=== Repechage ===
Repechage
Alesia Stepaniuk (RPC) | 11
Karla Cardoso (BRA) | 00

Bronze medal
Alesia Stepaniuk (RPC) | 10
Yui Fujiwara (JPN) | 00

Repechage
Nataliya Nikolaychyk (UKR) | 10
Basti Safarova (AZE) | 00

Bronze medal
Nataliya Nikolaychyk (UKR) | 11
Ramona Brussig (GER) | 00
