= Judo at the 2004 Summer Paralympics – Men's 90 kg =

Judo competition

Judo - Men's up to 90 kg at the XII Paralympic Games
- Paralympic Judo
- Venue: Ano Liossia Olympic Hall
- Dates: 20 September 2004
- Competitors: 12 from 12 nations

Medalists
| 1st place, gold medalist(s) | | Messaoud Nine | Algeria |
| 2nd place, silver medalist(s) | | Oleg Kretsul | Russia |
| 3rd place, bronze medalist(s) | | Jonas Stoškus | Lithuania |
| 3rd place, bronze medalist(s) | | Raul Fernández | Spain |

The Men's up to 90 kg judo competition at the 2004 Summer Paralympics was held on 20 September at the Ano Liossia Olympic Hall.

The tournament bracket consisted of a single-elimination contest culminating in a gold medal match. There was also a repechage to determine the winners of the two bronze medals. Each judoka who had lost to a semifinalist competed in the repechage. The two judokas who lost in the semifinals faced the winner of the opposite half of the bracket's repechage in bronze medal bouts.

The event was won by Messaoud Nine, representing Algeria.

== Results ==
The four digits represent scores of ippon, waza-ari, yuko and koka (which was still used at the time). A letter indicates a penalty of shido, chui, keikoku or hansoku make, which (at the time) also registered a score of koka, yuko, waza-ari or ippon, respectively, to the opponent. Penalties are escalated, thus 2 shido = chui, 3 shido = keikoku, 4 shido = hansoku make, save that a penalty of hansoku make direct results in exclusion from the remainder of the competition, while if it results from escalation it does not.

=== Competition bracket ===
Round of 16
Divino Dinato (BRA) | 0000
Park Jung Min (KOR) | 1000
Anthony Clarke (AUS) | 1000
Isao Cruz Alonso (CUB) | 0000
Eiji Miyauchi (JPN) | 0200C
Seyed Amir Mirhassan Nattaj (IRI) | 0022K
Jonas Stoškus (LTU) | 0011S
Messaoud Nine (ALG) | 0211S

Quarterfinals
Raul Fernández (ESP) | 0000S
Park Jung Min (KOR) | 1002
Anthony Clarke (AUS) | 0000
Oleg Kretsul (RUS) | 1000
Olivier Cugnon (FRA) | 1011S
Eiji Miyauchi (JPN) | 0001S
Scott Jones (USA) | 0000
Messaoud Nine (ALG) | 1000

Semifinals
Park Jung Min (KOR) | 0000
Oleg Kretsul (RUS) | 1010
Olivier Cugnon (FRA)
Messaoud Nine (ALG) | KG

Final
Oleg Kretsul (RUS) | 0001
Messaoud Nine (ALG) | 0120S

KG: Kiken-gachi = win by withdrawal

=== Repechage ===
First round
Divino Dinato (BRA) | 0000
Raul Fernández (ESP) | 1000
Jonas Stoškus (LTU) | 1001
Scott Jones (USA) | 0000

Second round
Raul Fernández (ESP) | 1000
Anthony Clarke (AUS) | 0000
Eiji Miyauchi (JPN) | 0001
Jonas Stoškus (LTU) | 1000S

Bronze medal matches
Raul Fernández (ESP) | FG
Olivier Cugnon (FRA)
Jonas Stoškus (LTU) | 0011C
Park Jung Min (KOR) | 0010C

FG: Fusen-gachi = win by default
