= Tim Willis =

Paralympic athlete and lawyer

Personal information
- Nationality: United States
- Born: Henry T. Willis Georgia, United States

Sport
- Sport: Track and field
- Disability class: T11
- Events: 1500 m, 5000 m, 10,000 m

Tim Willis (born Henry T. Willis), is an American blind Paralympic athlete, attorney, and disability rights advocate.

== Early life and education ==
Willis grew up in Georgia and lost his sight by age 10 due to Coats' disease. He became the first fully blind athlete to compete in NCAA Division I cross-country running at Georgia Southern University, graduating in 1994 with a Bachelor of Science in Political science and a minor in Criminal justice.

He earned a Juris Doctor from Mercer University School of Law in 2000, completed a Management Concepts Certificate – Pass-through Track – in 2013, and has been a member of the State Bar of Georgia since 2000.

== Paralympic career ==
Willis represented the United States in three Paralympic Games, winning five medals: a silver (10,000 m) and three bronzes (1,500 m, 5,000 m, 4×400 m relay) at the Atlanta 1996 Games, and a bronze (10,000 m) at the Sydney 2000 Games. He also earned gold (10,000 m), silver (5,000 m), and bronze (1,500 m) at the 1994 World Championships in Berlin.

Willis held the T11 10,000 m world record from 1995 to 2002, and was the first male athlete with a disability to be named the USOPC’s Athlete of the Month in 1995.

In 1994, Willis was selected to run with President Bill Clinton before the Lillehammer Games and carried the Olympic torch in Oslo and Stone Mountain in 1994 and 1996 respectively.

At the 1998 World Championships in Madrid, he won two silver medals. At the 2000 Paralympics, he earned a bronze in the 10,000 m and received news that he had passed the Georgia Bar Exam.

== Legal and professional career ==
After retiring from athletics, Willis passed the Georgia Bar and launched the Law Office of Tim Willis, focusing on:

- Disability law: ADA compliance, accessibility, and civil rights for individuals with disabilities.
- Personal injury: Representation in injury and liability cases.
- Estate planning: Wills, trusts, and asset protection.

From 2008–2014, he worked with the USOPC, managing federal grant programs, leading compliance training, and supporting veteran initiatives. He also served on the **Team Selection Procedures Working Committee**, reviewing and approving hundreds of selection procedures for the Olympic, Paralympic, Pan American, Para Pan, and Youth Olympic Games.

Since 2014, he has worked as a consultant advising nonprofits and businesses on ADA policy and federal grant compliance. He also represents clients in personal injury cases and oversees wills and estates matters in his private practice based in Chattanooga, Tennessee.

== Advocacy and public speaking ==
Willis has held several leadership and advisory roles:

- President, Touch the Future, Inc. (2006–2013)
- Board Member, BlazeSports America (2007–2016)
- Athlete Ombudsman, 2008 U.S. Paralympic Team
- Attorney & Conference Committee Member, Touch the Future (2000–2013)
- Appointee, Georgia Statewide Rehabilitation Council (1998–2007)
- Member, USOPC Athletic Technical Committee (1999–2002)
- Advisory Board, Youth Leadership Forum (2000–2002)

He has delivered keynotes and talks at:

- Georgia Southern University (Commencement, Fall 2003)
- Mercer University School of Law – ADA & the Internet
- Georgia ADA Exchange – Transit and disability (2003), PGA Tour, Inc. v. Martin case (2001)
- Touch the Future Conference – Accessibility panel (2001)

== Honors and recognitions ==
=== Academic honors ===
- Dean’s Distinguished Service Award, Mercer Law (2000)
- Cabrini Medal of Honor (1996)
- Georgia’s Blind Person of the Year (1992)
- Eagle Scout (1988)
- Numerous academic and leadership awards at Georgia Southern University

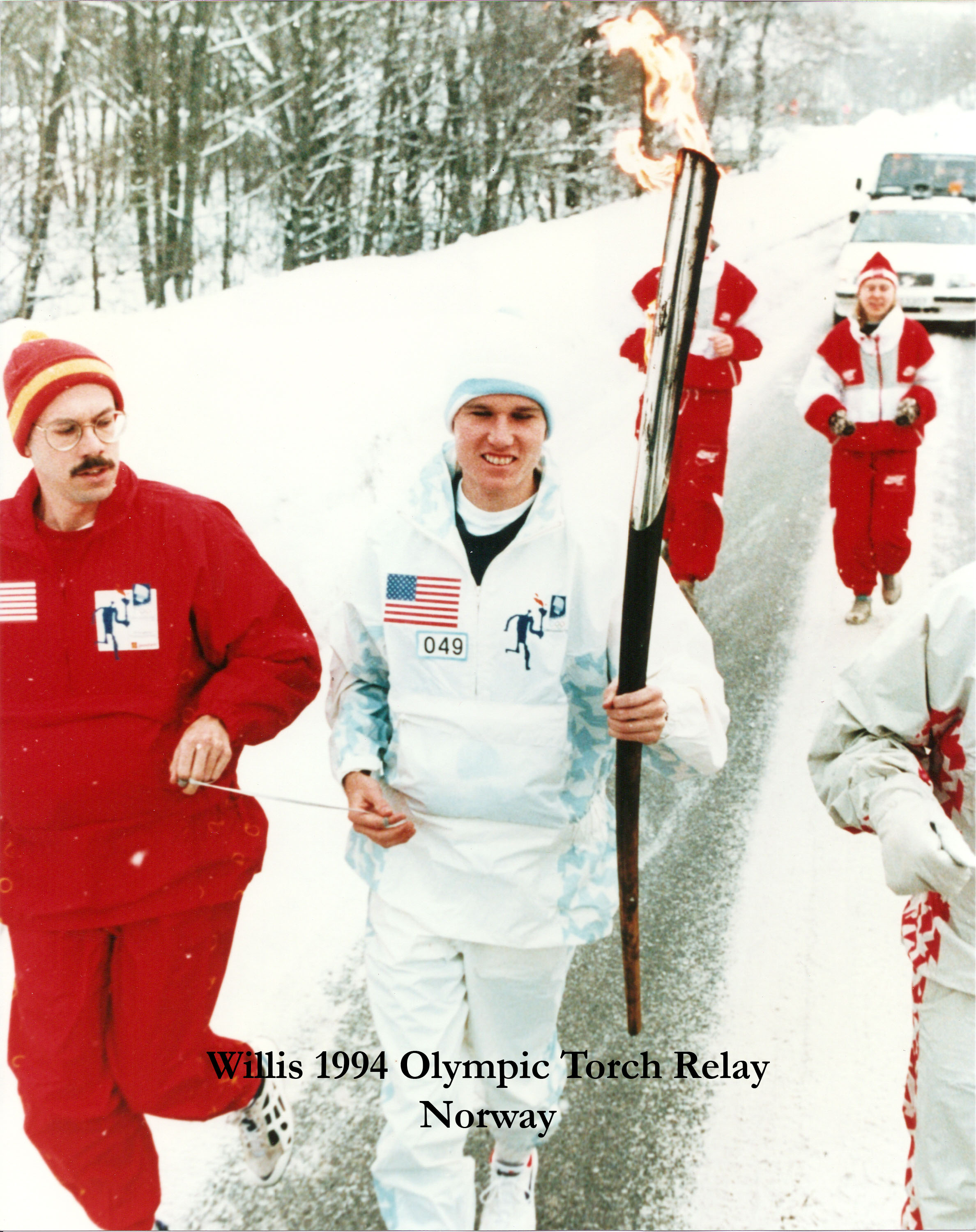
Willis carrying the torch in Norway, 1994

=== Athletic honors ===
- Inducted into Georgia Southern University Athletic Hall of Fame (2006)
- World Record, T11 10,000 m (1995–2002)
- USABA Male Athlete of the Year (1996); Hall of Fame Inductee (2020)
- Georgia Sports Hall of Fame Achievement Award (1995)
- Olympic and Paralympic torchbearer (1994, 1996)
- Ran with President Bill Clinton (1994)
- Finalist: James E. Sullivan Award and USOPC Male Athlete of the Year

=== Medal record ===
- 1994 World Championships (Berlin): Gold (10,000 m), Silver (5,000 m), Bronze (1,500 m)
- 1996 Paralympics (Atlanta): Silver (10,000 m), 3×Bronze (1,500 m, 5,000 m, 4×400 m relay)
- 1998 World Championships (Madrid): Two Silver medals
- 2000 Paralympics (Sydney): Bronze (10,000 m)
- 1992 Paralympics (Barcelona): 4th (1,500 m), 5th (5,000 m)
- 1990 World Championships (Assen): Bronze (4×400 m relay)

== T11 National Records ==
Tim Willis – T11 National Records
| Event | Time | Year |
|---|---|---|
| 800 meters | 2:08.97 | 1992 |
| 1500 meters | 4:16.23 | 1994 |
| 3000 meters | 9:18.90 | — |
| 5000 meters | 16:04.28 | 1996 |
| 10,000 meters | 33:54.70 | 1996 |
| Mile (Road) | 4:28.5 | 1995 |
| 5K (Road) | 16:11.00 | 1999 |
| 10K (Road) | 33:31.00 | 1995 |
| Half Marathon | 1:16:25 | 1996 |

== Personal life ==
Willis resides in Chattanooga, Tennessee, where he practices law and advocates for disability rights.
