= Athletics at the 2004 Summer Paralympics – Men's 1500 metres T36–37 =

Men's 1500m races for athletes with cerebral palsy at the 2004 Summer Paralympics were held in the Athens Olympic Stadium on 20 & 26 September. Events were held in two disability classes, each running a single race.

== T36 ==
Men's 1,500m T36 at the XII Paralympic Games
- Venue: Athens Olympic Stadium
- Dates: 26 September 2004
- Competitors: 8 from 6 nations
- Winning time: 4:37.75

Medalists
1st place, gold medalist(s)		Artem Arefyev	Russia
2nd place, silver medalist(s)		Jose M. Pampano	Spain
3rd place, bronze medalist(s)		He Cheng En	China

The T36 event consisted of a single race. It was won by Artem Arefyev, representing Russia.

=== Final Round ===
26 September 2004, 19:30

Rank	Athlete	Time	Notes
1st place, gold medalist(s)	Artem Arefyev (RUS)	4:37.75	WR
2nd place, silver medalist(s)	Jose M. Pampano (ESP)	4:39.80	
3rd place, bronze medalist(s)	He Cheng En (CHN)	4:40.32	
4	Choi Yong Jin (KOR)	4:50.98	
5	Malcolm Bennett (AUS)	5:04.71	
6	Konstantinos Gasparidis (GRE)	5:08.05	
7	Angelo Perez Galan (ESP)	5:19.00	
8	Panagiotis Karaseridis (GRE)	5:19.69	

== T37 ==
Men's 1,500m T37 at the XII Paralympic Games
- Venue: Athens Olympic Stadium
- Dates: 20 September 2004
- Competitors: 11 from 10 nations
- Winning time: 4:22.09

Medalists
1st place, gold medalist(s)		Mohamed Charmi	Tunisia
2nd place, silver medalist(s)		Oleksandr Driha	Ukraine
3rd place, bronze medalist(s)		Khaled Hanani	Algeria

The T37 event consisted of a single race. It was won by Mohamed Charmi, representing Tunisia.

=== Final Round ===
20 September 2004, 19:45

Rank	Athlete	Time	Notes
1st place, gold medalist(s)	Mohamed Charmi (TUN)	4:22.09	WR
2nd place, silver medalist(s)	Oleksandr Driha (UKR)	4:25.42	
3rd place, bronze medalist(s)	Khaled Hanani (ALG)	4:26.05	
4	Mariusz Tubielewicz (POL)	4:27.05	
5	Micha Janse (NED)	4:38.83	
6	Kasper Nordlinder (SWE)	4:44.93	
7	Benny Govaerts (BEL)	4:45.86	
8	Rezki Reguig (ALG)	4:48.03	
9	Carlos Fernandez (ESP)	4:55.41	
10	Kang Sung Kook (KOR)	5:03.80	
11	Gaston Torres (ARG)	5:15.51	
