= Cherine Abdellaoui =

Algerian Paralympic judoka (born 1998)

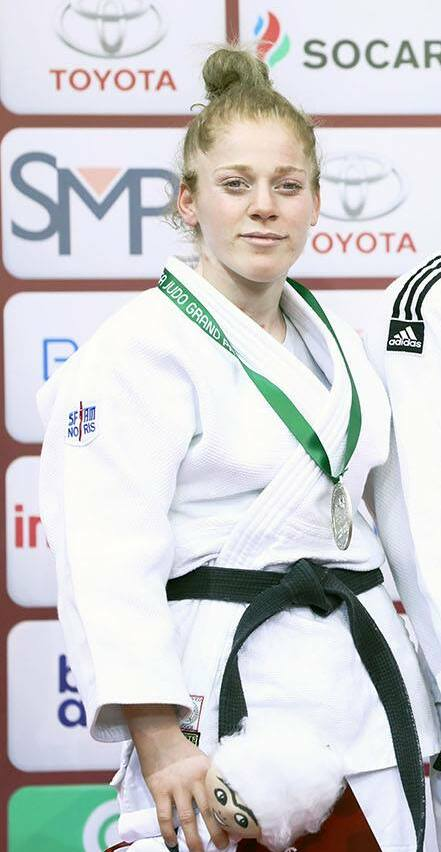

Personal information
- Born: 28 August 1998 (age 28)
- Occupation: Judoka

Sport
- Country: Algeria
- Sport: Para judo
Medal record
Paralympic Games
Gold medal – first place	2020 Tokyo	52 kg
Bronze medal – third place	2016 Rio de Janeiro	52 kg

Profile at external databases
- IJF: 64988
- JudoInside.com: 99808

Cherine Abdellaoui (born 28 August 1998) is an Algerian Paralympic judoka. She won the gold medal in the women's 52 kg event at the 2020 Summer Paralympics held in Tokyo, Japan. She also represented Algeria at the 2016 Summer Paralympics in Rio de Janeiro, Brazil and won a bronze medal in the women's 52 kg event.

In 2019, she won the silver medal at the IBSA Judo Grand Prix in Baku, Azerbaijan, the opening event of the IBSA Judo season.
