= Powerlifting at the 2020 Summer Paralympics – Men's 65 kg =

Powerlifting – Men's 59 kg at the XVI Paralympic Games
- Venue: Tokyo International Forum
- Date: 27 August 2021
- Competitors: 10 from 10 nations

Medalists
1st place, gold medalist(s)		Liu Lei	China
2nd place, silver medalist(s)		Amir Jafari	Iran
3rd place, bronze medalist(s)		Hocine Bettir	Algeria

The men's 65 kg powerlifting event at the 2020 Summer Paralympics was contested on 27 August at Tokyo International Forum.

== Records ==
There are twenty powerlifting events, corresponding to ten weight classes each for men and women. Prior to this competition, the existing world and Paralympic records were as follows.

World Record	Paul Kehinde (NGR)	221.0 kg	Dubai, United Arab Emirates	19 February 2018
Paralympic Record	Paul Kehinde (NGR)	220.0 kg	Rio de Janeiro, Brazil	10 September 2016

== Results ==
Rank	Name	Body weight (kg)	Attempts (kg)				Result (kg)
Rank	Name	Body weight (kg)	1	2	3	4	Result (kg)
1st place, gold medalist(s)	Liu Lei (CHN)	63.87	198	~~199~~	~~199~~		198
2nd place, silver medalist(s)	Amir Jafari (IRI)	64.06	195	~~196~~	~~198~~	–	195
3rd place, bronze medalist(s)	Hocine Bettir (ALG)	63.14	187	192	~~198~~	–	192
4	Grzegorz Lanzer (POL)	61.45	161	166	~~168~~	–	166
5	Adou Herve Ano (CIV)	63.79	~~150~~	~~150~~	160	–	160
6	Narong Kasanun (THA)	62.57	155	~~162~~	~~167~~	–	155
7	Jose Manuel Abud Coronado (DOM)	63.57	~~145~~	~~145~~	145	–	145
	Jorge Carinao (CHI)	60.86	~~187~~	~~187~~	~~192~~	–	–
	Jaideep Deswal (IND)	64.98	~~160~~	~~160~~	~~167~~	–	–
	Mohammad Tarbash (JOR)		–	–	–	–	DNF
