= Ishak Ouldkouider =

Algerian Paralympic judoka (born 1995)

Personal information
- Nationality: Algerian
- Born: 30 May 1995 (age 31)
- Home town: Blida, Algeria
- Occupation: Judoka

Sport
- Country: Algeria
- Sport: Para judo
- Disability class: J2
- Weight class: −60 kg
Medal record
Men's para judo
Representing Algeria
Paralympic Games
Bronze medal – third place	2024 Paris	−60 kg J2

Profile at external databases
- JudoInside.com: 116972

Ishak Ouldkouider (born 30 May 1995) is an Algerian Paralympic judoka.

== Career ==
Ouldkouider represented Algeria at the 2024 Summer Paralympics and won a bronze medal in the −60 kg J2 event.
