= Khaled Hanani =

Algerian Paralympic athlete

Medal record

Track and field (athletics)

Representing Algeria

Paralympic Games
Bronze medal – third place	2004 Athens	1500 metres - T37

Khaled Hanani is a paralympic athlete from Algeria competing mainly in category T37 middle-distance events.

Khaled first competed in the Paralympics in 2004 where as well as competing in the T37 800 m he won the bronze medal in the T37 1500 m. He was unable to repeat this achievement in Beijing in 2008 finishing 8th in the 800 m.
