= Bachir Zergoune =

Algerian Paralympic athlete

Medal record

Paralympic athletics

Representing Algeria

Paralympic Games
Bronze medal – third place	1996 Atlanta	Men's 800m T44-46

Bachir Zergoune is a male Algerian Paralympic Athlete who participated in the 1992 Paralympics and 1996 Paralympics, winning one bronze medal, and also participated in the 2000 Paralympics.
