= Emmanuel Lacroix =

French Paralympic athlete (born 1968)

Medal record

Representing France

Summer Paralympic Games

Men's para athletics
Silver medal – second place	2000 Sydney	1500m – T46
Bronze medal – third place	1996 Atlanta	1500m – T44-46
Bronze medal – third place	1996 Atlanta	5000m – T44-46
Bronze medal – third place	2000 Sydney	4x400m – T46
Bronze medal – third place	2004 Athens	4x400m – T42-46

Men's para swimming
Silver medal – second place	1988 Seoul	100m backstroke – A8
Silver medal – second place	1988 Seoul	100m freestyle – A8
Bronze medal – third place	1988 Seoul	100m butterfly – A8

Winter Paralympic Games

Men's para biathlon
Silver medal – second place	1998 Nagano	7.5km free technique – LW6/8

Emmanuel Lacroix (born 27 August 1968) is a Paralympic athlete from France.

== Biography ==
Emmanuel Lacroix is one of the few people to have competed in summer and winter paralympics multiple times. He began his paralympic career in 1988 in the swimming pool, competing in A8 classification races and winning a bronze in the 100m butterfly and silver in the 100m backstroke and freestyle races. He competed in 1992 in Barcelona but without success. For the next summer games in 1996 Lacroix changed to athletics and won a bronze in the T44-46 classification 1500m and 5000m races. In 2000 he ran the 5000m and marathon, winning a silver in the 1500m and a bronze as part of the French 4 × 400 m relay team. The 2004 Summer Paralympics brought a bronze in the 4 × 400 m.

In his first winter games, in 1994, he competed in the 7.5 km free technique LW5-8 biathlon and in cross-country skiing 10 km free, 5 km classical and 20 km classical technique for LW6/8. He again competed in 1998 Winter Paralympics where he won a bronze, in the 15 km free technique race for LW5/7, 6l8 as well as competing over 20 km and 5 km classical styles. His last paralympics was in 2006, in the 7.5 km and 12.5 km standing biathlon and the 5 km, 10 km and 20 km standing cross country skiing events.
