= Omar Benchiheb =

Algerian Paralympic athlete

Medal record

Paralympic athletics

Representing Algeria

Paralympic Games
Bronze medal – third place	2004 Athens	1500 metres - T11

Omar Benchiheb is a paralympic athlete from Algeria competing mainly in category T11 distance running events.

Omar competed in his first Paralympics in 2000 in the 1500m, 5000m and 10000m for T11, but it was at the 2008 Summer Paralympics where he won a bronze medal in the 1500m and competed in the 5000m.
