= Kamel Kardjena =

Algerian Paralympic athlete (born 1981)

Personal information
- Born: 26 May 1981 (age 45) Oran, Algeria

Sport
- Country: Algeria
- Sport: Para-athletics
- Disability class: F33
- Event: Club throw
Medal record
Men's para-athletics
Representing Algeria
Paralympic Games
Gold medal – first place	2008 Beijing	Shot Put F33-34/52
Gold medal – first place	2012 London	Shot Put F32-33
Bronze medal – third place	2012 London	Discus Throw F32-34
Silver medal – second place	2016 Rio de Janeiro	Shot Put F33
Silver medal – second place	2020 Tokyo	Shot put F33
World Championships
Gold medal – first place	2017 London	Shot put F33
Bronze medal – third place	2025 New Delhi	Shot put F33

Kamel Kardjena (born May 26, 1981) is a Paralympic athlete from Algeria. He has cerebral palsy and competes in seated throwing events in the F33 classification.

== Career ==
He competed in the 2008 Summer Paralympics in Beijing, China, where he won a gold medal in the men's F33-34/52 shot put event. He repeated his performance at the 2012 Summer Paralympics in London, winning the gold medal in the men's F32-33 shot put event.

He is F33 world record holder in shot put. He set this record at the 2011 IPC Athletics World Championships is Christchurch.

At 2016 Summer Paralympics in Rio de Janeiro he won the silver medal in men's F33 shot put event.

== Personal ==
Kardjena was born in Oran, Algeria.
