= Mohamed Allek =

Algerian Paralympic athlete (1974–2016)

Medal record

Athletics (track and field)

Representing Algeria

Paralympic Games
Gold medal – first place	1996 Atlanta	100 m T36
Gold medal – first place	1996 Atlanta	200 m T36
Gold medal – first place	2000 Sydney	100 m T37
Gold medal – first place	2000 Sydney	200 m T37
Gold medal – first place	2000 Sydney	400 m T37
Bronze medal – third place	2004 Athens	200 m T37

Mohamed Allek Arabic: محمد علاك; (17 August 1974 – 8 March 2016) was a Paralympian athlete from Algeria, competing mainly in category T37 sprint events. He was born in Agouni Gueghrane.

In the 1996 Summer Paralympics Allek won gold medals in the T37 100 m and 200 m but missed out on a medal in the 400 m. Four years later in Sydney he made amends and won a clean sweep of the T37 sprint gold medals. In 2004 he was only able to compete in the 200 m and only won a bronze. In Beijing in 2008 he competed in the 100 m, 200 m and as part of the Algerian 4 × 100 m squad but failed to win any medals for the first time.

Allek died in Algiers on the night of 7–8 March 2016, at the age of 41.
