= Hocine Bettir =

Algerian Paralympic powerlifter

Personal information
- Full name: Hocine Bettir
- Born: 2 August 1990 (age 36) Tighennif, Algeria

Sport
- Country: Algeria
- Sport: Paralympic powerlifting
Medal record
Paralympic Games
Bronze medal – third place	2020 Tokyo	65 kg
Bronze medal – third place	2024 Paris	65 kg
World Championships
Gold medal – first place	2021 Tbilisi	65 kg
Silver medal – second place	2019 Nur-Sultan	65 kg
Bronze medal – third place	2017 Mexico City	65 kg

Hocine Bettir (Arabic: حسين بطير; born 2 August 1990) is an Algerian Paralympic powerlifter. At the 2020 Summer Paralympics, he won the bronze medal in the men's 65 kg event. A few months later, he won the gold medal in his event at the 2021 World Para Powerlifting Championships held in Tbilisi, Georgia.
