= Hakim Yahiaoui =

Algerian Paralympic athlete

Medal record

Paralympic athletics

Representing Algeria

Paralympic Games
Silver medal – second place	2004 Athens	Discus Throw - F13

Hakim Yahiaoui is a Paralympian athlete from Algeria competing mainly in category F13 discus throw events.

Yahiaoui has competed in three Paralympics. He competed in the shot put and discus events in 1996, 2000 and 2004 winning a silver medal in the discus in 2004 in Athens, Greece.
