= Mohamed Aissaoui =

Algerian Paralympic athlete

Medal record

Paralympic athletics

Representing Algeria

Paralympic Games
Bronze medal – third place	2004 Athens	1500 metres - T46

Mohamed Aissaoui is a paralympic athlete from Algeria competing mainly in category T46 middle-distance events.

== Athletics ==
=== Paralympics ===
Aissaoui competed in the 800m, 1500m and 5000m in both the 2000 and 2004 Summer Paralympics and won the bronze medal in the 1500m in Athens in 2004. He also competed in the 1500m in the 2008 Summer Paralympics in Beijing, where he placed seventh.
