= Lahouari Bahlaz =

Algerian Paralympic athlete

Personal information
- Nationality: Algerian
- Born: 12 March 1979 (age 47) Oran, Algeria

Sport
- Country: Algeria
- Sport: Athletics
- Disability: Cerebral Palsy
- Disability class: F32
- Club: El-Amel Sports Association
- Coached by: Kadda Mohammed Krachai
Medal record
Men's Athletics
Paralympic Games
Bronze medal – third place	2012 London	Discus – F31/32/52
Bronze medal – third place	2012 London	Club throw – F32–34
IPC World Championships
Gold medal – first place	2011 Christchurch	Discus – F32–34
Gold medal – first place	2011 Christchurch	Club throw – F31/32/52
Gold medal – first place	2013 Lyon	Discus – F32–34
Gold medal – first place	2013 Lyon	Club throw – F31/32/52
Gold medal – first place	2017 London	Club throw – F32
Silver medal – second place	2015 Doha	Club throw – F32

Lahouari Bahlaz (born 12 March 1979) is an Algerian track and field athlete who competes in disability athletics in the F32 category. Bahlaz specializes in both the discus and club throw, winning two bronze medals at the 2012 Summer Paralympics in London.

== Athletics career ==
Bahlaz began training as an athlete at the age of 30. His first major international competition was at the 2011 IPC Athletics World Championships in Christchurch. There he entered two throwing events the club throw and the discus winning gold in both and setting a new world record of 20.30m in the latter. He followed this by representing Algeria at the 2012 Summer Paralympics in London, again competing in the club throw F31/32/52 and discus F32–24. At London he equaled his world record distance in the discus, but he was beaten into third place with world records by both Wang Yanzhang of China (F34) and Hani Alnakhli of Saudi Arabia (F33). Bahlaz took his second bronze medal of the Games with a throw of 36.31m and missing out on the gold medal by 7 points.

He followed this in 2013 with another successful World Championships, beating both Wang and Alnakhli in the discus to retain his gold medal. He also successfully defended his club throw title to leave Lyon with two gold medals.
