= Uruguay at the 2016 Summer Paralympics =

- IPC code: URU
- NPC: Uruguayan Paralympic Committee

in Rio de Janeiro
- Competitors: 4 in 4 sports
- Medals: Gold 0 Silver 0 Bronze 0 Total 0

Summer Paralympics appearances (overview)
- 1992; 1996; 2000; 2004; 2008; 2012; 2016; 2020; 2024

Uruguay competed at the 2016 Summer Paralympics in Rio de Janeiro, Brazil, from 7 to 18 September 2016. They are scheduled to compete in the sport of equestrian.

== Disability classifications ==
Every participant at the Paralympics has their disability grouped into one of five disability categories; amputation, the condition may be congenital or sustained through injury or illness; cerebral palsy; wheelchair athletes, there is often overlap between this and other categories; visual impairment, including blindness; Les autres, any physical disability that does not fall strictly under one of the other categories, for example dwarfism or multiple sclerosis. Each Paralympic sport then has its own classifications, dependent upon the specific physical demands of competition. Events are given a code, made of numbers and letters, describing the type of event and classification of the athletes competing. Some sports, such as athletics, divide athletes by both the category and severity of their disabilities, other sports, for example swimming, group competitors from different categories together, the only separation being based on the severity of the disability.

== Olympic diplomas ==
Name	Sport	Event	Rank	Date
Henry Borges|	Judo	Men's −60 kg	5	8 September
Alfonsina Maldonado	Equestrian	Individual championship test grade IV	8	8 September

== Athletics ==
Men's Track

Athlete	Events	Heat		Semifinal		Final	
Athlete	Events	Time	Rank	Time	Rank	Time	Rank
Eduardo Dutra	100 m T54	16.76	5	—N/a		Did not advance	
Eduardo Dutra	400 m T54	57.08	7	—N/a		Did not advance	

== Equestrian ==
Uruguay have been awarded a single place in the equestrian dressage events through the Bipartite Commission Invitation Allocation. The invitation was to Alfonsina Maldonado.

Athlete	Horse	Event	Total	
Athlete	Horse	Event	Score	Rank
Alfonsina Maldonado	Da Vinci	Individual championship test grade IV	59.857	8

== Judo ==
Athlete	Event	Preliminaries	Quarterfinals	Semifinals	Repechage First round	Repechage Final	Final / BM	
Athlete	Event	Opposition Result	Opposition Result	Opposition Result	Opposition Result	Opposition Result	Opposition Result	Rank
Henry Borges	Men's −60 kg	Chang (TPE); W 102–000	Namozov (UZB); L 001–111	Did not advance	Bye	Sariyev (KAZ); W 100–000	Bologa (ROU); L 000–100	5

== Swimming ==
Men

Athlete	Events	Heats		Final	
Athlete	Events	Time	Rank	Time	Rank
Gonzalo Dutra	100 m freestyle S10	58.15	17	Did not advance	
Gonzalo Dutra	100 m breaststroke SB9	1:18.10	14	Did not advance	

== See also ==
- Uruguay at the 2016 Summer Olympics
