= Athletics at the 2000 Summer Paralympics – Men's 200 metres T11 =

Men's 200 metres T11 at the XI Paralympic Games
- Venue: Stadium Australia
- Competitors: 13 from 8 nations
- Winning time: 24.14

Medalists
1st place, gold medalist(s)		Enrique Sanchez-Guijo	Spain
2nd place, silver medalist(s)		Firmino Baptista	Portugal
3rd place, bronze medalist(s)		Júlio Requena	Spain

The men's 200 metres T11 took place in Stadium Australia.

There were four heats with two semifinals and one final round. The T11 is for athletes who have a visual impairments and would run with guides.

== Heats ==
Qualified for semifinals

=== Heat 1 ===
Rank	Athlete	Time	Notes
1	Júlio Requena (ESP)	24.52	
2	Lorenzo Ricci (ITA)	24.53	
3	Jose Gameiro (POR)	24.75	

=== Heat 2 ===
Rank	Athlete	Time	Notes
1	Enrique Sanchez-Guijo (ESP)	24.40	
2	Aladji Ba (FRA)	24.78	
3	Jorge Jay Masso (CUB)	25.83	

=== Heat 3 ===
Rank	Athlete	Time	Notes
1	Carlos Lopes (POR)	24.80	
2	Andrew Curtis (GBR)	24.85	
	Mauro Porpora (ITA)		DNS

=== Heat 4 ===
Rank	Athlete	Time	Notes
1	Petr Novak (CZE)	24.32	
2	Firmino Baptista (POR)	24.39	
3	Luis Bullido (ESP)	24.60	
4	Jorge Llerena (URU)	1:20.25	

== Semifinals ==
Qualified for final round

=== Heat 1 ===
Rank	Athlete	Time	Notes
1	Firmino Baptista (POR)	24.48	
2	Petr Novak (CZE)	24.61	
3	Carlos Lopes (POR)	24.76	
4	Luis Bullido (ESP)	24.94	

=== Heat 2 ===
Rank	Athlete	Time	Notes
1	Enrique Sanchez-Guijo (ESP)	24.14	
2	Lorenzo Ricci (ITA)	24.37	
3	Júlio Requena (ESP)	24.55	
4	Jose Gameiro (POR)	25.22	

== Final round ==
Rank	Athlete	Time	Notes
1st place, gold medalist(s)	Enrique Sanchez-Guijo (ESP)	24.14	
2nd place, silver medalist(s)	Firmino Baptista (POR)	24.31	
3rd place, bronze medalist(s)	Júlio Requena (ESP)	25.04	
4	Lorenzo Ricci (ITA)	25.38	
