= Romania at the 2016 Summer Paralympics =

- IPC code: ROU
- NPC: National Paralympic Committee

in Rio de Janeiro
- Competitors: 12 in 6 sports
- Flag bearer: Eduard Novak
- Medals Ranked 76th: Gold 0 Silver 0 Bronze 1 Total 1

Summer Paralympics appearances (overview)
- 1972; 1976–1992; 1996; 2000; 2004; 2008; 2012; 2016; 2020; 2024

Romania competed at the 2016 Summer Paralympics in Rio de Janeiro, Brazil, from 7 to 18 September 2016.

== Disability classifications ==
Every participant at the Paralympics has their disability grouped into one of five disability categories; amputation, the condition may be congenital or sustained through injury or illness; cerebral palsy; wheelchair athletes, there is often overlap between this and other categories; visual impairment, including blindness; Les autres, any physical disability that does not fall strictly under one of the other categories, for example dwarfism or multiple sclerosis. Each Paralympic sport then has its own classifications, dependent upon the specific physical demands of competition. Events are given a code, made of numbers and letters, describing the type of event and classification of the athletes competing. Some sports, such as athletics, divide athletes by both the category and severity of their disabilities, other sports, for example swimming, group competitors from different categories together, the only separation being based on the severity of the disability.

== Medallists ==
Medal	Name	Sport	Event	Date
Bronze	Alex Bologa	Judo	Men's 60 kg	8 September

== Competitors ==
The following is the list of number of competitors participating in the Games.

Sport	Men	Women	Total
Athletics	1	1	2
Cycling	2	0	2
Judo	1	0	1
Paracanoe	1	1	2
Swimming	2	1	3
Table tennis	2	0	2
Total	9	2	12

== Athletics ==
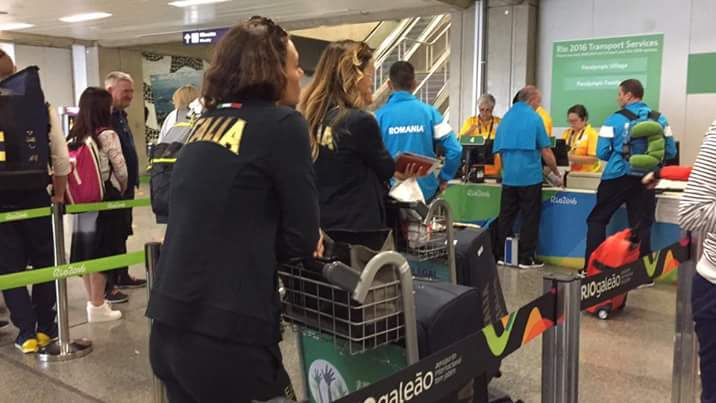
Romanian athletes awaiting accreditation for the Rio Games.

Romania has qualified 2 athletes for 2016 Summer Paralympics. Florentina Hrişcu is the first female athlete to qualify for Romania in athletics at the Paralympic Games.

Field Events - Women

Athlete	Events	Result	Rank
Florentina Hrișcu	Discus F43/44	18.59	12

Field Events - Men

Athlete	Events	Result	Rank
Florin Cojoc	High jump T45/46/47	1.75	10

== Cycling ==
With one pathway for qualification being one highest ranked NPCs on the UCI Para-Cycling male and female Nations Ranking Lists on 31 December 2014, Romania qualified for the 2016 Summer Paralympics in Rio, assuming they continued to meet all other eligibility requirements. After final rankings, Romania has qualified 2 cyclists 2016 Summer Paralympics.

=== Road ===
Men

Athlete	Event	Time	Rank
Carol-Eduard Novak	Road Race C4-5	2:18:07	9
Carol-Eduard Novak	Time Trial C4	40:02.02	6
Attila Olah	Road Race C1-2-3	2:07:59	29
Attila Olah	Time Trial C2	33:20.80	14

=== Track ===
Time Trial

Athlete	Event	Time	Rank
Attila Olah	Men's 1km Time Trial C1-2-3	1:22.914	26

Individual Pursuit

Athlete	Event	Heats		Final	
Athlete	Event	Time	Rank	Opposition Time	Rank
Carol-Eduard Novak	Men's Individual Pursuit C4	4:51.037	5	Did not qualify	

== Judo ==
Romania has received an invitational spot for men extra-lightweight (60 kg) for 2016 Summer Paralympics.

Men

Athlete	Event	Round of 16	Quarterfinals	Semifinals	First repechage round	Repechage semifinals	Final/BM	
Athlete	Event	Opposition Result	Opposition Result	Opposition Result	Opposition Result	Opposition Result	Opposition Result	Rank
Alexandru Bologa	-60 kg	Lee Minjae (KOR); W 000^{3}–000^{2}	Mouloud Noura (ALG); W 000^{3}–000^{2}	Hirose Makoto (JPN); L 000–100	N/A		Henry Borges (URU); W 100-000	3rd place, bronze medalist(s)

== Paracanoeing ==
Romania earned a qualifying spot at the 2016 Summer Paralympics in this sport following their performance at the 2015 ICF Canoe Sprint & Paracanoe World Championships in Milan, Italy where the top six finishers in each Paralympic event earned a qualifying spot for their nation. Mihaela Lulea earned the spot for Romania after finishing fourth in the women's KL3 event. Iulian Serban earned a second spot for Romania after finishing fourth in the men's KL3 event.

Men

Athlete	Event	Heats		Semi-Final		Final	
Athlete	Event	Time	Rank	Time	Rank	Time	Rank
Iulian Șerban	Men's KL3	43.223	3 Q	N/A		41.200	4

Women

Athlete	Event	Heats		Semi-Final		Final	
Athlete	Event	Time	Rank	Time	Rank	Time	Rank
Mihaela Lulea	Women's KL3	55.479	7 Q	54.665	1 Q	52.273	4

== Swimming ==
Men

Athletes	Event	Heat		Final	
Athletes	Event	Time	Rank	Time	Rank
Samuel Ciorap	100 m backstroke S12	1:09.30	11	Did not qualify	
Samuel Ciorap	50 m freestyle S12	26.36	18	Did not qualify	
Samuel Ciorap	100 m breaststroke SB12	1:13.92	9	Did not qualify	
Octavian Ilina	200 m freestyle S2	5:44.10	9	Did not qualify	
Octavian Ilina	50 m backstroke S2	1:13.81	9	Did not qualify	
Octavian Ilina	100 m backstroke S2	2:49.34	10	Did not qualify	

Women

Athletes	Event	Heat		Final	
Athletes	Event	Time	Rank	Time	Rank
Naomi Ciorap	100 m breaststroke S13	1:22.00	12	Did not qualify	
Naomi Ciorap	100 m butterfly S13	1:22.55	19	Did not qualify	
Naomi Ciorap	50 m freestyle S13	30.93	19	Did not qualify	

== Table tennis ==
Men

Athlete	Event	Group stage			1St Round	Quarterfinals	Semifinals	Final	
Athlete	Event	Opposition Result	Opposition Result	Rank	Opposition Result	Opposition Result	Opposition Result	Opposition Result	Rank
Dacian Makszin	Individual C3	Thomas Schmidberger (GER); L 0-3	Anurak Laowong (THA); L 1-3	3	Did not qualify				
Bobi Simion	Individual C6	Alvaro Vargas Munoz Valera (ESP); L 0-3	Christian Dettoni (CHI); W 3-2	2	Michal Jensen (DEN); W 3-2	Peter Rosenmeier (DEN); L 0-3	Did not qualify		

== See also ==
- Romania at the 2016 Summer Olympics
