= Judo at the 2008 Summer Paralympics – Men's 60 kg =

Judo competition

Judo - Men's 60 kg at the XIII Paralympic Games
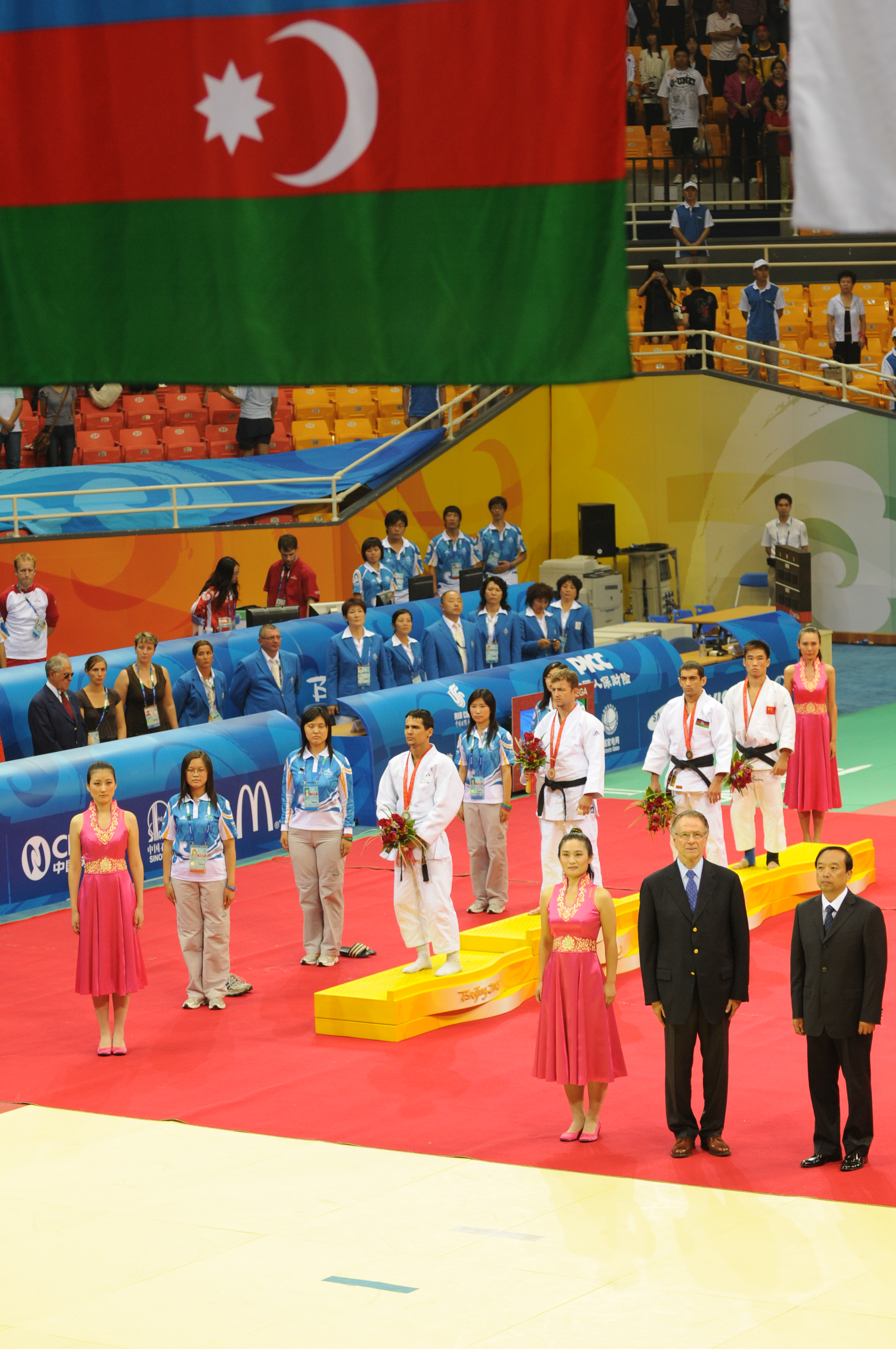
- Awarding ceremony
- Venue: Beijing Workers' Gymnasium
- Date: September 7, 2008
- Competitors: 12 from 12 nations

Medalists
1st place, gold medalist(s)		Mouloud Noura	Algeria
2nd place, silver medalist(s)		Saeid Rahmati	Iran
3rd place, bronze medalist(s)		Ramin Ibrahimov	Azerbaijan
3rd place, bronze medalist(s)		Li Xiaodong	China

The men's 60 kg judo competition at the 2008 Summer Paralympics was held on September 7 at the Beijing Workers' Gymnasium. Preliminary rounds started at 12:00 pm CST. Repechage finals, semifinals, bouts for bronze medals, and the final were held at 5:00 pm CST.

This event was the lightest of the men's judo weight classes, limiting competitors to a maximum of 60 kilograms of body mass. Like all other judo events, bouts lasted five minutes. If the bout was still tied at the end, it was extended for another five-minute, sudden-death period; if neither judoka scored during that period, the match is decided by the judges. The tournament bracket consisted of a single-elimination contest culminating in a gold medal match. There was also a repechage to determine the winners of the two bronze medals. Each judoka who had lost to a semifinalist competed in the repechage. The two judokas who lost in the semifinals faced the winner of the opposite half of the bracket's repechage in bronze medal bouts.

== Final ranking ==
Rank	Name
Gold medal	Mouloud Noura (ALG)
Silver medal	Saeid Rahmati (IRI)
Bronze medal	Ramin Ibrahimov (AZE)
Bronze medal	Li Xiaodong (CHN)
5	Ben Quilter (GBR)
5	Said Shakhmanov (RUS)
7	Sergio Perez (CUB)
7	Makoto Hirose (JPN)

== Tournament results ==
First Round
Helder Araujo (BRA)	0001
Li Xiaodong (CHN)	0101^{1}
Saeid Rahmati (IRI)	1000
Henry Borges (URU)	0010
Juan Pablo Castellanos (COL)	0000
Makoto Hirose (JPN)	1010
Ihor Zasyadkovych (UKR)	0000
Ramin Ibrahimov (AZE)	1000

Quarterfinals
Ben Quilter (GBR)	0000^{1}
Li Xiaodong (CHN)	0001
Sergio Perez (CUB)	0010
Saeid Rahmati (IRI)	0100^{2}
Mouloud Noura (ALG)	1000
Makoto Hirose (JPN)	0001
Said Shakhmanov (RUS)	0000
Ramin Ibrahimov (AZE)	1000

Semifinals
Li Xiaodong (CHN)	0000
Saeid Rahmati (IRI)	1000
Mouloud Noura (ALG)	1000^{1}
Ramin Ibrahimov (AZE)	0001

Final
Saeid Rahmati (IRI)	0000
Mouloud Noura (ALG)	1000

=== Repechage ===
First round
Helder Araujo (BRA)	0000
Ben Quilter (GBR)	1010
Henry Borges (URU)	0000
Sergio Perez (CUB)	0200
Makoto Hirose (JPN)
Bye
Ihor Zasyadkovych (UKR)	0001
Said Shakhmanov (RUS)	0010^{1}

Second round
Ben Quilter (GBR)	1000
Sergio Perez (CUB)	0000
Makoto Hirose (JPN)	0101
Said Shakhmanov (RUS)	1000

Bronze medal finals
Ben Quilter (GBR)	0000
Ramin Ibrahimov (AZE)	1000
Said Shakhmanov (RUS)	0000
Li Xiaodong (CHN)	1000
