= Athletics at the 2000 Summer Paralympics – Men's 100 metres T11 =

Men's 100 metres T11 at the XI Paralympic Games
- Paralympic Athletics
- Venue: Stadium Australia
- Competitors: 15 from 13 nations

Medalists
| 1st place, gold medalist(s) | | Lorenzo Ricci | Italy |
| 2nd place, silver medalist(s) | | Petr Novak | Czech Republic |
| 3rd place, bronze medalist(s) | | Oleksandr Ivanyukhin | Ukraine |

The Men's 100 metres T11 event for the 2000 Summer Paralympics took place at the Stadium Australia.

The T11 category is for athletes with a visual impairment. A T11 athlete may be entirely without sight, or be able to perceive light, but have no ability to see the shape of a hand at any distance. T11 athletes commonly run with guides.

== Results ==
=== Round 1 ===
Athletes qualified for the semi-final if they won their heat or achieved one of the 4 fastest other times.

==== Heat 1 ====
| Rank | Athlete | Country | Time | Notes |
|---|---|---|---|---|
| 1 | Julio Requena | Spain | 12.50 | Q |
| 2 | Edouard Agboessi | Benin | 13.42 | |
| 3 | Aina Onja | Madagascar | 13.98 | |
| 4 | Jorge Jay Masso | Cuba | DNS | |

==== Heat 2 ====
| Rank | Athlete | Country | Time | Notes |
|---|---|---|---|---|
| 1 | Petr Novak | Czech Republic | 11.87 | Q |
| 2 | Firmino Baptista | Portugal | 12.00 | q |
| 3 | Enrique Sanchez-Guijo | Spain | 12.13 | |
| 4 | Guglielmo Boni | Italy | 12.54 | |

==== Heat 3 ====
| Rank | Athlete | Country | Time | Notes |
|---|---|---|---|---|
| 1 | Oleksandr Ivanyukhin | Ukraine | 11.87 | Q |
| 2 | Koji Saito | Japan | 11.90 | q |
| 3 | Athanasios Barakas | Greece | 12.45 | |

==== Heat 4 ====
| Rank | Athlete | Country | Time | Notes |
|---|---|---|---|---|
| 1 | Lorenzo Ricci | Italy | 11.81 | Q |
| 2 | Andrew Curtis | Great Britain | 11.82 | q |
| 3 | José Manuel Rodríguez | Spain | 11.92 | q |
| 4 | Zeynidin Bilalov | Azerbaijan | 12.38 | |

=== Semi-finals ===
Athletes qualified for the final if they won their race, or achieved one of the next 2 fastest times.

==== Heat 1 ====
| Rank | Athlete | Country | Time | Notes |
|---|---|---|---|---|
| 1 | Lorenzo Ricci | Italy | 11.65 | Q, PR |
| 2 | Firmino Baptista | Portugal | 11.79 | |
| 3 | Andrew Curtis | Great Britain | 11.90 | |
| 4 | Julio Requena | Spain | 11.96 | |

==== Heat 2 ====
| Rank | Athlete | Country | Time | Notes |
|---|---|---|---|---|
| 1 | Petr Novak | Czech Republic | 11.68 | Q |
| 2 | Koji Saito | Japan | 11.77 | q |
| 3 | Oleksandr Ivanyukhin | Ukraine | 11.78 | q |
| 4 | José Manuel Rodríguez | Spain | 11.96 | |

=== Final ===
| Rank | Athlete | Country | Time | Notes |
|---|---|---|---|---|
| 1st place, gold medalist(s) | Lorenzo Ricci | Italy | 11.69 | |
| 2nd place, silver medalist(s) | Petr Novak | Czech Republic | 11.71 | |
| 3rd place, bronze medalist(s) | Oleksandr Ivanyukhin | Ukraine | 11.84 | |
| 4 | Koji Saito | Japan | 11.90 | |
