= Judo at the 2016 Summer Paralympics – Men's 60 kg =

Judo competition

Judo – Men's 60 kg at the XV Paralympic Games
- Venue: Carioca Arena 3
- Date: 8 September 2016
- Competitors: 12 from 12 nations

Medalists
1st place, gold medalist(s)		Sherzod Namozov	Uzbekistan
2nd place, silver medalist(s)		Makoto Hirose	Japan
3rd place, bronze medalist(s)		Alex Bologa	Romania
3rd place, bronze medalist(s)		Bolormaa Uugankhuu	Mongolia

The men's 60 kg judo competition at the 2016 Summer Paralympics was held on 8 September 2016 at Carioca Arena 3.

== Results ==
Round of 16
8	Henry Borges (URU)	102
10	Chang You (TPE)	000
6	Ramin Ibrahimov (AZE)	112
7	Eduardo Gauto (ARG)	000
5	Lee Minjae (KOR)	000^{3}
12	Alex Bologa (ROU)	000^{2}
11	Rayfran Mesquita Pontes (BRA)	000
9	Bolormaa Uugankhuu (MGL)	100

Quarterfinals
1	Sherzod Namozov (UZB)	111
8	Henry Borges (URU)	001
4	Anuar Sariyev (KAZ)	002
6	Ramin Ibrahimov (AZE)	100
2	Mouloud Noura (ALG)	000^{3}
12	Alex Bologa (ROU)	000^{2}
3	Makoto Hirose (JPN)	101
9	Bolormaa Uugankhuu (MGL)	002

Semifinals
1	Sherzod Namozov (UZB)	100
6	Ramin Ibrahimov (AZE)	000
12	Alex Bologa (ROU)	000
3	Makoto Hirose (JPN)	100

Final
1	Sherzod Namozov (UZB)	100^{2}
3	Makoto Hirose (JPN)	000

=== Repechage ===
Repechage
Eduardo Gauto (ARG)	000
Anuar Sariyev (KAZ)	101
Lee Minjae (KOR)	010
Mouloud Noura (ALG)	000

Repechage Finals
Henry Borges (URU)	100
Anuar Sariyev (KAZ)	000
Lee Minjae (KOR)	000
Bolormaa Uugankhuu (MGL)	110

Bronze Medal Matches
Henry Borges (URU)	0
Alex Bologa (ROU)	100
Bolormaa Uugankhuu (MGL)	100
Ramin Ibrahimov (AZE)	0
