= Judo at the 2004 Summer Paralympics – Men's 60 kg =

Judo competition

Judo - Men's up to 60 kg at the XII Paralympic Games
- Paralympic Judo
- Venue: Ano Liossia Olympic Hall
- Dates: 18 September 2004
- Competitors: 12 from 12 nations

Medalists
2nd place, silver medalist(s)		Makoto Hirose	Japan
3rd place, bronze medalist(s)		Ihor Zasyadkovych	Ukraine
3rd place, bronze medalist(s)		Norbert Biro	Hungary

The Men's up to 60 kg judo competition at the 2004 Summer Paralympics was held on 18 September at the Ano Liossia Olympic Hall.

The tournament bracket consisted of a single-elimination contest culminating in a gold medal match. There was also a repechage to determine the winners of the two bronze medals. Each judoka who had lost to a semifinalist competed in the repechage. The two judokas who lost in the semifinals faced the winner of the opposite half of the bracket's repechage in bronze medal bouts.

The competition winner on the day was Sergio Arturo Perez, representing Cuba. However, he tested positive for the prohibited anti-inflammatory drug prednisolone, received a warning and reprimand and lost his results and his gold medal. It does not appear that the minor medalists were promoted in consequence of this.

== Results ==
The four digits represent scores of ippon, waza-ari, yuko and koka (which was still used at the time). A letter indicates a penalty of shido, chui, keikoku or hansoku make, which (at the time) also registered a score of koka, yuko, waza-ari or ippon, respectively, to the opponent. Penalties are escalated, thus 2 shido = chui, 3 shido = keikoku, 4 shido = hansoku make, save that a penalty of hansoku make direct results in exclusion from the remainder of the competition, while if it results from escalation it does not.

=== Competition bracket ===
Round of 16
Tsang Chiu Kin (HKG)	0000
Saeed Rahmati (IRI)	1021
Ihor Zasyadkovych (UKR)	0021
Veniamin Michurin (RUS)	0000
Sergio Arturo Perez (CUB)	-
Henry Borges (URU)	-
Lee Ching Chung (TPE)	1000
Norbert Bíró (HUN)	0000

Quarterfinals
Saeed Rahmati (IRI)	0210
Sergio Arturo Diaz (ARG)	0000
Makoto Hirose (JPN)	1022
Ihor Zasyadkovych (UKR)	0000S
Sergio Arturo Perez (CUB)	-
Ren Peng (CHN)	-
Didier Fargeau (FRA)	0020
Lee Ching Chung (TPE)	0200C

Semifinals
Saeed Rahmati (IRI)	0000
Makoto Hirose (JPN)	1000
Sergio Arturo Perez (CUB)	-
Lee Ching Chung (TPE)	-

Final
Makoto Hirose (JPN)	-
Sergio Arturo Perez (CUB)	-

=== Repechage ===
First round
Tsang Chiu Kin (HKG)	0001
Sergio Arturo Diaz (ARG)	1000S
Henry Borges (URU)	1000
Ren Peng (CHN)	0000
Didier Fargeau (FRA)	0000
Norbert Bíró (HUN)	0200

Second round
Sergio Arturo Diaz (ARG)	0001C
Ihor Zasyadkovych (UKR)	0131S
Henry Borges (URU)	0020
Norbert Bíró (HUN)	1000

Bronze medal matches
Ihor Zasyadkovych (UKR)	1000
Lee Ching Chung (TPE)	0000
Norbert Bíró (HUN)	0012S
Saeed Rahmati (IRI)	0011
