= Uruguay at the 2004 Summer Paralympics =

- IPC code: URU
- NPC: Uruguayan Paralympic Committee

in Athens
- Competitors: 3 in 2 sports
- Medals Ranked 76th: Gold 0 Silver 0 Bronze 0 Total 0

Summer Paralympics appearances (overview)
- 1992; 1996; 2000; 2004; 2008; 2012; 2016; 2020; 2024

Uruguay competed at the 2004 Summer Paralympics in Athens, Greece. The team included three athletes, but won no medals.

== Competitors ==
The following is the list of number of competitors in the Games, including game-eligible alternates in team sports.

Sport	Men	Women	Total
Judo	2	0	2
Total	2	0	2

== Olympic diplomas ==
Name	Sport	Event	Rank	Date
Henry Borges|	Judo	Men's −60 kg	7	18 September

== Sports ==
=== Judo ===
Athlete	Event	Preliminary	Quarterfinals	Semifinals	Repechage round 1	Repechage round 2	Final/ Bronze medal contest
Athlete	Event	Opposition Result	Opposition Result	Opposition Result	Opposition Result	Opposition Result	Opposition Result
Henry Borges	Men's 60kg	Perez (CUB); W/O	—N/a		Ren P (CHN); W 1000–0000	Biro (HUN); L 0020-1000	Did not advance
Alfredo Viera	Men's 66kg	Bye	Fujimoto (JPN); L 0000-1000	—N/a	Kail (GBR); L 0000-0200	Did not advance	

== See also ==
- Uruguay at the Paralympics
- Uruguay at the 2004 Summer Olympics
