= Uruguay at the 2020 Summer Paralympics =

Uruguay at the 2021 Summer Paralympics
- IPC code: URU
- NPC: Uruguayan Paralympic Committee

in Tokyo
- Competitors: 2 in 2 sports
- Medals: Gold 0 Silver 0 Bronze 0 Total 0

Summer Paralympics appearances (overview)
- 1992; 1996; 2000; 2004; 2008; 2012; 2016; 2020; 2024

Uruguay competed at the 2020 Summer Paralympics in Tokyo, Japan, from 24 August to 5 September 2021.

== Disability classifications ==
Every participant at the Paralympics has their disability grouped into one of five disability categories; amputation, the condition may be congenital or sustained through injury or illness; cerebral palsy; wheelchair athletes, there is often overlap between this and other categories; visual impairment, including blindness; Les autres, any physical disability that does not fall strictly under one of the other categories, for example dwarfism or multiple sclerosis. Each Paralympic sport then has its own classifications, dependent upon the specific physical demands of competition. Events are given a code, made of numbers and letters, describing the type of event and classification of the athletes competing. Some sports, such as athletics, divide athletes by both the category and severity of their disabilities, other sports, for example swimming, group competitors from different categories together, the only separation being based on the severity of the disability.

== Judo ==
Athlete	Event	First round	Quarter-final	Semi-final	First repechage round	Repechage semi-final	Final	
Athlete	Event	OppositionResult	OppositionResult	OppositionResult	OppositionResult	OppositionResult	OppositionResult	Rank
Henry Borges	Men's 60 kg	Çiftçi (TUR) L 001–010IPP	Did not advance					9

== Swimming ==
Athlete	Event	Heats		Final	
Athlete	Event	Time	Rank	Time	Rank
Lucía Dabezies	Women's 50m freestyle S10	32.62	8	DNA	15
Lucía Dabezies	Women's 100m breaststroke SB9	1:25.54	5	DNA	9

== See also ==
- Uruguay at the 2020 Summer Olympics
