= Judo at the 2000 Summer Paralympics – Men's 60 kg =

Paralympic judo event

Men's 60kg at the XI Paralympic Games
- Competitors: 13 from 13 nations

Medalists
1st place, gold medalist(s)		Sergio Arturo Perez	Cuba
2nd place, silver medalist(s)		Veniamin Mitchourine	Russia
3rd place, bronze medalist(s)		Lee Ching Chung	Chinese Taipei
3rd place, bronze medalist(s)		Jose Carlos Ruiz	Spain

The men's 60kg judo event at the 2000 Summer Paralympics.

== Main round ==
Round of 16
Kim Il Keun (KOR)	0000
Sergio Arturo Perez (CUB)	1000
Norbert Biro (HUN)	1100
Helder Araujo (BRA)	0000
Jose Carlos Ruiz (ESP)	1000
Giuseppe Mariano (ITA)	0000
Lee Ching Chung (TPE)	1010
Christian Zeilermeier (GER)	0000
Konstyantyn Bychkovskyy (UKR)	0010
Veniamin Mitchourine (RUS)	1020

Quarterfinals
Sergio Arturo Perez (CUB)	1012
Norbert Biro (HUN)	0000C
Jose Carlos Ruiz (ESP)	0220
Andrejus Stepanovas (LTU)	0000K
Lee Ching Chung (TPE)	1000
Mohamed Ali Elhur (LBA)	0000
Didier Fargeau (FRA)	0010
Veniamin Mitchourine (RUS)	1000

Semifinals
Sergio Arturo Perez (CUB)	1010
Jose Carlos Ruiz (ESP)	0000
Lee Ching Chung (TPE)	0000
Veniamin Mitchourine (RUS)	0220

Final
Sergio Arturo Perez (CUB)	1001
Veniamin Mitchourine (RUS)	0000S

== Repechage ==
First round
Kim Il Keun (KOR)	0000
Norbert Biro (HUN)	1000
Giuseppe Mariano (ITA)	0200
Andrejus Stepanovas (LTU)	0000
Christian Zeilermeier (GER)	1000
Mohamed Ali Elhur (LBA)	0000

Second round
Norbert Biro (HUN)	1011
Giuseppe Mariano (ITA)	0000
Christian Zeilermeier (GER)	0020
Didier Fargeau (FRA)	1001

Bronze medal matches
Norbert Biro (HUN)	0001
Lee Ching Chung (TPE)	0200
Didier Fargeau (FRA)	0100
Jose Carlos Ruiz (ESP)	1100
