= Judo at the 2020 Summer Paralympics – Men's 60 kg =

Judo – Men's 60 kg at the XVI Paralympic Games
- Paralympic Judo
- Venue: Nippon Budokan
- Date: 27 August 2021
- Competitors: 12 from 12 nations

Medalists
| 1st place, gold medalist(s) | | Vugar Shirinli | Azerbaijan |
| 2nd place, silver medalist(s) | | Anuar Sariyev | Kazakhstan |
| 3rd place, bronze medalist(s) | | Recep Çiftçi | Turkey |
| 3rd place, bronze medalist(s) | | Alex Bologa | Romania |

The men's 60 kg judo competition at the 2020 Summer Paralympics was held on 27 August 2021 at the Nippon Budokan.

== Results ==
=== Bracket ===
Round of 16
Takaaki Hirai (JPN) | 10
Thiego Marques (BRA) | 01
Henry Borges (URU) | 01
Recep Çiftçi (TUR) | 10
Marcos Blanco (VEN) | 01
Ishak Ouldkouider (ALG) | 00
Sükhbaataryn Yadamdorj (MGL) | 10
Zurab Zurabiani (GEO) | 00

Quarterfinals
Alex Bologa (ROU) | 10
Takaaki Hirai (JPN) | 00
Vugar Shirinli (AZE) | 10
Recep Çiftçi (TUR) | 00
Sherzod Namozov (UZB) | 00
Marcos Blanco (VEN) | 01
Anuar Sariyev (KAZ) | 01
Sükhbaataryn Yadamdorj (MGL) | 00

Semifinals
Alex Bologa (ROU) | 00
Vugar Shirinli (AZE) | 01
Marcos Blanco (VEN) | 00
Anuar Sariyev (KAZ) | 10

Final
Vugar Shirinli (AZE) | 10
Anuar Sariyev (KAZ) | 01

=== Repechage ===
Repechage 2
Takaaki Hirai (JPN) | 00
Recep Çiftçi (TUR) | 10

Bronze medal
Recep Çiftçi (TUR) | 10
Marcos Blanco (VEN) | 01

Repechage 1
Ishak Ouldkouider (ALG) | 00
Sherzod Namozov (UZB) | 10

Repechage 2
Sherzod Namozov (UZB) | 10
Sükhbaataryn Yadamdorj (MGL) | 00

Bronze medal
Sherzod Namozov (UZB) | 00
Alex Bologa (ROU) | 10
