= Romania at the 2024 Summer Paralympics =

- IPC code: ROU
- NPC: National Paralympic Committee

in Paris, France August 28, 2024 – September 8, 2024
- Competitors: 6 in 3 sports
- Flag bearers: Camelia Ciripan; Carol-Eduard Novak
- Medals Ranked 61st: Gold 1 Silver 0 Bronze 1 Total 2

Summer Paralympics appearances (overview)
- 1972; 1976–1992; 1996; 2000; 2004; 2008; 2012; 2016; 2020; 2024

Romania competed at the 2024 Summer Paralympics in Paris, France, from 28 August to 8 September.

== Medalists ==
Medal	Name	Sport	Event	Date
Gold	Alex Bologa	Judo	Men's 73 kg J1	6 September
Bronze	Camelia Ciripan	Table tennis	Women's individual C6	7 September

=== Medals by sport ===
Medals by sport
Sport	1st place, gold medalist(s)	2nd place, silver medalist(s)	3rd place, bronze medalist(s)	Total
Judo	1	0	0	1
Table tennis	0	0	1	1
Total	1	0	1	2

=== Medals by gender ===
Medals by gender
Gender	1st place, gold medalist(s)	2nd place, silver medalist(s)	3rd place, bronze medalist(s)	Total
Female	0	0	1	1
Male	1	0	0	1
Mixed	0	0	0	0
Total	1	0	1	2

=== Medals by date ===
Medals by date
Date	1st place, gold medalist(s)	2nd place, silver medalist(s)	3rd place, bronze medalist(s)	Total
6 September	1	0	0	1
7 September	0	0	1	1
Total	1	0	1	2

== Competitors ==
The following is the list of number of competitors in the Games.

Sport	Men	Women	Total
Cycling	2	0	2
Table tennis	1	1	2
Judo	2	0	2
Total	5	1	6

== Cycling ==
Romania entered one male para-cyclist after finished the top eligible nation's at the 2022 UCI Nation's ranking allocation ranking.

=== Track ===
Men

Athlete	Event	Qualification		Final	
Athlete	Event	Result	Rank	Result	Rank
Carol-Eduard Novak	Men's time trial C4-5	1:05.154	7	Did not advance	
Carol-Eduard Novak	Men's pursuit C4	4:33.045	7	Did not advance	

== Judo ==
Athlete	Event	Round of 16	Quarterfinals	Semifinals	Repechage round 1	Repechage round 2	Final/ BM	
Athlete	Event	Opposition Result	Opposition Result	Opposition Result	Opposition Result	Opposition Result	Opposition Result	Rank
Alex Bologa	Men's 73 kg J1	—N/a	Mamedov (UZB); W 10–00	Pereira (BRA); W 01–00	Bye		Shamey (KAZ); W 10–00	1st place, gold medalist(s)
	???	—N/a						

== Table tennis ==
Romania entered three athletes for the Paralympic games. All of them qualified for the games through the allocations of the final ITTF world ranking.

Men

Athlete	Event	Group Stage				Quarterfinals	Semifinals	Final / BM	
Athlete	Event	Opposition Result	Opposition Result	Opposition Result	Rank	Opposition Result	Opposition Result	Opposition Result	Rank
Bobi Simion	Men's individual C6								

Women

Athlete	Event	Round of 16	Quarterfinals	Semifinals	Final / BM	
Athlete	Event	Opposition Result	Opposition Result	Opposition Result	Opposition Result	Rank
Camelia Ciripan	—N/a	Tveiten (NOR); W 3–0	Pickard (GBR); W 3–2	Lytovchenko (UKR); L 0–3	did not advance	3rd place, bronze medalist(s)

== See also ==
- Romania at the 2024 Summer Olympics
- Romania at the Paralympics
