= Romania at the Paralympics =

- IPC code: ROU
- NPC: Romanian National Paralympic Committee
- Medals: Gold 12 Silver 9 Bronze 10 Total 31

Summer appearances
- 1972; 1976–1992; 1996; 2000; 2004; 2008; 2012; 2016; 2020; 2024

Winter appearances
- 2010; 2014; 2018; 2022; 2026

Romania made its Paralympic Games début at the 1972 Summer Paralympics in Heidelberg, sending a single representative (Alex Peer) to compete in table tennis. He was eliminated in his first match. In 1996 Summer Games, it was again represented by a single competitor (Aurel Berbec in powerlifting). Romania was represented again by just one athlete in 2000, and two in 2004, but sent a larger delegation of five athletes to the 2008 Summer Games. It first participated in the Winter Games in 2010. Its sole representative was Laura Valeanu, who entered two events in alpine skiing.

Cyclist Eduard Novak was the best Romanian athlete since then, winning three medals between the 2008 and 2012 Summer Paralympics (one gold in 2012 and two silver in 2008 and 2012), Romanian judoka Alex Bologa was the only medalist at the 2016 Summer Paralympics winning a bronze.

== Medals ==
=== Summer Paralympics ===
| Event | Gold | Silver | Bronze | Total | Ranking |
| (West Germany) 1972 Summer Paralympics | 0 | 0 | 0 | 0 | – |
| (Spain) 1992 Summer Paralympics | 10 | 6 | 7 | 23 | 2 |
| (United States) 1996 Summer Paralympics | 0 | 0 | 0 | 0 | – |
| (Australia) 2000 Summer Paralympics | 0 | 0 | 0 | 0 | – |
| (Greece) 2004 Summer Paralympics | 0 | 0 | 0 | 0 | – |
| (China) 2008 Summer Paralympics | 0 | 1 | 0 | 1 | 63 |
| (United Kingdom) 2012 Summer Paralympics | 1 | 1 | 0 | 2 | 47 |
| (Brazil) 2016 Summer Paralympics | 0 | 0 | 1 | 1 | 76 |
| (Japan) 2020 Summer Paralympics | 0 | 1 | 1 | 2 | 71 |
| (France) 2024 Summer Paralympics | 1 | 0 | 1 | 2 | 61 |
| Total | 12 | 9 | 10 | 31 | 61 |

=== Winter Paralympics ===
| Event | Gold | Silver | Bronze A | Total | Ranking |
| (Canada) 2010 Winter Paralympics | 0 | 0 | 0 | 0 | – |
| (Russia) 2014 Winter Paralympics | 0 | 0 | 0 | 0 | – |
| (South Korea) 2018 Winter Paralympics | 0 | 0 | 0 | 0 | – |
| (China) 2022 Winter Paralympics | 0 | 0 | 0 | 0 | – |
| (Italy) 2026 Winter Paralympics | 0 | 0 | 0 | 0 | – |
| Total | 0 | 0 | 0 | 0 | – |

== Medalists ==
| Medal | Name | Games | Sport | Event |
|---|---|---|---|---|
| Silver | Carol-Eduard Novak | (China) 2008 Beijing | Cycling | Men's road time trial LC2 |
| Gold | Carol-Eduard Novak | (United Kingdom) 2012 London | Cycling | Men's individual pursuit C4 |
| Silver | Carol-Eduard Novak | (United Kingdom) 2012 London | Cycling | Men's road time trial C4 |
| Bronze | Alex Bologa | (Brazil) 2016 Rio de Janeiro | Judo | Men's 60 kg |
| Silver | Carol-Eduard Novak | (Japan) 2020 Tokyo | Cycling | Men's individual pursuit C4 |
| Bronze | Alex Bologa | (Japan) 2020 Tokyo | Judo | Men's 60 kg |
| Gold | Alex Bologa | (France) 2024 Paris | Judo | Men's 73 kg J1 |
| Bronze | Camelia Ciripan | (France) 2024 Paris | Table tennis | Women's individual class 6 |

== See also ==
- Romania at the Olympics
