= Uruguay at the 2024 Summer Paralympics =

2024 sporting event delegation in Paris

- Flag of Uruguay
- IPC code: URU
- NPC: Uruguayan Paralympic Committee

in Paris, France August 28, 2024 – September 8, 2024
- Competitors: 2 (1 man and 1 woman) in 2 sports
- Flag bearers: Hanna Arias; Henry Borges
- Medals: Gold 0 Silver 0 Bronze 0 Total 0

Summer Paralympics appearances (overview)
- 1992; 1996; 2000; 2004; 2008; 2012; 2016; 2020; 2024

Uruguay competed at the 2024 Summer Paralympics in Paris, France, from 28 August to 8 September 2024.

== Competitors ==
The following is the list of number of competitors in the Games, including game-eligible alternates in team sports.

Sport	Men	Women	Total
Judo	1	0	1
Swimming	0	1	1
Total	1	1	2

== Judo ==
Athlete	Event	Round of 16	Quarterfinals	Semifinals	Repechage	Final / BM	
Athlete	Event	Opposition Result	Opposition Result	Opposition Result	Opposition Result	Opposition Result	Rank
Henry Borges	Men's −60 kg J1	Zhu (CHN); L 00–01	Did not advance				

== Swimming ==
Athlete	Event	Heat		Final	
Athlete	Event	Result	Rank	Result	Rank
Hanna Arias	Women's 100 m freestyle S9	1:19.11	15	Did not advance	
Hanna Arias	Women's 100 m butterfly S9	1:28.32	6	Did not advance	

== See also ==
- Uruguay at the 2024 Summer Olympics
- Uruguay at the Paralympics
