= Romania at the 2020 Summer Paralympics =

- IPC code: ROU
- NPC: National Paralympic Committee

in Tokyo
- Competitors: 7 in 5 sports
- Medals: Gold 0 Silver 1 Bronze 1 Total 2

Summer Paralympics appearances (overview)
- 1972; 1976–1992; 1996; 2000; 2004; 2008; 2012; 2016; 2020; 2024

Romania competed at the 2020 Summer Paralympics in Tokyo, Japan, from 24 August to 5 September 2021. The Romanian delegation consisted of seven athletes, six men and one woman. The delegation won two medals, a silver in cycling and one in Judo, placing 65th in a four-way tie.

== Background ==
Originally scheduled to take place in Tokyo, Japan from 24 July to 9 August 2020, the Games were postponed due to the COVID-19 pandemic. They were eventually played in Tokyo from 24 August through 5 September 2021.

The Romania delegation consisted of seven athletes, six men and one woman.

== Medalists ==
The Romanian delegation won two medals, one silver and one bronze, finishing in a joint 65th place in the medal table alongside the delegations of Kuwait, Namibia, and Slovenia.

Medal	Name	Sport	Event	Date	Ref.
Silver	Carol-Eduard Novak	Cycling	Men's individual pursuit C4 4000 meters	27 August 2021	
Bronze	Alex Bologa	Judo	Men's 60 kilograms	27 August 2021	

== Cycling ==
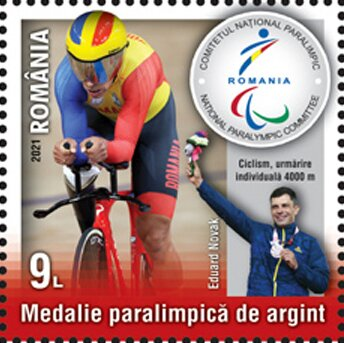
Novak on a 2021 Romanian stamp

Romania sent one cyclist, Minister for Youth and Sport Carol-Eduard Novak, after successfully getting a slot in the European 2018 UCI Nations Ranking Allocation quota. Novak won a silver medal in Men's C4 4000 meter individual pursuit after losing to Jozef Metelka.

== Judo ==
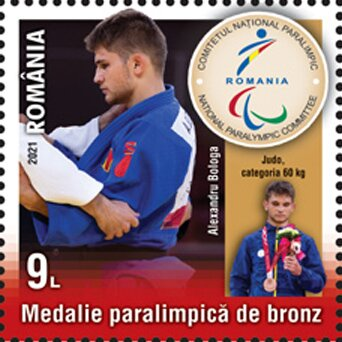
Bologa on a 2021 Romanian stamp

Romania sent one cyclist, Alex Bologa. Bologa won a bronze medal in Men's 60 kilograms. Baloga had previously won in an upset at the same event at the 2016 games being awarded a bronze medal. The event was held at the Nippon Budokan arena.

== Table tennis ==
Romania entered one athlete, Bobi Simion, into the table tennis competition at the games. Simion qualified via the World Ranking allocation. He lost in the quarter finals. Simion had previously represented Romania in the 2016 games where he also lost in the quarter finals.
