= Gameiro =

Gameiro is a Portuguese surname. Notable people with the surname include:

- Corey Gameiro (born 1993), Australian soccer player
- Diogo Gameiro (born 1995), Portuguese basketballer
- José Gameiro, Portuguese Paralympic athlete
- Kevin Gameiro (born 1987), French footballer
- Miguel Gameiro (born 1974), Portuguese singer and chef
- Raquel Gameiro (1889–1970), Portuguese illustrator and watercolorist
