= Romania at the 2008 Summer Paralympics =

- IPC code: ROU
- NPC: National Paralympic Committee

in Beijing
- Competitors: 5 in 3 sports
- Officials: 6
- Medals Ranked 63rd: Gold 0 Silver 1 Bronze 0 Total 1

Summer Paralympics appearances (overview)
- 1972; 1976–1992; 1996; 2000; 2004; 2008; 2012; 2016; 2020; 2024

Romania sent a delegation to compete at the 2008 Paralympics in Beijing. The delegation consisted of five athletes (2 female, 3 male) competing in 3 disciplines, and six officials.

== Medallists ==
The country won one medal, a silver, its first Paralympic medal ever.

Medal	Name	Sport	Event	Date
Silver	Carol-Eduard Novak	Cycling	Men's time trial LC2	12th

== Cycling ==
=== Road ===
Athlete	Event	Time	Rank
Carol-Eduard Novak	Men's individual time trial LC2	34:04.60	Silver medal
Carol-Eduard Novak	Men's Individual Road Race LC1/LC2/CP4	2:02.21	30
Arnold Csaba Butu, Lehel Ruzsa	Tandem Individual time trial B&VI	37:26.38	20
Arnold Csaba Butu, Lehel Ruzsa	Men's Individual Road Race B&VI 1-3	did not finish	

=== Track ===
Men

Athlete	Event	Heats		Quarterfinals		Semifinals		Final	
Athlete	Event	Time	Rank	Time	Rank	Time	Rank	Time	Rank
Carol-Eduard Novak	Men's Individual Pursuit LC2	4:57.806	4	N/A				Boyen (BEL); 4:59.078	4
Carol-Eduard Novak	Men's Individual 1 km time trial LC2	N/A						1:12.739	4
Arnold Csaba Butu, Lehel Ruzsa	Tandem Individual Pursuit B&VI 1-3	5:11.936	14	did not advance					14
Arnold Csaba Butu, Lehel Ruzsa	Men's Individual 1 km time trial B&VI	N/A						1:22.296	16

== Powerlifting ==
Athlete	Event	Total lifted	Rank
Viorica Corina Custura	Women's +82.50 kg	95.0 kg	7

== Tennis ==
Athlete	Event	Round of 64	Round of 32	Round of 16	Quarterfinals	Semifinals	Finals	
Athlete	Event	Opposition Result	Opposition Result	Opposition Result	Opposition Result	Opposition Result	Opposition Result	Rank
Crina Steliana Tugui	Women's singles	N/A	Gravellier (FRA); L 0-6 0-6	did not advance				

== See also ==
- Romania at the Paralympics
- Romania at the 2008 Summer Olympics
