= Uruguay at the 1996 Summer Paralympics =

- IPC code: URU
- NPC: Uruguayan Paralympic Committee

in Atlanta
- Competitors: 1
- Medals Ranked 59th: Gold 0 Silver 0 Bronze 1 Total 1

Summer Paralympics appearances (overview)
- 1992; 1996; 2000; 2004; 2008; 2012; 2016; 2020; 2024

One male athlete from Uruguay competed at the 1996 Summer Paralympics in Atlanta, United States. Jorge Llerena, who won the bronze medal in the Men's 200 m T10 competition.

== Medallists ==
Medal	Name	Sport	Event
Bronze	Jorge Llerena	Athletics	Men's 200m T10

== See also ==
- Uruguay at the Paralympics
- Uruguay at the 1996 Summer Olympics
