= Uruguay at the 2008 Summer Paralympics =

- IPC code: URU
- NPC: Uruguayan Paralympic Committee

in Beijing
- Competitors: 2 in 2 sports
- Medals: Gold 0 Silver 0 Bronze 0 Total 0

Summer Paralympics appearances (overview)
- 1992; 1996; 2000; 2004; 2008; 2012; 2016; 2020; 2024

Uruguay sent a delegation to compete at the 2008 Summer Paralympics in Beijing. The country was represented by two athletes, competing in two sports.

== Athletics ==
Athlete	Event	Final	
Athlete	Event	Result	Rank
Alvaro Pérez	Men's marathon T12	3:29:59	24

== Judo ==
Athlete	Event	First Round	Quarterfinals	Semifinals	Final	
Athlete	Event	Opposition Result	Opposition Result	Opposition Result	Opposition Result	Rank
Henry Borges	Men's 60 kg	Rahmati (IRI); L 0010–0100	did not advance			

== See also ==
- 2008 Summer Paralympics
- Uruguay at the Paralympics
- Uruguay at the 2008 Summer Olympics
