= Romania at the 2012 Summer Paralympics =

- IPC code: ROU
- NPC: National Paralympic Committee

in London
- Competitors: 5 in 4 sports
- Flag bearer: Carol-Eduard Novak
- Medals Ranked 47th: Gold 1 Silver 1 Bronze 0 Total 2

Summer Paralympics appearances (overview)
- 1972; 1976–1992; 1996; 2000; 2004; 2008; 2012; 2016; 2020; 2024

Romania competed at the 2012 Summer Paralympics in London, United Kingdom from August 29 to September 9, 2012.

== Medalists ==
Medal	Name	Sport	Event	Date
Gold	Carol-Eduard Novak	Cycling	Men's individual pursuit C4	1 September
Silver	Carol-Eduard Novak	Cycling	Men's road time trial C4	5 September

== Athletics ==
Men's Field Events

Romania sent for the first time an athlete in Athletics competition.

Athlete	Event	Distance	Rank
Florin Marius Cojoc	Long Jump F46	4.14	11

== Cycling ==
=== Road ===
Men

Athlete	Event	Time	Rank
Carol-Eduard Novak	Road Race C4-5	1:55:54	8
Carol-Eduard Novak	Time Trial C4	33:06.93	2nd place, silver medalist(s)
Imre Torok	Road Race C4-5	DNF	

=== Track ===
Time Trial

Athlete	Event	Time	Rank
Carol-Eduard Novak	Men's 1km Time Trial C4-5	1:09.390	7
Imre Torok	Men's 1km Time Trial C4-5	1:13.774	17

Individual Pursuit

Athlete	Event	Heats		Final	
Athlete	Event	Time	Rank	Opposition Time	Rank
Carol-Eduard Novak	Men's Individual Pursuit C4	4:40.315 WR	1 Q	Ježek (CZE); W 4:42.000	1st place, gold medalist(s)

== Swimming ==
Women

Athletes	Event	Heat		Final	
Athletes	Event	Time	Rank	Time	Rank
Naomi Ciorap	50m freestyle S13	32.53	15	did not advance	
Naomi Ciorap	100m freestyle S13	1:13.30	16	did not advance	
Naomi Ciorap	100m breaststroke SB13	1:34.92	12	did not advance	

== Table tennis ==
Men

Athlete	Event	Group stage			Quarterfinals	Semifinals	Final	
Athlete	Event	Opposition Result	Opposition Result	Rank	Opposition Result	Opposition Result	Opposition Result	Rank
Dacian Makszin	Individual C3	Piñas (ESP); L 0–3	Ohgren (SWE); W 3–2	3	did not advance			

== See also ==
- Romania at the 2012 Summer Olympics
