= Sergey Sevostianov =

Russian Paralympic athlete

Medal record

Track and field (P11)

Representing Soviet Union

Paralympic Games
Silver medal – second place	1988 Seoul	100 metres - B1
Silver medal – second place	1988 Seoul	Pentathlon - B1
Silver medal – second place	1988 Seoul	Triple Jump - B1

Representing Unified Team

Paralympic Games
Gold medal – first place	1992 Barcelona	100 metres - B1
Gold medal – first place	1992 Barcelona	Pentathlon - B1
Silver medal – second place	1992 Barcelona	Triple Jump - B1

Representing Russia

Paralympic Games
Gold medal – first place	1996 Atlanta	Pentathlon - P10
Gold medal – first place	2000 Sydney	Pentathlon - P11
Silver medal – second place	1996 Atlanta	Long jump - F10
Silver medal – second place	2000 Atlanta	Long jump - F11
Bronze medal – third place	2004 Athens	Long jump - F11
Bronze medal – third place	1996 Atlanta	Triple jump - F11

Sergey Sevostianov, (Russian: Сергей Севостьянов), sometimes Sergei Sevastianov, is a blind Paralympian track and field athlete from Russia competing in pentathlon and jumping events.

== Career ==
Sergei first competed for the Soviet Union in the 1988 Summer Paralympics in the pentathlon, 100m and triple jump winning a silver medal in all three. At his second games, competing for the Unified Team, in 1992 Summer Paralympics he won gold in the pentathlon setting a new world record, he also finished joint first with Spain's Julio Requena, he also won silver in the triple jump and finished fifth in the long jump.

He competed in the 1996 Summer Paralympics in Atlanta, United States. There, he won a gold medal in the men's Pentathlon - P10 event, a silver medal in the men's Long jump - F10 event, and went out in the first round of the men's 100 metres - T10 event. He also competed at the 2000 Summer Paralympics in Sydney, Australia. There, he won a gold medal in the men's Pentathlon - P11 event, finished tenth in the men's Long jump - F11 event, and finished fourth in the men's Triple jump - F11 event. He also competed at the 2004 Summer Paralympics in Athens, Greece. There, he won a bronze medal in the men's Long jump - F11 event and a bronze medal in the men's Triple jump - F11 event.

He holds the pentathlon world record for P11 classified athletes, set at the Sydney Paralympics. He set pentathlon world records at 3 consecutive paralympic games: 1992, 1996 and 2000.
