= Romania at the 2004 Summer Paralympics =

- IPC code: ROU (ROM used at these Games)
- NPC: National Paralympic Committee

in Athens
- Competitors: 2 in 2 sports
- Flag bearer: Adrian Sandu
- Medals: Gold 0 Silver 0 Bronze 0 Total 0

Summer Paralympics appearances (overview)
- 1972; 1976–1992; 1996; 2000; 2004; 2008; 2012; 2016; 2020; 2024

Romania competed at the 2004 Summer Paralympics in Athens, Greece. The team included two athletes, both of them men, and won no medals.

== Sports ==
=== Cycling ===
==== Men's road ====
Athlete	Event	Points	Rank
Eduard Novak	Men's road race/time trial LC3	9	4

=== Powerlifting ===
Athlete	Event	Result	Rank
Adrian Sandu	Men's +100kg	175.0	9

== See also ==
- Romania at the Paralympics
- Romania at the 2004 Summer Olympics
