= Vugar Shirinli =

Azerbaijani Paralympic judoka

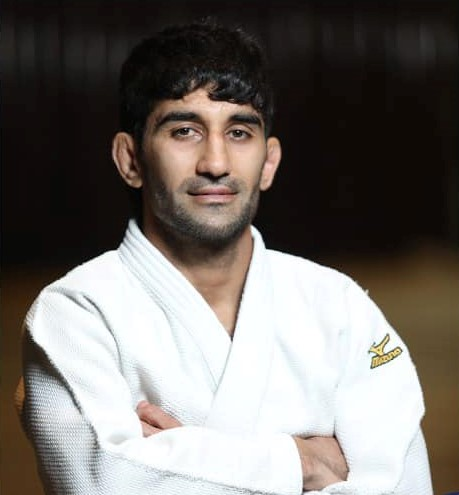

Personal information
- Born: 14 September 1992 (age 33)
- Occupation: Judoka

Sport
- Country: Azerbaijan
- Sport: Judo, Paralympic judo
- Weight class: ‍–‍60 kg

Achievements and titles
- Paralympic Games: (gold) (2020)
- European Champ.: R16 (2013)
Medal record
Representing Azerbaijan
Men's Paralympic judo
Paralympic Games
Gold medal – first place	2020 Tokyo	‍–‍60 kg
Men's judo
European Championships
Bronze medal – third place	2016 Kazan	Men's team
IJF Grand Slam
Silver medal – second place	2014 Baku	‍–‍60 kg
IJF Grand Prix
Gold medal – first place	2017 Tashkent	‍–‍60 kg
Bronze medal – third place	2013 Samsun	‍–‍60 kg
European U23 Championships
Bronze medal – third place	2011 Tyumen	‍–‍60 kg
European Junior Championships
Bronze medal – third place	2010 Samokov	‍–‍60 kg
European Cadet Championships
Gold medal – first place	2008 Sarajevo	‍–‍55 kg
Silver medal – second place	2007 Valletta	‍–‍50 kg

Profile at external databases
- IJF: 1765, 64901
- JudoInside.com: 46338
- Updated on 27 November 2022

Vugar Shirinli (born 14 September 1992) is an Azerbaijani Paralympic judoka. He won the gold medal in the men's 60 kg event at the 2020 Summer Paralympics held in Tokyo, Japan.

Before competing in Paralympic judo, Shirinli won the gold medal in the men's 60 kg event at the 2017 Judo Grand Prix Tashkent held in Tashkent, Uzbekistan.
