= Romania at the 2000 Summer Paralympics =

- IPC code: ROU (ROM used at these Games)
- NPC: National Paralympic Committee

in Sydney
- Competitors: 1
- Medals: Gold 0 Silver 0 Bronze 0 Total 0

Summer Paralympics appearances (overview)
- 1972; 1976–1992; 1996; 2000; 2004; 2008; 2012; 2016; 2020; 2024

Romania participated at the 2000 Summer Paralympics held in Sydney, Australia, held between 18 and 29 October 2000. The country's participation in the Games marked its third appearance at the Summer Paralympics since its debut in the 1972 Paralympic Games. The Romanian team consisted of a lone athlete Adrian Sandu in the para powerlifting event. Romania did not win any medals, and had not won any Paralympic medal as of the Games.

== Background ==
Romania made its debut in the Olympic Games at the 1900 Summer Olympics. Since the 1924 Olympic Games, the nation has competed in most of the Summer and Winter Olympics missing only thrice. The country made its Summer Paralympics debut only in 1972. After the nation made its debut in 1972, it missed the event from 1976 to 1992. Romania returned to the Summer Paralympics for the second time in 1996 and this edition of the Games marked the nation's third appearance at the Summer Paralympic Games. The National Paralympic Committee of Romania is organizing body for the Winter Paralympics in Romania.

The Games were held in Sydney, Australia, from 18 to 29 October 2000, the first time they had been held in the southern hemisphere. A record 3,871 Para athletes (2,883 men and 988 women) from 123 countries took part in 550 medal events across 19 sports. Romania won no medals in the event, and had not won a Paralympic medal as of the Games.

== Competitors ==
The Romania delegation consisted of a single competitor Adrian Sandu, who competed in the powerlifting event.

Sport	Men	Women	Athletes
Powerlifting	1	0	1
Total	1	0	1

== Powerlifting ==
Para powerlifting is open to only athletes who have an impairment in their lower limbs or hips that meets the minimum impairment criteria. While the athletes might be classified into one of the eight eligible physical impairments, the competitions are held based on gender and weight classes. Adrian Sandu represented Romania in the powerlifting competition. This was Sandu's debut in the Paralympic Games in the para powerlifting competition. He would go on to represent Romania in the next Paralympic Games in 2004. In the event, Sandu lifted a weight of 167.5 kg (369 lb). He trailed the gold medalist Amrollah Dehghani of Iran by 65 kg (143 lb) and was classified last amongst the 16 classified finishers in the event.

Athlete	Event	Weight	Rank
Adrian Sandu	Men's 100 kg	167.5	16

== See also ==
- Romania at the Paralympics
- Romania at the 2000 Summer Olympics
