= Athletics at the 1992 Summer Paralympics – Men's 100 metres B1 =

Men's 100 metres B1 at the IX Paralympic Games
- Paralympic Athletics
- Competitors: 8 from 7 nations

Medalists
1st place, gold medalist(s)		Sergei Sevastianov	Unified Team
1st place, gold medalist(s)		Julio Requena	Spain
3rd place, bronze medalist(s)		José Manuel Rodríguez	Spain

The Men's 100 metres B1 was a track event in athletics at the 1992 Summer Paralympics, for visually impaired athletes. It consisted of a single race.

There was a tie for gold between Sergei Sevastianov and Julio Requena.

== Results ==
=== Final ===
Place	Athlete	Time
1	Sergei Sevastianov (EUN)	11:83
1	Julio Requena (ESP)	11:83
3	José Manuel Rodríguez (ESP)	11:94
4	Bernd Uduc (GER)	12:00
5	Luis Garcia (VEN)	12:32
6	Alonzo Jenkins (USA)	12:32
5	Jorge Haig (CUB)	12:32
5	Robert Latham (GBR)	12:32
