= Cycling at the 2012 Summer Paralympics – Men's road time trial C4 =

Cycling, Men's road time trial C4 at the XIV Paralympic Games
- Venue: Brands Hatch
- Dates: September 5, 2012
- Competitors: 14 from 12 nations

Medalists
1st place, gold medalist(s)		Jiří Ježek	Czech Republic
2nd place, silver medalist(s)		Carol-Eduard Novak	Romania
3rd place, bronze medalist(s)		Jiri Bouska	Czech Republic

The Men's time trial C4 road cycling event at the 2012 Summer Paralympics took place on September 5 at Brands Hatch. Fourteen riders from twelve different nations competed. The race distance was 24 km.

== Results ==
Rank	Name	Country	Time
1st place, gold medalist(s)	Jiří Ježek	Czech Republic	32:59.92
2nd place, silver medalist(s)	Carol-Eduard Novak	Romania	33:06.93
3rd place, bronze medalist(s)	Jiri Bouska	Czech Republic	33:34.92
4	Roberto Alcaide	Spain	33:42.57
5	Diego German Duenas Gomez	Colombia	34:46.08
6	Cesar Neira	Spain	35:09.53
7	Sam Kavanagh	United States	35:31.12
8	Dax Jaikel	Costa Rica	35:39.02
9	Manfred Gattringer	Austria	36:43.55
10	Ji Xiaofei	China	37:06.71
11	Masashi Ishii	Japan	37:07.11
12	Koen Reyserhove	Belgium	37:15.51
13	Damian Lopez Alfonso	Cuba	38:08.77
14	Morten Jahr	Norway	38:14.24
