= Li Xiaodong =

Chinese Paralympic judoka

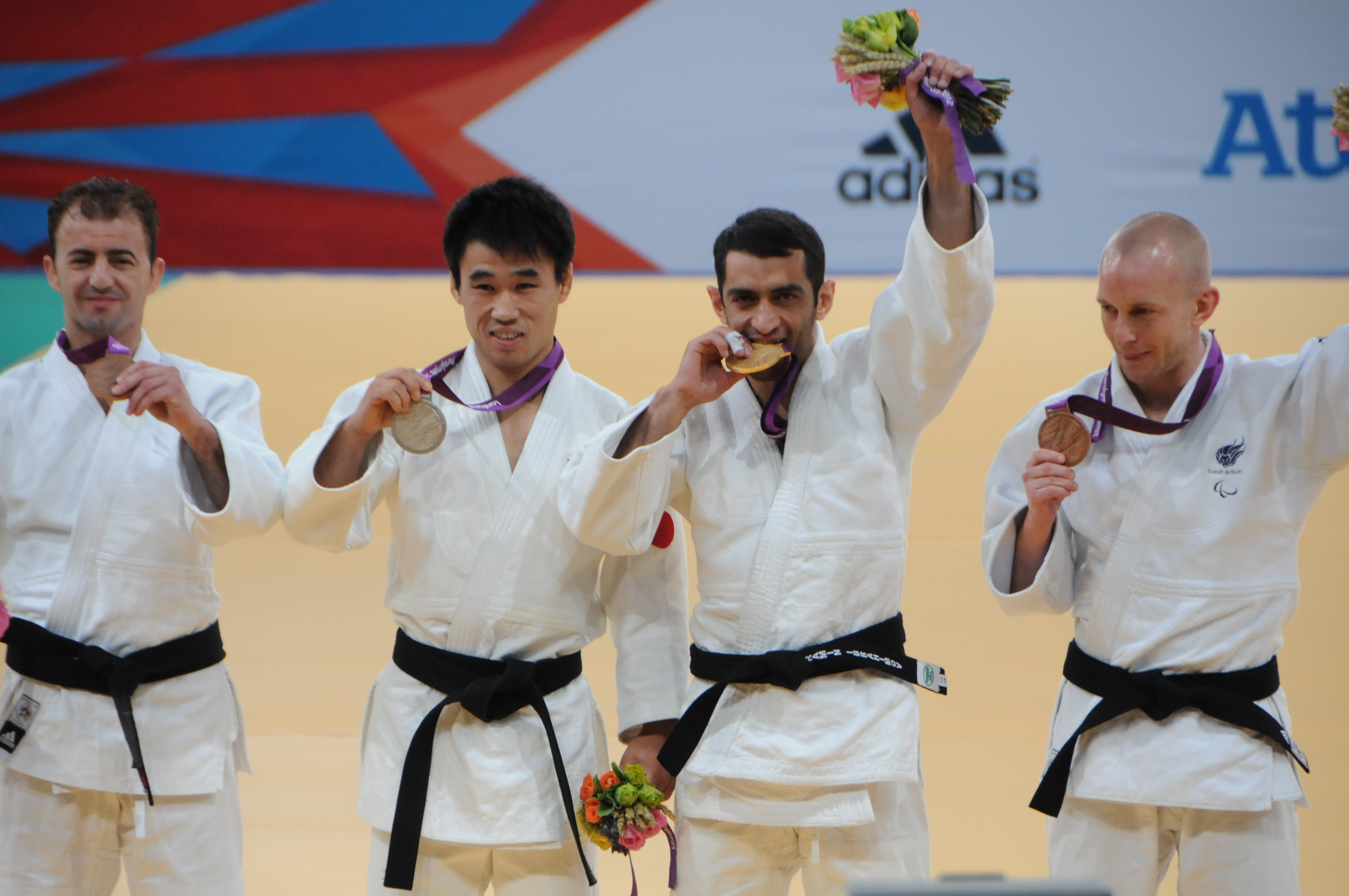
- Li Xiaodong (2012, second from left)

Personal information
- Born: 26 February 1982 (age 44)
- Occupation: Judoka

Sport
- Country: China
- Sport: Paralympic judo
Medal record
Representing China
Paralympic Games
| Bronze medal – third place | 2008 Beijing | 60 kg |
| Silver medal – second place | 2012 London | 60 kg |
Asian Para Games
| Gold medal – first place | 2010 Guangzhou | -60 kg |
| Bronze medal – third place | 2014 Incheon | -60kg |

Li Xiaodong (born 26 February 1982) is a Chinese Paralympic judoka. He represented China at the 2008 Summer Paralympics and at the 2012 Summer Paralympics. He won two medals: one of the bronze medals in the men's 60 kg event in 2008 and the silver medal in the men's 60 kg event in 2012.
