= Judo at the 2012 Summer Paralympics – Men's 60 kg =

Judo competition

Judo – Men's 60 kg at the XIV Paralympic Games
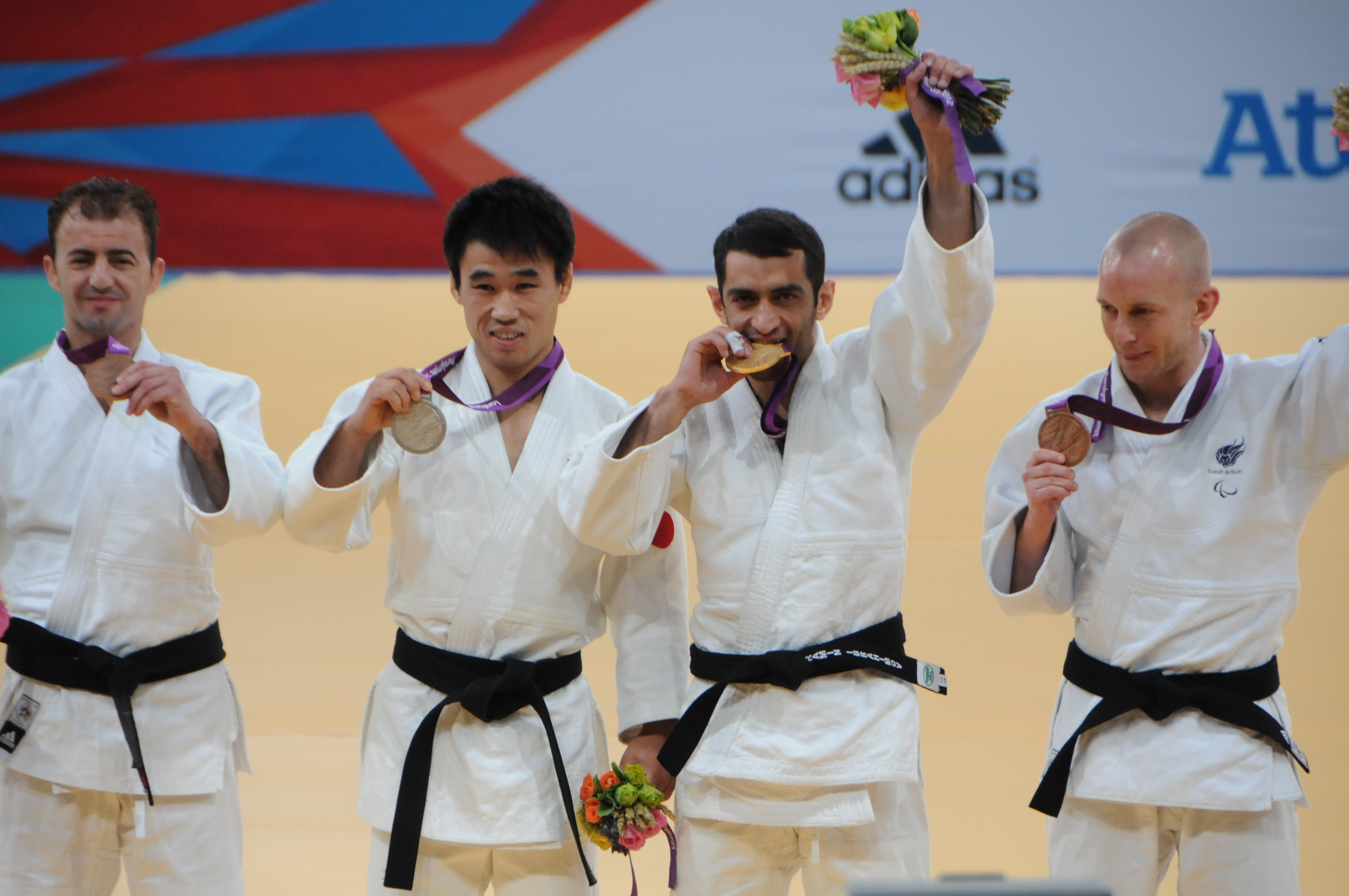
- Awarding ceremony
- Venue: ExCeL London
- Date: 30 August 2012
- Competitors: 8 from 8 nations

Medalists
1st place, gold medalist(s)		Ramin Ibrahimov	Azerbaijan
2nd place, silver medalist(s)		Li Xiaodong	China
3rd place, bronze medalist(s)		Mouloud Noura	Algeria
3rd place, bronze medalist(s)		Ben Quilter	Great Britain

The men's 60 kg judo competition at the 2012 Summer Paralympics was held on 30 August at ExCeL London.

== Results ==
Quarterfinals
Takaaki Hirai (JPN)	101
Juan Castellanos (COL)	0001
Ramin Ibrahimov (AZE)	020
Kevin Villemont (FRA)	0001
Li Xiaodong (CHN)	100
Ronald Hawthorne (USA)	000
Ben Quilter (GBR)	000
Mouloud Noura (ALG)	1021

Semifinals
Takaaki Hirai (JPN)	000
Ramin Ibrahimov (AZE)	0201
Li Xiaodong (CHN)	100
Mouloud Noura (ALG)	000

Final
Ramin Ibrahimov (AZE)	1011
Li Xiaodong (CHN)	000

=== Repechage ===
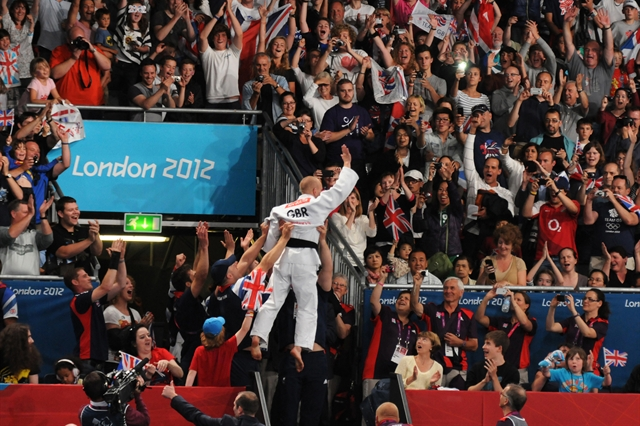
Ben Quilter (GBR) celebrates a victory

Repechage
Justin Karn (CAN)	0004
Min-Jae Lee (KOR)	100
Ronald Hawthorne (USA)	0002
Ben Quilter (GBR)	022

Bronze medal finals
Min-Jae Lee (KOR)	001
Mouloud Noura (ALG)	110
Ben Quilter (GBR)	100
Takaaki Hirai (JPN)	000
