= Romania at the 2026 Winter Paralympics =

- Flag of Romania
- IPC code: ROU
- NPC: Romanian National Paralympic Committee

in Milan & Cortina d'Ampezzo, Italy 6 March 2026 – 15 March 2026
- Competitors: 2 (2 men) in 2 sports
- Medals: Gold 0 Silver 0 Bronze 0 Total 0

Winter Paralympics appearances (overview)
- 2010; 2014; 2018; 2022; 2026

Romania will compete at the 2026 Winter Paralympics in Milan & Cortina d'Ampezzo, Italy, which will take place between 6–15 March 2026.

== Competitors ==
The following is the list of number of competitors participating at the Games per sport/discipline.

Sport	Men	Women	Total
Para alpine skiing	1	0	1
Para snowboard	1	0	1
Total	2	0	2

== Para alpine skiing ==
Athlete	Class	Event	Run 1		Run 2		Total	
Athlete	Class	Event	Time	Rank	Time	Rank	Time	Rank
Andrei-Sorin Popa	LW9–2	Men's slalom, standing	1:07.67	25	1:05.21	22	2:12.88	22

== Para snowboard ==
Banked slalom

Athlete	Event	Run 1	Run 2	Best	Rank
Mihăiţă Papară	Men's banked slalom, SB-LL1	DNF			

Snowboard cross

Athlete	Event	Seeding		1/8 final	Quarterfinal	Semifinal	Final	
Athlete	Event	Time	Rank	Position	Position	Position	Position	Rank
Mihăiţă Papară	Men's snowboard cross, SB-LL1	1:22.89	16	DNS	Did not advance			

== See also ==
- Romania at the Paralympics
- Romania at the 2026 Winter Olympics
