= Uruguay at the 2012 Summer Paralympics =

- IPC code: URU
- NPC: Uruguayan Paralympic Committee

in London
- Competitors: 1 in 1 sport
- Medals: Gold 0 Silver 0 Bronze 0 Total 0

Summer Paralympics appearances (overview)
- 1992; 1996; 2000; 2004; 2008; 2012; 2016; 2020; 2024

Uruguay competed at the 2012 Summer Paralympics in London, United Kingdom, from 29 August to 9 September 2012.

== Swimming ==
Men

Athletes	Event	Heat		Final	
Athletes	Event	Time	Rank	Time	Rank
Gonzalo Dutra	100m backstroke S10	1:11.42	17	did not advance	
Gonzalo Dutra	100m butterfly S10	1:18.01	22	did not advance	

== See also ==
- Uruguay at the 2012 Summer Olympics
