= Romania at the 2018 Winter Paralympics =

- IPC code: ROU
- NPC: National Paralympic Committee

in PyeongChang, South Korea
- Competitors: 1 in 1 sport
- Medals: Gold 0 Silver 0 Bronze 0 Total 0

Winter Paralympics appearances (overview)
- 2010; 2014; 2018; 2022; 2026

Romania sent a competitor to the 2018 Winter Paralympics in Pyeongchang, South Korea. Romania's sole competitor was Mihaita Papară, in para-snowboarding. Romania first went to the Winter Paralympics in 2010. The country has never won a medal at the Winter Games. At the 2010 and 2014 Games, Romania was represented by one skier, Laura Văleanu.

== Team ==
Romania sent only one person to the 2018 Games. The person was Mihaita Papara. He competes in para-snowboarding

The table below contains the list of members of people (called "Team Romania") that participated in the 2018 Games.

Team Romania
Name	Sport	Gender	Classification	Events	ref
Mihaita Papară	para-snowboarding	male			

== Assistance ==
The Romanian National Paralympic Committee has few employees and very little money. Despite this, they try to help all sportspeople with disabilities in Romania. Their 2014 budget was €50,000 for twelve sports. Snowboarding became their thirteenth sport. This happened after Mihaita Papara asked the Committee Chairperson Sally Wood Lamont to support him. In 2016, the budget for the Romanian National Paralympic Committee increased. The year of the Summer Paralympics, their budget was €120,000. In comparison, Croatia had a budget of €1,000,000 in 2015. The money increased because Romanians did well in international competitions. Because the costs to compete are very high, the money was still not enough. There are few sponsors for disabled sportspeople in Romania. The Paralympic Games do not get much media coverage. This makes it very difficult for people in Romania to go to the Games.

== Para-snowboarding ==
=== Snowboarders ===
Papară started snowboarding after a car accident. Snowboarding made his life more normal. It was more like life before his accident. He started using a new knee prosthesis in 2012. It was exhausting. By 2018, things had changed. Papară had participated in a lot more races. He had more experience. His fitness was better. He entered his first international snowboard race in November 2014. Before his first race, a little voice in his head said, "Wait, what you're doing, it's too risky, you're going to hurt yourself, give up!" The prosthetic he uses to snowboard costs €12,000. The Romania Olympic Committee assisted in paying for part of his prosthetic.

Laura Văleanu is Papară's role model. Her amputation is similar to his. She was a skier. She represented Romania at the 2010 Winter Paralympics. Those were the first Winter Paralympics Romania went to. Sport was a passion for her. It assisted in her recovery. Papară tried to do the same as Văleanu. Sport became a way to regain life.

Papară was in a car accident on 3 September 2005. Because of the accident, doctors amputated his leg. After the accident, he tried to live a normal life. He tried to make sure his amputation did not mean he could not do things he wanted to do. He said, "The recovery after such an accident, after an amputation is very difficult and lasting. If I were to give advice to a person in the same situation, I would tell them to start a physical activity, to start sport as soon as possible."

Papară is from Gheorgheni, Harghita. He was born in Harghita.

=== Before the Games ===
In early February, Papară went to a World Cup in Canada. He was in the banked slalom and snowboard cross races. He said it was important people in Romania saw him snowboarding. He thinks it will help change people's mind about what people with disabilities can do. He wants to be a role model for others with disabilities.

=== Schedule and results ===
The snowboard cross event starts on 12 March. It starts at 10:30 AM and goes to 5:00 PM for all classes for both men and women. The slalom race is scheduled to take place on 16 March. It goes from 10:30 AM – 4:55 PM. Men and women in all classes are racing at that time.

== History ==
Romania first went to the Winter Paralympics in 2010. The country has never won a medal at the Winter Games. At the 2010 and 2014 Games, Romania was represented by one skier, Laura Văleanu.
