= Romania at the 2022 Winter Paralympics =

- Flag of Romania
- IPC code: ROU
- NPC: National Paralympic Committee (Romania)
- Website: npc.org.ro

in Beijing, China 4 March 2022 – 13 March 2022
- Competitors: 2 (1 man and 1 woman) in 2 sports
- Flag bearers: Laura Văleanu; Mihăiță Papară
- Medals: Gold 0 Silver 0 Bronze 0 Total 0

Winter Paralympics appearances (overview)
- 2010; 2014; 2018; 2022; 2026

Romania competed at the 2022 Winter Paralympics in Beijing, China which took place between 4–13 March 2022. Two competitors represented Romania, both of whom have represented Romania at the Winter Paralympics in the past: alpine skier Laura Văleanu competed in 2014 and snowboarder Mihăiță Papară competed in 2018.

== Competitors ==
The following is the list of number of competitors participating at the Games per sport/discipline.

| Sport | Men | Women | Total |
|---|---|---|---|
| Alpine skiing | 0 | 1 | 1 |
| Snowboarding | 1 | 0 | 1 |
| Total | 1 | 1 | 2 |

== Alpine skiing ==
One alpine skier competed in alpine skiing.

| Athlete | Event | Run 1 | | Run 2 | | Total | |
| Athlete | Event | Time | Rank | Time | Rank | Time | Rank |
|---|---|---|---|---|---|---|---|
| Laura Văleanu | Women's super-G, standing | —N/a | | | | DSQ | |
| Laura Văleanu | Women's giant slalom, standing | 1:15.25 | 18 | DNS | —N/a | | |

== Snowboarding ==
One snowboarder competed in snowboarding.

Banked slalom

| Athlete | Event | Run 1 | Run 2 | Best | Rank |
|---|---|---|---|---|---|
| Mihăiță Papară | Men's SB-LL1 | 1:24.29 | 1:29.52 | 1:24.29 | 15 |

Snowboard cross

| Athlete | Event | Qualification | | | Quarterfinal | Semifinal | Final |
| Athlete | Event | Run 1 | Run 2 | Rank | Position | Position | Position |
|---|---|---|---|---|---|---|---|
| Mihăiță Papară | Men's SB-LL1 | 1:26.89 | 1:18.98 | 14 Q | 4 | did not advance | |

Qualification legend: Q - Qualify to next round; FA - Qualify to medal final; FB - Qualify to consolation final

== See also ==
- Romania at the Paralympics
- Romania at the 2022 Winter Olympics
