= Uruguay at the 1992 Summer Paralympics =

- IPC code: URU
- NPC: Uruguayan Paralympic Committee

in Barcelona
- Competitors: 2
- Medals Ranked 25th: Gold 5 Silver 4 Bronze 5 Total 14

Summer Paralympics appearances (overview)
- 1992; 1996; 2000; 2004; 2008; 2012; 2016; 2020; 2024

Uruguay competed at the 1992 Summer Paralympics in Barcelona and Madrid, Spain.

At the Barcelona Games, the 2 competitors from Uruguay did not win any medals. medal table.

But in Madrid games, the Uruguayan delegation won 14 medals, 5 of gold, 4 of silver and 5 of bronze, making the best participation of its history. Since then, the country has never won another gold medal in the competition.

== See also ==
- Uruguay at the Paralympics
- Uruguay at the 1992 Summer Olympics
