= Cycling at the 2012 Summer Paralympics – Men's individual pursuit C4 =

Cycling, Men's Ind. Pursuit C4 at the XIV Paralympic Games
- Venue: ExCeL Exhibition Centre
- Dates: 1 September
- Competitors: 14 from 11 nations

Medalists
1st place, gold medalist(s)		Carol-Eduard Novak	Romania
2nd place, silver medalist(s)		Jiří Ježek	Czech Republic
3rd place, bronze medalist(s)		Jody Cundy	Great Britain

The Men's Individual Pursuit C4 track cycling event at the 2012 Summer Paralympics took place on 1 September at London Velopark. The race distance was 4 km.

== Preliminaries ==
Q = Qualifier WR = World Record

Rank	Name	Country	Time
1	Carol-Eduard Novak	Romania	4:40.315 Q WR
2	Jiří Ježek	Czech Republic	4:41.593 Q
3	Jody Cundy	Great Britain	4:42.005 Q
4	Diego German Duenas Gomez	Colombia	4:50.016 Q
5	Roberto Alcaide	Spain	4:51.685
6	Jiri Bouska	Czech Republic	4:55.631
7	Sam Kavanagh	United States	4:58.870
8	Cesar Neira	Spain	5:00.974
9	Masashi Ishii	Japan	5:02.100
10	Ji Xiaofei	China	5:07.453
11	Manfred Gattringer	Austria	5:12.278
12	Damian Lopez Alfonso	Cuba	5:21.172
13	Morten Jahr	Norway	5:21.436
14	Koen Reyserhove	Belgium	5:27.624

== Finals ==
Gold medal match

Name	Time	Rank
Carol-Eduard Novak (ROU)	4:42.000	1st place, gold medalist(s)
Jiří Ježek (CZE)	4:45.232	2nd place, silver medalist(s)

Bronze medal match

Name	Time	Rank
Jody Cundy (GBR)	caught opponent	3rd place, bronze medalist(s)
Diego German Duenas Gomez (COL)		4
