= Alfonsina Maldonado =

Uruguayan equestrian and television personality

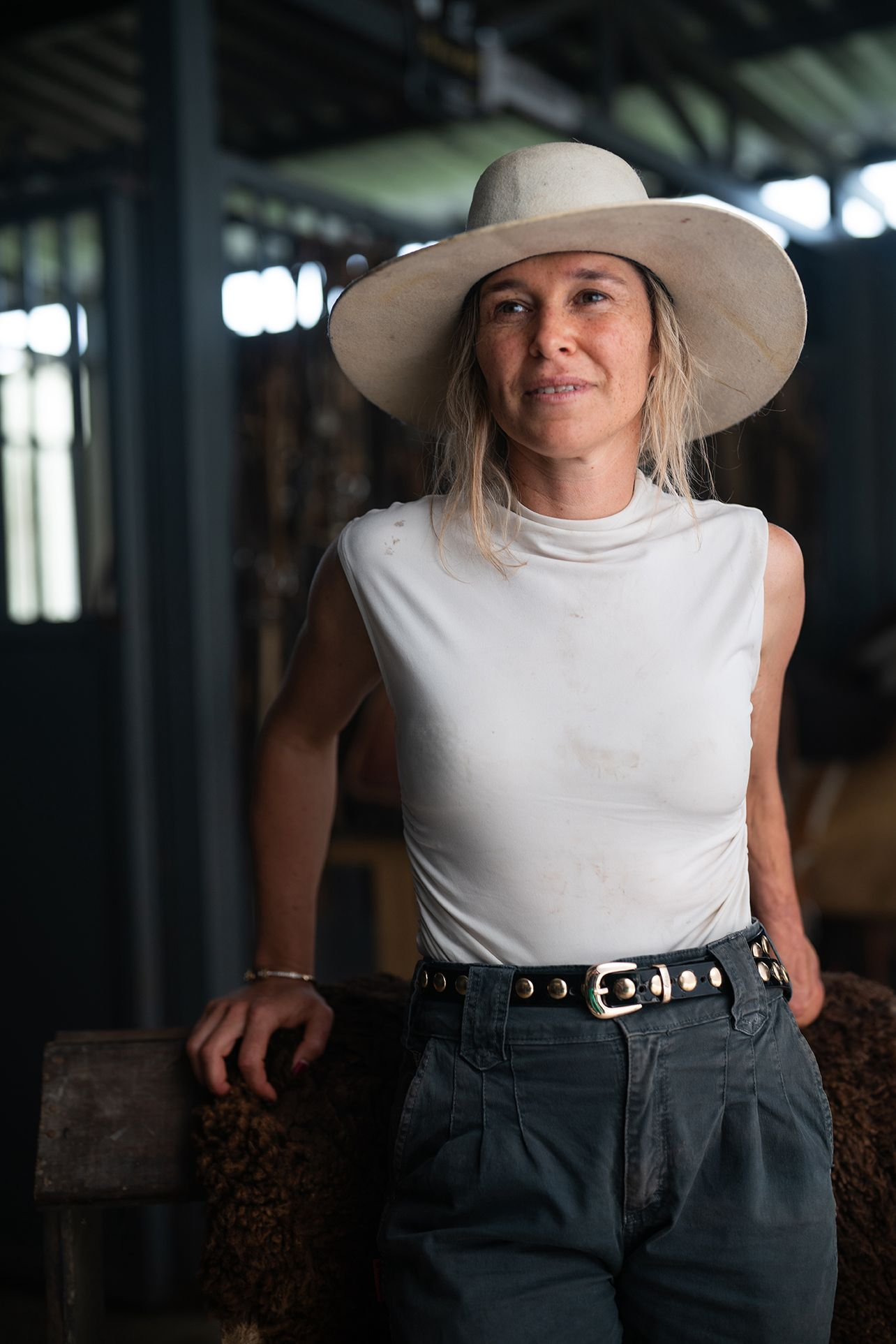
- Alfonsina Maldonado in 2025.
- Born: Alfonsina Maldonado Urse; 9 December 1984 (age 41); Florida, Uruguay
- Occupations: Agricultural technician, amazona, lecturer, personality
- Known for: Fundación Alfonsina Maldoando
- Parent(s): Marisa Urse; Jorge Maldonado
- Website: www.instagram.com/alfonsinamaldonado/?hl=es

Alfonsina Maldonado Urse (born 9 December 1984) is a Uruguayan agricultural technician, equestrian, lecturer and television personality.

== Biography ==
Alfonsina Maldonado is the daughter of Marisa Urse and Jorge Maldonado. At the age of six months, she suffered an accident which left first degree burns on the entire left side of her body. She spent 32 days in a coma and underwent 17 surgeries, resulting in the loss of her left hand. Until age five, she was a patient at the burn unit of the Military Hospital of Montevideo.

She attended School No. 105 Costas de Aria in Florida for her primary education, which she rode to on horseback. She entered the Florida School of Poultry, where she graduated with a degree in agricultural technology. She also took a course at the Uruguayan Army's Riding School to be an equine-assisted therapy instructor.

When Maldonado was 21 years old, she left her country, home, family, and friends to move to Europe. She first lived in Barcelona, where she got a job. She then moved to Yeguada del Lago in Caldes de Malavella, where she worked for five years and met Fandango, a horse with which she tried out for the 2012 Summer Paralympics in London.

Maldonado gives motivational lectures to people who lack an extremity, demonstrating that this is not an impediment to being happy.

In June 2016, she published an autobiographical book titled El desafío de vivir (The Challenge of Living).

== Competition ==
Maldonado tried out for the 2012 London Paralympics as the only Latin American in the Grade IV Grand Prize category. She finished two points short of the minimum score to qualify. She next prepared with another horse, Zig-Zag, to participate in the 2016 Summer Paralympics in Rio de Janeiro. She traveled to the Netherlands for the last qualifying event. In March 2016, she was invited to Rio to compete in dressage. This was her first Paralympic appearance. She finished 8th in the event, with a score of 59.857. She remained positive despite being disappointed with the result.

I did get huge support to get here so my message is that if you dream it you can do whatever you do to reach it. The most important thing is to be a good person and be kind. Here we are real heroes. Not everyone is a real hero but the most important thing is to be a nice person.

== Filmography ==
Year	Title	Role	Format	Notes	Ref.
2020	Celebrity MasterChef	Herself	Competitive reality series	Contestant	
2026	Las Huellas del Fuego	Herself	Documentary film		
