= Romania at the 2010 Winter Paralympics =

- IPC code: ROU
- NPC: National Paralympic Committee

in Vancouver
- Competitors: 1 in 1 sport
- Flag bearer: Laura Valeanu
- Medals: Gold 0 Silver 0 Bronze 0 Total 0

Winter Paralympics appearances (overview)
- 2010; 2014; 2018; 2022; 2026

Romania sent a delegation to compete at the 2010 Winter Paralympics, in Vancouver, Canada. It fielded a single athlete, in alpine skiing. It did not win a medal.

This was Romania's first ever participation in the Winter Paralympics, although it has been participating in the Summer Games since 1972.

== Alpine skiing ==
The following athlete was Romania's sole representative in alpine skiing:

Athlete	Event	Final				
Athlete	Event	Run 1	Run 2	Total Time	Calculated Time	Rank
Laura Valeanu	Women's Slalom - Standing	did not finish				

== See also ==
- Romania at the 2010 Winter Olympics
- Romania at the Paralympics
