= Uruguay at the Paralympics =

- IPC code: URU
- NPC: Uruguayan Paralympic Committee
- Medals: Gold 5 Silver 4 Bronze 6 Total 15

Summer appearances
- 1992; 1996; 2000; 2004; 2008; 2012; 2016; 2020; 2024

Uruguay made its Paralympic Games début at the 1992 Summer Paralympics in Barcelona, sending just two representatives to compete in track and field. The country has competed in every subsequent edition of the Summer Paralympics, but never in the Winter Paralympics. Its delegations have always been small, never consisting in more than three competitors.

The best result in the history of Uruguay at the Paralympic Games was in 1992 when the country won 5 gold, 4 silver and 5 bronze medals at the Paralympic Games for people with mental disabilities in Madrid.

Uruguay also wins a bronze medal, when Jorge Llerena finished in third at the men's 200m sprint (T10 category) in 1996 . Llerena ran the final in 24.28s, behind a Spanish and a British competitor.

== Medallists ==
Medal	Name	Games	Sport	Event
Bronze	Jorge Llerena	(United States) 1996 Atlanta	Athletics	Men's 200 m T10

== See also ==
- Uruguay at the Olympics
