= Athletics at the 1988 Summer Paralympics – Men's 100 metres B1 =

Men's 100 metres B1 at the VIII Paralympic Games
- Paralympic Athletics
- Competitors: 7 from 6 nations

Medalists
1st place, gold medalist(s)		Victor Riabochtan	Soviet Union
2nd place, silver medalist(s)		Sergei Sevastianov	Soviet Union
3rd place, bronze medalist(s)		Yukio Minami	Japan

The Men's 100 metres B1 was a sprinting event in athletics at the 1988 Summer Paralympics in Seoul, for blind athletes. Seven athletes took part, representing six nations. They included defending champion Winford Haynes, of the United States. Haynes was unable to retain his title, outrun by Soviet athletes who were making their Paralympic Games début.

The International Paralympic Committee's database does not record any heats, merely a final round in which the seven athletes took part.

== Results ==
Place	Athlete	Time
1	Victor Riabochtan (URS)	11.86
2	Sergei Sevastianov (URS)	11.89
3	Yukio Minami (JPN)	11.92
4	Winford Haynes (USA)	12.09
5	Yvan Bourdeau (CAN)	12.12
6	Zbigniew Kubacki (POL)	12.18
7	Clavno Costa (ITA)	12.37
