= Romania at the 2014 Winter Paralympics =

- IPC code: ROU
- NPC: National Paralympic Committee

in Sochi
- Competitors: 1 in 1 sport
- Medals: Gold 0 Silver 0 Bronze 0 Total 0

Winter Paralympics appearances (overview)
- 2010; 2014; 2018; 2022; 2026

Romania competed at the 2014 Winter Paralympics in Sochi, Russia, held between 7–16 March 2014. This was Romania's second appearance at a Winter Paralympic Games. The Romanian delegation consisted of one alpine skier, Laura Valeanu, who finished fifth in the slalom and seventh in the giant slalom.

== Background ==
Romania first participated in Paralympic competition at the 1972 Summer Paralympics in Heidelberg, Germany, but did not make another appearance until the 1996 Summer Paralympics in Atlanta. Their only prior appearance at the Winter Paralympics was four years prior, at the 2010 Vancouver Paralympics. Although the nation has won medals at the Summer Paralympics, they have yet to win a medal at the Winter Paralympics. The 2014 Winter Paralympics were held from 7–16 March 2014, in Sochi, Russia; 45 countries and 547 athletes took part in the multi-sport event. Laura Valeanu was selected as the only athletes in the Romanian delegation to Sochi. She was chosen as the Romanian flag bearer for the parade of nations during the opening ceremony and for the closing ceremony.

== Disability classification ==
Every participant at the Paralympics has their disability grouped into one of five disability categories; amputation, the condition may be congenital or sustained through injury or illness; cerebral palsy; wheelchair athletes, there is often overlap between this and other categories; visual impairment, including blindness; and Les Autres, any physical disability that does not fall strictly under one of the other categories, for example dwarfism or multiple sclerosis. Each Paralympic sport then has its own classifications, dependent upon the specific physical demands of competition. Events are given a code, made of numbers and letters, describing the type of event and classification of the athletes competing. Events with "B" in the code are for athletes with visual impairment, codes LW1 to LW9 are for athletes who stand to compete and LW10 to LW12 are for athletes who compete sitting down. Alpine skiing events grouped athletes into separate competitions for sitting, standing and visually impaired athletes.

== Alpine skiing ==
Laura Valeanu was 24 years old at the time of the Sochi Paralympics. She had previously represented Romania at the 2010 Winter Paralympics. Valeanu was injured in a motorcycle accident in 2006, and her right leg was amputated below the knee. She is classified as LW4, and therefore competes in a standing position. An LW4 is explained by the International Paralympic Committee as "Similar to skiers in Sport Class LW 2, LW 4 skiers have an impairment in one leg only, but with less Activity Limitation. A typical example is a below knee amputation in one leg. They will use two skis during the race." LW2's, on the other hand, use only one ski. On 12 March, she competed in the standing slalom, and posted run times of one minute and five seconds and one minute and four seconds. Her combined time of two minutes and 10 seconds saw her in fifth place, and a mere three seconds off the bronze medal time; the gold medal was won by Andrea Rothfuss of Germany. On 16 March she took part in the standing giant slalom, and completed the course in times of 1 minute and 33 seconds and 1 minute and 20 seconds. Her combined time was 2 minutes and 54 seconds, which put her in 7th place out of 15 competitors who finished both runs of the course; Marie Bochet of France won the gold medal.

Athlete	Event	Run 1			Run 2			Final/Total		
Athlete	Event	Time	Diff	Rank	Time	Diff	Rank	Time	Diff	Rank
Laura Valeanu	Slalom, standing	1:05.42	+6.05	6	1:04.71	+4.23	4	2:10.13	+10.28	5
Laura Valeanu	Giant slalom, standing	1:33.96	+8.98	11	1:20.27	+6.41	8	2:54.23	+15.39	7

== See also ==
- Romania at the Paralympics
- Romania at the 2014 Winter Olympics
