= 2007 European Cadet Judo Championships =

Judo competition

Judo 2007 European Cadet Judo Championships
- Location: Valletta, Malta
- Dates: 6–8 July 2007

Competition at external databases
- Links: JudoInside

The 2007 European Cadet Judo Championships is an edition of the European Cadet Judo Championships, organised by the International Judo Federation. It was held in Valletta, Malta from 6 to 8 July 2007.

== Medal summary ==
=== Medal table ===
* Host nation (Malta)

Rank	Nation	Gold	Silver	Bronze	Total
1	Russia (RUS)	4	2	5	11
2	Turkey (TUR)	2	1	1	4
3	Ukraine (UKR)	1	3	6	10
4	Azerbaijan (AZE)	1	2	0	3
5	Georgia (GEO)	1	1	3	5
6	Germany (GER)	1	0	5	6
7	France (FRA)	1	0	2	3
8	Hungary (HUN)	1	0	1	2
8	Italy (ITA)	1	0	1	2
10	Croatia (CRO)	1	0	0	1
10	Estonia (EST)	1	0	0	1
10	Israel (ISR)	1	0	0	1
13	Netherlands (NED)	0	3	1	4
14	Belarus (BLR)	0	1	0	1
14	Bulgaria (BUL)	0	1	0	1
14	Poland (POL)	0	1	0	1
14	Serbia (SRB)	0	1	0	1
18	Slovenia (SLO)	0	0	2	2
19	Armenia (ARM)	0	0	1	1
19	Austria (AUT)	0	0	1	1
19	Finland (FIN)	0	0	1	1
19	Greece (GRE)	0	0	1	1
19	Romania (ROU)	0	0	1	1
Totals (23 entries)		16	16	32	64

=== Men's events ===
Event	Gold	Silver	Bronze
−50 kg	Tommy Arshansky (ISR)	Vugar Shirinli (AZE)	Otar Kaidarashvili (GEO)
−50 kg	Tommy Arshansky (ISR)	Vugar Shirinli (AZE)	Danny-Paul Kiel (GER)
−55 kg	Roman Paskar (UKR)	Elsever Sadigzade (AZE)	Artur Kostoev (RUS)
−55 kg	Roman Paskar (UKR)	Elsever Sadigzade (AZE)	Enrico Parlati (ITA)
−60 kg	Sarkhan Ahmadov (AZE)	Zviad Kapanadze (GEO)	Jean-Christophe Lamy (FRA)
−60 kg	Sarkhan Ahmadov (AZE)	Zviad Kapanadze (GEO)	Florin Timis (ROU)
−66 kg	Zebeda Rekhviashvili (GEO)	Artem Bulyga (UKR)	Márton Kovács (HUN)
−66 kg	Zebeda Rekhviashvili (GEO)	Artem Bulyga (UKR)	Elim Kitaev (RUS)
−73 kg	Tanju Sorli (TUR)	Stanislav Kalbasau (BLR)	Samuli Havas (FIN)
−73 kg	Tanju Sorli (TUR)	Stanislav Kalbasau (BLR)	Giorgi Mermanishvili (GEO)
−81 kg	Grigori Minaškin (EST)	Magomed Magomedov (RUS)	Gudo Slotboom (NED)
−81 kg	Grigori Minaškin (EST)	Magomed Magomedov (RUS)	Vyacheslav Menchakov (UKR)
−90 kg	Shamil Magomedov (RUS)	Feyyaz Yazıcı (TUR)	Maximilian Schaupp (GER)
−90 kg	Shamil Magomedov (RUS)	Feyyaz Yazıcı (TUR)	Gor Khorodyan (ARM)
+90 kg	Levent Weiß (GER)	Janko Raicic (SRB)	David Abaev (RUS)
+90 kg	Levent Weiß (GER)	Janko Raicic (SRB)	Vaja Dabrundashvili (GEO)

=== Women's events ===
Event	Gold	Silver	Bronze
−40 kg	Ekaterina Teterina (RUS)	Nadezhda Kretova (UKR)	Katharina Taferner (AUT)
−40 kg	Ekaterina Teterina (RUS)	Nadezhda Kretova (UKR)	Ebru Sahin (TUR)
−44 kg	Tuğba Zehir (TUR)	Alesya Kuznetsova (RUS)	Sonja Wirth (GER)
−44 kg	Tuğba Zehir (TUR)	Alesya Kuznetsova (RUS)	Oleksandra Starkova (UKR)
−48 kg	Barbara Maros (HUN)	Maryna Krot (UKR)	Kathrin Prill (GER)
−48 kg	Barbara Maros (HUN)	Maryna Krot (UKR)	Pari Surakatova (RUS)
−52 kg	Andrea Bekic (CRO)	Maureen Groefsema (NED)	Eteri Sekhniashvili (RUS)
−52 kg	Andrea Bekic (CRO)	Maureen Groefsema (NED)	Maryna Murashko (UKR)
−57 kg	Ekaterina Valkova (RUS)	Ivelina Ilieva (BUL)	Olga Milokumova (UKR)
−57 kg	Ekaterina Valkova (RUS)	Ivelina Ilieva (BUL)	Katja Senekovic (SLO)
−63 kg	Daria Davydova (RUS)	Maria Anderwald (POL)	Caroline Peschaud (FRA)
−63 kg	Daria Davydova (RUS)	Maria Anderwald (POL)	Nina Milošević (SLO)
−70 kg	Marta Ferrari (ITA)	Kim Polling (NED)	Olena Petrechenko (UKR)
−70 kg	Marta Ferrari (ITA)	Kim Polling (NED)	Tia Berger (GER)
+70 kg	Marie Del Puppo (FRA)	Janine Penders (NED)	Elpida Aslanidou (GRE)
+70 kg	Marie Del Puppo (FRA)	Janine Penders (NED)	Iryna Kindzerska (UKR)

Source Results
