= Anuar Sariyev =

Kazakhstani Paralympic judoka (born 1992)

Personal information
- Born: 4 February 1992 (age 34)
- Occupation: Judoka

Sport
- Country: Kazakhstan
- Sport: Para judo
Medal record
Paralympic Games
Silver medal – second place	2020 Tokyo	60 kg
Asian Para Games
Bronze medal – third place	2018 Jakarta	Team
Bronze medal – third place	2022 Hangzhou	60 kg
IBSA Asian Championships
Silver medal – second place	2017 Atyrau	60 kg
IBSA World Games
Bronze medal – third place	2015 Seoul	60 kg

Profile at external databases
- JudoInside.com: 99606

Anuar Sariyev (born 4 February 1992) is a Kazakhstani Paralympic judoka.

== Career ==
He competed in the men's 60 kg event at the 2016 Summer Paralympics held in Rio de Janeiro, Brazil. He won a silver medal in the men's 60 kg event at the 2020 Summer Paralympics held in Tokyo, Japan.
