= Firmino Baptista =

Portuguese Paralympic athlete

Medal record

Track and field (athletics)

Representing Portugal

Paralympic Games
Silver medal – second place	2000 Sydney	200m T11

IPC Athletics European Championships
Silver medal – second place	2012 Stadskanaal	100m T11
Silver medal – second place	2012 Stadskanaal	4x100m relay T11-13
Silver medal – second place	2016 Grosseto	4x100m relay T11-13
Bronze medal – third place	2016 Grosseto	200m T11

Firmino Baptista is a paralympic athlete from Portugal competing mainly in category T11 sprint events.

Baptista competed in his first Paralympics in 2000 where he ran in the 100m and 200m, winning a silver medal in the 200m. He also competed in the following two Paralympics in 2004 and 2008 but despite competing in the 100m, 200m and the 4 × 100 m was unable to win any further medals.
