= Ramin Ibrahimov =

Azerbaijani paralympic judoka

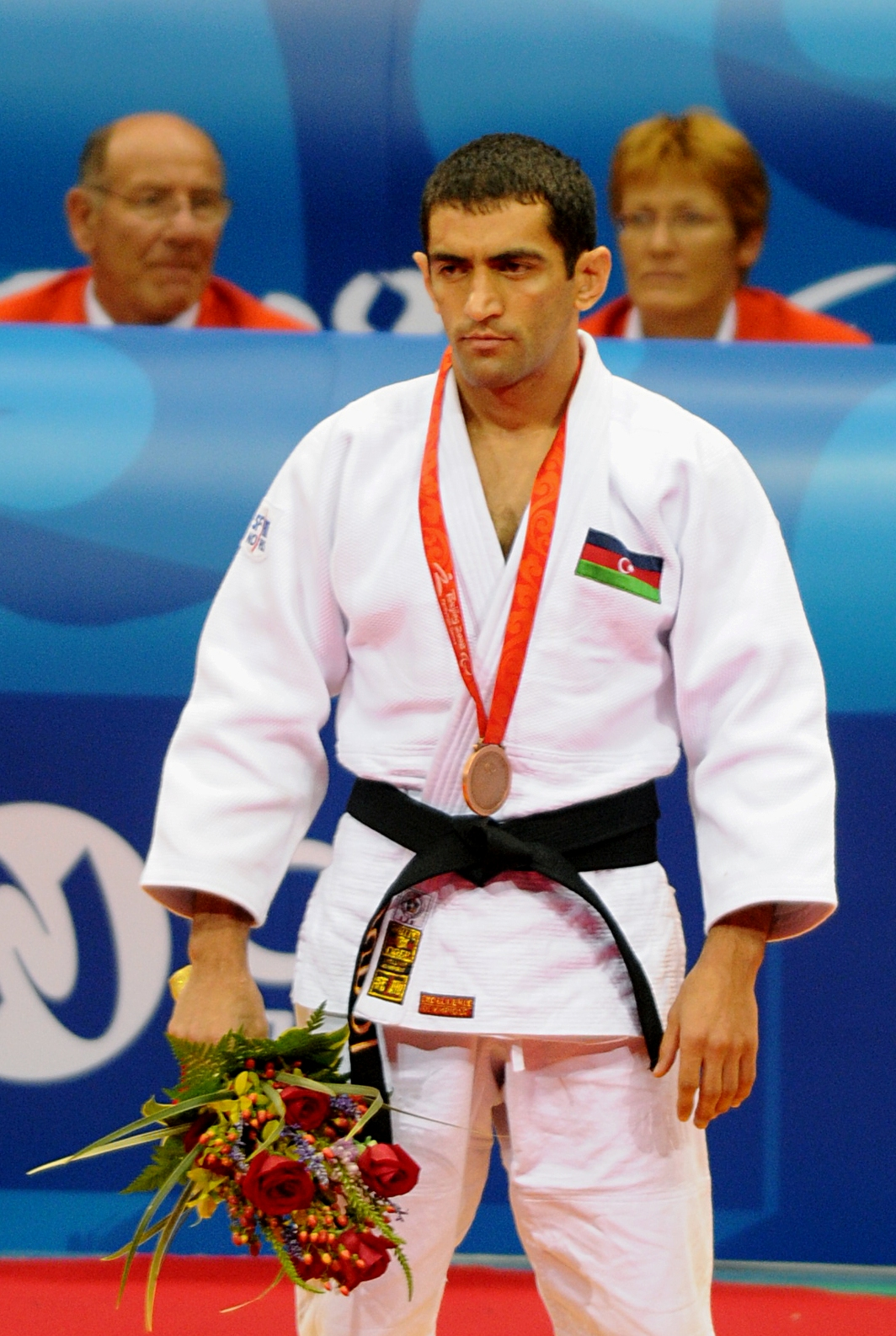

Personal information
- Born: 2 July 1978 (age 47)
- Occupation: Judoka

Sport
- Sport: Judo
Medal record
Men's judo
Representing Azerbaijan
Paralympic Games
Gold medal – first place	2012 London	60 kg
Bronze medal – third place	2008 Beijing	60 kg
World Championships
Bronze medal – third place	2010 Antalya	60 kg
Bronze medal – third place	2011 Antalya	60 kg
European Championships
Gold medal – first place	2007 Baku	60 kg
Gold medal – first place	2009 Debrecen	60 kg
Silver medal – second place	2015 Odivelas	60 kg

Profile at external databases
- JudoInside.com: 89769

Ramin Ibrahimov (born 2 July 1978) is a visually impaired Paralympic judoka of Azerbaijan. In 2011 he received the Tereggi Medal by the Azerbaijani President. At the 2012 Summer Paralympics he won a gold medal.
