= Petr Novák (athlete) =

Czech Paralympic athlete (born 1975)

Personal information
- Born: 31 March 1975 (age 51)
Medal record
Paralympic athletics
Representing Czech Republic
Paralympic Games
Silver medal – second place	2000 Sydney	100 metres - T11

Petr Novák (born 31 March 1975) is a Czech paralympic athlete, competing mainly in category T11 sprint events.

Novák competed in the 100m and 200m at both the 1996 and 2000 Summer Paralympics, winning the silver medal in the 100m in 2000.
