= Enrique Sánchez-Guijo =

Spanish Paralympic athlete

Medal record

Track and field (athletics)

Representing Spain

Paralympic Games
Gold medal – first place	1992 Barcelona	4x400 metre relay - B1-B3
Gold medal – first place	1996 Atlanta	4x100 metre relay - T10-12
Gold medal – first place	1996 Atlanta	4x400 metre relay - T10-12
Gold medal – first place	2000 Sydney	200 metres - T11
Bronze medal – third place	2000 Sydney	4x100 metre relay - T13

Enrique Sánchez-Guijo is a paralympic athlete from Spain competing mainly in category T11 sprint events.

Sánchez has competed in three Paralympics, firstly in 1992 Summer Paralympics in his home country whereas in well as competing in the 200m, 400m and 800m he was a part of the victorious 4 × 400 m relay team. At the following games in 1996 he again competed in the 100m, 200m and 400m, but it was as part of the Spanish relay teams that he won medals, gold in the 4 × 100 m and 4 × 400 m. It was in 2000 Summer Paralympics that he won his first individual medal, a gold medal in the T11 200m while he also ran as part of the bronze medal-winning 4 × 100 m relay team.
