= Koji Saito (athlete) =

Japanese Paralympic athlete

Medal record

Track and field (athletics)

Representing Japan

Paralympic Games
Silver medal – second place	2000 Sydney	4x100 metre relay - T13

Koji Saito (斉藤 晃司, Saitō Kōji) is a paralympic athlete from Japan competing mainly in category T11 sprint events.

Koji competed in the 100m and 4 × 100 m in the 2000 Summer Paralympics winning a silver medal with his teammates in the 4 × 100 m. He also competed in the 100m and 200m in 2004 but was unable to medal in either event.
