= Camelia Ciripan =

Romanian para table tennis player

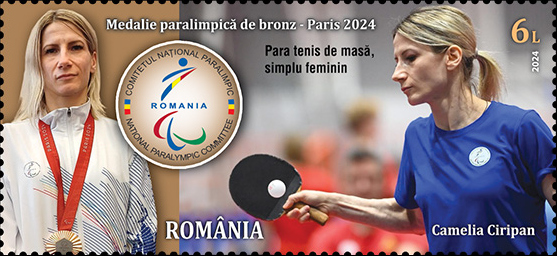
- Ciripan at the 2024 olympics

Personal information
- Born: 16 November 1978 (age 47)
- Home town: Bucharest, Romania

Sport
- Sport: Para table tennis
- Disability class: C6
Medal record
Para table tennis
Representing Romania
Paralympic Games
Bronze medal – third place	2024 Paris	Singles C6

Camelia Ciripan (born 16 November 1978) is a Romanian para table tennis player. She represented Romania at the 2024 Summer Paralympics.

== Career ==
Ciripan represented Romania at the 2024 Summer Paralympics and won a bronze medal in the singles C6 event.
