= Uruguay at the 2000 Summer Paralympics =

- IPC code: URU
- NPC: Uruguayan Paralympic Committee

in Sydney
- Medals: Gold 0 Silver 0 Bronze 0 Total 0

Summer Paralympics appearances (overview)
- 1992; 1996; 2000; 2004; 2008; 2012; 2016; 2020; 2024

During the 2000 Paralympics, one female athlete and one male athlete represented Uruguay at the 2000 Summer Paralympics in Sydney. Uruguay did not win any medals during the 2000 Paralympics.

== See also ==
- 2000 Summer Paralympics

== Bibliography ==
- International Paralympic Committee (2000). "Appendix C: Athlete Numbers - By Delegation". Sydney 2000 Paralympic Games Post Games Report. Sydney.
