= Lorenzo Ricci (athlete) =

Italian Paralympic athlete (born 1971)

Medal record

Men's para athletics

Representing Italy

Paralympic Games
Gold medal – first place	2000 Sydney	100 metres - T11
Gold medal – first place	2000 Sydney	4x100 metre relay - T13

Lorenzo Ricci (born 13 May 1971 in Sarzana) is a Paralympic athlete from Italy competing mainly in category T11 sprint events.

Lorenzo competed in the 100m and 200m at both the 2000 and 2004 Summer Paralympics winning a gold medal in the T11 100m in 2000. He also won a gold as part of the Italian 4 × 100 m for T13 in 2004.
