= Recep Çiftçi =

Turkish Paralympic judoka

Personal information
- Born: 30 March 1995 (age 31)
- Occupation: Judoka

Sport
- Country: Turkey
- Sport: Paralympic judo
Medal record
Paralympic Games
Bronze medal – third place	2020 Tokyo	60 kg
IBSA European Championships
Silver medal – second place	2019 Genoa	60 kg
Bronze medal – third place	2015 Lisbon	60 kg
Bronze medal – third place	2017 Walsall	60 kg

Profile at external databases
- IJF: 64908
- JudoInside.com: 101353

Recep Çiftçi (born 30 March 1995) is a Turkish Paralympic judoka. He is visually impaired. He won one of the bronze medals in the men's 60 kg event at the 2020 Summer Paralympics held in Tokyo, Japan.
