= Ben Quilter =

British Paralympic judoka (born 1981)

Personal information
- Born: 8 October 1981 (age 44)
- Occupation: Judoka

Sport
- Sport: Para judo
Medal record
Men's judo
Representing Great Britain
Paralympic Games
Bronze medal – third place	2012 London	60 kg

Profile at external databases
- JudoInside.com: 61331

Ben Quilter (born 8 October 1981) is a British paralympic judoka. He represented Great Britain at the 2008 Summer Paralympics and the 2012 Summer Paralympics.

Born in Brighton, Quilter is visually impaired after developing Stargardt disease in 1992. In 2012 at the 2012 Summer Paralympics, he won a bronze medal in the under 60 kg men's category.

== See also ==
- Judo in the United Kingdom
