= Pediatric plastic surgery =

Pediatric plastic surgery is plastic surgery performed on children. Its procedures are predominantly conducted for reconstructive purposes, although some cosmetic procedures are performed on children as well. In children, the line between cosmetic and reconstructive surgery is often blurred, as many congenital deformities impair physical function as well as aesthetics.

Children make up roughly 3% of all plastic surgery procedures, and the majority of these procedures correct a congenital deformity. Cleft lip, syndactyly, and polydactyly are among the most common conditions treated with pediatric reconstructive surgery. Common pediatric cosmetic procedures include breast augmentation or reduction, auricular reconstruction, and rhinoplasty.

== Reconstructive plastic surgery ==
Reconstructive plastic surgery is performed on abnormal structures of the body that are the result of congenital defects, developmental abnormalities, trauma, infection, tumors or disease. While reconstructive surgery is most often undertaken to regain normal motor function or prevent current or future health problems, aesthetics is also considered by the surgical team.

Several of the most common congenital birth defects can be treated by a plastic surgeon operating as an individual, or as a part of a multi-disciplinary team. The most common pediatric birth defects requiring plastic surgeon involvement include:

- Cleft lip and/or palate - Babies born with the defect will have opening in the vicinity of the upper lip. The size of the opening reaches anywhere from a small notch to near towards the base of the nostril, in which it would either involve one or both sides of the lip. Worldwide, clefts are estimated to affect 1 in every 700-1000 live births. Roughly 25% of cleft lip and palate cases are inherited from parents, with the other 75% believed to be the cause of a combination of lifestyle and chance factors.
- Syndactyly / Polydactyly – The most common of congenital malformations affecting limbs. It is believed that Syndactyly, exhibits in variation, in which digits can be fused either partially or across its entire length, or as simple as only being connected superficially by skin. It affects 1 in every 2,000 – 3,000 live births. Polydactyly is the presence of extra fingers or toes at birth, and is believed to affect somewhere around 2 out of every 1,000 live births. However, it is believed that many cases are so minor that they are taken care of shortly after birth and not reported, so actual statistics may be higher.
- Positional Plagiocephaly – IN 1992, to decrease the incidence of SIDS, the American Academy of Pediatrics initiated the "Back to Sleep" campaign, which recommended that babies be put to sleep on their backs. While this almost halved the number of SIDS deaths, the campaign appeared to also help raise plagiocephaly incidence fivefold, to roughly one in sixty live births. Plagiocephaly is simply the flattening of one area of the skull, generally one babies tend to favor as they lie. While treatment is often as simply as repositioning the baby during sleep, in more pronounced cases helmet therapy may be put to use. In most cases, plagiocephaly is quite minor and easily resolved, with many more pediatric plastic surgeons becoming familiar with helmet therapy for more advanced cases.
- Craniosynostosis – Much less common, but potentially much more serious than plagiocephaly is craniosynostosis. Craniosynostosis is a congenital abnormality originating from the central nervous system in which one or more of the fibrous joints in the skull close prematurely. This fusion often requires surgical intervention to reconstruct the skull (see craniofacial surgery) either to bring it back to its normal position or to give it a more natural shape. It is believed that craniosynostosis occurs in 1 out of 1,800 to 2,200 live births, and is often a side effect of an associated syndrome.

== Cosmetic plastic surgery ==
Cosmetic plastic surgery is defined as a surgical procedure undertaken to improve the physical appearance and self-esteem of a patient. These procedures are usually elective.

While the majority of pediatric plastic surgery procedures done are reconstructive; there are those performed for cosmetic purposes. The most common procedures done for cosmetic benefit in children include:

- Breast augmentation
- Male breast reduction
- Ear surgery as a result of microtia
- Rhinoplasty

Out of all procedures, nose reshaping generally has the most cases on an annual basis (4,313 procedures in 1996). However, children make up only 9% of the total caseload for all nose reshaping. On the opposite end of the spectrum, children requiring ear surgery accounted for 2,470 procedures in 1996, a total of 34% of all total ear surgeries.

While many of these procedures are done for purely cosmetic benefit, many plastic surgeons work on these features (giving them a more normal appearance), while performing a surgery to improve function as the result of a congenital deformity.

== Multi-disciplinary emphasis ==
With the unique challenges created in the field of plastic surgery, an increasingly popular trend has been to utilize the multi-disciplinary team approach in treatment.

Common conditions involving team treatment include:

- Breast problems - Includes gynecomastia (male breast development), macromastia (excessively large breasts), tuberous defects, and breast asymmetry. Often, children with breast conditions develop physical problems, as well as psychological side effects. With this knowledge, current multi-disciplinary clinics have arisen including specialists from plastic surgery, nutrition, adolescent medicine, psychology, gynecology, and social work.
- Head, Neck, and Skullbase Tumors – Includes angiofibroma, desmoid tumors, fibrosarcomas, hemangiomas, lymphomas and lymphatic malformations, and neuroblastoma. While the bulk of procedures may be left up to neurosurgeons, otolaryngology, and maxillofacial surgery, a multidisaplinary approach is also crucial to minimize scars and maintain a somewhat normal shape and function.
- Cleft lip and palate – In cleft lip and palate cases, not are there only hampering physical side effects manifested in the under developed lip and palate, there are also a host of other potential complications. For this reason, CLP children are cared for by a team that may include plastic surgeons or oral and maxillofacial surgeons, speech pathologists, audiologists, dentists, orthodontists, and genetics professionals if there is an associated syndrome.
- Craniofacial anomalies - Includes craniosynostosis, plagiocephaly, and syndromes associated with these defects. In cases of craniosynostosis where surgical intervention is necessary, the involvement of a team of multi-disciplinary professionals is of utmost importance. Team members often come from departments of plastic surgery, oral and maxillofacial surgery, neurosurgery, audiology, dentistry, orthodontics, and speech and language pathology. These professionals often assist not only in operational procedures, but in developing coordinated care plans for the child throughout their life.
- Vascular anomalies – vascular malformations, hemangiomas, and rare vascular tumors. Not only do vascular anomalies have often prominent interior bodily effects; they manifest themselves physically as well. For this reason, the involvement of multiple specialties in coordinating care is of utmost importance. Specialists involve in vascular anomalies and hemangioma care often hail from the disciplines of general surgery, vascular anomalies research, plastic surgery, dermatology, cardiology, hematology/oncology, neurology/neurosurgery, maxillofacial surgery, and otolaryngology. The child needs treatment not only to minimize the physical side effects of a hemangioma or vascular anomalies, but also help in finding out why the tumor is present (if it is in fact a tumor), and developing a course of treatment if necessary.
