= Sherzod Namozov =

Uzbekistani Paralympic judoka

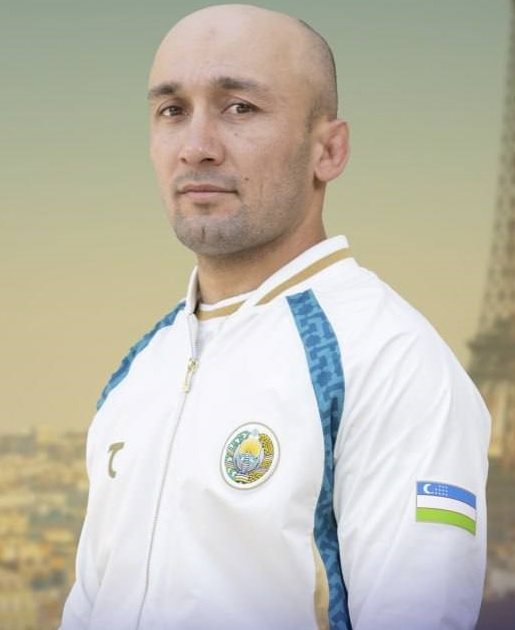

Personal information
- Born: 3 August 1992 (age 33)
- Occupation: Judoka

Sport
- Country: Uzbekistan
- Sport: Para judo
- Disability class: J2
- Weight class: −60 kg
Medal record
Men's para judo
Representing Uzbekistan
Paralympic Games
Gold medal – first place	2016 Rio de Janeiro	60 kg
Gold medal – first place	2024 Paris	60 kg J2
Asian Para Games
Gold medal – first place	2014 Incheon	60 kg
Gold medal – first place	2018 Jakarta	60 kg
Silver medal – second place	2022 Hangzhou	60 kg
Bronze medal – third place	2018 Jakarta	Team

Profile at external databases
- JudoInside.com: 99600

Sherzod Namozov (born 3 August 1992) is a visually impaired Uzbekistani Paralympic judoka. He won a gold medal at the 2016 Summer Paralympics and 2024 Summer Paralympics in the men's 60 kg Category.
