= Makoto Hirose =

Japanese judoka

Personal information
- Born: 22 November 1976 (age 49)

Sport
- Country: Japan
- Sport: Paralympic judo
Medal record
Men's judo
Representing Japan
Paralympic Games
Silver medal – second place	2004 Athens	60 kg
Silver medal – second place	2016 Rio de Janeiro	60 kg
Asian Para Games
Bronze medal – third place	2010 Guangzhou	-66 kg

Makoto Hirose (廣瀬 誠, Hirose Makoto; born 22 November 1976) is a Japanese Paralympic judoka in Lightweight.

In 2004 he won the silver medal in the men's 60 kg, but was not upgraded when Sergio Arturo Perez was stripped of his gold medal after testing positive for a banned substance. In 2008 he made it to the quarter-finals but lost to Mouloud Noura (Algeria). In 2012 he switched to 66 kg (half-lightweight) and lost the semi-final to Zhao Xu (China). The 2016 Summer Paralympics in Rio will be his fourth Games. In the 60 kg, he won his second silver medal when Sherzod Namozov (Uzbekistan) beat him in the final.

At the 2010 Asian Para Games he won a bronze medal in the men's -66 kg event.
