= José Gameiro =

Portuguese Paralympic athlete

Medal record

Men's para athletics

Representing Portugal

Paralympic Games
Gold medal – first place	2000 Sydney	4x400m T13

World Championships
Bronze medal – third place	2002 Villeneuve d'Ascq	4x400 m T11-13

Jose Gameiro is a Paralympic athlete from Portugal competing mainly in category T11 sprint events.

He competed in the 2000 Summer Paralympics in Sydney, Australia. There he went out in the first round of the men's 200 metres T11 event, went out in the quarter-finals of the men's 400 metres T11 event, and earned a gold medal in the 4 x 400 metres relay T13 event. Gameiro also competed at the 2002 and 2006 IPC Athletics World Championships in Villeneuve d'Ascq, France, and Assen, Netherlands. There, in the men's 4 x 400 metres relay T11-13 events, he earned a bronze medal in 2002 and finished 4th in 2006.
