= Mouloud Noura =

Algerian Paralympic judoka

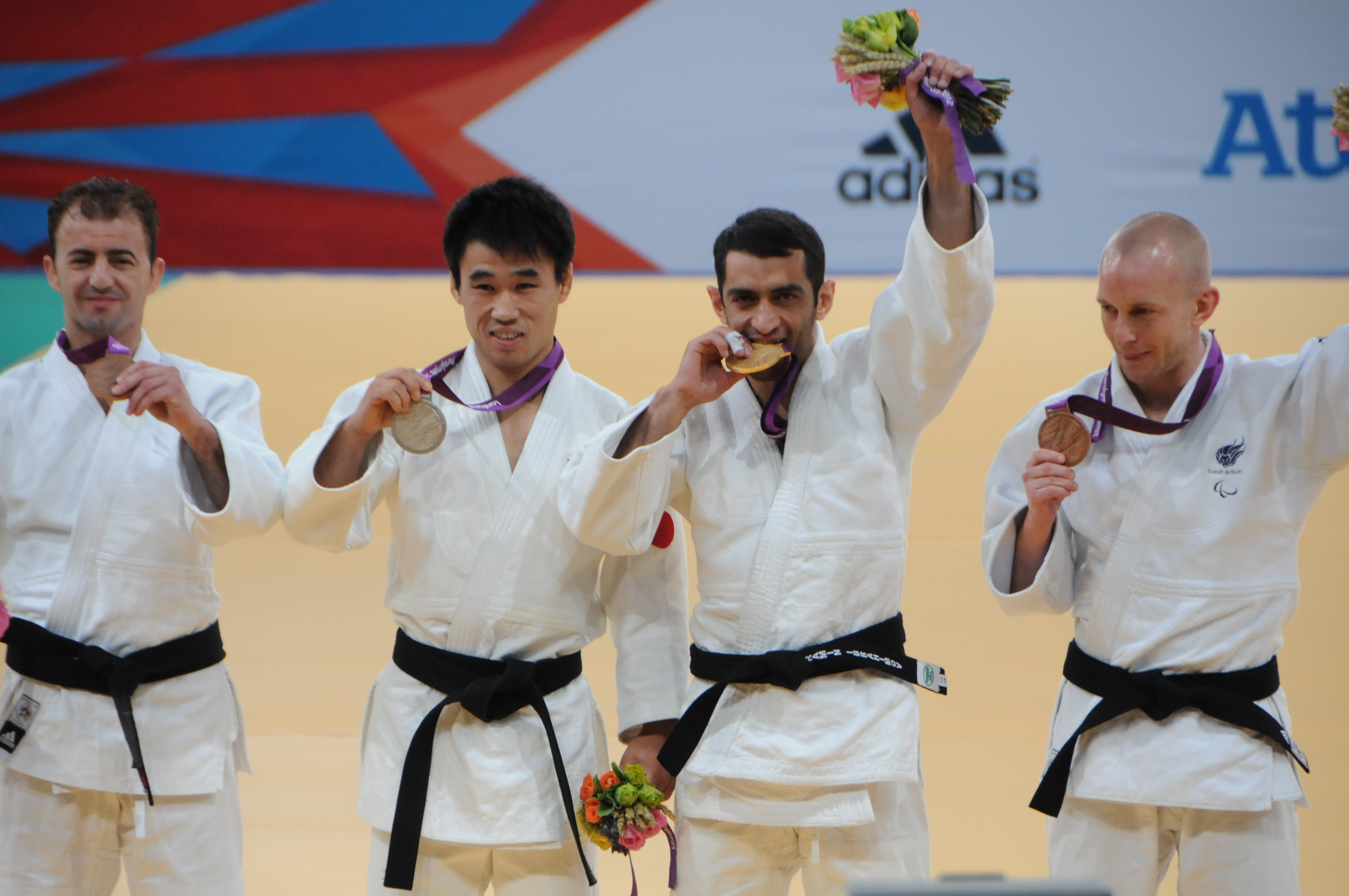
- Mouloud Noura (2012, far left)

Personal information
- Born: 30 December 1982 (age 43)
- Occupation: Judoka

Sport
- Country: Algeria
- Sport: Paralympic judo
- Weight class: 60 kg
Medal record
Paralympic Games
Gold medal – first place	2008 Beijing	60 kg
Bronze medal – third place	2012 London	60 kg

Profile at external databases
- JudoInside.com: 89825

Mouloud Noura (born 30 December 1982) is an Algerian Paralympic judoka. He represented Algeria at the 2008 Summer Paralympics, at the 2012 Summer Paralympics and at the 2016 Summer Paralympics. He won two medals: the gold medal in the men's 60 kg event in 2008 and one of the bronze medals in the men's 60 kg event in 2012.
