= Norbert Bíró =

Hungarian Paralympic judoka

Personal information
- Born: 5 March 1974 (age 52) Cegléd, Hungary

Sport
- Country: Hungary
- Sport: Paralympic judo
- Disability: Glaucoma
Medal record
Paralympic judo
Representing Hungary
Paralympic Games
Bronze medal – third place	2004 Athens	Men's -60kg
IBSA European Judo Championships
Gold medal – first place	1999 Deols	Men's -60kg
Silver medal – second place	2005 Vlaardingen	Men's -60kg

Norbert Bíró (born 5 March 1974) is a retired Hungarian Paralympic judoka. He was a bronze medalist at the 2004 Summer Paralympics in Athens and won the European Championship in 1999. He now coaches the Hungarian Youth Judo Team and has coached 2018 Summer Youth Olympics bronze medalist Zsombor Vég and gold medalist Szofi Özbas. His older brother Tamás Bíró is also a judo coach for the Youth Team.
