= Júlio Requena =

Spanish Paralympic athlete

Medal record

Track and field (athletics)

Representing Spain

Paralympic Games
Gold medal – first place	1992 Barcelona	100 metres - B1
Gold medal – first place	1992 Barcelona	4×100 metre relay - B1-B3
Gold medal – first place	1996 Atlanta	100 metres - T10
Gold medal – first place	1996 Atlanta	200 metres - T10
Gold medal – first place	1996 Atlanta	4×100 metre relay - T10-12
Silver medal – second place	1992 Barcelona	200 metres - B1
Bronze medal – third place	2000 Sydney	200 metres - T11
Bronze medal – third place	2000 Sydney	4×100 metre relay - T11-13

Júlio Requena is a Paralympic athlete from Spain competing mainly in category T11 sprint events.

== Playing career ==
Requena first competed in the Paralympics in his home country in 1992 where he won a gold medal as part of the B1>B3 4×100 m relay team and in 100 m as well as a silver medal in the 200 m. The following games in Atlanta in 1996 he won the 100 m, 200 m and was part of the victorious 4×100 m as well as competing in the 400 m. The 2000 Summer Paralympics gave him a further two medals, both bronzes in the 200 m and 4×100 m as he also competed in the 100 m.
