= Jorge Llerena =

Uruguayan Paralympic athlete

Medal record

Paralympic athletics

Representing Uruguay

Paralympic Games
Bronze medal – third place	1996 Atlanta	200 metres - T10

Jorge Llerena is a paralympic athlete from Uruguay.

Llerena competed in two Paralympics, firstly in 1996 where he competed in the T10 200m, winning a bronze medal. His final appearance came in 2000, not winning any medal.
