= Uruguayan Paralympic Committee =

National Paralympic Committee of Uruguay

Uruguayan Paralympic Committee Comité Paralímpico Uruguayo
National Paralympic Committee
- Country: Uruguay
- Code: URU
- Created: 1996
- Continental association: APC
- President: Daniel Facal
- Website: CPU

The Uruguayan Paralympic Committee or CPU (Spanish: Comité Paralímpico Uruguayo – CPU) is the private, non-profit organization representing Uruguayan Paralympic athletes in the International Paralympic Committee (IPC), the Parapan American Games and the South American Para Games. It is the governing body of Uruguayan Paralympic sport.

== See also ==
- Uruguay at the Paralympics
- Uruguayan Olympic Committee
