= Sergio Arturo Perez =

Cuban judoka (born 1968)

Sergio Arturo Pérez
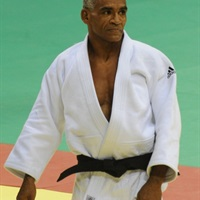
- Sergio Arturo Pérez Hechavarría

Personal information
- Full name: Sergio Arturo Pérez Hechavarría
- Nationality: Cuba
- Born: 26 December 1968 (age 57) Havana, Cuba
Medal record
Judo
Representing Cuba
Paralympic Games
Gold medal – first place	2000 Sydney	Men's 60kg
Disqualified	2004 Athens	Men's 60kg
Parapan American Games
Silver medal – second place	2011 Guadalajara	Men's 60kg

Sergio Arturo Perez Hechavarria (born 26 December 1968) is a Cuban Paralympic judoka. In 2000 he won the gold medal in the men's 60 kg. He won another gold medal in 2004, but was stripped of the medal for doping.
