= Carol-Eduard Novak =

Romanian cyclist, Minister for Youth and Sport of Romania

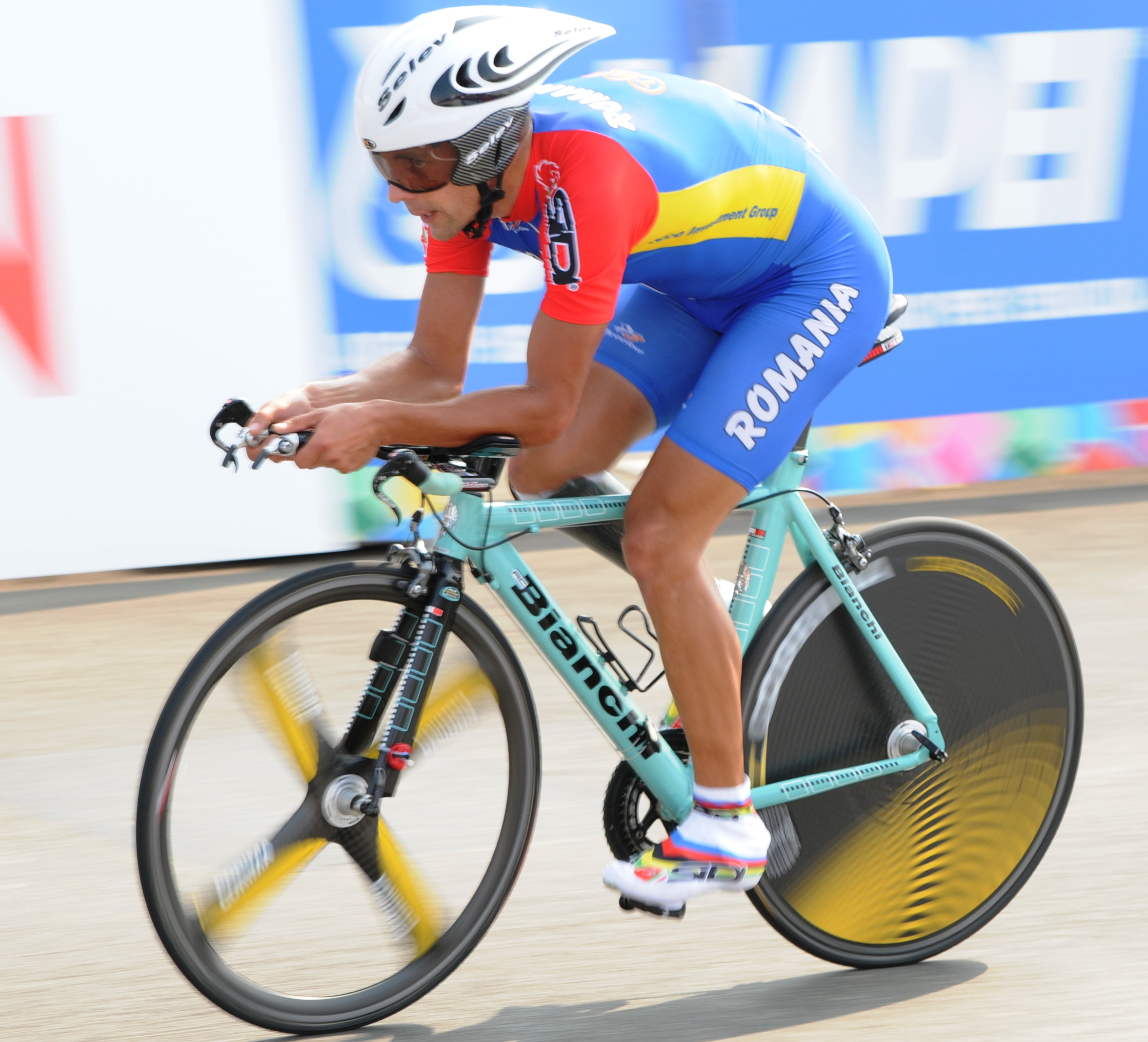
- Novak at the 2009 UCI Road World Championships

Personal information
- Full name: Carol-Eduard Novak
- Born: 28 July 1976 (age 50) Miercurea Ciuc, Romania

Cycling career
- Sport: Cycling
- Current team: Team Novak
- Disciplines: Road; Track
- Role: Rider

Professional teams
- 2009–2017: Tuşnad Cycling Team
- 2018–: Team Novak
Medal record
Men's para-cycling
Representing Romania
Paralympic Games
Gold medal – first place	2012 London	Individual pursuit C4 – Track
Silver medal – second place	2008 Beijing	Time trial LC2 – Road
Silver medal – second place	2012 London	Time trial C4 – Road
Silver medal – second place	2020 Tokyo	Men's individual pursuit C4
Road World Championships
Silver medal – second place	2015 Nottwil	Road Race (C4)

Carol-Eduard Novak (Hungarian: Novák Károly Eduárd, Hungarian pronunciation: [ˈnovaːk ˈkaːroj ˈɛduaːrd]; born 28 July 1976) is a Romanian road and track racing cyclist, who currently rides for UCI Continental team Team Novak.

Initially a speed skater, Novak lost one of his feet in a car crash in 1996. Subsequently, he switched to cycling and emerged as a professional cyclist. He took part in his first Paralympics in 2004, followed by two more participations in 2008 and 2012. At the 2008 Paralympic Games, Novak won the silver medal in the individual time trial, thus capturing Romania's first-ever Paralympic medal. At the 2012 Games, he reached further milestones by winning the gold medal in the 1-kilometre (0.62-mile) track pursuit event – the first-ever in the country's Paralympic history – and setting a new world-record time en route to the final. Additionally, he collected a silver medal in the road time trial race.

He has been serving as Minister for Youth and Sport in the Cîțu Cabinet since December 2020.

== Early life and car crash ==
Novak, who comes from the Hungarian minority of Romania, was born in Miercurea Ciuc. Located in the Harghita County, one of the coldest regions and the centre of winter sports in Romania, Novak initially began with speed skating, winning national titles in younger age categories and breaking a number of youth records. Still a junior, Novak won the Romanian National Championship, before in 1996, while traveling to an international event in Italy, he suffered a car crash, which resulted in his right leg being amputated below the ankle. The first operation performed in Luduș was unsuccessful due to postoperative infections and eventually he was transferred to Budapest, Hungary, where he was operated on once again. Two years later, after recovering from the injury, Novak began cycling on the amateur level.

== Cyclist career ==
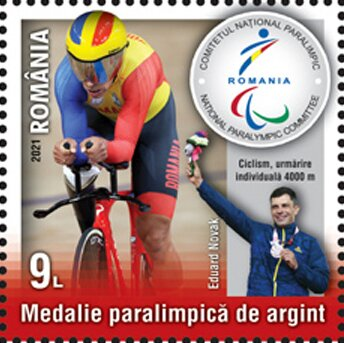
Novak on a 2021 stamp of Romania

For years, Novak, an alumnus of the Faculty of Law of the University of Bucharest, worked as a lawyer and trained after hours. He turned professional in 2001 and achieved his first major result in 2003 by winning the Paracyclist European Championship. He made it to the 2004 Summer Paralympics, where he finished fourth in both of his races. In the same year with a group of fellow cyclist he created a team, that later with the support of the a local mineral water producer Apemin Tusnad SA became the Tusnad Cycling Team, Romania's leading cycling team. With Róbert Ráduly, Mayor of Miercurea Ciuc, he was also the co-founder of Tour of Szeklerland, of which first edition took place in 2008.

2008 marked Novak's first Paralympic success as well; being the flagbearer of Romania, he won a silver medal in the road race at the Beijing Games, becoming the country's first ever Paralympic medalist. Novak also added two 4th places to his results tally. For his achievement, he was awarded the Order of Sports Merit by the President of Romania at the time, Traian Băsescu.

Four years later he traveled to the 2012 Summer Paralympics as Romania's main medal hope and was given the flagbearer duty once again. Novak competed in four events in London. Starting off in the London Velopark on 31 August, he placed seventh in the 1 km individual time trial. The next day Novak raced in the 4 km individual pursuit and made it to the final with a new world-record time of 4:40.315. Novak met Jiří Ježek in the decisive heat, where although he had a slower time than in the qualification run (4:42.00), he beat his Czech opponent by more than three seconds (4:45.232) thus winning the first ever Paralympic gold medal for Romania.

Novak does not only to compete with other disabled riders but also races against professional able-bodied cyclists. He has several podium finishes in the Romanian national championships for able bodied athletes, in the road and time-trial events. Novak also participated in other national events. In the 24 km individual time trial he came second behind Ježek, his main opponent already during the track races. In the 80 km road race Novak finished eighth, being 16 seconds behind gold medalist Yegor Dementyev and 3 seconds away from a podium place.

== Political career ==
Carol-Eduard Novak was proposed as Minister for Youth and Sport by the junior coalition partner Democratic Alliance of Hungarians in Romania (UDMR) to the Cîțu Cabinet following the 2020 legislative election. Novak was sworn in to office on 23 December 2020.
