= Henry Borges =

Uruguayan Paralympic judoka

Personal information
- Born: 30 April 1983 (age 43) Artigas, Uruguay
- Occupation: Judoka

Sport
- Country: Uruguay
- Sport: Para judo
Medal record
Para judo
Representing Uruguay
Parapan American Games
Gold medal – first place	2015 Toronto	Men's -60kg
Gold medal – first place	2019 Lima	Men's -60kg
Silver medal – second place	2007 Rio de Janeiro	Men's -60kg

Henry Borges (born 30 April 1983) is a blind Uruguayan para judoka who competes in international level events. He was the first Uruguayan Paralympic competitor to participate in three Paralympic Games, his highest achievement was reaching the bronze medal match at 2016 Summer Paralympics and lost to Alex Bologa.
