= Alex Bologa =

Romanian judoka (born 1995)

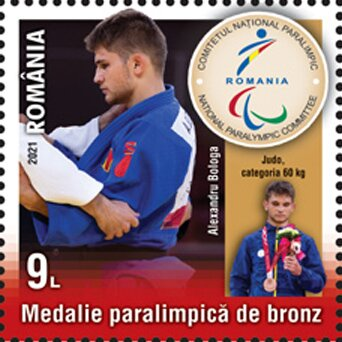
- Bologa on 2021 stamp of Romania

Personal information
- Full name: Florin-Alexandru Bologa
- Born: 7 November 1995 (age 30) Zalau, Romania
- Education: Babeș-Bolyai University
- Occupation: Judoka

Sport
- Country: Romania
- Sport: Para judo
- Disability class: J1
- Weight class: −73 kg
- Club: Clubul Sportiv Universitatea Cluj
- Coached by: Andreica Gianina; Tamas Gergely
Medal record
Para judo
Representing Romania
Paralympic Games
| Gold medal – first place | 2024 Paris | 73 kg J1 |
| Bronze medal – third place | 2016 Rio de Janeiro | 60 kg |
| Bronze medal – third place | 2020 Tokyo | 60 kg |
European Para Championships
| Gold medal – first place | 2023 Rotterdam | 73 kg J1 |

Profile at external databases
- IJF: 64907
- JudoInside.com: 99818

Florin-Alexandru "Alex" Bologa (born 7 November 1995) is a Romanian visually impaired Paralympic judoka. Competing in the 60-kg weight division he won bronze medals at the 2016 and 2020 Paralympics, and a gold medal at the 2024 Paralympics.

== Career ==
Bologa took up judo at school, aged 11. He has a degree in psychology from the Babeș-Bolyai University.
