= Algeria national athletics team =

National sports team

ALG Track & Field
- Sport: Track & Field; Long-Distance Running; Race Walking
- Jurisdiction: National
- Abbreviation: ALGTF
- Founded: 1962
- Headquarters: Algiers, Algeria
- Sponsor: Mobilis
- (Algeria)

The Algeria national athletics team represents Algeria at the international athletics competitions such as Olympic Games or World Athletics Championships.

== Medal count ==
Competition	Medal table				
Competition	1st place, gold medalist(s)	2nd place, silver medalist(s)	3rd place, bronze medalist(s)	Tot.	Rank
Summer Olympics	4	3	3	10	40
Summer Paralympics	27	22	33	82	32
World Championships	6	3	3	12	34
World Indoor Championships	1	1	2	4	55
World Para Championships	57	58	46	161	15
Mediterranean Games	33	19	35	87	7
African Games	29	37	38	104	5
African Championships	82	56	76	214	4
Total	239	199	236	674	−

== List of medalists at Olympic Games ==
Medal	Name	Games	Event	Date
Gold	Hassiba Boulmerka	1992 Barcelona	Women's 1500 metres	8 August 1992
Gold	Noureddine Morceli	1996 Atlanta	Men's 1500 metres	3 August 1996
Bronze	Abderrahmane Hammad	2000 Sydney	Men's high jump	24 September 2000
Bronze	Djabir Saïd-Guerni	2000 Sydney	Men's 800 metres	27 September 2000
Gold	Nouria Merah-Benida	2000 Sydney	Women's 1500 metres	30 September 2000
Silver	Ali Saïdi-Sief	2000 Sydney	Men's 5000 metres	30 September 2000
Gold	Taoufik Makhloufi	2012 London	Men's 1500 metres	7 August 2012
Silver	Taoufik Makhloufi	2016 Rio de Janeiro	Men's 800 metres	15 August 2016
Silver	Taoufik Makhloufi	2016 Rio de Janeiro	Men's 1500 metres	20 August 2016
Bronze	Djamel Sedjati	2024 Paris	Men's 800 m	10 August 2024

== List of medalists at Paralympic Games ==
Medal	Name	Games	Event	Date
Gold	Mohamed Allek	(United States) 1996 Atlanta	100 m T36	
Gold	Mohamed Allek	(United States) 1996 Atlanta	200 m T36	
Silver	Faouzi Bellele	(United States) 1996 Atlanta	Men's 5000m T34-37	
Silver	Youcef Boudjeltia	(United States) 1996 Atlanta	Men's 400m T12	
Bronze	Faouzi Bellele	(United States) 1996 Atlanta	Men's 800m T34-36	
Bronze	Faouzi Bellele	(United States) 1996 Atlanta	Men's 1500m T34-37	
Bronze	Bachir Zergoune	(United States) 1996 Atlanta	Men's 800m T44-46	
Gold	Mohamed Allek	(Australia) 2000 Sydney	100 m T37	
Gold	Mohamed Allek	(Australia) 2000 Sydney	200 m T37	
Gold	Mohamed Allek	(Australia) 2000 Sydney	400 m T37	
Gold	Karim Betina	(Greece) 2004 Athens	Men's Shot put F32	19 September 2004
Gold	Nadia Medjemedj	(Greece) 2004 Athens	Women's Shot put F56-58	20 September 2004
Gold	Samir Nouioua	(Greece) 2004 Athens	Men's 1500m T46	20 September 2004
Bronze	Khaled Hanani	(Greece) 2004 Athens	Men's 1500m T37	20 September 2004
Bronze	Mohamed Aissaoui	(Greece) 2004 Athens	Men's 1500m T46	20 September 2004
Bronze	Mohamed Allek	(Greece) 2004 Athens	Men's 200m T37	21 September 2004
Bronze	Karim Betina	(Greece) 2004 Athens	Men's Club throw F32/51	21 September 2004
Bronze	Omar Benchiheb	(Greece) 2004 Athens	Men's 1500m T11	22 September 2004
Silver	Samir Nouioua	(Greece) 2004 Athens	Men's 800m T46	25 September 2004
Silver	Hakim Yahiaoui	(Greece) 2004 Athens	Men's Discus throw F13	25 September 2004
Gold	Samir Nouioua	(Greece) 2004 Athens	Men's 5000m T46	27 September 2004
Gold	Sofia Djelal	(Greece) 2004 Athens	Women's Javelin throw F56-58	27 September 2004
Bronze	Mounir Bakiri	(China) 2008 Beijing	Men's Shot Put F32	8 September 2008
Gold	Karim Betina	(China) 2008 Beijing	Men's Shot Put - F32	8 September 2008
Bronze	Nadia Medjemedj	(China) 2008 Beijing	Women's Shot Put F57/58	9 September 2008
Bronze	Samir Nouioua	(China) 2008 Beijing	Men's 1500m T46	10 September 2008
Gold	Kamel Kardjena	(China) 2008 Beijing	Men's Shot Put - F33/34/52	12 September 2008
Bronze	Sofiane Hamdi	(China) 2008 Beijing	Men's 100m T37	12 September 2008
Silver	Louadjeda Benoumessad	(China) 2008 Beijing	Women's Javelin Throw F33/34/52/53	13 September 2008
Silver	Samir Nouioua	(China) 2008 Beijing	Men's 800m T46	15 September 2008
Bronze	Zine Eddine Sekhri	(China) 2008 Beijing	Men's 800m T13	15 September 2008
Bronze	Hocine Gherzouli	(China) 2008 Beijing	Men's Shot Put F40	15 September 2008
Silver	Sofiane Hamdi	(China) 2008 Beijing	Men's 200m T37	16 September 2008
Bronze	Nadia Medjemedj	(China) 2008 Beijing	Women's discus throw F57–58	16 September 2008
Bronze	Mohamed Berrahal	(United Kingdom) 2012 London	Men's 100 m T51	31 August 2012
Silver	Safia Djelal	(United Kingdom) 2012 London	Women's javelin throw F58	1 September 2012
Silver	Mounia Gasmi	(United Kingdom) 2012 London	Women's club throw F31/32/51	1 September 2012
Bronze	Kamel Kardjena	(United Kingdom) 2012 London	Men's discus throw F32-34	1 September 2012
Bronze	Lahouari Bahlaz	(United Kingdom) 2012 London	Men's club throw F31/32/51	3 September 2012
Gold	Kamel Kardjena	(United Kingdom) 2012 London	Men's shot put F32-33	4 September 2012
Silver	Karim Betina	(United Kingdom) 2012 London	Men's shot put F32-33	4 September 2012
Bronze	Mounir Bakiri	(United Kingdom) 2012 London	Men's shot put F32-33	4 September 2012
Gold	Nassima Saifi	(United Kingdom) 2012 London	Women's discus throw F57–58	4 September 2012
Bronze	Samir Nouioua	(United Kingdom) 2012 London	Men's 1500 m T46	4 September 2012
Gold	Mohamed Berrahal	(United Kingdom) 2012 London	Men's discus throw F51–53	6 September 2012
Silver	Hocine Gherzouli	(United Kingdom) 2012 London	Men's discus throw F40	6 September 2012
Silver	Lynda Hamri	(United Kingdom) 2012 London	Women's long jump F13	7 September 2012
Bronze	Lahouari Bahlaz	(United Kingdom) 2012 London	Men's discus throw F32-34	7 September 2012
Gold	Abdellatif Baka	(United Kingdom) 2012 London	Men's 800 m T13	8 September 2012
Silver	Samir Nouioua	(United Kingdom) 2012 London	Men's 800 m T46	8 September 2012
Silver	Lahouari Bahlaz	(Brazil) 2016 Rio de Janeiro	Men's shot put F32	8 September 2016
Silver	Nassima Saifi	(Brazil) 2016 Rio de Janeiro	Women's shot put F56/57	8 September 2016
Bronze	Nadia Medjemedj	(Brazil) 2016 Rio de Janeiro	Women's shot put F56/57	8 September 2016
Silver	Mounia Gasmi	(Brazil) 2016 Rio de Janeiro	Women's club throw F31/32	9 September 2016
Silver	Kamel Kardjena	(Brazil) 2016 Rio de Janeiro	Men's shot put F33	10 September 2016
Bronze	Nadia Medjemedj	(Brazil) 2016 Rio de Janeiro	Women's javelin throw F56	10 September 2016
Bronze	Madjid Djemai	(Brazil) 2016 Rio de Janeiro	1500 metres T37	11 September 2016
Gold	Abdellatif Baka	(Brazil) 2016 Rio de Janeiro	1500 metres T13	11 September 2016
Silver	Mohamed Berrahal	(Brazil) 2016 Rio de Janeiro	Men's 100 metres T51	13 September 2016
Bronze	Lynda Hamri	(Brazil) 2016 Rio de Janeiro	Women's long jump T12	13 September 2016
Bronze	Mohamed Fouad Hamoumou	(Brazil) 2016 Rio de Janeiro	Men's 400 metres T13	15 September 2016
Gold	Nassima Saifi	(Brazil) 2016 Rio de Janeiro	discus throw F56/57	15 September 2016
Bronze	Sofiane Hamdi	(Brazil) 2016 Rio de Janeiro	Men's 400 metres T37	16 September 2016
Gold	Samir Nouioua	(Brazil) 2016 Rio de Janeiro	Men's 1500 metres T46	16 September 2016
Gold	Asmahan Boudjadar	(Brazil) 2016 Rio de Janeiro	Women's shot put F33	16 September 2016
Bronze	Mounia Gasmi	(Japan) 2020 Tokyo	Women's club throw	27 August 2021
Silver	Nassima Saifi	(Japan) 2020 Tokyo	Women's discus throw F57	28 August 2021
Bronze	Walid Ferhah	(Japan) 2020 Tokyo	Men's club throw F32	28 August 2021
Silver	Skander Djamil Athmani	(Japan) 2020 Tokyo	Men's 100 metres T13	29 August 2021
Bronze	Lynda Hamri	(Japan) 2020 Tokyo	Women's long jump T12	29 August 2021
Gold	Skander Djamil Athmani	(Japan) 2020 Tokyo	Men's 400 metres T13	2 September 2021
Gold	Safia Djelal	(Japan) 2020 Tokyo	Women's shot put F57	2 September 2021
Gold	Asmahan Boudjadar	(Japan) 2020 Tokyo	Women's shot put F33	2 September 2021
Silver	Abdelkrim Krai	(Japan) 2020 Tokyo	Men's 1500 metres T38	4 September 2021
Silver	Kamel Kardjena	(Japan) 2020 Tokyo	Men's shot put F33	4 September 2021
Gold	Nassima Saifi	(France) 2024 Paris	Women's discus throw F57	31 August 2024
Bronze	Ahmed Mehideb	(France) 2024 Paris	Men's club throw F32	31 August 2024
Gold	Skander Djamil Athmani	(France) 2024 Paris	Men's 100 metres T13	1 September 2024
Bronze	Lynda Hamri	(France) 2024 Paris	Women's long jump T12	1 September 2024
Gold	Skander Djamil Athmani	(France) 2024 Paris	Men's 400 m T13	5 September 2024
Gold	Safia Djelal	(France) 2024 Paris	Women's shot put F57	5 September 2024
Bronze	Nassima Saifi	(France) 2024 Paris	Women's shot put F57	5 September 2024

== List of medalists at World Championships ==
Medal	Name	Games	Event	Date
Gold	Hassiba Boulmerka	(Japan) 1991 Tokyo	Women's 1500 metres	31 August 1991
Bronze	Azzedine Brahmi	(Japan) 1991 Tokyo	Men's 3000 metres steeplechase	31 August 1991
Gold	Noureddine Morceli	(Japan) 1991 Tokyo	Men's 1500 metres	1 September 1991
Gold	Noureddine Morceli	(Germany) 1993 Stuttgart	Men's 1500 metres	22 August 1993
Bronze	Hassiba Boulmerka	(Germany) 1993 Stuttgart	Women's 1500 metres	22 August 1993
Gold	Hassiba Boulmerka	(Sweden) 1995 Gothenburg	Women's 1500 metres	5 August 1995
Gold	Noureddine Morceli	(Sweden) 1995 Gothenburg	Men's 1500 metres	13 August 1995
Bronze	Djabir Saïd-Guerni	(Spain) 1999 Seville	Men's 800 metres	29 August 1999
Gold	Djabir Saïd-Guerni	(France) 2003 Paris	Men's 800 metres	31 August 2003
Silver	Taoufik Makhloufi	(Qatar) 2019 Doha	Men's 1500 metres	6 October 2019
Silver	Djamel Sedjati	(United States) 2022 Oregon	Men's 800 metres	23 July 2022
Silver	Djamel Sedjati	(Japan) 2025 Tokyo	Men's 800 metres	20 September 2025

== List of medalists at World Ultimate Championship ==
Medal	Name	Games	Event	Date
Gold	Djamel Sedjati	(Hungary) 2026 Budapest	Men's 800 metres	13 September 2026

== List of medalists at World Indoor Championships ==
Medal	Name	Games	Event	Date
Bronze	Othmane Belfaa	(France) 1985 Paris	Men's High jump	18 January 1985
Gold	Noureddine Morceli	(Spain) 1991 Seville	Men's 1500 metres	9 March 1991
Silver	Yasser Triki	(United Kingdom) 2024 Glasgow	Men's Triple jump	1 March 2024
Bronze	Yasser Triki	(Poland) 2026 Toruń	Men's Triple jump	20 March 2026

== See also ==
- Algeria at the Olympics
- List of Algerian records in athletics
- Athletics Summer Olympics medal table
- World Championships medal table
