= Algeria at the 2008 Summer Paralympics =

- IPC code: ALG
- NPC: Algerian National Paralympic Committee

in Beijing
- Competitors: 28 in 2 sports
- Medals Ranked 31st: Gold 4 Silver 3 Bronze 8 Total 15

Summer Paralympics appearances (overview)
- 1992; 1996; 2000; 2004; 2008; 2012; 2016; 2020; 2024

Algeria sent a delegation to compete at the 2008 Summer Paralympics in Beijing, People's Republic of China.

== Competitors ==
Sport	Men	Women	Total
Athletics	18	5	23
Judo	3	2	5
Total	21	7	28

== Medallists ==
The following Algerian competitors won medals at the games:

Medal	Name	Sport	Event	Date
Gold	Karim Betina	Athletics	Men's Shot Put - F32	8 September
Gold	Kamel Kardjena	Athletics	Men's Shot Put - F33/34/52	12 September
Gold	Mouloud Noura	Judo	Men -60 kg	7 September
Gold	Sidali Lamri	Judo	Men -66 kg	7 September
Silver	Sofiane Hamdi	Athletics	Men's 200m T37	16 September
Silver	Samir Nouioua	Athletics	Men's 800m T46	15 September
Silver	Louadjeda Benoumessad	Athletics	Women's Javelin Throw F33/34/52/53	13 September
Bronze	Mounir Bakiri	Athletics	Men's Shot Put F32	8 September
Bronze	Hocine Gherzouli	Athletics	Men's Shot Put F40	15 September
Bronze	Sofiane Hamdi	Athletics	Men's 100m T37	12 September
Bronze	Samir Nouioua	Athletics	Men's 1500m T46	10 September
Bronze	Zine Eddine Sekhri	Athletics	Men's 800m T13	15 September
Bronze	Nadia Medjemedj	Athletics	Women's Shot Put F57/58	9 September
Bronze	Zoubida Bouazoug	Judo	Women's +70 kg	9 September
Bronze	Nadia Medjemedj	Athletics	Women's discus throw F57–58	16 September

Medals by sport
Sport	Gold medal	Silver medal	Bronze medal	Total
Athletics	2	3	7	12
Judo	2	0	1	3
Total	4	3	8	15

Medals by day
Day	Date	1st place, gold medalist(s)	2nd place, silver medalist(s)	3rd place, bronze medalist(s)	Total
1	7 September	2	0	0	2
2	8 September	1	0	1	2
3	9 September	0	0	2	2
4	10 September	0	0	1	1
6	12 September	1	0	1	2
7	13 September	0	1	0	1
9	15 September	0	1	2	3
10	16 September	0	1	1	2
Total		4	3	8	15

Multiple medalists
Name	Sport	1st place, gold medalist(s)	2nd place, silver medalist(s)	3rd place, bronze medalist(s)	Total
Samir Nouioua	Athletics	0	1	1	2
Sofiane Hamdi	Athletics	0	1	1	2
Nadia Medjemedj	Athletics	0	0	2	2

== Results by event ==
=== Athletics ===
Men–track

Athlete	Event	Heat		Semifinal		Final	
Athlete	Event	Result	Rank	Result	Rank	Result	Rank
Mohamed Aissaoui	1500 m T46	4:11.53	13	—N/a		did not advance	
Mohamed Allek	100 m T37	12.69	12	—N/a		did not advance	
Mohamed Allek	200 m T37	25.51	15	—N/a		did not advance	
Mohamed Allek	4 × 100 m T35-38	—N/a				Dq	
Mohamed Bouadda	100 m T54	15.55	12	—N/a		did not advance	
Mohamed Bouadda	200 m T54	26.84	20	—N/a		did not advance	
Allel Boukhalfa	100 m T35	—N/a				13.59	6
Allel Boukhalfa	4 × 100 m T35-38	—N/a				Dq	
Mohamed Boulesnam	200 m T36	—N/a				27.55	8
Sofiane Hamdi	100 m T37	12.15	3Q	—N/a		12.01	3rd place, bronze medalist(s)
Sofiane Hamdi	200 m T37	24.39	2Q	—N/a		24.10	2nd place, silver medalist(s)
Sofiane Hamdi	4 × 100 m T35-38	—N/a				Dq	
Khaled Hanani	800 m T37	—N/a				2:16.03	8
Redouane Merah	400 m T12	51.12	8q	51.07	5	did not advance	
Mustapha Moussaoui	200 m T37	26.09	14	—N/a		did not advance	
Mustapha Moussaoui	4 × 100 m T35-38	—N/a				Dq	
Samir Nouioua	800 m T46	1:59.20	4Q	—N/a		1:52.97	2nd place, silver medalist(s)
Samir Nouioua	1500 m T46	4:07.52	1Q	—N/a		3:53.63	3rd place, bronze medalist(s)
Abdenour Rechidi	1500 m T46	4:11.56	14	—N/a		did not advance	
Hamza Rehouni	800 m T46	Dq		—N/a		did not advance	
Zine Eddine Sekhri	400 m T13	50.05	4Q	—N/a		50.24	6
Zine Eddine Sekhri	800 m T13	—N/a				1:55.90	3rd place, bronze medalist(s)

Men–field

Athlete	Event	Final	
Athlete	Event	Result	Rank
Mounir Bakiri	Discus F32/51	DNS	
Mounir Bakiri	Shot put F32	9.37	3rd place, bronze medalist(s)
Karim Betina	Club throw F32/51	31.36	6
Karim Betina	Discus F32/51	19.04	4
Karim Betina	Shot put F32	10.65 WR	1st place, gold medalist(s)
Amar Tarek Boulhbel	Shot put F33/34/52	9.78	10
Hocine Gherzouli	Shot put F40	11.08	3rd place, bronze medalist(s)
Kamel Kardjena	Shot put F33/34/52	11.54 WR	1st place, gold medalist(s)
Mustapha Moussaoui	Long jump F37/38	4.81	12

Women–field

Athlete	Event	Final	
Athlete	Event	Result	Rank
Louadjeda Benoumessad	Discus F32-34/51-53	16.25	12
Louadjeda Benoumessad	Javelin F33/34/52/53	17.28 WR	2nd place, silver medalist(s)
Louadjeda Benoumessad	Shot put F32-34/52/53	6.36	15
Safia Djelal	Javelin F57/58	29.89	5
Safia Djelal	Shot put F57/58	8.91	9
Nadia Medjemedj	Discus F57/58	28.74 PR	3rd place, bronze medalist(s)
Nadia Medjemedj	Shot put F57/58	10.93 WR	3rd place, bronze medalist(s)
Ouassila Oussadit	Discus F32-34/51-53	7.00	17
Ouassila Oussadit	Shot put F32-34/52/53	4.54	12
Nassima Saifi	Discus F57/58	34.09	4
Nassima Saifi	Shot put F57/58	8.49	10

=== Judo ===
Men

Sidali Lamri defeated Japan's Satoshi Fujimoto in the men's -66 kg final to win gold for his country.

Athlete	Event	Round of 16	Quarterfinals	Semifinals	First repechage round	Repechage semifinals	Final	
Athlete	Event	Opposition Result	Opposition Result	Opposition Result	Opposition Result	Opposition Result	Opposition Result	Rank
Sid Ali Lamri	-66 kg	BYE	Alishov (AZE); W 0010S-0001C	Golmohammadi Andarian (IRI); W 1001-0000	Bye		Fujimoto (JPN); W 0100GS-0000	1st place, gold medalist(s)
Messaoud Nine	-90 kg	Shevchenko (RUS); W 0010S-0001	Watson (USA); W 0001-0000S	Kretsul (RUS); L 0000-1000	BYE	Ingram (GER); L FG	Did not advance	5
Mouloud Noura	-60 kg	BYE	Hirose (JPN); W 1000-0001	Ibrahimov (AZE); W 1000S-0001	Bye		Rahmati (IRI); W 1000-0000	1st place, gold medalist(s)

Women

Athlete	Event	Round of 16	Quarterfinals	Semifinals	First repechage round	Repechage semifinals	Final	
Athlete	Event	Opposition Result	Opposition Result	Opposition Result	Opposition Result	Opposition Result	Opposition Result	Rank
Zoubida Bouazoug	+70 kg	—N/a	BYE	Yuan (CHN); L 0000-1010	BYE	de Pinies (ESP); W 0201S-0001	Did not advance	3rd place, bronze medalist(s)
Mounia Karkar	-57 kg	—N/a	Keramida (GRE); W 0010-0000	Brussig (GER); L 0000S-0011	BYE	Silva (BRA); L 0000-0100	Did not advance	5

== See also ==
- Algeria at the Paralympics
- Algeria at the 2008 Summer Olympics
