= List of flag bearers for Algeria at the Olympics =

Algeria at the Olympics
- IOC code: ALG
- NOC: Algerian Olympic Committee
- Website: www.coalgerie.com
- Medals: Gold 7 Silver 4 Bronze 9 Total 20

Summer appearances
- 1964; 1968; 1972; 1976; 1980; 1984; 1988; 1992; 1996; 2000; 2004; 2008; 2012; 2016; 2020; 2024

Winter appearances
- 1992; 1994–2002; 2006; 2010; 2014–2026

Other related appearances
- France (1896–1960)

This is a list of flag bearers who have represented Algeria at the Olympics.

Flag bearers carry the national flag of their country at the opening ceremony of the Olympic Games.

Key

Born outside Algeria

#	Year	Season	Flag bearer	Sex	Province/country	Sport	Ref.
1	1964	Summer	Mohamed Lazhari	M	Algiers	Gymnastics	
2	1968	Summer					
3	1972	Summer	Azzedine Azzouzi	M	Algiers	Athletics	
4	1980	Summer	Djamel Yahiouche	M		Swimming	
5	1984	Summer	Abdelkrim Bendjemil	M	Oran	Handball	
6	1988	Summer	Noureddine Tadjine	M	Constantine	Athletics	
7	1992	Winter	Nacera Boukamoum	F	France	Alpine skiing	
8	1992	Summer	Mourad Sennoun	M		Volleyball	
9	1996	Summer	Karim El-Mahouab	M	Algiers	Handball	
10	2000	Summer	Djabir Saïd-Guerni	M	Algiers	Athletics	
11	2004	Summer	Djabir Saïd-Guerni	M	Algiers	Athletics	
12	2006	Winter	Christelle Douibi	F	France	Alpine skiing	
13	2008	Summer	Salim Iles	M	Oran	Swimming	
14	2010	Winter	Mehdi-Selim Khelifi	M	France	Cross-country skiing	
15	2012	Summer	Abdelhafid Benchabla	M	Boumerdès	Boxing	
16	2016	Summer	Sonia Asselah	F	Tizi Ouzou	Judo	
17	2020	Summer	Mohamed Flissi	M	Boumerdès	Boxing	
17	2020	Summer	Amel Melih	F	France	Swimming	
18	2024	Summer	Amina Belkadi	F	Tlemcen	Judo	
18	2024	Summer	Yasser Triki	M	Constantine	Athletics	

== See also ==
- Algeria at the Olympics
