= Algeria at the Olympics =

- IOC code: ALG
- NOC: Algerian Olympic Committee
- Website: www.coa.dz
- Medals Ranked 67th: Gold 7 Silver 4 Bronze 9 Total 20

Summer appearances
- 1964; 1968; 1972; 1976; 1980; 1984; 1988; 1992; 1996; 2000; 2004; 2008; 2012; 2016; 2020; 2024

Winter appearances
- 1992; 1994–2002; 2006; 2010; 2014–2026

Other related appearances
- France (1896–1960)

Algeria first competed at the Olympic Games in 1964, and has participated in every Summer Olympic Games since then, except for the boycotted 1976 Summer Olympics. The nation has also sent athletes to compete at 3 Winter Olympic Games.

The National Olympic Committee for Algeria is the Comité Olympique Algérien (Algerian Olympic Committee), founded in 1963.

== History ==
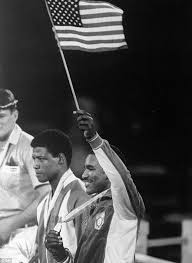
Mustapha Moussa winning Algeria's 1st Olympic medal in Los Angeles 1984

Before independence during the French Algeria period, the Algerian athletes were participating with France, among the most famous, the gold medalists Boughera El Ouafi in 1928, Alain Mimoun in 1956 and many others.

After independence in 1962, Algeria participated in the Olympic Games for the first time at the 1964 Summer Olympics with gymnast Mohamed Lazhari. Algeria withdrew from the 1976 Summer Olympics due to the refusal of the IOC to ban countries who had competed in South Africa amidst its apartheid policies. Almost every nation in Africa participated in the boycott. South Africa itself had been banned from the Olympics since 1964.

In the 1980 Summer Olympics Algeria participated for the first time in a team sport, competing in both football and handball. Their first medal came at the 1984 Summer Olympics, where Mustapha Moussa won bronze in boxing.

== Medal tables ==
=== Medals by Summer Games ===
Games	Athletes	Gold	Silver	Bronze	Total	Rank
1896–1960	as part of France					
(Japan) 1964 Tokyo	1	0	0	0	0	–
1968 Mexico City	3	0	0	0	0	–
(West Germany) 1972 Munich	5	0	0	0	0	–
(Canada) 1976 Montreal	did not participate					
(Soviet Union) 1980 Moscow	54	0	0	0	0	–
(United States) 1984 Los Angeles	32	0	0	2	2	42
(South Korea) 1988 Seoul	42	0	0	0	0	–
(Spain) 1992 Barcelona	35	1	0	1	2	34
(United States) 1996 Atlanta	45	2	0	1	3	34
(Australia) 2000 Sydney	47	1	1	3	5	41
(Greece) 2004 Athens	61	0	0	0	0	–
(China) 2008 Beijing	62	0	1	1	2	64
(United Kingdom) 2012 London	39	1	0	0	1	50
(Brazil) 2016 Rio de Janeiro	65	0	2	0	2	62
(Japan) 2020 Tokyo	41	0	0	0	0	–
(France) 2024 Paris	45	2	0	1	3	39
(United States) 2028 Los Angeles	future event					
(Australia) 2032 Brisbane	future event					
Total		7	4	9	20	67

=== Medals by Winter Games ===
Games	Athletes	Gold	Silver	Bronze	Total	Rank
(France) 1992 Albertville	4	0	0	0	0	–
(Norway) 1994 Lillehammer	did not participate					
(Japan) 1998 Nagano	did not participate					
(United States) 2002 Salt Lake City	did not participate					
(Italy) 2006 Turin	2	0	0	0	0	–
(Canada) 2010 Vancouver	1	0	0	0	0	–
2014–2026	did not participate					
(France) 2030 French Alps	future event					
(United States) 2034 Utah	future event					
Total		0	0	0	0	–

=== Medals by summer sport ===
Sport	Gold	Silver	Bronze	Total
Athletics	4	3	3	10
Boxing	2	0	5	7
Gymnastics	1	0	0	1
Judo	0	1	1	2
Totals (4 entries)	7	4	9	20

== Athletes with most medals ==
Only two Algerian athletes have won multiple medals in the history of the Olympic Games: middle-distance runner Taoufik Makhloufi, and boxer Hocine Soltani.

Athlete	Sport	Games	Gold medal	Silver medal	Bronze medal	Total
Taoufik Makhloufi	Athletics	2012–2016	1	2	0	3
Hocine Soltani	Boxing	1992–1996	1	0	1	2

Notes: in Khaki the athletes still in activity.

== Gold medalists ==
In this table (sorted by individual totals gold medals), athletes who have won a gold medal at the Olympics.

	Athlete	Sport	Born	Period	Individual						Team						Total									
	Athlete	Sport	Born	Period	Olympics			World Ch.			Olympics			World Ch.			Individual			Team			Individual + Team			
	Athlete	Sport	Born	Period	Gold medal	Silver medal	Bronze medal	Gold medal	Silver medal	Bronze medal	Gold medal	Silver medal	Bronze medal	Gold medal	Silver medal	Bronze medal										Tot.
1	Noureddine Morceli	Athletics	1970	1988–1998	1	0	0	3	0	0	0	0	0	0	0	0	4	0	0	0	0	0	4	0	0	4
2	Taoufik Makhloufi	Athletics	1988	2007–2021	1	2	0	0	1	0	0	0	0	0	0	0	1	3	0	0	0	0	1	3	0	4
3	Hassiba Boulmerka	Athletics	1968	1988–1997	1	0	0	2	0	1	0	0	0	0	0	0	3	0	1	0	0	0	3	0	1	4
4	Kaylia Nemour	Gymnastics	2006	2022–	1	0	0	1	2	0	0	0	0	0	0	0	2	2	0	0	0	0	2	2	0	4
5	Hocine Soltani	Boxing	1972	1991–2000	1	0	1	0	0	1	–	–	–	-	-	-	1	0	2	-	-	-	1	0	2	3
6	Imane Khelif	Boxing	1999	2018–	1	0	0	0	1	0	–	–	–	-	-	-	1	1	0	-	-	-	1	1	0	2
7	Nouria Merah-Benida	Athletics	1970	1996–2006	1	0	0	0	0	0	–	–	–	-	-	-	1	0	0	-	-	-	1	0	0	1

Notes: in Khaki the athletes still in activity.

== List of medalists ==
Medal	Name	Games	Sport	Event	Date
Bronze	Mustapha Moussa	1984 Los Angeles	Boxing	Men's light-heavyweight	9 August 1984
Bronze	Mohamed Zaoui	1984 Los Angeles	Boxing	Men's middleweight	9 August 1984
Gold	Hassiba Boulmerka	1992 Barcelona	Athletics	Women's 1500 metres	8 August 1992
Bronze	Hocine Soltani	1992 Barcelona	Boxing	Men's featherweight	7 August 1992
Gold	Noureddine Morceli	1996 Atlanta	Athletics	Men's 1500 metres	3 August 1996
Gold	Hocine Soltani	1996 Atlanta	Boxing	Men's lightweight	4 August 1996
Bronze	Mohamed Bahari	1996 Atlanta	Boxing	Men's middleweight	1 August 1996
Gold	Nouria Merah-Benida	2000 Sydney	Athletics	Women's 1500 metres	30 September 2000
Silver	Ali Saïdi-Sief	2000 Sydney	Athletics	Men's 5000 metres	30 September 2000
Bronze	Abderrahmane Hammad	2000 Sydney	Athletics	Men's high jump	24 September 2000
Bronze	Djabir Saïd-Guerni	2000 Sydney	Athletics	Men's 800 metres	27 September 2000
Bronze	Mohamed Allalou	2000 Sydney	Boxing	Men's light-welterweight	29 September 2000
Silver	Amar Benikhlef	2008 Beijing	Judo	Men's -90 kg	13 August 2008
Bronze	Soraya Haddad	2008 Beijing	Judo	Women's -52 kg	10 August 2008
Gold	Taoufik Makhloufi	2012 London	Athletics	Men's 1500 metres	7 August 2012
Silver	Taoufik Makhloufi	2016 Rio de Janeiro	Athletics	Men's 800 metres	15 August 2016
Silver	Taoufik Makhloufi	2016 Rio de Janeiro	Athletics	Men's 1500 metres	20 August 2016
Gold	Kaylia Nemour	2024 Paris	Gymnastics	Women's uneven bars	4 August 2024
Gold	Imane Khelif	2024 Paris	Boxing	Women's 66 kg	9 August 2024
Bronze	Djamel Sedjati	2024 Paris	Athletics	Men's 800 metres	10 August 2024

== Flagbearers ==
Summer Olympics
Games	Athlete	Sport
1964 Tokyo	Mohamed Lazhari	Gymnastics
1968 Mexico City		
1972 Munich	Azzedine Azzouzi	Athletics
1976 Montreal	did not participate	
1980 Moscow	Djamel Yahiouche	Swimming
1984 Los Angeles	Abdelkrim Bendjemil	Handball
1988 Seoul	Noureddine Tadjine	Athletics
1992 Barcelona	Mourad Sennoun	Volleyball
1996 Atlanta	Karim El-Mahouab	Handball
2000 Sydney	Djabir Saïd-Guerni	Athletics
2004 Athens	Djabir Saïd-Guerni	Athletics
2008 Beijing	Salim Iles	Swimming
2012 London	Abdelhafid Benchabla	Boxing
2016 Rio de Janeiro	Sonia Asselah	Judo
2020 Tokyo	Mohamed Flissi & Amel Melih	Boxing (Flissi) & Swimming (Melih)
2024 Paris	Yasser Triki & Amina Belkadi	Athletics (Triki) & Judo (Belkadi)

Winter Olympics
Games	Athlete	Sport
1992 Albertville	Nacera Boukamoum	Alpine skiing
1994 Lillehammer	did not participate	
1998 Nagano	did not participate	
2002 Salt Lake City	did not participate	
2006 Turin	Christelle Douibi	Alpine skiing
2010 Vancouver	Mehdi-Selim Khelifi	Cross-country skiing
2014 Sochi	did not participate	
2018 Pyeongchang	did not participate	
2022 Beijing	did not participate	
2026 Milano Cortina	future event	

== See also ==
- Algeria national athletics team
- List of participating nations at the Summer Olympic Games
- List of participating nations at the Winter Olympic Games
- Category:Olympic competitors for Algeria
- Algeria at the Paralympics
- Algeria at the African Games
- Algeria at the Mediterranean Games
- Algeria at the Arab Games
- Algeria at the Islamic Solidarity Games
