= Alpine skiing at the 2006 Winter Olympics – Women's super-G =

Women's super-G at the XX Olympic Winter Games
- Pictogram for alpine skiing
- Venue: San Sicario
- Date: February 20, 2006
- Competitors: 56 from 24 nations
- Winning time: 1:32.47

Medalists
| 1st place, gold medalist(s) | | Michaela Dorfmeister | Austria |
| 2nd place, silver medalist(s) | | Janica Kostelić | Croatia |
| 3rd place, bronze medalist(s) | | Alexandra Meissnitzer | Austria |

Women's Super-G
- Interactive map of Women's Super-G
- Location: San Sicario; Fraiteve Olympique
- Vertical: 548 m (1,798 ft)
- Top elevation: 2,286 m (7,500 ft)
- Base elevation: 1,738 m (5,702 ft)

The women's super-G of the 2006 Winter Olympics was held at San Sicario, Italy, on Monday, 20 February; it was delayed a day due to poor weather conditions.

Defending Olympic champion Daniela Ceccarelli was 37th in the current season's World Cup downhill standings, headed by Michaela Dorfmeister from Austria, followed by teammate Alexandra Meissnitzer. Anja Pärson of Sweden was defending world champion and was fourth in the current season's super-G standings.

Dorfmeister won the gold medal, Janica Kostelić of Croatia took the silver, and Meissnitzer was the bronze medalist; Pärson was twelfth and Ceccarelli was 31st. Dorfmeister had also won the downhill gold medal five days earlier, and Kostelic's medal was her sixth at the Olympics.

The Fraiteve Olympique course started at an elevation of 2,286 m (7,500 ft) above sea level with a vertical drop of 548 m (1,798 ft) and a course length of 2.331 km (1.45 mi). Dorfmeister's winning time was 92.47 seconds, yielding an average course speed of 90.749 km/h (56.4 mph), with an average vertical descent rate of 5.926 m/s (19.4 ft/s).

== Results ==
Monday, 20 February 2006

The race was started at 14:45 local time, (UTC +1). At the starting gate, the skies were mostly cloudy, the temperature was −2.9 °C (27 °F), and the snow condition was packed; the temperature at the finish was 1.2 °C (34 °F).

| Rank | Bib | Name | Country | Time | Difference |
|---|---|---|---|---|---|
| 1st place, gold medalist(s) | 30 | Michaela Dorfmeister | Austria | 1:32.47 | — |
| 2nd place, silver medalist(s) | 25 | Janica Kostelić | Croatia | 1:32.74 | +0.27 |
| 3rd place, bronze medalist(s) | 29 | Alexandra Meissnitzer | Austria | 1:33.06 | +0.59 |
| 4 | 11 | Kelly Vanderbeek | Canada | 1:33.09 | +0.62 |
| 5 | 16 | Carole Montillet | France | 1:33.31 | +0.84 |
| 6 | 1 | Martina Schild | Switzerland | 1:33.33 | +0.86 |
| 7 | 28 | Lindsey Kildow | United States | 1:33.42 | +0.95 |
| 8 | 14 | Lucia Recchia | Italy | 1:33.48 | +1.01 |
| 9 | 17 | Emily Brydon | Canada | 1:33.50 | +1.03 |
| 9 | 12 | Petra Haltmayr | Germany | 1:33.50 | +1.03 |
| 11 | 20 | Julia Mancuso | United States | 1:33.72 | +1.25 |
| 12 | 27 | Anja Pärson | Sweden | 1:33.88 | +1.41 |
| 13 | 22 | Andrea Fischbacher | Austria | 1:33.97 | +1.50 |
| 14 | 21 | Kirsten Clark | United States | 1:33.98 | +1.51 |
| 15 | 6 | Sylviane Berthod | Switzerland | 1:34.00 | +1.53 |
| 16 | 19 | Martina Ertl-Renz | Germany | 1:34.03 | +1.56 |
| 17 | 10 | Fränzi Aufdenblatten | Switzerland | 1:34.10 | +1.63 |
| 18 | 33 | Urška Rabič | Slovenia | 1:34.12 | +1.65 |
| 19 | 8 | Chemmy Alcott | Great Britain | 1:34.20 | +1.73 |
| 20 | 15 | Geneviève Simard | Canada | 1:34.38 | +1.91 |
| 21 | 34 | Nike Bent | Sweden | 1:34.41 | +1.94 |
| 22 | 3 | Janette Hargin | Sweden | 1:34.48 | +2.01 |
| 23 | 49 | Dagný L. Kristjánsdóttir | Iceland | 1:34.56 | +2.09 |
| 24 | 5 | Jessica Lindell-Vikarby | Sweden | 1:34.78 | +2.31 |
| 25 | 38 | Marie Marchand-Arvier | France | 1:34.82 | +2.35 |
| 26 | 23 | Renate Götschl | Austria | 1:34.83 | +2.36 |
| 27 | 43 | Šárka Záhrobská | Czech Republic | 1:34.98 | +2.51 |
| 28 | 13 | Libby Ludlow | United States | 1:35.01 | +2.54 |
| 29 | 32 | Petra Robnik | Slovenia | 1:35.10 | +2.63 |
| 30 | 4 | Carolina Ruiz Castillo | Spain | 1:35.20 | +2.73 |
| 31 | 7 | Daniela Ceccarelli | Italy | 1:35.26 | +2.79 |
| 32 | 18 | Ingrid Jacquemod | France | 1:35.28 | +2.81 |
| 33 | 35 | Tina Weirather | Liechtenstein | 1:35.34 | +2.87 |
| 34 | 39 | Sherry Lawrence | Canada | 1:35.47 | +3.00 |
| 35 | 26 | Nadia Styger | Switzerland | 1:35.57 | +3.10 |
| 36 | 37 | Lucie Hrstková | Czech Republic | 1:35.62 | +3.15 |
| 37 | 31 | María José Rienda Contreras | Spain | 1:36.03 | +3.56 |
| 38 | 9 | Nadia Fanchini | Italy | 1:36.46 | +3.99 |
| 39 | 24 | Tina Maze | Slovenia | 1:36.64 | +4.17 |
| 40 | 36 | Nika Fleiss | Croatia | 1:36.65 | +4.18 |
| 41 | 40 | Alexandra Coletti | Monaco | 1:37.02 | +4.55 |
| 42 | 48 | Olesya Alieva | Russia | 1:37.12 | +4.65 |
| 43 | 41 | Jelena Lolović | Serbia and Montenegro | 1:37.45 | +4.98 |
| 44 | 46 | Soňa Maculová | Slovakia | 1:37.87 | +5.40 |
| 45 | 44 | Ana Drev | Slovenia | 1:37.92 | +5.45 |
| 46 | 42 | Chirine Njeim | Lebanon | 1:37.93 | +5.46 |
| 47 | 45 | María Belén Simari Birkner | Argentina | 1:38.02 | +5.55 |
| 48 | 54 | Jana Gantnerová | Slovakia | 1:38.40 | +5.93 |
| 49 | 51 | Leyre Morlans | Spain | 1:38.53 | +6.06 |
| 50 | 50 | Macarena Benvenuto | Chile | 1:41.52 | +9.05 |
| 51 | 55 | Christelle Laura Douibi | Algeria | 1:43.54 | +11.07 |
| | 2 | Elena Fanchini | Italy | DNF | |
| | 52 | Daniela Anguita | Chile | DNF | |
| | 53 | Eva Hučková | Slovakia | DSQ | |
| | 47 | Macarena Simari Birkner | Argentina | DNS | |
| | 56 | Kirsten McGarry | Ireland | DNS | |
