= Lazhari =

Lazhari (Arabic: لزهاري) is a surname. Notable people with the surname include:

- Larbi Lazhari (born 1941), Algerian gymnast
- Mohamed Lazhari (born 1938), French and Algerian gymnast
