= Guerri =

Guerri is a surname. Notable people with the surname include:

- Kamel Guerri (born 1968), Algerian alpine skier
- Mourad Guerri (born 1975), Algerian alpine skier
- Ruth Guerri, American actress
- Sergio Guerri (1905–1992), Italian Roman Catholic Cardinal
- Simone Guerri (born 1982), Italian footballer
