= African Gymnastics Union =

International sports governing body

African Gymnastics Union UAG
- Sport: Gymnastics
- Official website: www.unionafricainedegymnastique.com

History
- Year of formation: 20 October 1990; 35 years ago in Algiers, Algeria

Demographics
- Membership size: 24 members

Affiliations
- International federation: International Gymnastics Federation (FIG)
- FIG member since: 1990
- Other affiliation(s): Association of National Olympic Committees of Africa

Governance
- President: (Egypt) Ehab Amin Esawy

Headquarters
- Address: Center for Sports Federations, Algiers
- Country: Algeria
- Secretary General: (Egypt) Mohamed Hesham
- Official language(s): English

The African Gymnastics Union (UAG) is the governing body of gymnastics in Africa. It is one of the five continental confederations making up the International Gymnastics Federation (FIG). AGU was formed in 20 October 1990 during the 1990 African Artistic Gymnastics Championships in Algiers (Algeria) with Algeria, Côte d'Ivoire, Egypt, Morocco, Namibia, Nigeria, Tunisia and Zimbabwe being the founder members. UAG has headquarters in Algiers and consists of 24 member federations.

== History ==
Following a series of discussions and meetings in Tunis in 1988, the African Gymnastics Union (UAG) was officially established on 20 October 1990, in Algiers, Algeria, during the first African Artistic Gymnastics Championships under the french name of Union Africaine de Gymnastique. The inaugural General Assembly brought together eight federations (Algeria, Ivory Coast, Egypt, Morocco, Namibia, Niger, Tunisia, and Zimbabwe).

In 1990, the Algerian former gymnast, Mohamed Lazhari was appointed the first president of the African Gymnastics Union.

== Tournaments ==
- African Artistic Gymnastics Championships
- African Rhythmic Gymnastics Championships
- African Trampoline Championships
- Aerobic Gymnastics African Championships
- African Games (Gymnastics tournaments)

== Members ==
- Algeria
- Angola
- Benin
- Burkina Faso
- Cape Verde
- Cameroon
- (Republic of the Congo) Congo
- Egypt
- Eswatini
- Ethiopia
- Libya
- Madagascar
- Mauritius
- Morocco
- Mozambique
- Namibia
- Nigeria
- Senegal
- Seychelles
- South Africa
- Sudan
- Tunisia
- Uganda
- Zimbabwe
