= Algeria at the 2006 Winter Olympics =

- IOC code: ALG
- NOC: Algerian Olympic Committee
- Website: www.coa.dz

in Turin
- Competitors: 2 in 2 sports
- Flag bearers: Christelle Laura Douibi (opening); Noureddine Maurice Bentoumi (closing)
- Medals: Gold 0 Silver 0 Bronze 0 Total 0

Winter Olympics appearances (overview)
- 1992; 1994–2002; 2006; 2010; 2014–2026

Other related appearances
- France (1924–pres.)

Algeria sent a delegation to compete at the 2006 Winter Olympics in Turin, Italy from 10 to 26 February 2006. The nation had participated in the Winter Olympics only once previously, in 1992. The delegation consisted of two athletes, Christelle Laura Douibi in alpine skiing and Noureddine Maurice Bentoumi in cross-country skiing. Douibi's 40th-place finish in the women's downhill was Algeria's best finish in these Olympics.

== Background ==
Algeria made its Winter Olympic Games debut at the 1992 Winter Olympics in Albertville, France. The country was absent from the next three Winter Olympics, returning 14 years later for these Turin Games. Although Algeria has won medals in the Summer Olympics, no Algerian athlete has ever won a medal at a Winter Games. Algeria's delegation to Turin consisted of two athletes, Christelle Laura Douibi in alpine skiing and Noureddine Maurice Bentoumi in cross-country skiing. Douibi was the flag bearer for the opening ceremony, while Bentoumi was chosen to carry the flag for the closing ceremony.

== Alpine skiing ==
Christelle Laura Douibi was 20 years old at the time of the Turin Olympics, her first, and so far only participation in Olympic competition. On 15 February she participated in the women's downhill; she finished in a time of 2 minutes and 9 seconds, 40th and last out of those who completed the race. She was approximately 13 seconds behind the gold medalist. On 20 February she took part in the women's super-G, finishing in a time of 1 minute and 43 seconds, which placed her 51st and last in the competition. Her time was 11 seconds behind the gold medalist. She dedicated her performance to her father, Mohammed, who had died 18 months prior to the Olympics.

Athlete	Event	Final	
Athlete	Event	Time	Rank
Christelle Laura Douibi	Women's downhill	2:09.68	40
Christelle Laura Douibi	Women's super-G	1:43.54	51

== Cross-country skiing ==
Noureddine Maurice Bentoumi, the lone Algerian cross-country skier in Turin, was 33 years old at the time of these Olympics, and he was making his Olympic debut. On 26 February, he took part in the men's 50 km freestyle. He was more than 5 minutes behind the leader after 10 kilometres of the event, and did not complete the race, retiring between the 10 and 26.6 kilometre checkpoints.

Distance

Athlete	Event	Final	
Athlete	Event	Total	Rank
Noureddine Maurice Bentoumi	Men's 50 km freestyle	Did not finish	
