= Algeria at the 1992 Winter Olympics =

- IOC code: ALG
- NOC: Algerian Olympic Committee
- Website: www.coa.dz

in Albertville
- Competitors: 4 in 1 sport
- Flag bearer: Nacera Boukamoum
- Medals: Gold 0 Silver 0 Bronze 0 Total 0

Winter Olympics appearances (overview)
- 1992; 1994–2002; 2006; 2010; 2014–2026

Other related appearances
- France (1924–pres.)

Algeria competed in the Winter Olympic Games for the first time at the 1992 Winter Olympics in Albertville, France.

They failed to win any medals.

== Competitors ==
The following is the list of number of competitors in the Games.

Sport	Men	Women	Total
Alpine skiing	3	1	4
Total	3	1	4

== Alpine skiing ==
Men

Athlete	Event	Race 1	Race 2	Total	
Athlete	Event	Time	Time	Time	Rank
Mourad Guerri	Super-G			1:32.76	83
Kamel Guerri	Super-G			1:38.94	90
Kamel Guerri	Giant Slalom			3:03.77	80
Mourad Guerri	Giant Slalom			3:20.33	85
Mourad Guerri	Slalom	DNF	–	DNF	–
Allaoua Latef	Slalom	DNF	–	DNF	–

Women

Athlete	Event	Race 1	Race 2	Total	
Athlete	Event	Time	Time	Time	Rank
Nacera Boukamoum	Super-G			1:56.07	48
Nacera Boukamoum	Giant Slalom			3:04.46	42
