= Athletics at the 2016 Summer Paralympics – Men's 100 metres T37 =

Men's 100 metres T37 at the XV Paralympic Games
- Venue: Estádio Olímpico João Havelange
- Dates: 10–11 September 2016
- Competitors: 13 from 11 nations

Medalists
1st place, gold medalist(s)		Charl du Toit	South Africa
2nd place, silver medalist(s)		Mostafa Fathalla Mohamed	Egypt
3rd place, bronze medalist(s)		Fanie van der Merwe	South Africa

The T37 category is for ambulant athletes with cerebral palsy. These athletes have movement and coordination problems on one half of their body. They have good ability in their dominant side of their body (ie hemiplegia).

The Athletics at the 2016 Summer Paralympics – Men's 100 metres T37 event at the 2016 Paralympic Games took place on 10–11 September 2016, at the Estádio Olímpico João Havelange.

== Heats ==
=== Heat 1 ===
11:23 10 September 2016:

Rank	Lane	Bib	Name	Nationality	Reaction	Time	Notes
1	7	1143	Mateus Evangelista Cardoso	Brazil		11.47	Q
2	6	2091	Fanie van der Merwe	South Africa		11.52	Q
3	5	2409	Omar Monterola	Venezuela		11.86	Q
4	8	1926	Jelmar Bos	Netherlands		11.93	
5	4	1015	Sofiane Hamdi	Algeria		12.08	
6	3	1038	Mario Tataren	Argentina		12.30	

=== Heat 2 ===
11:31 10 September 2016:

Rank	Lane	Bib	Name	Nationality	Reaction	Time	Notes
1	3	2081	Charl du Toit	South Africa		11.42	WR PR Q
2	7	1409	Mostafa Fathalla Mohamed	Egypt		11.52	Q
3	8	1255	Guangxu Shang	China		11.53	Q
4	5	1510	Rhys Jones	Great Britain		11.77	q
5	2	2326	Andrii Onufriienko	Ukraine		11.91	q
6	6	2383	Ahkeel Whitehead	United States		12.21	
7	4	1156	Paulo Pereira	Brazil		12.23	

== Final ==
10:52 11 September 2016:

Rank	Lane	Bib	Name	Nationality	Reaction	Time	Notes
1st place, gold medalist(s)	4	2081	Charl du Toit	South Africa		11.45	
2nd place, silver medalist(s)	5	1409	Mostafa Fathalla Mohamed	Egypt		11.54	
3rd place, bronze medalist(s)	7	2091	Fanie van der Merwe	South Africa		11.54	
4	6	1143	Mateus Evangelista Cardoso	Brazil		11.62	
5	8	1255	Guangxu Shang	China		11.76	
6	3	1510	Rhys Jones	Great Britain		11.94	
7	2	2326	Andrii Onufriienko	Ukraine		12.13	
8	9	2409	Omar Monterola	Venezuela		12.13	
