= William Aberhart High School =

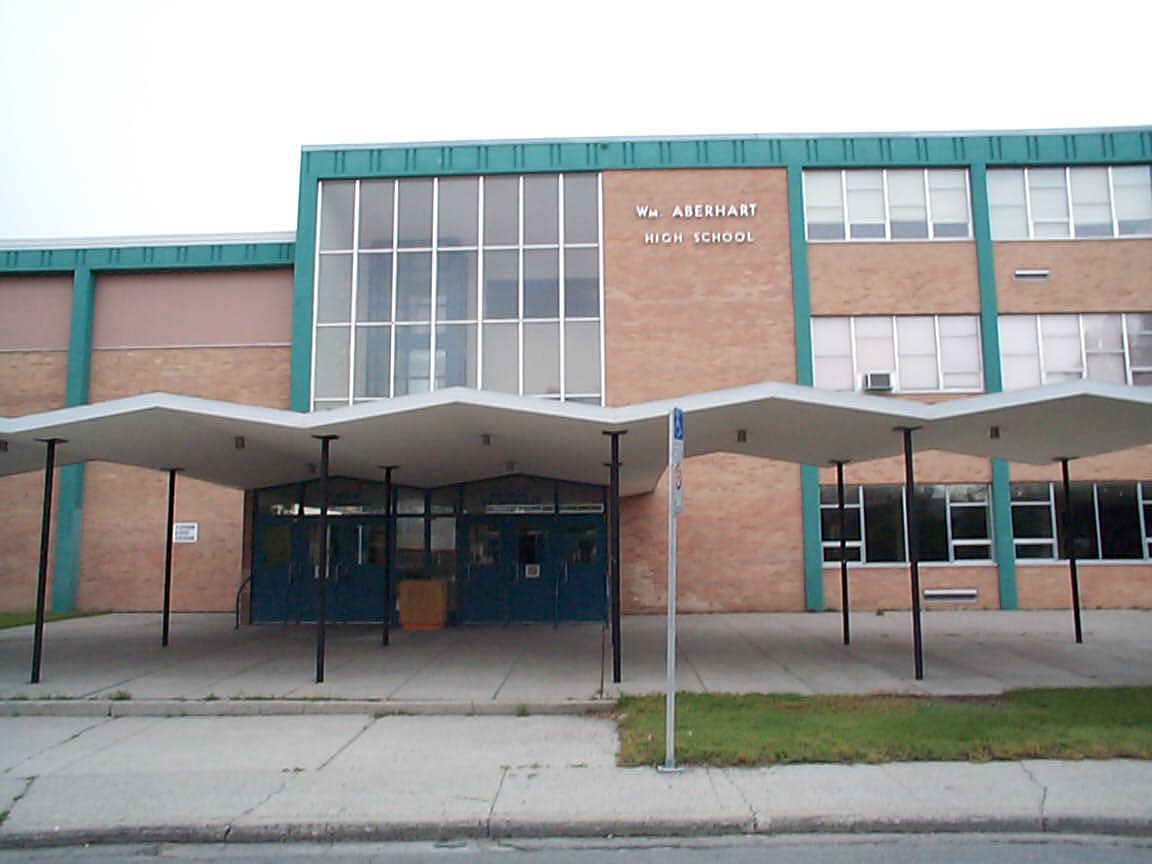

Location
- 3009 Morley Trail NW; Calgary, Alberta, T2M 4G9; Canada; 51.07859°N 114.11535°W

Information
- School type: Public
- Motto: Semper Paratus (Always Prepared)
- Founded: 1957
- School board: Calgary Board of Education
- Superintendent: Naomi Johnson
- Principal: Christos Sagriotis
- Grades: 10–12
- Enrollment: 1340 (2021)
  - Grade 10: 466
  - Grade 11: 414
  - Grade 12: 460
- Language: English, French immersion, Spanish bilingual
- Area: Area II
- Colours: Orange and white
- Mascot: Orange
- Team name: Orange
- Communities served: English Program: Banff Trail, Brentwood (east of Brisebois Dr), Capitol Hill (west of 14 St), Citadel, The Hamptons, Lynx Ridge, Ranchlands, and Triwood (Charleswood and Collingwood). French Immersion Program: Arbour Lake, Banff Trail, Beddington Heights, Bowness, Briar Hill, Brentwood, Bridgeland/Riverside, Cambrian Heights, Capitol Hill, Citadel, Country Hills, Country Hills Village, Coventry Hills, Crescent Heights, Crestmont, Dalhousie, Edgemont, Evanston, Greenview, Greenwood, Greenbriar, The Hamptons, Harvest Hills, Hawkwood, Hidden Valley, Highland Park, Highwood, Hillhurst, Hounsfield Heights, Huntington Hills, Kincora, Lynx Ridge, MacEwan, Montgomery, Mount Pleasant, North Haven, Panorama Hills, Parkdale, Point McKay, Queen's Park Village, Ranchlands, Renfrew, Rocky Ridge, Rosedale, Rosemont, Royal Oak, Sandstone, Scenic Acres, Silver Springs, St. Andrews Heights, Sunnyside, Thorncliffe, Triwood (Collingwood, Charleswood), Tuscany, Tuxedo Park, University Heights, Valley Ridge, Varsity, West Hillhurst, and Winston Heights/Mountview.
- Feeder schools: English Program: Senator Patrick Burns. French Immersion Program: Georges P. Vanier, Valley Creek, and Branton.
- Website: schools.cbe.ab.ca/b829/

William Aberhart High School is a public senior high school in Calgary, Alberta, Canada, which teaches grades 10, 11, and 12. It is operated by the Calgary Board of Education. It is a comprehensive English and French Immersion school of 1300 students. William Aberhart High School is located at 3009 Morley Trail NW. The school contains 54 classrooms, two gymnasiums, a fitness centre, a multi-media library resource centre, and specialized areas for music, and art. It also plays host to a debate union. Other school activities and clubs include the largest high school Model United Nations team in Calgary; the most frequently published school newspaper in Southern Alberta, The Advocate; an independent students' media magazine, The Iconographer; an environmentally active organization, Destination Conservation; the Student Outreach Society, a peer support group; a bilingual club, Immersion en Action; and many others.

Until 2005, the east side of the third floor was populated by the National Sports School of Canada. They have since moved west to Canada Olympic Park.

== Curriculum ==
William Aberhart High School offers a French Immersion program.

=== Special programs ===
Several special programs offered by William Aberhart High School include:

- Access and ALP4 programs - The Access program provides students with a wide range of learning experiences. Students learn life skills and take part in many activities both in and out of the school. The ALP4 program is an academic program for students with special needs. Students integrate into classes, and are also involved in community work experience with the VRRI.
- Advanced Placement (AP) Education - William Aberhart High School is one of the few schools in the Calgary area which offers Advanced Placement classes for talented students. These include AP Biology, AP Calculus (self-paced), AP Chemistry, AP Comparative Government & Politics, AP English Literature & Composition, AP French Language, AP Physics (self-paced), AP Fine Arts, and many other programs.

The school is part of the Action for Bright Children Society.

=== Fine Arts Program ===
The fine arts program at William Aberhart High School consists of several groups:

- The Concert Choir (which consists of full-time choir students and after-school participants);
- The Jazz Choir (full- and part-time choir students, through a competitive process);
- The Concert Band (composed of Grade 10 students);
- The Symphonic Band (consisting of grade 11 and 12's)
- The Jazz Band (open class - grades 10 through 12);
- The Wind Ensemble (an advanced concert band, which plays Grade 4+ band music);
- Beginner Strings (a beginner class for string players, grades 10 through 12)
- Advanced Strings (an advanced class for string players, grades 10 through 12)
- Musical Theater (an elective, one semester course in which the students perform a musical at the end of the term)
- Advanced Acting (a class in which students in grades 10, 11 and 12 rehearse and present a play. Usually the fall play is a full length play, where the spring play is a one act play that goes to the Calgary High School Drama Festival .)

All of the school's ensembles and bands frequently achieve superior ratings at the Kiwanis Music Festival. Aberhart's symphonic band is one of both Calgary and Alberta's top ranking high school ensembles.

The Concert Choir and Symphonic Band both travel, at both a national and international level, competing and performing at a variety of venues, as well as taking in local music, such as excursions to the Berlin Philharmonic, amongst others.

== Extracurricular activities and clubs ==
=== Clubs ===
Competitive	Service	Academic	Other
Debate Union; Intramural Activities; Science Olympics; Swim and Dive Team; Cross Country Team; Model U. N.	Social Amnesty Club; The Advocate; The Iconographer; Destination Conservation (environmental); Student Leadership Activities; Yearbook; Graduation Committee; Art Enrichment; Dead Poets Society; Immersion en Action; Queer-Straight Alliance	Filmfest; Robotics club; Global Cultures Club; Anime Club; Archery Club; Badminton Club; Grad Fashion Show; Choral; Harry Potter Club; Drama Company; Theater Club; Battle of the Bands; Improv Club	Yoga; Super Smash Bros. Club

==== Debate Union ====
William Aberhart High School has the largest youth debate union in western Canada. The debate team has been highly successful, winning many competitions in Calgary, Alberta and Canada as a whole. Students from Aberhart's debate union have been selected many times to not only represent Aberhart, but also Alberta at the national level. On an international level, Aberhart has placed in the top five in events such as the European Schools Debating Championships, North American / Oxford Cup Debate Championships, Oxford Union Schools Debating Competition, International Independent Schools Public Speaking Championships, World Individual Debating and Public Speaking Championships, Pan American Debate Championships, and the World Schools Debating Championships.

==== Social Amnesty ====
A student run club that makes its focus on raising awareness in humanitarianism. The club is composed of a group of compassionate students desiring to make a difference in world crisis and injustice. So far the club has run campaigns on clean water, human rights in Burma, and homeless shelter relief during the 2007-2008 school year. Social Amnesty also organized and hosted a "Darfur week" in the 2008-2009 school year.

==== The Advocate ====
Aberhart's school paper that publishes bi-weekly throughout the school year. The paper mainly covers athletics, student opinions, and school events. The Advocate is the most published student newspaper in western Canada.

==== The Iconographer ====
The Advocate was Aberhart's school arts and literature magazine which was published exclusively by students on a regular basis. It featured mainly poems and photography, but also included short stories, among other things. Its publication schedule depended entirely on how many submissions they received from the student body at the school.

The Advocate was followed by "The Issue" and became focused on education reform. Many of the people involved were part of E.Y.E. (Educational Youth Enterprises), a citywide movement to improve education practices and promote "Free Schools".

=== Athletics ===
Coed	Male	Female
Badminton team; Badminton club; Cross country; Swimming and Diving; Track and field	Basketball, junior; Basketball, senior; Football, junior; Football, senior; Soccer, junior; Soccer, senior: Volleyball, junior; Volleyball, senior; Wrestling; Rugby union, Junior; Rugby, Senior	Basketball, junior; Basketball, senior; Field Hockey, junior; Field Hockey, senior; Soccer, junior; Soccer, senior; Volleyball, junior; Volleyball, senior; Wrestling; Rugby

== Notable alumni ==
- James Gosling - father of the JAVA Programming Language - Order of Canada Recipient
- Paul Gowsell - Curler. 1976 and 1978 World Junior Champion and 1980 Alberta Champion
- James Lawrence - Endurance athlete. First person to finish 50 Ironman triathlons in 50 days in 50 US States.
- Todd McFarlane - comics artist and creator of the series Spawn.
- Shannon-Ogbnai Abeda - 2018 Winter Olympian and first athlete to represent Eritrea in the Winter Olympics
- David Winning - Film and television director known for his work in science fiction and thrillers.

== See also ==
- William Aberhart
- Calgary Board of Education
