= 1990 African Artistic Gymnastics Championships =

1st edition of the Championships

The first edition of the African Artistic Gymnastics Championships took place in October 1990 in Algiers, Algeria. The competition, held at La Coupole, concluded on October 26, 1990, and marked the establishment of the African Gymnastics Union, with Algerian Mohamed Lazhari being appointed as its first president. The Moroccan team was crowned the African team champions, with Algeria securing the second place in the team competition.
