= Charl du Toit =

South African Paralympic sprinter

Personal information
- Born: 26 March 1993 (age 33) Pretoria, South Africa
- Spouse: Chantell Du Toit

Sport
- Country: South Africa
- Sport: Track and field
- Disability class: T37
- Event: Sprints
- Club: Maties ParaSport Club
- Coached by: Suzanne Ferreira

Achievements and titles
- Paralympic finals: 2012, 2016
Medal record
Men's para athletics (track and field)
Representing South Africa
Paralympic Games
Gold medal – first place	2016 Rio	100m T37
Gold medal – first place	2016 Rio	400m T37
IPC World Championships
Gold medal – first place	2017 London	200m - T37
Gold medal – first place	2017 London	400m - T37
Silver medal – second place	2013 Lyon	4x100m relay
Silver medal – second place	2015 Doha	400m - T37
Silver medal – second place	2017 London	100m - T37
Bronze medal – third place	2013 Lyon	400m - T37
Bronze medal – third place	2013 Lyon	800m - T37

Charl du Toit (born 26 March 1993) is a South African former Paralympic sprinter who competed in the T37 class. Du Toit has competed at two Summer Paralympic Games, London 2012 and Rio 2016. At the 2016 Summer Olympics he won gold medals in the 100 metre and 400 metre races, setting a world record in the latter.

== Personal history ==
Du Toit was born in Pretoria, South Africa in 1993. He has cerebral palsy. Du Toit was educated at Hoërskool Akasia in his home city. After matriculating from high school he attended Stellenbosch University.
