= Fanie van der Merwe =

South African Paralympic athlete

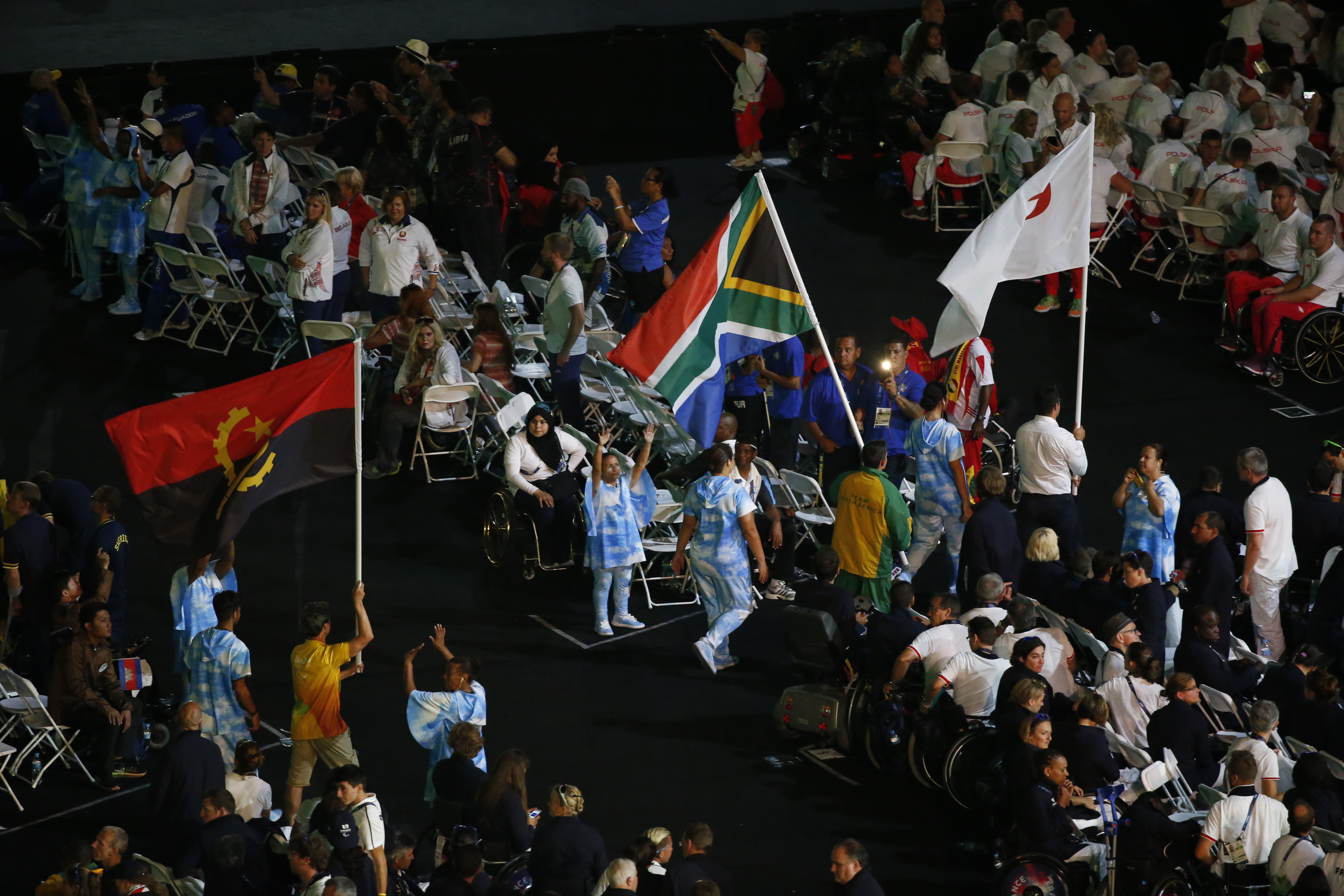

Personal information
- Born: 25 February 1986 (age 40)
Medal record
Men's para athletics
Representing South Africa
Paralympic Games
Gold medal – first place	2008 Beijing	100 m T37
Gold medal – first place	2008 Beijing	200 m T37
Gold medal – first place	2012 London	100 m T37
Bronze medal – third place	2016 Rio	100 m T37
IPC World Championships
Silver medal – second place	2006 Assen	200 m T37
Silver medal – second place	2011 Christchurch	100 m T37
Silver medal – second place	2011 Christchurch	200 m T37
Silver medal – second place	2013 Lyon	200 m T37
Silver medal – second place	2013 Lyon	4 × 100 m T35–38
Silver medal – second place	2015 Doha	100 m T37
Bronze medal – third place	2011 Christchurch	400 m T37
Bronze medal – third place	2015 Doha	200 m T37
All-Africa Games
Gold medal – first place	2011 Maputo	200 m T37
Gold medal – first place	2015 Brazzaville	100 m T37
Commonwealth Games
Gold medal – first place	2014 Glasgow	100 m T37

Fanie van der Merwe OIS (born 25 February 1986) is a Paralympic athlete from South Africa competing mainly in category T37 sprint events.

He competed in the 2008 Summer Paralympics in Beijing, China. There he won a gold medal in the men's 100 metres – T37 event and a gold medal in the men's 200 metres – T37 event. He also competed in the 2012 Summer Paralympics in London where he defended his 100 m T37 gold medal.
