= South African Gymnastics Federation =

Overall governing body of the sports of gymnastics in South Africa

South Africa Gymnastics Federation
- Sport: Gymnastics
- Jurisdiction: South Africa
- Abbreviation: SAGF
- Founded: 1931
- Affiliation: IFG
- Regional affiliation: African Gymnastics Union
- Headquarters: Suite E11, Clairview Business Park 236 Imam Haron Road Claremont 7708 Cape Town
- President: Donny Jurgens

Official website
- www.sagf.co.za
- (South Africa)

The South African Gymnastics Federation is the overall governing body of the sports of gymnastics in South Africa. Established in 1931, the body is affiliated to the International Federation of Gymnastics, the African Gymnastics Union and the South African Sports Confederation and Olympic Committee (SASCOC), and recognized by Sport and Recreation South Africa (SRSA).

The SAGF governs nine gymnastics disciplines as follows:

- Men's Artistic Gymnastics
- Women's Artistic Gymnastics
- Rhythmic Gymnastics
- Aerobic Gymnastics
- Acrobatic Gymnastics
- Trampoline & Tumbling
- Rope Skipping
- Gym for All (GFA)
- Schools Gymnastics

The SAGF is involved from the grassroots development level to the elite gymnastics level in all the 9 Provinces of South Africa, in partnership with its provincial affiliates.
