= Athletics at the 2016 Summer Paralympics – Men's 400 metres T37 =

Men's 400 metres T37 at the XV Paralympic Games
- Venue: Estádio Olímpico João Havelange
- Dates: 15–16 September 2016
- Competitors: 12 from 9 nations

Medalists
| 1st place, gold medalist(s) | | Charl du Toit | South Africa |
| 2nd place, silver medalist(s) | | Omar Monterola | Venezuela |
| 3rd place, bronze medalist(s) | | Sofiane Hamdi | Algeria |

The T37 category is for ambulant athletes with cerebral palsy. These athletes have movement and coordination problems on one half of their body. They have good ability in their dominant side of their body (ie hemiplegia).

The Athletics at the 2016 Summer Paralympics – Men's 400 metres T37 event at the 2016 Paralympic Games took place on 15–16 September 2016, at the Estádio Olímpico João Havelange.

== Heats ==
=== Heat 1 ===
11:45 15 September 2016:

| Rank | Lane | Bib | Name | Nationality | Reaction | Time | Notes |
|---|---|---|---|---|---|---|---|
| 1 | 6 | 2081 | Charl du Toit | South Africa | | 55.28 | Q |
| 2 | 8 | 1263 | Jialong Wu | China | | 55.54 | Q |
| 3 | 3 | 1404 | Mohamed Abdellatef | Egypt | | 56.27 | Q |
| 4 | 7 | 1035 | Mariano Dominguez | Argentina | | 57.85 | |
| | 5 | 1669 | Paul Keogan | Ireland | | | DSQ |
| | 4 | 1143 | Mateus Evangelista Cardoso | Brazil | | | DSQ |

=== Heat 2 ===
11:52 15 September 2016:

| Rank | Lane | Bib | Name | Nationality | Reaction | Time | Notes |
|---|---|---|---|---|---|---|---|
| 1 | 5 | 2409 | Omar Monterola | Venezuela | | 53.38 | Q |
| 2 | 7 | 1409 | Mostafa Fathalla Mohamed | Egypt | | 54.27 | Q |
| 3 | 6 | 1015 | Sofiane Hamdi | Algeria | | 54.28 | Q |
| 4 | 8 | 1156 | Paulo Pereira | Brazil | | 54.36 | q |
| 5 | 3 | 1469 | Valentin Bertrand | France | | 55.85 | q |
| 6 | 4 | 1255 | Guangxu Shang | China | | 58.12 | |

== Final ==
10:23 16 September 2016:

| Rank | Lane | Bib | Name | Nationality | Reaction | Time | Notes |
|---|---|---|---|---|---|---|---|
| 1st place, gold medalist(s) | 4 | 2081 | Charl du Toit | South Africa | | 51.13 | |
| 2nd place, silver medalist(s) | 6 | 2409 | Omar Monterola | Venezuela | | 52.93 | |
| 3rd place, bronze medalist(s) | 7 | 1015 | Sofiane Hamdi | Algeria | | 53.01 | |
| 4 | 3 | 1409 | Mostafa Fathalla Mohamed | Egypt | | 53.43 | |
| 5 | 1 | 1156 | Paulo Pereira | Brazil | | 54.67 | |
| 6 | 5 | 1263 | Jialong Wu | China | | 55.51 | |
| 7 | 8 | 1404 | Mohamed Abdellatef | Egypt | | 55.61 | |
| 8 | 2 | 1469 | Valentin Bertrand | France | | 55.72 | |
