= Athletics at the 2008 Summer Paralympics – Men's 800 metres T13 =

The Men's 800m T13 had its Final held on September 15 at 17:34.

== Medalists ==
| Gold | Abdelillah Mame; Morocco |
| Silver | Peter Gottwald Jr; United States |
| Bronze | Zine Eddine Sekhri; Algeria |

== Results ==
| Place | Athlete | Final |
|---|---|---|
| 1 | Abdelillah Mame (MAR) | 1:54.78 PR |
| 2 | Peter Gottwald Jr (USA) | 1:55.49 |
| 3 | Zine Eddine Sekhri (ALG) | 1:55.90 |
| 4 | Rachid Ait Mala (MAR) | 1:55.90 |
| 5 | Luis Sanchez (VEN) | 1:55.98 |
| 6 | Tim Prendergast (NZL) | 1:56.28 |
| 7 | Nelson Ned Pereira (BRA) | 2:02.81 |
| 8 | Manuel Beeler (SUI) | 2:03.08 |
