= Algeria at the 1964 Summer Olympics =

- IOC code: ALG (AGR used at these Games)
- NOC: Algerian Olympic Committee

in Tokyo
- Competitors: 1 in 1 sport
- Flag bearer: Mohamed Lazhari
- Medals: Gold 0 Silver 0 Bronze 0 Total 0

Summer Olympics appearances (overview)
- 1964; 1968; 1972; 1976; 1980; 1984; 1988; 1992; 1996; 2000; 2004; 2008; 2012; 2016; 2020; 2024

Other related appearances
- France (1896–1960)

Algeria sent a delegation to compete at the 1964 Summer Olympics in Tokyo, Japan, from 10 to 24 October 1964. This was the first time Algeria participated in the Olympics Games after gaining independence from France in 1962. Before independence, during the French Algeria period, Algerian athletes participated in the French team. The delegation consisted of one athlete, gymnast Mohamed Lazhari. He participated in the men's artistic individual all-around and finished in 91st position.

== Background ==
Algeria gained independence from France on 3 July 1962 after the Algerian War. Prior to this, Algerian athletes competed as part of French delegations. The Algerian Olympic Committee (COA) was established on 18 October 1963 and gained International Olympic Committee (IOC) recognition on 27 January 1964 during the IOC session in Innsbruck, Austria, just months before the Tokyo Games. This allowed Algeria to make its Olympic debut as an independent nation. Algeria's delegation in 1964 consisted of a single athlete, gymnast Mohamed Lazhari, who also served as the flag bearer during the opening ceremony on 10 October 1964.

== Competitors ==
The following is a list of the number of competitors participating at the Games per sport/discipline.

Sport	Men	Women	Total
Gymnastics	1	0	1
Total	1	0	1

== Gymnastics ==
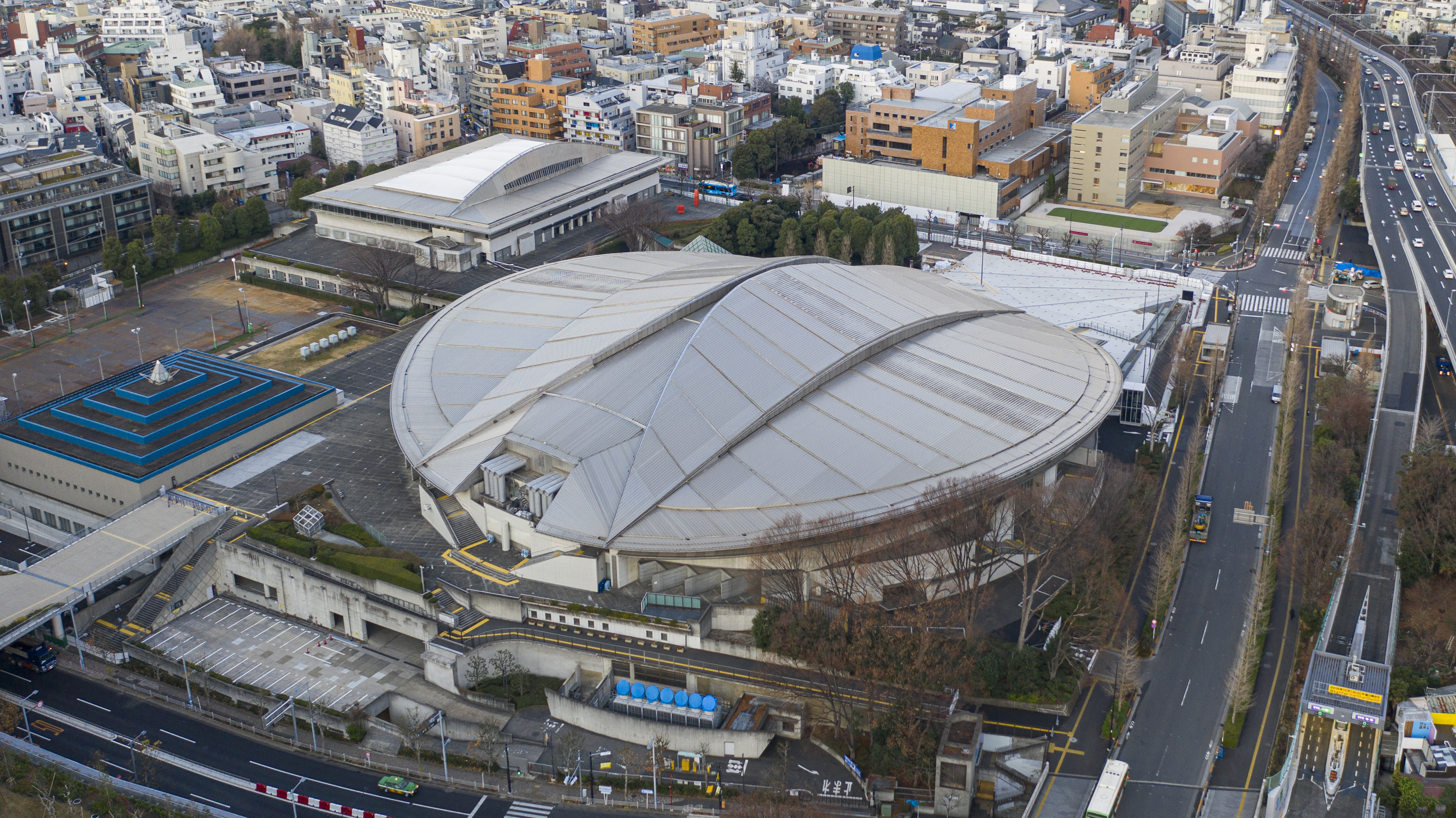
Tokyo Metropolitan Gymnasium, where the gymnastics events were held.

Men's individual all-around

Mohamed Lazhari was 26 years old at the time of Tokyo Olympics. He had previously competed for the French team at the 1960 Rome Olympics. After Algeria's independence, Lazhari chose to represent his birth country, becoming its first Olympic athlete. In Tokyo, he competed in the men's individual all-around on 18–20 October 1964 at the Tokyo Metropolitan Gymnasium, but did not advance to any apparatus finals as only the top six performers on each apparatus qualified. His best result was 60th in the rings with the score 18 out of 20, tied with Georgi Mirtchev from Bulgaria.

Lazhari's younger brother, Larbi Lazhari, later represented Algeria in the 1968 Mexico Olympics.

Athlete	Event	F	V	PB	HB	R	PH	Final	Rank	Ref.
Mohamed Lazhari	Result	17.40	18.65	18.20	16.70	18.00	18.00	106.95	91	
Mohamed Lazhari	Rank	99	77	79	111	60	72	106.95	91	
