= Eucharia Iyiazi =

Nigerian Paralympic athlete

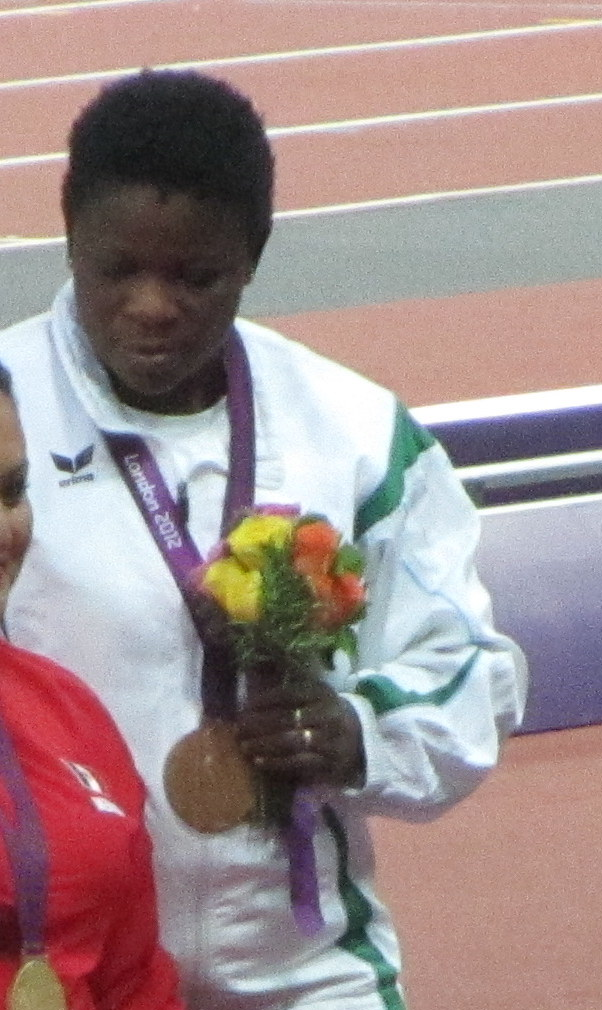
- Iyiazi at London 2012 Summer Paralympics

Personal information
- Full name: Eucharia Njideka Iyiazi
- Born: 19 November 1973 (age 52)
Medal record
Women's para-athletics
Representing Nigeria
Paralympic Games
Gold medal – first place	2008 Beijing	Discus Throw - F57/58
Gold medal – first place	2008 Beijing	Shot Put - F57/58
Bronze medal – third place	2012 Rio de Janeiro	Shot Put - F57/58
Bronze medal – third place	2016 Rio de Janeiro	Discus Throw - F57
Bronze medal – third place	2020 Tokyo	Shot put - F57
Commonwealth Games
Gold medal – first place	2022 Birmingham	Shot put - F57

Eucharia Njideka Iyiazi (born 19 November 1973) is a Paralympian athlete from Nigeria competing mainly in category F57/58 shot put and discus throw events. She has competed at four Paralympics taking two gold and three bronze medals.

Iyiazi competed in the 2008 Summer Paralympics in Beijing, China. There, she won a gold medal in both the women's shot put F57/F58 event and the women's discus throw F57/F58 event. At the Beijing Paralympics, Iyiazi set the world and Paralympic record for the F58 class in shot put and discus.

Iyiazi took a bronze medal in the 2012 Summer Paralympics in London. She threw 27.54 meters to again take the discus bronze at the 2016 Summer Paralympics. She won a bronze medal at 2020 Summer paralympic games.

She won a gold medal in the women's F55-57 shot put at the 2022 Commonwealth Games (CWG) in Birmingham on 6 August 2022 with a throw of 10.03meters. It was Nigeria's eighth gold medal at the 2022 CWG.
