= National Sport School (Canada) =

Location
- 88 Canada Olympic Drive SW; Calgary, Alberta; Canada; 51.0844°N 114.2225°W

Information
- School type: Public (Canada)
- Founded: 1994 (2011- new location)
- School board: Palliser Regional Division No. 26
- Superintendent: Tom Hamer
- Principal: Rob Jewan
- Grades: 8-12
- Enrollment: 513 (September 2025)
- Website: www.nationalsportschool.ca

The National Sport School (NSS) is a public high school (secondary school) in Calgary, Alberta which teaches grades 8 through 12. In partnership with Winsport Canada, the school was created to support student athletes with Olympic potential. Developmental and competitive athletes (current and potential) are able to train and travel internationally, while staying in school. It was founded in 1994 as the first national sport school in the country.

In 2003, NSS moved from its prior location at William Aberhart High School, into the northwest corner of the building housing Ernest Manning High School. In September 2011, the NSS moved from Ernest Manning to Canada Olympic Park in the Athletic & Ice Complex due to the old Ernest Manning location closing for LRT construction. The National Sport School is now located in the Markin MacPhail Centre at WinSport, next to training centers, ice rinks, and the Calgary Gymnastics Centre.

== Special accommodations ==
An athlete's schedule is handled, by allowing students to enter or exit the program throughout the year, without losing credit for work already done (which would occur in a normal 2x5-month semester program). There is a low student-teacher ratio, for added attention. Also, on average, students have access to three computers each, including laptops. Students can remotely stay in contact with their teachers, even when away on holidays in a school setting where the school district does no longer competitions.

== Calgary's Olympic legacy ==
The school is physically located to be sufficiently close to major sports facilities within Calgary, many of which were built for the 1988 Winter Olympics held in Calgary. CODA was the organization that ran those Olympics, and their support for the school, is intended to be part of the legacy of those games (along with the sports facilities).

== Notable alumni ==
This section may include current and past students of the school (whether they graduated or not).

=== International medal winners ===
- Jennifer Botterill - Was on gold medal winning ice hockey team in the 2002 and 2006 Winter Olympics.
- Deidra Dionne - Won bronze in 2002 Winter Olympics in freestyle aerial ski
- Blythe Hartley - Won bronze at 2004 Summer Olympics for diving
- Kaillie Humphries - Won gold medals in two-woman bobsled at the 2010 and 2014 Winter Olympics, and bronze in two-woman bobsled at the 2018 Winter Olympics. Won gold in one-woman bobsled (monobob) at the 2022 Winter Olympics.
- Alanna Kraus - Won bronze at 2002 Winter Olympics and silver at 2006 Winter Olympics in short-track speed skating
- Carla MacLeod - Won gold in ice hockey at the 2006 Winter Olympics
- Jessica Sloan - Won six gold medals at the 2000 Summer Paralympics
- Kyle Shewfelt - Won gold in gymnastics at the 2004 Summer Olympics

=== 2006 Olympics ===
Athletes who have attended the school and competed for Canada at the 2006 Winter Olympics:

Event	Athlete
Alpine Skiing	Shona Rubens; Sherry Lawrence
Short Track Speed Skating	Alanna Kraus
Luge	Alex Gough; Grant Albrecht; Sam Edney; Meaghan Simister; Ian Cockerline
Women's Hockey	Carla MacLeod; Jennifer Botterill
Freestyle Skiing	Deidra Dionne; Kyle Nissen; Warren Shouldice
Ski Jumping	Greg Baxter; Graham Gorham; Stefan Read
Nordic Combined	Jason Myslicki; Max Thompson
Bobsleigh	Kaillie Simundson
Biathlon	Sandra Keith
