= Macarena Benvenuto =

Chilean alpine skier (born 1988)

Personal information
- Born: 15 February 1988 (age 37) Santiago, Chile

Sport
- Sport: Alpine skiing

Macarena Benvenuto (born 15 February 1988) is a Chilean alpine skier. She competed in the women's super-G at the 2006 Winter Olympics.
