= Miriam Vázquez =

Argentine alpine skier (born 1985)

Personal information
- Born: 9 March 1985 (age 40); Buenos Aires, Argentina

Sport
- Sport: Alpine skiing

Miriam Vázquez (born 9 March 1985) is an Argentine alpine skier. She competed in the women's downhill at the 2006 Winter Olympics.
