= Andrea Casasnovas =

Spanish alpine skier (born 1987)

Personal information
- Nationality: Spanish
- Born: 27 August 1987 (age 37); Zaragoza, Spain

Sport
- Sport: Alpine skiing

Andrea Casasnovas (born 27 August 1987) is a Spanish alpine skier. She competed in the women's downhill at the 2006 Winter Olympics.
