= Mostafa Fathalla Mohamed =

Egyptian Paralympian track and field athlete

Sport
- Country: Egypt
- Sport: Paralympic athletics
- Disability class: T37

Achievements and titles
- Paralympic finals: 2016 Rio de Janeiro
Medal record
Men's paralympic athletics
Representing Egypt
Paralympic Games
Silver medal – second place	2016 Rio de Janeiro	100m T37
IPC World Championships
Gold medal – first place	2011 Christchurch	100 m T37

Mostafa Fathalla Mohamed is an Egyptian Paralympic track and field athlete who competes in T37 sprint events.

== Career ==
Mostafa claimed gold medal in the men's 100 m T37 event at the 2011 IPC Athletics World Championships which was also eventually his first medal at the IPC Athletics World Championships. The 2011 IPC Athletics World Championships also marked his maiden appearance at the IPC Athletics World Championships.

He made his debut appearance at the Paralympics representing Egypt at the 2012 Summer Paralympics and competed in the men's 100m T37 and men's 200m T37 events. He claimed a silver medal in his second Paralympic appearance representing Egypt at the 2016 Summer Paralympics in the men's 100m T37 category. In addition, he also took part in the men's 400m T37 event where he narrowly missed out on a bronze medal claiming fourth place.
