= Aerobic Gymnastics African Championships =

- Status: active
- Genre: sporting event
- Frequency: biennial
- Country: varying
- Inaugurated: 2008

The African Aerobic Gymnastics Championships is an African Aerobic Gymnastics competition organized by the African Gymnastics Union held since the year 2010, From the 2014 Edition in Walvis Bay, Namibia The Championship is organized every two year regularly.

== List of Editions ==
Year	Host City	Date	Venue	No. of Athletes	Lead nation (S)	Lead nation (J)
2008	(Namibia) Walvis Bay	December 2008				
2010	(Namibia) Walvis Bay	28 February – 12 March 2010	Jan Wilken Indoor Sports Complex			
2012	(South Africa) Pretoria	8–14 December 2012	Rembrandt Hall, University of Pretoria			
2014	(Namibia) Walvis Bay	27 April – 2 May 2014			South Africa	
2016	(Algeria) Algiers	19–27 March 2016	La Coupole		Algeria	
2018	(Republic of the Congo) Brazzaville	13–14 September 2018	Gymnase Henri-Elendé		Algeria	
2020	(Egypt) Sharm El Sheikh	12–16 March 2020			Egypt	
2022	(Egypt) Cairo	23–24 September 2022			Egypt	Egypt
2024	(Egypt) Cairo	13–15 September 2024			Egypt	Egypt
