= Alpine skiing at the 2006 Winter Olympics – Women's downhill =

Women's downhill at the XX Olympic Winter Games
- Pictogram for alpine skiing
- Venue: San Sicario
- Date: February 15, 2006
- Competitors: 45 from 20 nations
- Winning time: 1:56.49

Medalists
1st place, gold medalist(s)		Michaela Dorfmeister	Austria
2nd place, silver medalist(s)		Martina Schild	Switzerland
3rd place, bronze medalist(s)		Anja Pärson	Sweden

Women's Downhill
- Interactive map of Women's Downhill
- Location: San Sicario; Fraiteve Olympique
- Vertical: 800 m (2,625 ft)
- Top elevation: 2,538 m (8,327 ft)
- Base elevation: 1,738 m (5,702 ft)

The women's downhill of the 2006 Winter Olympics was held at San Sicario, Italy, on Wednesday, 15 February.

Defending Olympic champion Carole Montillet-Carles was nineteenth in the current season's World Cup downhill standings, headed by Michaela Dorfmeister from Austria. Janica Kostelić of Croatia was defending World Champion, but was fourth in the overall World Cup standings, though she did win a downhill at Bad Kleinkirchheim in mid-January.

Dorfmeister won the gold medal, Martina Schild of Switzerland took the silver, and Anja Pärson of Sweden was the bronze medalist. Montillet-Carles finished 28th and Kostelić did not start.

The Fraiteve Olympique course started at an elevation of 2,538 m (8,327 ft) above sea level with a vertical drop of 800 m (2,625 ft) and a course length of 3.058 km (1.90 mi). Dorfmeister's winning time was 116.49 seconds, yielding an average course speed of 94.504 km/h (58.7 mph), with an average vertical descent rate of 6.868 m/s (22.5 ft/s).

== Results ==
Wednesday, 15 February 2006

The race was started at 12:00 local time, (UTC +1). At the starting gate, the skies were mostly cloudy, the temperature was −1.6 °C (29 °F), and the snow condition was hard packed-variable.

Rank	Bib	Name	Country	Time	Difference
1st place, gold medalist(s)	23	Michaela Dorfmeister	Austria	1:56.49	—
2nd place, silver medalist(s)	26	Martina Schild	Switzerland	1:56.86	+0.37
3rd place, bronze medalist(s)	29	Anja Pärson	Sweden	1:57.13	+0.64
4	24	Renate Götschl	Austria	1:57.20	+0.71
5	20	Nadia Styger	Switzerland	1:57.62	+1.13
6	19	Petra Haltmayr	Germany	1:57.69	+1.20
7	28	Julia Mancuso	United States	1:57.71	+1.22
8	31	Lindsey Kildow	United States	1:57.78	+1.29
8	11	Alexandra Meissnitzer	Austria	1:57.78	+1.29
10	22	Nadia Fanchini	Italy	1:57.84	+1.35
11	14	Chemmy Alcott	Great Britain	1:57.85	+1.36
12	25	Fränzi Aufdenblatten	Switzerland	1:57.96	+1.47
13	27	Lucia Recchia	Italy	1:58.30	+1.81
14	3	Sylviane Berthod	Switzerland	1:58.36	+1.87
15	1	Marie Marchand-Arvier	France	1:58.39	+1.90
16	5	Ingrid Jacquemod	France	1:58.46	+1.97
17	18	Janette Hargin	Sweden	1:58.53	+2.04
18	15	Jessica Lindell-Vikarby	Sweden	1:58.56	+2.07
19	16	Stacey Cook	United States	1:58.70	+2.21
20	21	Emily Brydon	Canada	1:58.97	+2.48
21	13	Kirsten Clark	United States	1:59.07	+2.58
22	33	Nike Bent	Sweden	1:59.17	+2.68
23	38	Dagný Kristjánsdóttir	Iceland	1:59.43	+2.94
24	30	Kelly Vanderbeek	Canada	1:59.63	+3.14
25	8	Petra Robnik	Slovenia	1:59.66	+3.17
26	4	Shona Rubens	Canada	2:00.30	+3.81
27	6	Sherry Lawrence	Canada	2:00.47	+3.98
28	34	Carole Montillet-Carles	France	2:01.03	+4.54
29	17	Elena Fanchini	Italy	2:01.06	+4.57
30	2	Carolina Ruiz Castillo	Spain	2:01.09	+4.60
31	35	Alexandra Coletti	Monaco	2:01.34	+4.85
32	9	Daniela Merighetti	Italy	2:01.76	+5.27
33	36	Olesya Alieva	Russia	2:02.06	+5.57
34	37	Chirine Njeim	Lebanon	2:02.86	+6.37
35	39	Soňa Maculová	Slovakia	2:03.63	+7.14
36	42	Jana Gantnerová	Slovakia	2:04.60	+8.11
37	41	Eva Hučková	Slovakia	2:05.32	+8.83
38	43	Andrea Casasnovas	Spain	2:06.73	+10.24
39	44	Miriam Vázquez	Argentina	2:07.42	+10.93
40	45	Christelle Laura Douibi	Algeria	2:09.68	+13.19
	32	Janica Kostelić	Croatia	DNS	
	7	Tina Weirather	Liechtenstein	DNF	
	10	Urška Rabič	Slovenia	DNF	
	12	Elisabeth Görgl	Austria	DNF	
	40	Leire Morlans	Spain	DNF	
