= Algeria at the 2010 Winter Olympics =

- IOC code: ALG
- NOC: Algerian Olympic Committee
- Website: www.coa.dz

in Vancouver
- Competitors: 1 in 1 sport
- Flag bearer: Mehdi-Selim Khelifi (opening)
- Medals: Gold 0 Silver 0 Bronze 0 Total 0

Winter Olympics appearances (overview)
- 1992; 1994–2002; 2006; 2010; 2014–2022; 2026

Other related appearances
- France (1924–)

Algeria sent a delegation to compete at the 2010 Winter Olympics in Vancouver, British Columbia, Canada, held between 12 and 28 February 2010. The country's participation at Vancouver marked its third appearance at a Winter Olympics since its debut in 1992. The delegation consisted of a single cross-country skier, Mehdi-Selim Khelifi. Khelifi competed in the 15 kilometre freestyle event, and finished in 84th place.

Vancouver 2010 marked the first time the Algerian Olympic team competed in Canada as Algeria and other nations boycotted the 1976 Summer Olympics in Montreal due to the IOC's refusal to ban New Zealand.

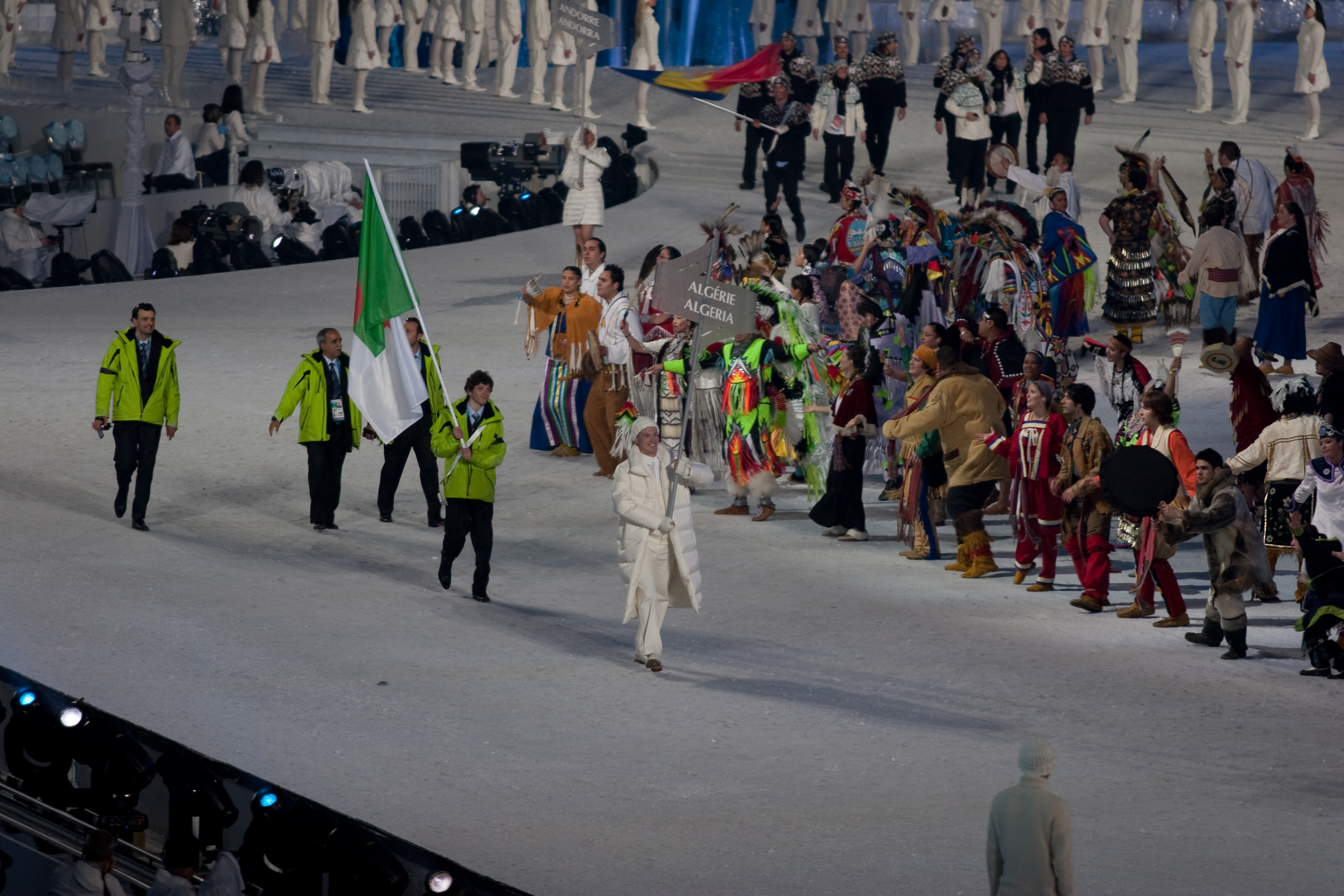
The delegation entering the stadium during the opening ceremonies.

== Background ==
Algeria made its Winter Olympic Games debut at the 1992 Winter Olympics in Albertville, France. The country was absent from the next three Winter Olympics, returning 14 years later for the 2006 Winter Olympics in Turin, Italy. Although Algeria has won medals in the Summer Olympics, no Algerian athlete has ever won a medal at a Winter Games. The nation sent only one athlete to Vancouver, Mehdi-Selim Khelifi, a cross-country skier. Khelifi was selected as the flag bearer in the Parade of Nations during the opening ceremony. Because the delegation had already gone home, an unnamed assistant of the National Olympic Committee carried the flag in the closing ceremony.

== Cross-country skiing ==
Mehdi-Selim Khelifi was 17 years old at the time of the Vancouver Olympics. He was entered into only one event, the 15 kilometre freestyle. The race was held on 15 February 2010, and Khelifi finished with a time of 41 minutes and 38 seconds, roughly eight minutes behind the gold medallist. His time was good for 84th place; there were 95 competitors who finished the race.

Athlete	Event	Final		
Athlete	Event	Time	Deficit	Rank
Mehdi-Selim Khelifi	15 kilometre freestyle	41:38.5	8:02.2	84
