= Algerian Gymnastics Federation =

Sports governing body in Algeria

- Sport: Gymnastics
- Jurisdiction: Algeria
- Abbreviation: FAG
- Founded: 1963
- Affiliation: IFG
- Regional affiliation: African Gymnastics Union
- Headquarters: 39 Rue Ahmed Ouaked, Dely Ibrahim
- Location: Algiers
- President: Dahbia Ayad
- (Algeria)

The Algerian Gymnastics Federation (Arabic: الاتحادية الجزائرية للجمباز) is the overall governing body of the sports of gymnastics in Algeria. Established in 1963, the body is affiliated to the International Federation of Gymnastics and to the African Gymnastics Union. The current president of the federation is Dahbia Ayad.
