= Gymnastics Federation of Nigeria =

Governing body of gymnastics in Nigeria

- Sport: Gymnastics
- Jurisdiction: Nigeria Olympic Committee
- Abbreviation: GFN
- Founded: 1975
- Affiliation: IFG
- Regional affiliation: African Gymnastics Union
- Headquarters: National Stadium, Abuja, Nigeria
- Location: National Stadium Sport Complex
- President: Prince Kelvin E. Erhunwmunse
- Vice president: Mohammed Abba Inuwa
- Secretary: Davies Oludare E.

Official website
- gfn-gymnastics.org
- (Nigeria)

The Gymnastics Federation of Nigeria is the overall governing body of the sports of gymnastics in Nigeria. Established in 1975, the body is affiliated to the International Federation of Gymnastics with the mission of “an all round development of gymnastics in Nigeria and beyond”.
