= Noureddine Bentoumi =

Algerian cross-country skier (born 1972)

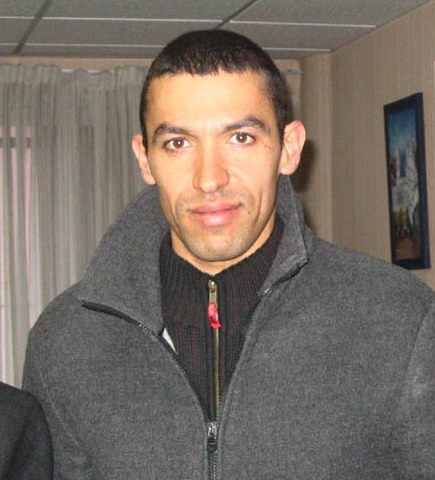
- Bentoumi in 2006

Personal information
- Nationality: Algerian
- Born: 19 February 1972 (age 53)

Sport
- Sport: Cross-country skiing

Noureddine Maurice Bentoumi (born 19 February 1972) is an Algerian former cross-country skier. He competed in the men's 50 kilometre freestyle event at the 2006 Winter Olympics.

== Film ==
Hélène_Vincent#Filmography - Good Luck Algeria - Farid Bentoumi - 2015
