= Athletics at the 2008 Summer Paralympics – Women's shot put F57–58 =

Women's Shot Put F57/58 at the XIII Paralympic Games
- Venue: Beijing National Stadium
- Dates: 9 September
- Competitors: 14 from 10 nations
- Winning distance: 10.96

Medalists
1st place, gold medalist(s)		Eucharia Njideka Iyiazi	Nigeria
2nd place, silver medalist(s)		Angeles Ortiz	Mexico
3rd place, bronze medalist(s)		Nadia Medjemedj	Algeria

The women's shot put F57/58 event at the 2008 Summer Paralympics took place at the Beijing National Stadium at 17:00 on 9 September. There was a single round of competition; after the first three throws, only the top eight had 3 further throws. The competition was won by Eucharia Njideka Iyiazi, representing Nigeria.

== Results ==
Rank	Athlete	Nationality	Cl.	1	2	3	4	5	6	Best	Pts.	Notes
1st place, gold medalist(s)	Eucharia Njideka Iyiazi	Nigeria	F58	10.96	x	x	x	10.68	10.78	10.96	1128	WR
2nd place, silver medalist(s)	Angeles Ortiz	Mexico	F58	10.23	10.35	10.94	10.44	10.51	10.00	10.94	1126	SB
3rd place, bronze medalist(s)	Nadia Medjemedj	Algeria	F57	10.37	x	10.93	10.73	x	x	10.93	1088	WR
4	Stela Eneva	Bulgaria	F58	9.86	10.03	10.23	10.01	10.16	10.28	10.28	1058	
5	Catalina Rosales	Mexico	F58	9.05	9.51	9.27	9.22	9.27	9.46	9.51	978	
6	Ivanka Koleva	Bulgaria	F57	9.44	9.40	9.21	8.59	8.84	8.95	9.44	940	SB
7	Roseane Santos	Brazil	F58	8.91	8.78	8.34	8.72	8.70	9.06	9.06	932	
8	Montazeri Ghahjave	Iran	F58	7.74	9.01	8.51	8.46	8.45	8.84	9.01	927	
9	Safia Djelal	Algeria	F58	7.34	8.91	8.64	-	-	-	8.91	917	SB
10	Nassima Saifi	Algeria	F58	8.45	8.44	8.49	-	-	-	8.49	873	SB
11	Olga Sergienko	Russia	F57	8.24	8.46	8.25	-	-	-	8.46	842	SB
12	Thi Hai Nguyen	Vietnam	F58	5.58	7.23	7.60	-	-	-	7.60	782	
13	Moline Muza	Zimbabwe	F58	6.09	6.74	6.61	-	-	-	6.74	693	
14	Kuong Sio Ieng	Macau	F57	4.90	5.07	5.20	-	-	-	5.20	518	

WR = World Record. SB = Seasonal Best.
