= Nacera Boukamoum =

Algerian alpine skier (born 1971)

Nacera Bukamoum (born 9 May 1971) is an Algerian alpine skier. She competed in the 1992 Winter Olympics in both the women's Super G and Women's Giant slalom. She was the flag bearer for Algeria in the Opening Ceremonies.

Olympic Games
Preceded by Noureddine Tadjine	Flagbearer for Algeria; 1992 Albertville	Succeeded by Karim El-Mahouab
