= Athletics at the 2008 Summer Paralympics – Men's shot put F32 =

The Men's Shot Put F32 had its Final held on September 8 at 17:05.

== Medalists ==
Gold	Karim Betina; Algeria
Silver	Mourad Idoudi; Tunisia
Bronze	Mounir Bakiri; Algeria

== Results ==
Place	Athlete	1	2	3	4	5	6	Best
1	Karim Betina (ALG)	9.58	9.94	10.40	9.45	10.21	10.65	10.65 WR
2	Mourad Idoudi (TUN)	9.81	10.40	6.38	8.95	9.09	9.58	10.40
3	Mounir Bakiri (ALG)	8.16	9.37	7.58	7.61	8.64	9.26	9.37
4	Dimitrios Zisidis (GRE)	7.29	6.82	7.32	7.42	7.93	8.69	8.69
5	Park Se-Ho (KOR)	6.37	6.44	6.01	5.83	6.36	6.93	6.93
6	Frantisek Serbus (CZE)	5.77	x	6.55	x	5.91	6.28	6.55
7	Eoin Thomas Cleare (IRL)	5.74	5.45	5.71	6.11	5.72	5.66	6.11
