= Athletics at the 2008 Summer Paralympics – Men's shot put F40 =

Men's Shot Put F40 at the XIII Paralympic Games
- Venue: Beijing National Stadium
- Dates: 15 September
- Competitors: 14 from 11 nations
- Winning distance: 11.75

Medalists
1st place, gold medalist(s)		Paschalis Stathelakos	Greece
2nd place, silver medalist(s)		Mathias Mester	Germany
3rd place, bronze medalist(s)		Hocine Gherzouli	Algeria

The men's shot put F40 event at the 2008 Summer Paralympics took place at the Beijing National Stadium at 09:50 on 15 September. There was a single round of competition; after the first three throws, only the top eight had 3 further throws. The competition was won by Paschalis Stathelakos of Greece.

== Results ==
Rank	Athlete	Nationality	1	2	3	4	5	6	Best	Notes
1st place, gold medalist(s)	Paschalis Stathelakos	Greece	11.50	10.33	11.42	11.62	11.43	11.75	11.75	WR
2nd place, silver medalist(s)	Mathias Mester	Germany	10.87	10.66	11.16	10.65	10.99	10.73	11.16	
3rd place, bronze medalist(s)	Hocine Gherzouli	Algeria	9.97	10.59	11.08	10.89	10.70	10.55	11.08	SB
4	Alexandros Michail Konstantinidis	Greece	9.91	10.18	10.28	10.58	10.45	9.57	10.58	SB
5	Jonathan de Souza Santos	Brazil	10.42	10.06	9.94	10.12	10.50	10.53	10.53	
6	Marek Margoc	Slovakia	9.90	x	x	9.48	9.71	x	9.90	
7	Denis Slunjski	Croatia	9.20	8.99	9.69	9.83	9.78	9.34	9.83	SB
8	Scott Danberg	United States	9.11	9.60	9.35	9.79	x	9.54	9.79	
9	Fan Chengcheng	China	x	9.49	9.59	-	-	-	9.59	
10	Mohamed El Garaa	Morocco	8.95	9.27	8.83	-	-	-	9.27	
11	Mohamed Amara	Tunisia	8.68	8.67	9.23	-	-	-	9.23	
12	Lutz Langer	Germany	8.81	8.66	9.12	-	-	-	9.12	
13	Ibrahimi Abouchari	Morocco	8.53	8.78	8.52	-	-	-	8.78	
14	Rosel-Clemariot-Christian Nikoua	Central African Republic	8.20	7.81	8.00	-	-	-	8.20	

WR = World Record. SB = Seasonal Best.
