= Athletics at the 2008 Summer Paralympics – Men's 200 metres T37 =

The Men's 200m T37 had its First Round held on September 15 at 10:59 and the Final on September 16 at 17:17.

== Medalists ==
Gold	Fanie van der Merwe; South Africa
Silver	Sofiane Hamdi; Algeria
Bronze	Yuxi Ma; China

== Results ==
Place	Athlete	Round 1	Final
1	Fanie van der Merwe (RSA)	24.04 Q PR	23.84 WR
2	Sofiane Hamdi (ALG)	24.39 Q	24.10
3	Yuxi Ma (CHN)	24.52 Q	24.48
4	Brad Scott (AUS)	25.06 Q	25.09
5	Michael Churm (GBR)	25.30 Q	25.36
6	Rene Schramm (GER)	25.49 Q	25.37
7	Andrey Kholostyakov (RUS)	25.41 q	25.70
8	Mohamed Charmi (TUN)	25.30 q	53.24
9	Mohamed Allek (ALG)	25.51	
10	Matt Slade (NZL)	25.53	
11	Vladislav Barinov (RUS)	25.58	
12	Ali Qambar Ali Alansari (UAE)	25.64	
13	Jose Ribeiro Silva (BRA)	26.06	
14	Mustapha Moussaoui (ALG)	26.09	
15	Hossam Eldin Mohamed Sewillam (EGY)	26.25	
16	Mariano Dominguez (ARG)	26.41	
