= Athletics at the 2008 Summer Paralympics – Women's javelin throw F33–34/52–53 =

2008 sporting event

The 'Women's javelin throw F33–34/52–53 had its Final held on September 13 at 17:00.

== Medalists ==
Gold	Antonia Balek; Croatia
Silver	Louadjeda Benoumessad; Algeria
Bronze	Birgit Pohl; Germany

== Results ==
Place	Athlete	Class	1	2	3	4	5	6	Best	Points
1	Antonia Balek (CRO)	F52	12.82	12.19	12.79	-	-	-	12.82 WR	1425
2	Louadjeda Benoumessad (ALG)	F34	17.06	17.26	17.28	14.93	16.60	15.80	17.28 WR	1217
3	Birgit Pohl (GER)	F34	15.32	16.31	15.94	16.36	16.05	15.59	16.36	1152
4	Esther Rivera (MEX)	F53	11.32	11.54	11.69	11.38	11.56	11/28	11.69 PR	1027
5	Yousra Ben Jemaa (TUN)	F34	13.95	13.66	x	13.29	14.51	14.24	14.51	1022
6	Estela Salas (MEX)	F53	10.78	11.33	10.79	10.85	x	10.56	11.33	995
7	Frances Herrmann (GER)	F34	13.16	12.67	13.83	11.94	12.89	12.68	13.83	974
8	Thuraya Alzaabi (UAE)	F34	13.82	13.71	13.05	13.49	x	13.30	13.82	973
9	Leticis Ochoa (MEX)	F52	8.59	8.69	8.39				8.69	966
10	Jessica Hamill (NZL)	F34	12.78	13.37	13.68				13.68	963
11	A Triantafyllidou (GRE)	F34	13.14	13.39	x				13.39	943
12	Martina Kniezkova (CZE)	F52	7.86	7.94	7.72				7.94	883
13	Brydee Moore (AUS)	F33	11.60	x	11.46				11.60	856
14	Robyn Stawski (USA)	F33	11.48	11.50	10.81				11.50	849
15	Tiina Ala-Aho (FIN)	F33	11.51	10.81	x				11.51	849
16	Sonia Gouveia (BRA)	F53	8.57	8.57	8.41				8.57	753
