= Athletics at the 2004 Summer Paralympics – Men's club throw F32/51 =

Men's Club Throw F32/51 at the XII Paralympic Games
- Venue: Athens Olympic Stadium
- Dates: 21 September 2004
- Competitors: 9 from 7 nations
- Winning distance: 33.53

Medalists
1st place, gold medalist(s)		Stephen Miller	Great Britain
2nd place, silver medalist(s)		Radim Běleš	Czech Republic
3rd place, bronze medalist(s)		Karim Betina	Algeria

A Men's club throw event for wheelchair athletes in classes F32 and F51 was held at the 2004 Summer Paralympics in the Athens Olympic Stadium. It was won by Stephen Miller, representing Great Britain, who competes in class F32.

== Result ==
21 Sept. 2004, 09:30

Rank	Athlete	Result	Points	Notes
1st place, gold medalist(s)	Stephen Miller (GBR)	33.53	1133	WR
2nd place, silver medalist(s)	Radim Běleš (CZE)	25.44	993	
3rd place, bronze medalist(s)	Karim Betina (ALG)	29.17	986	
4	Ahmed Kamal (BRN)	27.65	934	
5	Ayman Al Heddi (BRN)	26.85	907	
6	Takefumi Anryo (JPN)	26.63	900	
7	Garrett Jameson (IRL)	26.32	890	
8	Park Se Ho (KOR)	25.67	868	
9	John McCarthy (IRL)	19.21	750	
