= Athletics at the 2008 Summer Paralympics – Men's 100 metres T37 =

The Men's 100m T37 had its competition held on September 12, with the first round at 9:25 and the Final at 17:45.

== Medalists ==
Gold	Fanie van der Merwe; South Africa
Silver	Yuxi Ma; China
Bronze	Sofiane Hamdi; Algeria

== Results ==
Place	Athlete	Round 1	Final
1	Fanie van der Merwe (RSA)	11.97 Q PR	11.83 PR
2	Yuxi Ma (CHN)	12.14 Q	11.90
3	Sofiane Hamdi (ALG)	12.15 Q	12.01
4	Matt Slade (NZL)	12.54 Q	12.46
5	Andrey Kholostyakov (RUS)	12.46 Q	12.49
6	Rene Schramm (GER)	12.43 Q	12.50
7	Darren Thrupp (AUS)	12.54 q	12.59
8	Michael Churm (GBR)	12.55 q	12.60
9	Sergii Kravchenko (UKR)	12.57	
9	Vladislav Barinov (RUS)	12.57	
11	Jose Ribeiro Silva (BRA)	12.58	
12	Mohamed Allek (ALG)	12.69	
13	Benjamin Cardozo (MEX)	12.73	
14	Ali Qambar Ali Alansari (UAE)	12.77	
15	Mariano Dominguez (ARG)	12.85	
16	Hossam Eldin Mohamed Sewillam (EGY)	12.94	
17	Mounga Okusitino (TGA)	14.81	
