= Karim El-Mahouab =

Algerian handball player (born 1966)

Personal information
- Nationality: Algerian
- Born: 18 October 1966

Sport
- Country: Algeria
- Sport: Handball

Karim El-Mahouab (born 18 October 1966) is an Algerian handball player. He competed at the 1996 Summer Olympics where he finished in tenth place. He was also the flag bearer for his nation during the opening ceremony.

Olympic Games
Preceded by Nacera Boukamoum	Flagbearer for Algeria; 1996 Atlanta	Succeeded by Djabir Saïd-Guerni
