= Athletics at the 2008 Summer Paralympics – Women's discus throw F57–58 =

Women's Discus F57/58 at the XIII Paralympic Games
- Venue: Beijing National Stadium
- Dates: 16 September
- Competitors: 14 from 12 nations
- Winning distance: 35.21

Medalists
1st place, gold medalist(s)		Eucharia Njideka Iyiazi	Nigeria
2nd place, silver medalist(s)		Stela Eneva	Bulgaria
3rd place, bronze medalist(s)		Nadia Medjemedj	Algeria

The women's discus F57/58 event at the 2008 Summer Paralympics took place at the Beijing National Stadium at 17:00 on 16 September. There was a single round of competition; after the first three throws, only the top eight had 3 further throws. The competition was won by Eucharia Njideka Iyiazi, representing Nigeria.

== Results ==
Rank	Athlete	Nationality	Cl.	1	2	3	4	5	6	Best	Pts.	Notes
1st place, gold medalist(s)	Eucharia Njideka Iyiazi	Nigeria	F58	31.83	31.25	28.96	31.91	35.21	33.31	35.21	1120	PR
2nd place, silver medalist(s)	Stela Eneva	Bulgaria	F58	33.83	34.41	34.58	33.33	31.69	33.32	34.58	1100	SB
3rd place, bronze medalist(s)	Nadia Medjemedj	Algeria	F57	27.01	26.28	25.93	27.18	28.74	27.78	28.74	1090	PR
4	Nassima Saifi	Algeria	F58	x	34.09	33.39	31.61	32.21	33.63	34.09	1084	
5	Orla Barry	Ireland	F57	27.08	24.80	25.28	x	x	x	27.08	1027	
6	Mariem Soudani	Tunisia	F58	27.82	29.89	30.47	30.49	29.99	30.78	30.78	979	
7	Roseane Santos	Brazil	F58	x	28.58	26.38	28.09	30.51	29.82	30.51	970	
8	Fatemeh Montazeri Ghahjaverestani	Iran	F58	x	26.94	28.20	23.73	25.02	27.11	28.20	897	
9	Thi Hai Nguyen	Vietnam	F58	27.27	27.35	28.04	-	-	-	28.04	892	
10	Ivanka Koleva	Bulgaria	F57	x	23.38	x	-	-	-	23.38	887	SB
11	Catalina Rosales	Mexico	F58	26.11	26.12	25.78	-	-	-	26.12	831	
12	Sylvia Grant	Jamaica	F57	19.69	16.91	17.60	-	-	-	19.69	747	
13	Tharwh Al Hajaj	Jordan	F58	22.89	23.05	22.50	-	-	-	23.05	733	
14	Kuong Sio Ieng	Macau	F57	15.28	12.88	14.86	-	-	-	15.28	579	

PR = Paralympic Record. SB = Seasonal Best.
