= Louadjeda Benoumessad =

Algerian Paralympic athlete

Medal record

Women's para athletics

Representing Algeria

Paralympic Games
Silver medal – second place	2008 Beijing	Javelin Throw - F33-34/52-53

Louadjeda Benoumessad (born 1 January 1982) is a Paralympian athlete from Algeria competing mainly in category F34 javelin throw events.

She competed in the 2008 Summer Paralympics in Beijing, China. There she won a silver medal in the women's F33-34/52-53 javelin throw event. She also competed in the discus and shot put but failed to medal in either.
