= Mounir Bakiri =

Algerian Paralympic athlete

Medal record

Paralympic athletics

Representing Algeria

Paralympic Games
Bronze medal – third place	2008 Beijing 2012 Summer Paralympics	Shot Put – F32

Mounir Bakiri is a Paralympian athlete from Algeria competing mainly in category F32 shot put events.

He competed in the 2008 Summer Paralympics in Beijing, China and 2012 Summer Paralympics in London, United Kingdom. In both Paralympics he won bronze medals in the men's F32 shot put event.
