= Mourad Guerri =

Algerian alpine skier (born 1975)

Personal information
- Nationality: Algerian
- Born: 8 January 1975 (age 50)

Sport
- Sport: Alpine skiing

Mourad Guerri (born 8 January 1975) is an Algerian alpine skier. He competed in three events at the 1992 Winter Olympics.
