= Karim Betina =

Algerian Paralympic athlete

Medal record

Paralympic athletics

Representing Algeria

Paralympic Games
Gold medal – first place	2004 Athens	Shot Put – F32
Gold medal – first place	2008 Beijing	Shot Put – F32
Silver medal – second place	2012 London	Shot Put – F32/33
Bronze medal – third place	2004 Athens	Club Throw – F32/51

IPC World Championships
Silver medal – second place	2013 Lyon	Shot put – F32/33
Silver medal – second place	2015 Doha	Shot put – F32

Karim Betina is a Paralympian athlete from Algeria competing mainly in category F32 shot put and club throw events.

Karim is a two time Paralympic champion in the F32 shot put, winning the gold medal in both Athens, Greece in 2004 and in Beijing, China in 2008. He also won the bronze medal in the club throw in the F32/51 class in 2004.
