= Sherry Lawrence =

Canadian alpine skier (born 1984)

Personal information
- Born: January 17, 1984 (age 42) Calgary, Alberta, Canada
- Height: 171 cm (5 ft 7 in)

Skiing career
- Sport: Alpine skiing
- Disciplines: Downhill, Super G
- World Cup debut: December 3, 2004

Olympics
- Teams: 1

World Cup
- Seasons: 4

Sherry Lawrence (born January 17, 1984) is a Canadian alpine skier who represented Canada at the 2006 Winter Olympics in Turin, Italy.

Lawrence was born and lives in Calgary, Alberta where she attended high school at the National Sport School. She learned to ski at the Nakiska which hosted the 1988 Winter Olympics. She trained as a member of the Kananaskis Alpine Ski Club.

Lawrence made her World Cup debut at Lake Louise in the 39th World Cup season at the age of 20. She placed 53rd in the Downhill event with a time of 1:27.44. Lawrence competed at the 2006 Winter Olympics in Downhill and Super Giant Slalom placing 27th and 33rd respectively.
