= Mehdi-Selim Khelifi =

Algerian cross-country skier (born 1992)

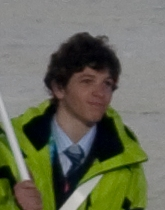
Mehdi-Sélim Khelifi in 2010.

Mehdi-Sélim Khelifi (born 1 September 1992) is an Algerian cross-country skier who has competed since 2009. He finished 84th in the 15 km event at the 2010 Winter Olympics in Vancouver, British Columbia, Canada. He was the flag bearer for the opening ceremony.

Khelifi's best career finish was 26th in an individual sprint event at Germany in January 2010.

Olympic Games
Preceded by Salim Iles	Flagbearer for Algeria; Vancouver 2010	Succeeded by Abdelhafid Benchabla
