= Mohamed Lazhari =

Algerian and French gymnast (born 1938)

- محمد لزهاري
- Alternative name: Mohamed Yamani
- Born: 12 April 1938 (age 88) Algiers, French Algeria
- Height: 175 cm (5 ft 9 in)
- Relatives: Larbi Lazhari (brother)

Gymnastics career
- Discipline: Men's artistic gymnastics
- Country represented: Algeria
- Former countries represented: France
Medal record
Men's artistic gymnastics
Representing Puteaux
French Championships
Gold medal – first place	1962	All-around

Mohamed Lazhari (Arabic: محمد لزهاري, romanized: Muḥammad lzhāry; born 12 April 1938), later known as Mohamed Yamani, is an Algerian and French former gymnast. Born in Algiers, Lazhari was part of the French team at the 1960 Summer Olympics. He had represented Puteaux in the 1962 French Championships and won gold in the all-around. He left the club upon Algeria gaining its independence, training in Paris instead.

He then represented Algeria at the 1964 Summer Olympics, becoming the first Algerian Olympian. He was also designated as the nation's flagbearer at the games. In his later years, he was the president of the African Gymnastics Union and was awarded the Order of the Rising Sun.

== Early life ==
Mohamed Lazhari was born on 12 April 1938 in Algiers, French Algeria, in a kasbah. He was born to a family of twelve children, including his brother and fellow gymnast Larbi Lazhari, who had competed for Algeria at the 1968 Summer Olympics. He started gymnastics at the age of twelve upon the request of his father to develop his body and pass time.

== Gymnastics career ==
Lazhari was part of the French team at the 1960 Summer Olympics in Rome, Italy. He competed in every event, placing as high as 13th as part of the men's team event and 28th individually at the men's horizontal bar. While competing for Puteaux, he had won the all-around event at the 1962 French Artistic Gymnastic Championships organized by the French Gymnastics Federation. Though in the same year, he had to decide whether to stay at the club or leave the club and represent Algeria as the nation gained independence, he chose the latter.

Though he left the club, Lazhari-Yemeni was able to train in Paris before the 1964 Summer Olympics in Tokyo, Japan. He was the first Olympian to represent Algeria. At the games, competitors went up to Lazhari-Yemeni and asked facts about Algeria including its location and language. He resided alone at the Olympic Village and trained alone. He was selected to be the first flag bearer for Algeria at the Parade of Nations during the games' opening ceremony. He competed in every event besides the team event, placing 99th in the men's all-around and as high as 60th for the individual apparatuses, doing so in the men's rings.

== Post-gymnastics career ==
Lazhari-Yemeni was the president of the African Gymnastics Union on multiple occasions. In 2017, he was in attendance of an athletes' forum held by the Algerian Olympic Committee that honoured Olympic gold medalist Noureddine Morceli. The following year, he was contacted by the Japanese Embassy in Algeria and was awarded the Order of the Rising Sun, 5th Class, Gold and Silver Rays, on 4 February.

== See also ==
- France at the 1960 Summer Olympics
- Algeria at the 1964 Summer Olympics

Olympic Games
Preceded by Position established	Flagbearer for Algeria; 1964 Tokyo	Succeeded by Azzedine Azzouzi
