= Hocine Gherzouli =

Algerian Paralympic athlete

Medal record

Paralympic athletics

Representing Algeria

Paralympic Games
| Silver medal – second place | 2012 London | Shot Put - F40 |
| Bronze medal – third place | 2008 Beijing | Shot Put - F40 |

Hocine Gherzouli, (Arabic:حسين غيرذل) is a Paralympian athlete from Algeria competing mainly in category F40 shot put events.

He competed in the 2008 Summer Paralympics in Beijing, China. There he won a bronze medal in the men's F40 shot put event.
