= Kamel Guerri =

Algerian alpine skier (born 1968)

Personal information
- Nationality: Algerian
- Born: 6 June 1968 (age 56)

Sport
- Sport: Alpine skiing

Kamel Guerri (born 6 June 1968) is an Algerian alpine skier. He competed in two events at the 1992 Winter Olympics.
