= Sofiane Hamdi =

Algerian Paralympic athlete (born 1989)

Personal information
- Born: 22 August 1989 (age 36)

Sport
- Sport: Track and field
- Disability class: T37
Medal record
Men's para-athletics
Representing Algeria
Paralympic Games
Silver medal – second place	2008 Beijing	200 m T37
Bronze medal – third place	2008 Beijing	100 m T37
Bronze medal – third place	2016 Rio	400 m T37
World Championships
Gold medal – first place	2011 Christchurch	200 m T37
Silver medal – second place	2011 Christchurch	400 m T37
Bronze medal – third place	2011 Christchurch	100 m T37
Silver medal – second place	2013 Lyon	400 m T37
Bronze medal – third place	2013 Lyon	200 m T37
Silver medal – second place	2017 London	400 m T37
Bronze medal – third place	2017 London	200 m T37
Islamic Solidarity Games
Silver medal – second place	2025 Riyadh	100 m T37
All-Africa Games
Gold medal – first place	2011 Maputo	100 m T37
Gold medal – first place	2011 Maputo	400 m T37
Silver medal – second place	2011 Maputo	200 m T37
Silver medal – second place	2015 Brazzaville	100 m T37

Sofiane Hamdi (born 22 August 1989) is a Paralympic athlete from Algeria competing mainly in category T37 sprint events.

== Career ==
He competed in the 2008 Summer Paralympics in Beijing, China. There he won a silver medal in the men's 200 metres – T37 event and a bronze medal in the men's 100 metres – T37 event
