= Larbi Lazhari =

Algerian gymnast

- Born: 3 July 1941 (age 85) Algiers, Algeria

Gymnastics career
- Discipline: Men's artistic gymnastics
- Country represented: Algeria

Larbi Lazhari (born 3 July 1941 in Algiers) represented Algeria in the gymnastic events at the 1968 Summer Olympic Games.

== See also ==
- Algeria at the 1968 Summer Olympics
