= Christelle Laura Douibi =

Algerian alpine skier (born 1985)

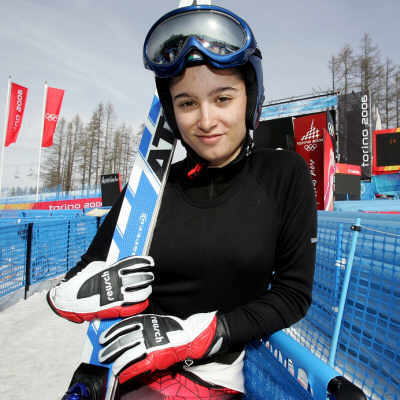
Christelle Laura Douibi at the 2006 Winter Olympics

Christelle Laura Douibi (born 24 November 1985 in Grenoble) is an Algerian alpine skier at the 2006 Winter Olympics. She dedicated her first race to her deceased father Mohammed. She was also the nation's flag bearer, and the only woman to represent Africa at the 2006 Winter Olympics.

Olympic Games
Preceded by Djabir Saïd-Guerni	Flagbearer for Algeria; 2006 Torino	Succeeded by Salim Iles
