= Zine Eddine Sekhri =

Algerian paralympic athlete

Zine Eddine Sekhri
Medal record

Paralympic athletics

Representing Algeria

Paralympic Games
Bronze medal – third place	2008 Beijing	800m – T13

Zine Eddine Sekhri is a Paralympian athlete from Algeria competing mainly in the category of T13 middle-distance events.

He competed in the 2008 Summer Paralympics in Beijing, China. There, he won a bronze medal in the men's 800 metres – T13 event and finished sixth in the men's 400 metres – T13 event.
