= List of flag bearers for the Central African Republic at the Olympics =

Central African Republic at the Olympics
- Flag of the Central African Republic
- IOC code: CAF
- NOC: Comité National Olympique et Sportif Centrafricain
- Medals: Gold 0 Silver 0 Bronze 0 Total 0

Summer appearances
- 1968; 1972–1980; 1984; 1988; 1992; 1996; 2000; 2004; 2008; 2012; 2016; 2020; 2024

This is a list of flag bearers who have represented Central African Republic at the Olympics.

Flag bearers carry the national flag of their country at the opening ceremony of the Olympic Games.

#	Event year	Season	Flag bearer	Sport
1	1968	Summer		
2	1984	Summer	André Marie Sayet	Boxing
3	1988	Summer	Fidèle Mohinga	Boxing
4	1992	Summer		
5	1996	Summer	Mickaël Conjungo	Athletics
6	2000	Summer	Zacharia Maidjida	Athletics
7	2004	Summer	Ernest Ndissipou	Athletics
8	2008	Summer	Mireille Derebona	Athletics
9	2012	Summer	David Boui	Taekwondo
10	2016	Summer	Chloe Sauvourel	Swimming
11	2020	Summer	Francky Mbotto	Athletics
11	2020	Summer	Chloe Sauvourel	Swimming
12	2024	Summer	Nadia Guimendego	Judo
12	2024	Summer	Terence Tengue	Swimming

== See also ==
- Central African Republic at the Olympics
