= Central African Republic at the 2025 World Aquatics Championships =

- Flag of Central African Republic
- World Aquatics code: CAF
- National federation: Fédération Centrafricaine de Natation

in Singapore
- Competitors: 1 in 1 sport
- Medals: Gold 0 Silver 0 Bronze 0 Total 0

World Aquatics Championships appearances
- 2009; 2011; 2013; 2015; 2017; 2019; 2022; 2023; 2024; 2025

Central African Republic competed at the 2025 World Aquatics Championships in Singapore from 11 July to 3 August 2025.

== Competitors ==
The following is the list of competitors in the Championships.

Sport	Men	Women	Total
Swimming	1	0	1
Total	1	0	1

== Swimming ==
Men

Athlete	Event	Heat		Semifinal		Final	
Athlete	Event	Time	Rank	Time	Rank	Time	Rank
Leo Nzimbi	50 m freestyle	26.23	97	Did not advance			
Leo Nzimbi	50 m breaststroke	33.79	76	Did not advance			
