= Central African Republic at the 2016 Summer Olympics =

- Flag of the Central African Republic
- IOC code: CAF
- NOC: Comité National Olympique et Sportif Centrafricain

in Rio de Janeiro
- Competitors: 6 in 4 sports
- Flag bearer: Chloe Sauvourel
- Medals: Gold 0 Silver 0 Bronze 0 Total 0

Summer Olympics appearances (overview)
- 1968; 1972–1980; 1984; 1988; 1992; 1996; 2000; 2004; 2008; 2012; 2016; 2020; 2024

The Central African Republic competed at the 2016 Summer Olympics in Rio de Janeiro, Brazil, from 5 to 21 August 2016. This was the nation's tenth appearance at the Summer Olympics since its debut in 1968. Central African Republic failed to register any athletes at the 1972 Summer Olympics in Munich, and was part of the African and United States-led boycotts in 1976 and 1980, respectively.

Six athletes, three per gender, were selected to the Central African Republic team across four different sports (athletics, boxing, swimming, and taekwondo) for the Games, matching their roster size at London 2012. Half of the nation's roster made their Olympic debut in Rio de Janeiro, with middle-distance runner Elisabeth Mandaba, swimmer Christian Nassif, and taekwondo fighter David Boui returning for their second appearance. Meanwhile, Chloe Sauvourel, the youngest athlete on the team (aged 17), served as the nation's flag bearer in the opening ceremony.

Central African Republic, however, has yet to win its first Olympic medal.

== Athletics ==
Central African Republic received universality slots from IAAF to send two athletes (one male and one female) to the Olympics.

Key

- Note – Ranks given for track events are within the athlete's heat only
- Q = Qualified for the next round
- q = Qualified for the next round as a fastest loser or, in field events, by position without achieving the qualifying target
- NR = National record
- N/A = Round not applicable for the event
- Bye = Athlete not required to compete in round

Track & road events

Athlete	Event	Heat		Semifinal		Final	
Athlete	Event	Result	Rank	Result	Rank	Result	Rank
Francky-Edgard Mbotto	Men's 800 m	1:52.97	7	Did not advance			
Elisabeth Mandaba	Women's 800 m	2:11.70 NR	8	Did not advance			

== Boxing ==
Central African Republic received an invitation from the Tripartite Commission to send a female boxer competing in the flyweight division to the Games, signifying the nation's return to the sport after an eight-year hiatus.

Athlete	Event	Round of 16	Quarterfinals	Semifinals	Final	
Athlete	Event	Opposition Result	Opposition Result	Opposition Result	Opposition Result	Rank
Judith Mbougnade	Women's flyweight	Valencia (COL); L TKO	Did not advance			

== Swimming ==
Central African Republic received a Universality invitation from FINA to send two swimmers (one male and one female) to the Olympics.

Athlete	Event	Heat		Semifinal		Final	
Athlete	Event	Time	Rank	Time	Rank	Time	Rank
Christian Nassif	Men's 50 m freestyle	30.00	84	Did not advance			
Chloe Sauvourel	Women's 50 m freestyle	37.15	85	Did not advance			

== Taekwondo ==
The Central African Republic received an invitation from the Tripartite Commission to send London 2012 Olympian David Boui in the men's lightweight category (68 kg) into the Olympic taekwondo competition.

Athlete	Event	Round of 16	Quarterfinals	Semifinals	Repechage	Final / BM	
Athlete	Event	Opposition Result	Opposition Result	Opposition Result	Opposition Result	Opposition Result	Rank
David Boui	Men's −68 kg	Lee D-h (KOR); L 0–6	Did not advance				
