= Central African Republic at the 1996 Summer Olympics =

- Flag of the Central African Republic
- IOC code: CAF
- NOC: Comité National Olympique et Sportif Centrafricain

in Atlanta
- Competitors: 5 in 1 sport
- Flag bearer: Mickael Conjungo
- Medals: Gold 0 Silver 0 Bronze 0 Total 0

Summer Olympics appearances (overview)
- 1968; 1972–1980; 1984; 1988; 1992; 1996; 2000; 2004; 2008; 2012; 2016; 2020; 2024

The Central African Republic competed at the 1996 Summer Olympics in Atlanta, United States.

== Competitors ==
The following is the list of number of competitors in the Games.

Sport	Men	Women	Total
Athletics	3	2	5
Total	3	2	5

== Results by event ==
=== Athletics ===
==== Men ====
Track and road events

Athletes	Events	Heat Round 1		Heat Round 2		Semifinal		Final	
Athletes	Events	Time	Rank	Time	Rank	Time	Rank	Time	Rank
Martial Biguet	400 metres	48.92	53	did not advance					
Ernest Ndissipou	Marathon	N/A						2:35:55	97

Field events

Athlete	Event	Qualification		Final	
Athlete	Event	Result	Rank	Result	Rank
Mickaël Conjungo	Discus throw	55.34	34	did not advance	

==== Women ====
Track and road events

Athletes	Events	Heat Round 1		Heat Round 2		Semifinal		Final	
Athletes	Events	Time	Rank	Time	Rank	Time	Rank	Time	Rank
Denise Ouabangui	400 metres	55.74	46	did not advance					
Virginie Gloum	Marathon	N/A						did not finish	
