= Central African Republic at the 2012 Summer Olympics =

- Flag of the Central African Republic
- IOC code: CAF
- NOC: Comité National Olympique et Sportif Centrafricain

in London
- Competitors: 6 in 4 sports
- Flag bearer: David Boui
- Medals: Gold 0 Silver 0 Bronze 0 Total 0

Summer Olympics appearances (overview)
- 1968; 1972–1980; 1984; 1988; 1992; 1996; 2000; 2004; 2008; 2012; 2016; 2020; 2024

Central African Republic competed at the 2012 Summer Olympics in London, United Kingdom from 27 July to 12 August 2012. This was the nation's ninth appearance at the Olympics, excluding three games after its national debut in 1968.

Comité National Olympique et Sportif Centrafricain sent the nation's largest delegation in its Olympic history, after the 1992 Summer Olympics in Barcelona. 6 athletes, an equal share between men and women, were selected to the team, competing only in athletics, taekwondo, swimming, and wrestling (the last two sports marked its Olympic debut in London). Sprinter Berenger Aymard Bosse, who advanced past the first round for the first time in the men's event, became the only athlete to compete at his second Olympics. Taekwondo jin David Boui, on the other hand, was appointed by the committee to be the nation's flag bearer at the opening ceremony. Central African Republic, however, has yet to win its first Olympic medal.

== Athletics ==
Key

- Note–Ranks given for track events are within the athlete's heat only
- Q = Qualified for the next round
- q = Qualified for the next round as a fastest loser or, in field events, by position without achieving the qualifying target
- NR = National record
- N/A = Round not applicable for the event
- Bye = Athlete not required to compete in round

Men

Athlete	Event	Heat		Quarterfinal		Semifinal		Final	
Athlete	Event	Result	Rank	Result	Rank	Result	Rank	Result	Rank
Berenger Aymard Bosse	100 m	10.55	1 Q	10.55	7	Did not advance			

Women

Athlete	Event	Heat		Semifinal		Final	
Athlete	Event	Result	Rank	Result	Rank	Result	Rank
Elisabeth Mandaba	800 m	2:12.56	7	Did not advance			

== Swimming ==
Men

Athlete	Event	Heat		Semifinal		Final	
Athlete	Event	Time	Rank	Time	Rank	Time	Rank
Christian Nassif	50 m freestyle	28.04	55	Did not advance			

== Taekwondo ==
Central African Republic has qualified 2 athletes.

Athlete	Event	Round of 16	Quarterfinals	Semifinals	Repechage	Bronze Medal	Final	
Athlete	Event	Opposition Result	Opposition Result	Opposition Result	Opposition Result	Opposition Result	Opposition Result	Rank
David Boui	Men's −68 kg	Motamed (IRI); L 2–7	Did not advance		Nikpai (AFG); L 2–14 PTG	Did not advance		
Seulki Kang	Women's −49 kg	Zaninović (CRO); L 0–14 PTG	Did not advance					

== Wrestling ==
Central African Republic has received one wild card in wrestling.

Key:

- VT - Victory by Fall.
- PP - Decision by Points - the loser with technical points.
- PO - Decision by Points - the loser without technical points.

Women's freestyle

Athlete	Event	Qualification	Round of 16	Quarterfinal	Semifinal	Repechage 1	Repechage 2	Final / BM	
Athlete	Event	Opposition Result	Opposition Result	Opposition Result	Opposition Result	Opposition Result	Opposition Result	Opposition Result	Rank
Sylvie Datty	−63 kg	Bye	Battsetseg (MGL); L 0–3 ^{PO}	Did not advance					20
