= Central African Republic at the 2000 Summer Olympics =

- Flag of the Central African Republic
- IOC code: CAF
- NOC: Comité National Olympique et Sportif Centrafricain

in Sydney
- Competitors: 3
- Flag bearer: Zacharia Maidjida
- Medals: Gold 0 Silver 0 Bronze 0 Total 0

Summer Olympics appearances (overview)
- 1968; 1972–1980; 1984; 1988; 1992; 1996; 2000; 2004; 2008; 2012; 2016; 2020; 2024

The Central African Republic competed at the 2000 Summer Olympics in Sydney, Australia. This marked sixth appearance of the nation at a Summer Olympics. The country entered three competitors; Henriette Youanga in the women's individual archery, Mickaël Conjungo in the men's discus throw and Maria-Joëlle Conjungo in the women's 100 metres hurdles. None of those athletes advanced out of their heats.

== Background ==
The Central African Republic made its debut in the Olympic Games at the 1968 Summer Olympics in Mexico City, Mexico. The country has twice boycotted the Olympic Games, first was because of the inclusion of the New Zealand team at the 1976 Summer Olympics despite the breach of the international sports boycott of South Africa by the nation's rugby union team shortly prior. Then in 1980, the country was one of several who joined in with a United States led boycott over the 1979 invasion of Afghanistan during the Soviet–Afghan War. The highest number of Central African athletes entered in a team for an Olympics is 15, occurring at both the 1988 and 1992 Summer Olympics.

== Competitors ==
The following is the list of number of competitors in the Games.

Sport	Men	Women	Total
Archery	0	1	1
Athletics	1	1	2
Total	1	2	3

== Archery ==
The sole archer for the Central African Republic competing in the 2000 Summer Olympics was Henriette Youanga, in the women's individual. She took part in the two ranking rounds on 16 September at the Sydney International Archery Park. She scored 238 and 252 in the ranking rounds; placing 63rd out of the 64 competitors in each round, as well as overall. These rounds were used to allocate archers against each other in the single elimination tournament. Based on the result, Youanga was drawn against Natalia Valeeva of Italy, who had finished second overall in the ranking rounds. The match between the two took place the following day, with Valeeva winning by 166 points to Youanga's 126.

Archery

Name	Event	Ranking round		Round of 64	Round of 32	Round of 16	Quarterfinals	Semifinals	Final
Name	Event	Round one	Round two	Opposition Result	Opposition Result	Opposition Result	Opposition Result	Opposition Result	Opposition Result
Henriette Youanga	Women's individual	238	252	Valeeva (ITA); L 126–166	did not advance				

== Athletics ==
The Central African Republic was represented by two athletes in athletics; Mickaël Conjungo in the men's discus throw and Maria-Joëlle Conjungo in the women's 100 metres hurdles. Mickaël Conjungo, competing in his third Olympic Games, threw a foul in his first throw in the discus, but recorded a distance of 57.85 metres (189.8 ft) with his second throw. His third throw was shorter, at 55.60 metres (182.4 ft), so his second throw was counted as the longest for the round. This mean he finished in sixteenth place, ending his appearances at the Games since only the first 12 competitors qualified for the following round.

Maria-Joëlle Conjungo took part in the 100 metres on 25 September in the second heat. She finished in seventh place with a time of 13.95 seconds; the top six qualified for the following round, four automatically and then those in fifth and sixth place due to finishing among the four fastest runners up overall.

Field events

Athlete	Event	Qualification		Final	
Athlete	Event	Distance	Position	Distance	Position
Mickaël Conjungo	Men's discus throw	57.85	18	did not advance	

Track events

Athlete	Event	Heat		Quarterfinal		Semifinal		Final	
Athlete	Event	Result	Rank	Result	Rank	Result	Rank	Result	Rank
Maria-Joëlle Conjungo	Women's 100 m hurdles	13.95	7	did not advance					
