= Central African Republic at the 1988 Summer Olympics =

- Flag of the Central African Republic
- IOC code: CAF
- NOC: Comité National Olympique et Sportif Centrafricain

in Seoul
- Competitors: 15 in 3 sports
- Flag bearer: Fidèle Mohinga
- Medals: Gold 0 Silver 0 Bronze 0 Total 0

Summer Olympics appearances (overview)
- 1968; 1972–1980; 1984; 1988; 1992; 1996; 2000; 2004; 2008; 2012; 2016; 2020; 2024

The Central African Republic competed at the 1988 Summer Olympics in Seoul, South Korea. This marked the third appearance of the nation at a Summer Olympics. The country entered 15 competitors, the highest number of Central Africans appearing at any Games so far; with the basketball team comprising 12 of them. In addition to the boxers Fidèle Mohinga and Moussa Wiawindi, there was marathon runner Adolphe Ambowodé, who had previously competed at the 1984 Summer Olympics. No medals were won by any of those athletes.

== Background ==
The Central African Republic made its debut in the Olympic Games at the 1968 Summer Olympics in Mexico City, Mexico. The country has twice boycotted the Olympic Games, first was because of the inclusion of the New Zealand team at the 1976 Summer Olympics despite the breach of the international sports boycott of South Africa by the nation's rugby union team shortly prior. Then in 1980, the country was one of several who joined in with a United States led boycott over the 1979 invasion of Afghanistan during the Soviet–Afghan War. The highest number of Central African athletes entered in a team for an Olympics is 15, occurring at both the 1988 and 1992 Summer Olympics.

== Competitors ==
The following is the list of number of competitors in the Games.

Sport	Men	Women	Total
Athletics	1	0	1
Basketball	12	0	12
Boxing	2	–	2
Total	15	0	15

== Athletics ==
At his previous appearance the 1984 Summer Olympics, runner Adolphe Ambowodé completed the Men's marathon in a time of 2:41:26, finishing in 70th place. His time in the marathon at the 1988 Games was nearly 18 minutes faster, with the runner finishing in a time of 2:23:52 in 42nd place out of the 98 athletes completing the course. The result was the best performance by a Central African at an athletics so far.

Marathon

Event	Athlete	Race	
Event	Athlete	Time	Rank
Men's marathon	Adolphe Ambowodé	2:23:52	42

== Basketball ==
The Central African team qualified for the Olympics following their victory at the FIBA Africa Championship 1987 in December that year. They were one of two African teams, alongside the basketball squad from Egypt.

Summary

Key:

- FT – After full time.
- P – Match decided by penalty-shootout.

Team	Event	Group stage						Quarterfinal	Semifinal / 9th–12th	Final / 9th–12th	
Team	Event	Opposition Score	Opposition Score	Opposition Score	Opposition Score	Opposition Score	Rank	Opposition Score	Opposition Score	Opposition Score	Rank
Central African Republic men's	Men's tournament	South Korea; W 73–70	Yugoslavia; L 61–102	Australia; L 67–106	Puerto Rico; L 67–71	Soviet Union; L 78–87	5	—N/a	Egypt; W 63–57	South Korea; L 81–89	10

Team roster

The following is the Central African Republic roster in the men's basketball tournament of the 1988 Summer Olympics.

Central African Republic men's national basketball team – 1988 Summer Olympics roster
Players
Coaches

Pos.	No.	Name	Age – Date of birth	Height	Club	Ctr.
	4	Sanda Bouba Oumarou	30 – 1 January 1958	1.87 m (6 ft 2 in)
	5	Aubin-Thierry Goporo	20 – 15 May 1968	1.85 m (6 ft 1 in)
	6	Joseph-Dieudonné Ouagon	25 – 10 November 1962	1.87 m (6 ft 2 in)
F	7	Bruno-Nazaire Kongaouin	21 – 12 October 1966	2.03 m (6 ft 8 in)
	8	Eugène Pehoua-Pelema	25 – 8 April 1963	1.92 m (6 ft 4 in)
	9	Guy M'Bongo	19 – 23 September 1968	1.96 m (6 ft 5 in)
	10	Frédéricque Rufin Goporo	22 – 8 August 1966	1.75 m (5 ft 9 in)
	11	Jean-Pierre Kotta	32 – 3 May 1956	1.87 m (6 ft 2 in)
	12	Christian Gombe	26 – 22 February 1962	1.90 m (6 ft 3 in)
C	13	Anicet Lavodrama	25 – 4 July 1963	2.02 m (6 ft 8 in)
	14	Richard Bella	21 – 3 April 1967	2.05 m (6 ft 9 in)
	15	François Naoueyama	31 – 31 January 1957	2.02 m (6 ft 8 in)

Legend

- Club – describes last
  club before the tournament
- Age – describes age
  on 17 September 1988

Group play

Pos	Team	Pld	W	L	PF	PA	PD	Pts	Qualification
1	Yugoslavia	5	4	1	468	384	+84	9 (Note: Head-to-head record: Yugoslavia 1–0 Soviet Union)	Quarterfinals
2	Soviet Union	5	4	1	460	393	+67	9	Quarterfinals
3	Australia	5	3	2	429	408	+21	8 (Note: Head-to-head record: Australia 1–0 Puerto Rico)	Quarterfinals
4	Puerto Rico	5	3	2	382	387	−5	8	Quarterfinals
5	Central African Republic	5	1	4	346	436	−90	6	9th–12th classification round
6	South Korea (H)	5	0	5	384	461	−77	5	9th–12th classification round

Source: FIBA archive
Rules for classification: 1) points; 2) head-to-head points; 3) head-to-head goal average; 4) head-to-head number of points scored.
(H) Hosts
Notes:

18 September 1988

Central African Republic	73–70	South Korea
Scoring by half: 47–30, 26–40

Jamsil Gymnasium, Seoul

20 September 1988

Central African Republic	61–102	Yugoslavia
Scoring by half: 21–51, 40–51

Jamsil Gymnasium, Seoul

21 September 1988

Australia	106–67	Central African Republic
Scoring by half: 57–35, 49–32

Jamsil Gymnasium, Seoul

23 September 1988

Central African Republic	67–71	Puerto Rico
Scoring by half: 41–27, 26–34

Jamsil Gymnasium, Seoul

24 September 1988

Central African Republic	78–87	Soviet Union
Scoring by half: 31–40, 47–47

Jamsil Gymnasium, Seoul

Classification round (9th–12th place)

26 September 1988
09:45

Boxscore

Central African Republic	63–57	Egypt
Scoring by half: 33–31, 30–26
Pts: F. Goporo, Bella 15; Rebs: Lavodrama 16; Asts: Lavodrama 7		Pts: Khalil 17; Rebs: Khalil 8 Asts: Amir 4

Jamsil Gymnasium, Seoul

Classification round (9th/10th place)

29 September 1988
16:30

Boxscore

Central African Republic	81–89	South Korea
Scoring by half: 41–43, 40–46
Pts: Lavodrama 14; Rebs: Lavodrama 12; Asts: Kotta 3		Pts: Lee CH 31; Rebs: Lee MK 8 Asts: Kim HJ 6

Jamsil Gymnasium, Seoul

== Boxing ==
The Central African Republic entered two boxers in the tournaments at the 1988 Summer Olympics, Fidèle Mohinga and Moussa Wiawindi. Mohinga competed in the welterweight class, defeating Adão N'Zuzi of Angola in the first round on 20 September. But, he was defeated by Maselino Masoe of American Samoa in the following round, four days later. Wiawindi was defeated in the first round of the light-middleweight tournament by Cameroon's François Mayo.

Boxing

Name	Event	Round of 32	Round of 16	Quarterfinals	Semifinals	Final
Name	Event	Opposition Result	Opposition Result	Opposition Result	Opposition Result	Opposition Result
Fidèle Mohinga	Welterweight	N'Zuzi (ANG); W Points	Masoe (ASA); L Points	did not advance		
Moussa Wiawindi	Light-Middleweight	Mayo (CMR); L Points	did not advance			

== Sources ==
- Grasso, John; Mallon, Bill; Heijmans, Jeroen (2015). Historical Dictionary of the Olympic Movement (5th ed.). Lanham: Rowman & Littlefield. ISBN 978-1-4422-4859-5.
