= Central African Republic at the 1992 Summer Olympics =

- Flag of the Central African Republic
- IOC code: CAF
- NOC: Comité National Olympique et Sportif Centrafricain

in Barcelona
- Competitors: 15 (13 men and 2 women)
- Medals: Gold 0 Silver 0 Bronze 0 Total 0

Summer Olympics appearances (overview)
- 1968; 1972–1980; 1984; 1988; 1992; 1996; 2000; 2004; 2008; 2012; 2016; 2020; 2024

The Central African Republic competed at the 1992 Summer Olympics in Barcelona, Spain. Fifteen competitors, thirteen men and two women, took part in sixteen events in three sports.

== Competitors ==
The following is the list of number of competitors in the Games.

| Sport | Men | Women | Total |
|---|---|---|---|
| Athletics | 7 | 1 | 8 |
| Cycling | 4 | 0 | 4 |
| Judo | 2 | 1 | 3 |
| Total | 13 | 2 | 15 |

== Athletics ==
Men
Track and road events

| Athlete | Event | Heats | | Quarterfinal | | Semifinal | | Final | |
| Athlete | Event | Result | Rank | Result | Rank | Result | Rank | Result | Rank |
|---|---|---|---|---|---|---|---|---|---|
| Valentin Ngbogo | 100 metres | 10.79 | 47 | Did not advance | | | | | |
| Valentin Ngbogo | 200 metres | 21.51 | 43 | Did not advance | | | | | |
| Martial Biguet | 400 metres | 47.82 (NR) | 52 | Did not advance | | | | | |
| Zacharia Maidjida | 800 metres | 1:50.41 | 35 | — | | Did not advance | | | |
| Zacharia Maidjida | 1500 metres | 3:55.72 | 41 | — | | Did not advance | | | |
| Ernest Ndissipou | 5000 metres | 14:40.12 | 47 | — | | | | Did not advance | |
| Ferdinand Amadi | Marathon | — | | | | | | 2:35:39 | 74 |
| Jacques-Henri Brunet | 400 metres hurdles | 52.59 | 36 | — | | Did not advance | | | |

Field events

| Athlete | Event | Qualification | | Final | |
| Athlete | Event | Distance | Position | Distance | Position |
|---|---|---|---|---|---|
| Mickaël Conjungo | Discus throw | 57.46 | 24 | Did not advance | |

Women
Track and road events

| Athlete | Event | Heats | | Quarterfinal | | Semifinal | | Final | |
| Athlete | Event | Result | Rank | Result | Rank | Result | Rank | Result | Rank |
|---|---|---|---|---|---|---|---|---|---|
| Brigitte Nganaye | 800 metres | 2:15.70 | 31 | — | | Did not advance | | | |
| Brigitte Nganaye | 1500 metres | 4:33.57 | 35 | — | | Did not advance | | | |

== Cycling ==
Four male cyclists represented the Central African Republic in 1992.

=== Road ===
Men

| Athlete | Event | Time | Rank |
|---|---|---|---|
| Vincent Gomgadja | Road race | DNF | |
| Obed Ngaite | Road race | DNF | |
| Christ Yarafa | Road race | DNF | |
| Rufin Molomadan; Vincent Gomgadja; Obed Ngaite; Christ Yarafa | Team time trial | 2:49:28 | 29 |

== Judo ==
Men

| Athlete | Event | Round of 64 | Round of 32 | Round of 16 | Quarterfinals | Semifinals | Repechage | | | Final | |
| Athlete | Event | Round of 64 | Round of 32 | Round of 16 | Quarterfinals | Semifinals | Round 1 | Round 2 | Round 3 | Final | |
| Athlete | Event | Opposition Result | Opposition Result | Opposition Result | Opposition Result | Opposition Result | Opposition Result | Opposition Result | Opposition Result | Opposition Result | Rank |
|---|---|---|---|---|---|---|---|---|---|---|---|
| Siméon Toronlo | 71 kg | Bye | Boldbaatar (MGL); L | Did not advance | | | | | | | |
| André Mayounga | 86 kg | Bye | Isako (ZAI); L | Did not advance | | | | | | | |

Women

| Athlete | Event | Round of 32 | Round of 16 | Quarterfinals | Semifinals | Repechage | | | Final | |
| Athlete | Event | Round of 32 | Round of 16 | Quarterfinals | Semifinals | Round 1 | Round 2 | Round 3 | Final | |
| Athlete | Event | Opposition Result | Opposition Result | Opposition Result | Opposition Result | Opposition Result | Opposition Result | Opposition Result | Opposition Result | Rank |
|---|---|---|---|---|---|---|---|---|---|---|
| Felicité Makounawode | 61 kg | Jánošíková (TCH); L | Did not advance | | | | | | | |
