= Central African Republic at the 2020 Summer Olympics =

- Flag of the Central African Republic
- IOC code: CAF
- NOC: Comité National Olympique et Sportif Centrafricain

in Tokyo July 23, 2021 – August 8, 2021
- Competitors: 2 in 2 sports
- Flag bearers (opening): Chloe Sauvourel; Francky Mbotto
- Flag bearer (closing): N/A
- Medals: Gold 0 Silver 0 Bronze 0 Total 0

Summer Olympics appearances (overview)
- 1968; 1972–1980; 1984; 1988; 1992; 1996; 2000; 2004; 2008; 2012; 2016; 2020; 2024

The Central African Republic competed at the 2020 Summer Olympics in Tokyo. Originally scheduled to take place from 24 July to 9 August 2020, the Games have been postponed to 23 July to 8 August 2021, because of the COVID-19 pandemic. It was the nation's eleventh appearance at the Summer Olympics after its debut at the 1968 Summer Olympics.

Central African Republic was represented by three athletes who competed across two sports. Chloe Sauvourel and Francky Mbotto served as the country's flag-bearers during the opening ceremony and a volunteer carried the flag during the closing ceremony. The nation did not win any medals in the Games.

== Background ==
The National Olympic Committee (Comité National Olympique et Sportif Centrafricain) of Central Africal Republic was formed in 1961 and was approved by the International Olympic Committee (IOC) in 1965. The 1968 Summer Olympics marked Central African Republic's first participation as an independent nation in the Olympic Games. After the nation made its debut in the Summer Olympics at the 1968 Games, Central African Republic failed to register any athletes at the 1972 Summer Olympics in Munich, and was part of the African and United States-led boycotts in 1976 and 1980, respectively. It has competed in every Summer Olympics since 1976. This edition of the Games in 2020 marked the nation's eleventh appearance at the Summer Games.

The 2020 Summer Olympics in Tokyo was originally scheduled to take place from 24 July to 9 August 2020. The Games were later postponed to 23 July to 8 August 2021 due to the COVID-19 pandemic. Central African Republic was represented by three athletes who competed across two sports. Chloe Sauvourel and Francky Mbotto served as the country's flag-bearer during the opening ceremony and a volunteer carried the flag during the closing ceremony. The nation did not win any medals in the Games, and it has not yet won a medal at the Olympics.

== Competitors ==
The nation was represented by two athletes who competed across two sports.

Sport	Men	Women	Total
Athletics	1	0	1
Swimming	0	1	1
Total	1	1	2

== Athletics ==
As per the governing body World Athletics (WA), a NOC was allowed to enter up to three qualified athletes in each individual event and one qualified relay team if the Olympic Qualifying Standards (OQS) for the respective events had been met during the qualifying period. The remaining places were allocated based on the World Athletics Rankings which were derived from the average of the best five results for an athlete over the designated qualifying period, weighted by the importance of the meet. The Central African Republic received a universality slot from the World Athletics to send one male athlete to the Olympics. This was the second consecutive Olympic participation for Mbotto, having competed in the same event four years ago in 2016. In the men's 800 m event, Francky Mbotto clocked a new national record time of one minute and 48.26 seconds. However, this was not enough to send him through to the next round.

Key

- Note–Ranks given for track events are within the athlete's heat only
- Q = Qualified for the next round
- q = Qualified for the next round as a fastest loser or, in field events, by position without achieving the qualifying target
- NR = National record
- N/A = Round not applicable for the event
- Bye = Athlete not required to compete in round

Track & road events

Athlete	Event	Heat		Semifinal		Final	
Athlete	Event	Result	Rank	Result	Rank	Result	Rank
Francky Mbotto	Men's 800 m	1:48.26 NR	8	Did not advance			

== Swimming ==
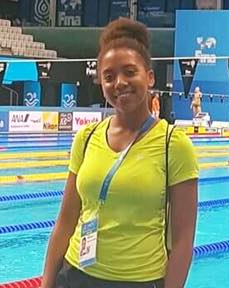
Chloe Sauvourel

As per the Fédération internationale de natation (FINA) guidelines, a NOC was permitted to enter a maximum of two qualified athletes in each individual event, who have achieved the Olympic Qualifying Time (OQT). If the quota was not filled, one athlete per event was allowed to enter, provided they achieved the Olympic Selection Time (OST). The qualifying time standards should have been achieved in competitions approved by World Aquatics in the period between 1 March 2019 to 27 June 2021. FINA also allowed NOCs to enter swimmers (one per gender) under a universality place even if they have not achieved the standard entry times (OQT/OST).

Central African Republic received a universality invitation from FINA to send a top-ranked female swimmer in her respective individual event to the Olympics, based on the FINA Points System of June 28, 2021. This was the second Olympics for Sauvourel, who also served as the country's flag bearer during the 2016 Summer Olympics opening ceremony. She finished 75th in the heats in the women's 50 m freestyle event and did not advance to the finals.

Athlete	Event	Heat		Semifinal		Final	
Athlete	Event	Time	Rank	Time	Rank	Time	Rank
Chloe Sauvourel	Women's 50 m freestyle	32.18	75	Did not advance			
