= List of Central African Republic records in athletics =

The following are the national records in athletics in Central African Republic maintained by Central African Republic's national athletics federation: Fédération Centrafricaine d'Athlétisme (FCA).

== Outdoor ==
Key to tables: Awaiting ratification Record not kept by FCA Not ratified or later rescinded by FCA

=== Men ===
Event	Record	Athlete	Date	Meet	Place	Ref.
100 m	10.33 (+1.7 m/s)	Yvon Rodrigue Sialo-Ngboda	21 July 2006		Tomblaine, France	
100 m	10.25 h NWI	Béranger Aymard Bosse	24 April 2007		Ouagadougou, Burkina Faso	
200 m	21.01 (+0.4 m/s)	Béranger Aymard Bosse	21 June 2014		Amiens, France	
200 m	20.75 h NWI	Béranger Aymard Bosse	24 April 2007		Ouagadougou, Burkina Faso	
400 m	47.82	Martial Biguet	1 August 1992	Olympic Games	Barcelona, Spain	
800 m	1:48.26	Francky Mbotto	30 July 2021	Olympic Games	Tokyo, Japan	
1500 m	3:48.07	Arnold Gabin Kangai	8 June 2005		Saint-Maur, France	
3000 m	8:17.3 h	Christian Yago	24 July 1996		Saint-Maur, France	
5000 m	14:18.3 h	Christian Yago	19 June 1996		Saint-Maur, France	
10,000 m	30:41.5 h	Jules Yadagba	12 July 2003		Bangui, Central African Republic	
10 km (road)	32:49	Guy Dede Newan (Note: dual citizenship unclear; French citizenship by result source)	19 March 2023	10 km de Saint-Médard-en-Jalles	Saint-Médard-en-Jalles, France	
Marathon	2:18:06	Ernest Ndjissipou	30 August 2003	World Championships	Paris, France	
110 m hurdles	14.76 NWI	Jacques-Henri Brunet	2 July 1994		Montgeron, France	
400 m hurdles	50.77	Lucien Panojikola	4 July 2008		Marseille, France	
3000 m steeplechase	8:51.22	Christian Yago	14 June 2000		Saint-Maur, France	
High jump	2.06 m	Fidèle Bakamba	3 April 1977		Ile-Ife, Nigeria	
Pole vault	3.80 m	Mickaël Conjungo	30 April 1989		Noisy-le-Grand, France	
Long jump	7.61 m NWI	Wilfried Dorombo	15 June 1997		Nogent-sur-Oise, France	
Triple jump	15.47 m NWI	William Bangahingui	10 July 1993		Lens, France	
Shot put	14.44 m	Mickaël Conjungo	12 May 1994		Clermont-Ferrand, France	
Discus throw	63.78 m	Mickaël Conjungo	7 July 1994		Sorgues, France	
Hammer throw	38.96 m	Mickaël Conjungo	26 May 1993		Antony, France	
Javelin throw	62.62 m	Mickaël Conjungo	12 June 1999		Argentan, France	
Decathlon	5856 pts	Simon Dégoto	26–27 July 1978	All-Africa Games	Algiers, Algeria	
Decathlon	100m / Long jump / Shot put / High jump / 400m / 110m H / Discus / Pole vault / Javelin / 1500m; 11.44 / 6.49 m / 10.93 m / 1.85 m / 51.16 / 16.61 / 27.00 m / 2.80 m / 48.12 m / 5:14.28					
20 km walk (road)						
50 km walk (road)						
4 × 100 m relay	41.3 h	Central African Republic; E. Paouli; A. Toro; R. Mbetingueret; T. Ngbangandimbo	8 July 1976		Libreville, Gabon	
4 × 400 m relay	3:11.91	Central African Republic; Martial Biguet; E. Toupane; Zacharia Maidjida; Valentin Ngbogo	13 July 1994	Jeux de la Francophonie	Bondoufle, France	

=== Women ===
Event	Record	Athlete	Date	Meet	Place	Ref.
100 m	11.93	Emmanuelle Kogalama	21 May 1998		Tergnier, France	
200 m	23.97 (+1.8 m/s)	Emmanuelle Kogalama	21 June 1998		Viry-Châtillon, France	
400 m	54.61	Emmanuelle Kogalama	30 June 2001		Saint-Étienne, France	
800 m	2:11.70	Victoire Elisabeth Mandaba	17 August 2016	Olympic Games	Rio de Janeiro, Brazil	
1500 m	4:33.57	Brigitte Nganaye	5 August 1992	Olympic Games	Barcelona, Spain	
3000 m	10:08.59	Martine Bayo Hirchenhahn	1 June 2000		Hombourg, France	
5000 m	17:48.09	Martine Bayo Hirchenhahn	1 July 2000		Obernai, France	
10,000 m	40:07.49	Virginie Gloum	6 August 1995		Gothenburg, Sweden	
Marathon	3:28:41	Virginie Gloum	11 June 1994		Bondoufle, France	
100 m hurdles	13.51 (+0.1 m/s)	Maria-Joëlle Conjungo	25 August 2003	World Championships	St. Denis, France	
400 m hurdles	1:03.14	Mireille Bara'ang	7 July 1991		Dreux, France	
3000 m steeplechase						
High jump	1.62 m	Christiane Yamayélé	15 March 1972		Bangui, Central African Republic	
Pole vault	2.00 m	Chancela Moundo	25 May 2006		Marseille, France	
Pole vault	2.00 m	Chancela Moundo	18 June 2006		Miramas, France	
Long jump	5.65 m	Nicole Tombézogo	22 May 1983		Bangui, Central African Republic	
Triple jump	12.12 m	Marie-Joëlle Conjungo	5 April 1999		Réduit, Mauritius	
Shot put	14.68 m	Nadège Nakombo	17 October 1999		Dreux, France	
Discus throw	39.54 m	Nadège Nakombo	13 July 1997		Villeneuve d'Ascq, France	
Hammer throw	21.51 m	Chancela Moundo	6 May 2007		Avignon, France	
Hammer throw	65.84 m	Xena Ngomateke (Note: eligibility unclear, in 2024 Ngomateke started for FRA, ESP and CAF)	22 June 2024	African Championships	Douala, Cameroon	
Javelin throw	36.96 m	Nadège Nakombo	14 May 2000		Montbéliard, France	
Heptathlon	4709 pts h	Octavie Kongomgbé	30 April-1 May 2000		Bangui, Central African Republic	
Heptathlon	100m H / High jump / Shot put / 200m / Long jump / Javelin / 800m					
20 km walk (road)						
4 × 100 m relay	49.3 h	Central African Republic; A. Ayard; Brigitte Nganaye; Evodie Saramandji; Denise Ouabangui	31 July 1999		Garoua, Cameroon	
4 × 400 m relay	3:57.4	Central African Republic; Denise Ouabangui; Mireille Bara'ang; G. Maradas; Brigitte Nganaye	27 February 1993		Bangui, Central African Republic	

== Indoor ==
=== Men ===
Event	Record	Athlete	Date	Meet	Place	Ref.
60 m	6.64	Béranger-Aymard Bossé	28 February 2014	Moselle Athleror Meet	Metz, France	
200 m	21.02	Valentin Ngbogo	12 January 1995		Liévin, France	
400 m	49.48	Béranger-Aymard Bossé	24 January 2015		Reims, France	
400 m	48.85	Badou-Bereingue Bossé	4 December 2022		Reims, France	
800 m	1:51.36	Francky-Edgard Mbotto	21 January 2024	Championnats de Bretagne	Rennes, France	
1500 m	4:05.23	Arnold Gabin Kangai	5 December 2004		Eaubonne, France	
3000 m	9:11.24	Guy Dede Newan	2023		Bordeaux, France	
60 m hurdles						
High jump						
Pole vault	2.40 m	Jonathan Kengba-Koyangba	12 December 2004		Salon-de-Provence, France	
Long jump	6.44 m	Wilfried Panguére-Lebrun	11 January 2009		Vittel, France	
Triple jump	14.80 m	Wilfried Dorombo	14 January 1995		Nogent-sur-Maine, France	
Shot put						
Heptathlon						
Heptathlon	100m H / High jump / Shot put / 200m / Long jump / Javelin / 800m					
5000 m walk						
4 × 400 m relay						

=== Women ===
Event	Record	Athlete	Date	Meet	Place	Ref.
60 m	7.79	Victoria Mackpayen	9 February 2019		Paris, France	
200 m	24.80	Emmanuelle Kogalama	14 February 1999	Indoor Flanders Meeting	Ghent, Belgium	
400 m	55.63	Emmanuelle Kogalama	15 February 1998		Bordeaux, France	
800 m	3:17.84	Chancela Moundo	18 December 2005		Salon-de-Provence, France	
1500 m						
3000 m						
60 m hurdles	8.38	Marie-Joelle Conjungo	4 February 2001		Paris, France	
60 m hurdles	8.38	Marie-Joelle Conjungo	7 February 2003		Eaubonne, France	
High jump	1.54 m	Gelica Damba	25 November 2001		Eaubonne, France	
Pole vault	1.80 m	Chancela Moundo	30 November 2008		L'Isle-sur-la-Sorgue, France	
Long jump	5.28 m	Estella-Divine Zouga	20 February 2015		Val-de-Reuil, France	
Triple jump	9.39 m	Sonia Kombro	16 January 2005		Reims, France	
Shot put	13.93 m	Nadege Nakombo	23 January 1999		Vittel, France	
Pentathlon						
Pentathlon	60m H / High jump / Shot put / Long jump / 800m					
3000 m walk						
4 × 400 m relay						
