= Central African Republic at the 2004 Summer Olympics =

- Flag of the Central African Republic
- IOC code: CAF
- NOC: Central African National Olympic and Sports Committee

in Athens
- Competitors: 4 in 3 sports
- Flag bearer: Ernest Ndjissipou
- Medals: Gold 0 Silver 0 Bronze 0 Total 0

Summer Olympics appearances (overview)
- 1968; 1972–1980; 1984; 1988; 1992; 1996; 2000; 2004; 2008; 2012; 2016; 2020; 2024

The Central African Republic was represented at the 2004 Summer Olympics in Athens, Greece by the Central African National Olympic and Sports Committee.

In total, four athletes including two men and two women represented the Central African Republic in three different sports including athletics, judo and taekwondo.

== Competitors ==
In total, four athletes represented the Central African Republic at the 2004 Summer Olympics in Athens, Greece across three different sports.

Sport	Men	Women	Total
Athletics	1	1	2
Judo	0	1	1
Taekwondo	1	0	1
Total	2	2	4

== Athletics ==
In total, two Central African athletes participated in the athletics events – Maria-Joëlle Conjungo in the women's 100 m hurdles and Ernest Ndjissipou in the men's marathon.

The men's marathon took place on 29 August 2004. Ndjissipou completed the course in a time of two hours 21 minutes 33 seconds to finish in 44th place overall.

Athlete	Event	Final	
Athlete	Event	Result	Rank
Ernest Ndjissipou	Marathon	2:21:23	44

The heats for the women's 100 m hurdles took place on 22 August 2004. Conjungo finished eighth in her heat in a time of 14.24 seconds and she did not advance to the semi-finals.

Athlete	Event	Heat		Semifinal		Final	
Athlete	Event	Result	Rank	Result	Rank	Result	Rank
Maria-Joëlle Conjungo	100 m hurdles	14.24	8	did not advance			

== Judo ==
In total, one Central African athlete participated in the judo events – Bertille Ali in the women's −48 kg category.

The women's –48 kg category took place on 14 August 2004. In the first round, Ali lost by ippon to Soraya Haddad of Algeria.

Athlete	Event	Round of 32	Round of 16	Quarterfinals	Semifinals	Repechage 1	Repechage 2	Repechage 3	Final / BM	
Athlete	Event	Opposition Result	Opposition Result	Opposition Result	Opposition Result	Opposition Result	Opposition Result	Opposition Result	Opposition Result	Rank
Bertille Ali	Women's −48 kg	Haddad (ALG); L 0000–1110	did not advance							

== Taekwondo ==
In total, one Central African athlete participated in the taekwondo events – Bertrand Gbongou Liango in the men's −68 kg category.

Liango led a score of 4–1 against Austria's Tuncay Çalışkan, but he was knocked unconscious during his match. Following a mouth-to-mouth resuscitation, he was taken to hospital and diagnosed with a concussion.

Athlete	Event	Round of 16	Quarterfinals	Semifinals	Repechage 1	Repechage 2	Final / BM	
Athlete	Event	Opposition Result	Opposition Result	Opposition Result	Opposition Result	Opposition Result	Opposition Result	Rank
Bertrand Gbongou Liango	Men's −68 kg	Çalışkan (AUT); L KO	did not advance					

== See also ==
- Central African Republic at the 2004 Summer Paralympics
