= Central African Republic at the 2015 World Aquatics Championships =

- Flag of the Central African Republic
- FINA code: CAF
- National federation: Central African Republic Swimming Federation
- Website: fcn-rca.cabanova.fr

in Kazan, Russia
- Competitors: 3 in 1 sport
- Medals: Gold 0 Silver 0 Bronze 0 Total 0

World Aquatics Championships appearances
- 2009; 2011; 2013; 2015; 2017; 2019; 2022; 2023; 2024

Central African Republic competed at the 2015 World Aquatics Championships in Kazan, Russia from 24 July to 9 August 2015.

== Swimming ==
Swimmers from the Central African Republic have achieved qualifying standards in the following events (up to a maximum of 2 swimmers in each event at the A-standard entry time, and 1 at the B-standard):

Men

Athlete	Event	Heat		Semifinal		Final	
Athlete	Event	Time	Rank	Time	Rank	Time	Rank
Christian Nassif	50 m breaststroke	DSQ		Did not advance			
Shad Perriere	50 m freestyle	DNS		Did not advance			

Women

Athlete	Event	Heat		Semifinal		Final	
Athlete	Event	Time	Rank	Time	Rank	Time	Rank
Chloe Sauvourel	50 m freestyle	46.55	112	Did not advance			
