= Central African Republic at the 2017 World Aquatics Championships =

- Flag of the Central African Republic
- FINA code: CAF
- National federation: Central African Republic Swimming Federation
- Website: fcn-rca.cabanova.fr

in Budapest, Hungary
- Competitors: 1 in 1 sport
- Medals: Gold 0 Silver 0 Bronze 0 Total 0

World Aquatics Championships appearances
- 2009; 2011; 2013; 2015; 2017; 2019; 2022; 2023; 2024

The Central African Republic competed at the 2017 World Aquatics Championships in Budapest, Hungary from 14 July to 30 July.

== Swimming ==
Central African Republic has received a Universality invitation from FINA to send a female swimmer to the World Championships.

| Athlete | Event | Heat | | Semifinal | | Final | |
| Athlete | Event | Time | Rank | Time | Rank | Time | Rank |
|---|---|---|---|---|---|---|---|
| Chloe Sauvourel | Women's 50 m freestyle | 35.04 | 83 | did not advance | | | |
