= Central African Republic at the 2008 Summer Olympics =

- Flag of the Central African Republic
- IOC code: CAF
- NOC: Comité National Olympique et Sportif Centrafricain

in Beijing
- Competitors: 3 in 2 sports
- Flag bearer: Mireille Derebona
- Medals: Gold 0 Silver 0 Bronze 0 Total 0

Summer Olympics appearances (overview)
- 1968; 1972–1980; 1984; 1988; 1992; 1996; 2000; 2004; 2008; 2012; 2016; 2020; 2024; 2028

The Central African Republic sent three competitors to the 2008 Summer Olympics in Beijing, China. Béranger Bosse and Mireille Derebona represented the nation in track events, while Bruno Bongongo participated on the Central African Republic's behalf in boxing. Of those athletes, none progressed past the first rounds of their events. The appearance of the Central African delegation at the Beijing Olympics marked its eighth appearance since the nation's debut at the 1968 Summer Olympics in Mexico City and its seventh consecutive appearance at the Summer Olympics. At the ceremonies, Derebona was the nation's flag bearer.

== Background ==
The Central African Republic is a former French colony of approximately 5 million people situated in the heart of Africa. The nation borders the Democratic Republic of the Congo for most of its southern border, the coastal nation of Cameroon to its west, South Sudan to its east, and Chad to its north. The nation declared its independence from France in 1960. Some eight years after its independence at the Mexico City 1968 Summer Olympics, the first Central African delegation debuted in the Olympic games. It sent a single male athlete to participate at those games, and did not send another delegation again for another three Olympics. The nation returned at the 1984 Summer Olympics in Los Angeles, and sent its largest delegations (15 athletes) at the 1988 Summer Olympics in Seoul and the 1992 Summer Olympics in Barcelona, and sent its first female athletes to the Barcelona games. In total, the Central African Republic competed at eight games between its 1968 debut and its appearance at the 2008 Beijing Olympics. In its history up to Beijing, the Central African Republic has not sent an athlete that has won a medal.

Three athletes represented the Central African Republic. Two men and one woman participated across two different sports (boxing and track and field) and three distinct events. Mireille Derebona-Ngaisset was the nation's flag bearer at the ceremonies.

== Athletics ==
Béranger Aymard Bosse represented the Central African Republic at the Beijing Olympics as one of its sprinters. Bosse participated in the men's 100 meters dash, the only Central African both in that event and in any men's event in Beijing. Bosse had not previously competed in any known Olympic games. During the qualification round, which occurred on 14 August, Bosse participated in the eight-person second heat. He finished the event with a time of 10.51 seconds, placing sixth ahead of Tonga's Aisea Tohi (11.17 seconds) and behind Poland's Dariusz Kuc (10.44 seconds). The leaders of Bosse's heat included first place finalist Asafa Powell of Jamaica (10.16 seconds) and second place finalist Kim Collins of Saint Kitts and Nevis (10.17 seconds). Of the 80 athletes who finished the event, Bosse placed 45th. He did not advance to later rounds.

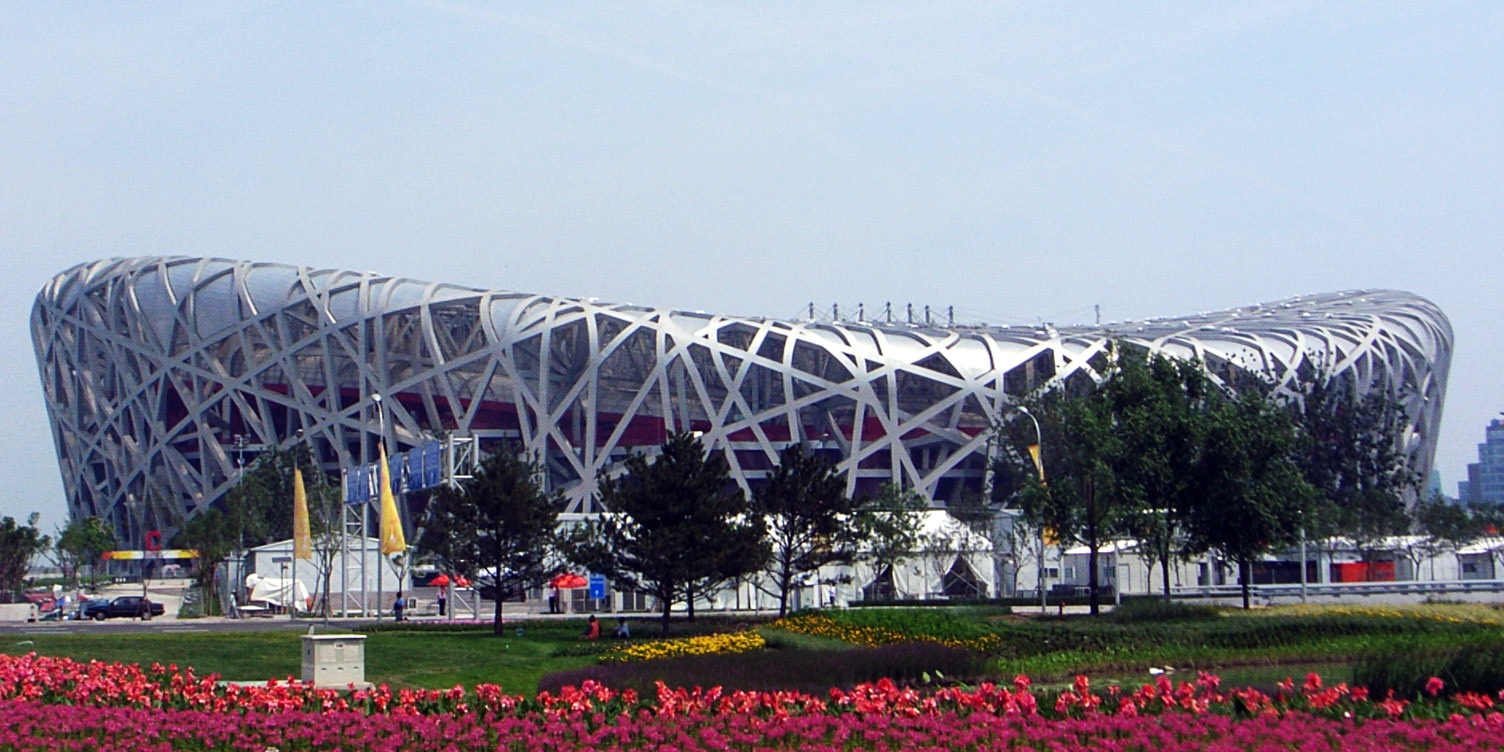
The Beijing National Stadium, where Derebona-Ngaisset and Bosse participated in their events

Mireille Derebona-Ngaisset participated on the Central African Republic's behalf as a sprinter. She took part in the women's 800 meters for the country, and was the only female Central African athlete at Beijing's Olympic games. Born in 1990, Derebona-Ngaisset was 18 years old at the time of her participation in the Beijing Olympics. The qualification round for the event took place on 14 August, where Derebona-Ngaisset took place in the sixth heat against six other athletes. She was, however, disqualified, and did not rank in the event. The leaders of Derebona-Ngaisset's heat included Kenya's Janeth Jepkosgei Busienei (1:59.72) and the Ukraine's Tetiana Petlyuk (2:00.00). Of the 42 athletes participating in the event's qualification round, Mireille Derebona-Ngaisset was one of two athletes who did not finish (the other was the United States' Nicole Teter) and the only one in the event to be disqualified that year.

Athlete	Event	Heat		Quarterfinal		Semifinal		Final	
Athlete	Event	Result	Rank	Result	Rank	Result	Rank	Result	Rank
Béranger Bosse	Men's 100 m	10.51	6	Did not advance					
Mireille Derebona	Women's 800 m	DSQ		—N/a		Did not advance			

Key

- Note–Ranks given for track events are within the athlete's heat only
- Q = Qualified for the next round
- q = Qualified for the next round as a fastest loser or, in field events, by position without achieving the qualifying target
- NR = National record
- N/A = Round not applicable for the event
- Bye = Athlete not required to compete in round
- DSQ = Disqualified

== Boxing ==
Bruno Bongongo participated in boxing in the men's welterweight class (69 kilograms in weight and below), and was the only Central African participated in any event outside track and field that year. Born in 1985, Bongongo was 23 at the time he participated in Beijing. He had not previously participated in any Olympic games. Bongongo participated in the preliminary round of the event on 10 August, facing Cameroon's Joseph Mulema in the fifth bout. Bruno Bongongo was defeated when Mulema scored 17 punches on him, while Bongongo only scored two in return. Of those two punches, Bongongo scored one in the third round, and another in the fourth. He did not advance to later rounds.

Athlete	Event	Round of 32	Round of 16	Quarterfinals	Semifinals	Final	
Athlete	Event	Opposition Result	Opposition Result	Opposition Result	Opposition Result	Opposition Result	Rank
Bruno Bongongo	Welterweight	Mulema (CMR); L 2–17	Did not advance				
