= Central African Republic at the 2012 Summer Paralympics =

- Flag of the Central African Republic
- IPC code: CAF
- NPC: Comité National Paralympique Centrafricain

in London
- Competitors: 1 in 1 sport
- Flag bearer: Clemarot Nikoua-Rosel
- Medals: Gold 0 Silver 0 Bronze 0 Total 0

Summer Paralympics appearances (overview)
- 2004; 2008; 2012; 2016; 2020; 2024

The Central African Republic competed at the 2012 Summer Paralympics in London, United Kingdom from August 29 to September 9, 2012.

== Athletics ==
Men's field

Athlete	Event	Distance	Rank
Clemarot Nikoua-Rosel	Shot put F40	9.68	12
Clemarot Nikoua-Rosel	Javelin throw F40	40.59 AF	6

== See also ==
- Central African Republic at the Paralympics
- Central African Republic at the 2012 Summer Olympics
