= Central African Republic at the 2004 Summer Paralympics =

- Flag of the Central African Republic
- IPC code: CAF
- NPC: Comité National Paralympique Centrafricain

in Athens
- Competitors: 1 in 1 sport
- Medals: Gold 0 Silver 0 Bronze 0 Total 0

Summer Paralympics appearances (overview)
- 2004; 2008; 2012; 2016; 2020; 2024

The Central African Republic made its Paralympic Games debut by sending a delegation to compete at the 2004 Summer Paralympics in Athens, Greece, having made its Olympic debut in 1968. The delegation consisted in a single athlete, Thibaut Bomaya, who competed in the powerlifting. He did not win a medal, finishing in 11th place in the single round for the men's 56kg.

== Background ==
The Central African Republic first participated in a Summer Olympics at the 1968 Games in Mexico City, Mexico. They participated on seven occasions up to and including the 2004 Summer Olympics in Athens, Greece, but failed to win any medals along the way.

Members representing the Central African Republic joined the International Paralympic Committee in 2001, and made debut attendance at the IPC General Assembly in Athens on 7 December that year. The nation made its debut at the following Summer Paralympics in 2004, which also took place in Athens.

== Powerlifting ==
The sole competitor for the Central African Republic, Thibaut Bomaya, competed in the men's powerlifting, in the class for those weighing up to 56 kilograms (123 lb). In the single round held, he greatest weight lifted by Bomaya was 90 kilograms (200 lb), placing him in 11th position. He finished ahead of Eduard Gisov of Kyrgyzstan and South Korea's Yoon Sang Jin. In addition, Syria's Youssef Cheikh Younes was disqualified following a positive test for doping; he had previous finished in the bronze medal position. Wang Jian of China won the gold medal, lifting 185 kilograms (408 lb).

Powerlifting

Name	Event	Result	Rank
Thibaut Bomaya	Men's 56kg	90kg	11th

== See also ==
- Central African Republic at the Paralympics
- Central African Republic at the 2004 Summer Olympics
