= Central African Republic at the 2013 World Aquatics Championships =

- Flag of the Central African Republic
- FINA code: CAF
- National federation: Central African Republic Swimming Federation
- Website: fcn-rca.cabanova.fr

in Barcelona, Spain
- Competitors: 3 in 1 sports
- Medals: Gold 0 Silver 0 Bronze 0 Total 0

World Aquatics Championships appearances
- 2009; 2011; 2013; 2015; 2017; 2019; 2022; 2023; 2024

Central African Republic competed at the 2013 World Aquatics Championships in Barcelona, Spain from 19 July to 4 August 2013.

== Swimming ==
Swimmers from the Central African Republic achieved qualifying standards in the following events (up to a maximum of 2 swimmers in each event at the A-standard entry time, and 1 at the B-standard):

Men

| Athlete | Event | Heat | | Semifinal | | Final | |
| Athlete | Event | Time | Rank | Time | Rank | Time | Rank |
|---|---|---|---|---|---|---|---|
| Christian Nassif | 50 m freestyle | 29.79 | 101 | did not advance | | | |
| Croyeb Gailloty | 100 m freestyle | DNS | | did not advance | | | |

Women

| Athlete | Event | Heat | | Semifinal | | Final | |
| Athlete | Event | Time | Rank | Time | Rank | Time | Rank |
|---|---|---|---|---|---|---|---|
| Alexandra Wilman | 50 m freestyle | DNS | | did not advance | | | |
