= Central African Republic at the 2024 Summer Paralympics =

2024 sporting event delegation in Paris

- Flag of Central African Republic
- IPC code: CAF
- NPC: Comité National Paralympique Centrafricain

in Paris, France August 28, 2024 – September 8, 2024
- Competitors: 2 (2 women) in 2 sports
- Flag bearer: Veronica Ndakara
- Medals: Gold 0 Silver 0 Bronze 0 Total 0

Summer Paralympics appearances (overview)
- 2004; 2008; 2012; 2016; 2020; 2024

The Central African Republic competed at the 2024 Summer Paralympics in Paris, France, from 28 August to 8 September 2024.

== Competitors ==
The following is the list of number of competitors in the Games, including game-eligible alternates in team sports.

Sport	Men	Women	Total
Athletics	0	1	1
Taekwondo	0	1	1
Total	0	2	2

== Athletics ==
Field events
Women

Athlete	Event	Final	
Athlete	Event	Result	Rank
Veronica Ndakara	Shot put F41	6.50	9

== Taekwondo ==
Athlete	Event	Preliminary round	First round	Quarterfinals	Repechage 1	Repechage 2	Semifinals	Final / BM	
Athlete	Event	Opposition Result	Opposition Result	Opposition Result	Opposition Result	Opposition Result	Opposition Result	Opposition Result	Rank
Louisette Flora Rene Kimoto Martha	Women's +65kg	Tapari (PNG); L 10-16	Did not advance						

== See also ==
- Central African Republic at the 2024 Summer Olympics
- Central African Republic at the Paralympics
