= Central African Republic at the 2008 Summer Paralympics =

- Flag of the Central African Republic
- IPC code: CAF
- NPC: Comité National Paralympique Centrafricain

in Beijing
- Competitors: 1 in 1 sport
- Flag bearers: Rosel-Clemariot-Christian Nikoua (opening & closing)
- Medals Ranked -th: Gold 0 Silver 0 Bronze 0 Total 0

Summer Paralympics appearances (overview)
- 2004; 2008; 2012; 2016; 2020; 2024

Central African Republic sent a delegation to compete at the 2008 Summer Paralympics in Beijing, People's Republic of China. According to official records, the country's only athlete competed in the athletics.

== Athletics ==
Men

Athlete	Class	Event	Heats		Semifinal		Final		
Athlete	Class	Event	Result	Rank	Result	Rank	Result	Points	Rank
Rosel-Clemariot-Christian Nikoua	F40	Shot put	N/A				8.20	-	14

== See also ==
- Central African Republic at the Paralympics
- Central African Republic at the 2008 Summer Olympics
