= Central African Republic at the 2016 Summer Paralympics =

- Flag of the Central African Republic
- IPC code: CAF
- NPC: Comité National Paralympique Centrafricain

in Rio de Janeiro
- Competitors: 1 in 1 sports
- Flag bearer: Roddy-Mickael Stephane Mokolongo
- Medals: Gold 0 Silver 0 Bronze 0 Total 0

Summer Paralympics appearances (overview)
- 2004; 2008; 2012; 2016; 2020; 2024

Central African Republic competed at the 2016 Summer Paralympics in Rio de Janeiro, Brazil, from 7 September to 18 September 2016.

== Disability classifications ==
Every participant at the Paralympics has their disability grouped into one of five disability categories; amputation, the condition may be congenital or sustained through injury or illness; cerebral palsy; wheelchair athletes, there is often overlap between this and other categories; visual impairment, including blindness; Les autres, any physical disability that does not fall strictly under one of the other categories, for example dwarfism or multiple sclerosis. Each Paralympic sport then has its own classifications, dependent upon the specific physical demands of competition. Events are given a code, made of numbers and letters, describing the type of event and classification of the athletes competing. Some sports, such as athletics, divide athletes by both the category and severity of their disabilities, other sports, for example swimming, group competitors from different categories together, the only separation being based on the severity of the disability.

== Delegation ==
The country sent a team of 1 athlete, a man, to the 2016 Summer Paralympics. He competed in athletics.

== Athletics ==
Roddy-Mickael Stephane Mokolongo represented the Central African Republic at the 2016 Summer Paralympics, competing in the Men's Javelin Throw - F57 and Men's Shot Put - F57 events. The 30-year-old from Brazzaville finished 12th in the javelin throw.

Men's Field

Athlete	Events	Result	Rank
Roddy-Mickael Mokolongo	Shot Put F56-57	7.17	9
Roddy-Mickael Mokolongo	Javelin F56-57	28.32	12

== See also ==
- Central African Republic at the 2016 Summer Olympics
