= Central African Republic at the 2020 Summer Paralympics =

- Flag of the Central African Republic
- IPC code: CAF
- NPC: National Paralympic Committee Central African Republic

in Tokyo, Japan August 24, 2021 – September 5, 2021
- Competitors: 1 (1 woman) in 1 sport
- Medals: Gold 0 Silver 0 Bronze 0 Total 0

Summer Paralympics appearances (overview)
- 2004; 2008; 2012; 2016; 2020; 2024

Central African Republic competed at the 2020 Summer Paralympics in Tokyo, Japan, from 24 August to 5 September 2021. This was their fifth consecutive appearance at the Summer Paralympics since 2004.

== Athletics ==
Women's field

Athlete	Event	Final	
Athlete	Event	Result	Rank
Veronica Ndakara	Shot put F41	6.50 PB	9

== See also ==
- Central African Republic at the Paralympics
- Central African Republic at the 2020 Summer Olympics
