= Central African Republic at the 1968 Summer Olympics =

- Flag of the Central African Republic
- IOC code: CAF (AFC used at these Games)
- NOC: Comité National Olympique et Sportif Centrafricain

in Mexico City
- Medals: Gold 0 Silver 0 Bronze 0 Total 0

Summer Olympics appearances (overview)
- 1968; 1972–1980; 1984; 1988; 1992; 1996; 2000; 2004; 2008; 2012; 2016; 2020; 2024

The Central African Republic competed in the Olympic Games for the first time at the 1968 Summer Olympics in Mexico City, Mexico.

== Gabriel M'Boa ==
The lone athlete representing the Central African Republic was Gabriel M'Boa, also known as Mboa Gabriel. He specialized in the 5000 metres, a long-distance running event. In this event, he set his personal best during a meeting in 1962, recording a time of 15:24:06. The Central African National Olympic and Sports Committee was formed in the early 1960s in hopes of competing at the 1964 Summer Olympics in Tokyo, but was only recognized in time for the 1968 Summer Olympics in Mexico City: for the 1968 Olympics, they sent M'Boa to compete.

M'Boa thus became the first Olympian from the Central African Republic, and he competed in the men's 5000 metres. He was seeded in the first heat and participated on 15 October 1968. In the heat, which featured eventual medalists Mohammed Gammoudi and Kipchoge Keino, M'Boa finished in 13th place out of 14 runners with a time of 17:33, ahead of only Juan Valladares of Honduras. Overall, he had the third-slowest time, beating only Valladares and Clovis Morales. He is not known to have competed at any other international events after the Olympics. The Central African Republic did not send any competitors to the following Olympics, and M'Boa remained his country's only Olympic participant until the 1984 Summer Olympics in Los Angeles.

== Athletics ==
=== Men's 5000m ===
- Gabriel M'Boa – Heat 1, 13th Place (17:33:1)
