= Central African Republic at the 1984 Summer Olympics =

- Flag of the Central African Republic
- IOC code: CAF
- NOC: Comité National Olympique et Sportif Centrafricain

in Los Angeles
- Competitors: 3 in 2 sports
- Flag bearer: André Marie Sayet
- Medals: Gold 0 Silver 0 Bronze 0 Total 0

Summer Olympics appearances (overview)
- 1968; 1972–1980; 1984; 1988; 1992; 1996; 2000; 2004; 2008; 2012; 2016; 2020; 2024

The Central African Republic competed at the 1984 Summer Olympics in Los Angeles, United States. It had been 16 years since the previous appearance of the nation at the Summer Olympics, when it made its debut at the 1968 Games in Mexico City, Mexico. The Central African Republic was represented by three athletes; marathon runner Adolphe Ambowodé and two boxers, Dieudonné Kossi and Antoine Longoudé. There were no medals won by the trio.

== Background ==
The Central African Republic made its debut in the Olympic Games at the 1968 Summer Olympics in Mexico City, Mexico. The country has twice boycotted the Olympic Games, first was because of the inclusion of the New Zealand team at the 1976 Summer Olympics despite the breach of the international sports boycott of South Africa by the nation's rugby union team shortly prior. Then in 1980, the country was one of several who joined in with a United States led boycott over the 1979 invasion of Afghanistan during the Soviet–Afghan War. The highest number of Central African athletes entered in a team for an Olympics is 15, occurring at both the 1988 and 1992 Summer Olympics.

For the 1984 Summer Olympics in Los Angeles, United States, the nation entered three male competitors; Adolphe Ambowodé in the marathon, and two boxers, lightweight Dieudonné Kossi and welterweight Antoine Longoudé.

== Athletics ==
Ambowodé competed in the men's marathon, which took place at a course spread out across Los Angeles on 12 August. He finished in 70th position out of the 78 runners who completed the course, with a time of 2:41:26. He was over 31 minutes outside the fastest three finishers, who each completed the marathon with times of under 2 hours and 10 minutes. The overall winner was Portugal's Carlos Lopes (2:09:21).

Marathon

Event	Athlete	Race	
Event	Athlete	Time	Rank
Men's marathon	Adolphe Ambowodé	2:41:26	70

== Boxing ==
Longoudé fought in the first round of the welterweight tournament against Rudel Obreja of Romania. After losing the bout on points, he did not advance in the competition. Kossi received a bye in the first round of the lightweight tournament, but like his countryman was defeated in his first bout, by Douglas Odame of Ghana.

Boxing

Name	Event	Round of 32	Round of 16	Quarterfinals	Semifinals	Final
Name	Event	Opposition Result	Opposition Result	Opposition Result	Opposition Result	Opposition Result
Dieudonné Kossi	Lightweight	Bye	Odame (GHA); L Points	did not advance		
Antoine Longoudé	Welterweight	Obreja (ROU); L Points	did not advance			
