= Central African Republic at the 2011 World Aquatics Championships =

- Flag of the Central African Republic
- FINA code: CAF
- National federation: Central African Republic Swimming Federation
- Website: fcn-rca.cabanova.fr

in Shanghai, China
- Competitors: 3 in 1 sports
- Medals: Gold 0 Silver 0 Bronze 0 Total 0

World Aquatics Championships appearances
- 2009; 2011; 2013; 2015; 2017; 2019; 2022; 2023; 2024

Central African Republic competed at the 2011 World Aquatics Championships in Shanghai, China between July 16 and 31, 2011.

== Swimming ==
Central African Republic qualified 3 swimmers.

Men

Athlete	Event	Heats		Semifinals		Final	
Athlete	Event	Time	Rank	Time	Rank	Time	Rank
Nassif Christian Djidagui	50 m freestyle	29.71	106	Did not advance			
Gailloty Croyeb	50 m freestyle	35.11	115	Did not advance			

Women

Athlete	Event	Heats		Semifinals		Final	
Athlete	Event	Time	Rank	Time	Rank	Time	Rank
Vandenboss Samira	50 m freestyle	DNS		Did not advance			
