= Central African Republic at the Olympics =

- Flag of the Central African Republic
- IOC code: CAF
- NOC: Comité National Olympique et Sportif Centrafricain
- Medals: Gold 0 Silver 0 Bronze 0 Total 0

Summer appearances
- 1968; 1972–1980; 1984; 1988; 1992; 1996; 2000; 2004; 2008; 2012; 2016; 2020; 2024

The Central African Republic has sent athletes to every Summer Olympic Games held between 1984 and 2024, as well as its first appearance in 1968. The country, however, has yet to win an Olympic medal. No athletes from the Central African Republic have competed in any Winter Olympic Games.

== Medal tables ==
=== Medals by Summer Games ===
| Games | Athletes | Gold | Silver | Bronze | Total | Rank |
| 1968 Mexico City | 1 | 0 | 0 | 0 | 0 | – |
| (West Germany) 1972 Munich | did not participate | | | | | |
| (Canada) 1976 Montreal | did not participate | | | | | |
| (Soviet Union) 1980 Moscow | did not participate | | | | | |
| (United States) 1984 Los Angeles | 3 | 0 | 0 | 0 | 0 | – |
| (South Korea) 1988 Seoul | 15 | 0 | 0 | 0 | 0 | – |
| (Spain) 1992 Barcelona | 16 | 0 | 0 | 0 | 0 | – |
| (United States) 1996 Atlanta | 5 | 0 | 0 | 0 | 0 | – |
| (Australia) 2000 Sydney | 3 | 0 | 0 | 0 | 0 | – |
| (Greece) 2004 Athens | 4 | 0 | 0 | 0 | 0 | – |
| (China) 2008 Beijing | 3 | 0 | 0 | 0 | 0 | – |
| (United Kingdom) 2012 London | 6 | 0 | 0 | 0 | 0 | – |
| (Brazil) 2016 Rio de Janeiro | 6 | 0 | 0 | 0 | 0 | – |
| (Japan) 2020 Tokyo | 2 | 0 | 0 | 0 | 0 | – |
| (France) 2024 Paris | 4 | 0 | 0 | 0 | 0 | – |
| (United States) 2028 Los Angeles | future event | | | | | |
| (Australia) 2032 Brisbane | future event | | | | | |
| Total | | 0 | 0 | 0 | 0 | – |

== See also ==
- List of flag bearers for the Central African Republic at the Olympics
- Central African Republic at the Paralympics
