= Central African Republic at the Paralympics =

- Flag of the Central African Republic
- IPC code: CAF
- NPC: Comité National Paralympique Centrafricain
- Medals: Gold 0 Silver 0 Bronze 0 Total 0

Summer appearances
- 2004; 2008; 2012; 2016; 2020; 2024

The Central African Republic made its Paralympic Games début at the 2004 Summer Paralympics in Athens. It sent a single athlete, Thibaut Bomaya, to compete in powerlifting. The country also entered a single-man delegation at the 2008 Summer Paralympics in Beijing, where Rosel-Clemariot-Christian Nikoua competed in shot put. The Central African Republic has never taken part in the Winter Paralympics, and has never won a Paralympic medal.

The Central African Republic will be taking part in the 2012 Summer Paralympics, and the Comité National Paralympique Centrafricain have chosen Bedford as the UK training base for its Paralympians.

== Medal tables ==
=== Medals by Summer Games ===
Games	Athletes	Gold	Silver	Bronze	Total	Rank
2004 Athens	1	0	0	0	0	-
2008 Beijing	1	0	0	0	0	-
2012 London	1	0	0	0	0	-
2016 Rio de Janeiro	1	0	0	0	0	-
2020 Tokyo	1	0	0	0	0	-
2024 Paris	2	0	0	0	0	-
2028 Los Angeles	Future Event					
2032 Brisbane	Future Event					
Total		0	0	0	0	-

== Full results for the Central African Republic at the Paralympics ==
Name	Games	Sport	Event	Score	Rank
Thibaut Bomaya	2004 Athens	Powerlifting	Men's up to 56 kg	90 kg	11th
Clemariot Nikoua-Rosel	2008 Beijing	Athletics	Men's shot put F40	8.20	14th
Clemariot Nikoua-Rosel	2012 London	Athletics	Men's shot put F40	9.68 m	12th
Clemariot Nikoua-Rosel	2012 London	Athletics	Men's javelin throw F40	40.59 m	6th
Roddy-Mickael Mokolongo	2016 Rio	Athletics	Men's shot put F56/57	7.17 m	9th
Roddy-Mickael Mokolongo	2016 Rio	Athletics	Men's javelin F56/57	28.32 m	12th
Veronica Ndakara	2020 Tokyo	Athletics	Women's shot put F41	6.50	9th
Veronica Ndakara	2024 Paris	Athletics	Women's shot put F41	6.50	9th
Louisette Flora Rene Kimoto Martha	2024 Paris	Taekwondo	Women's +65kg	Lost preliminary round	Did not advance

== See also ==
- Central African Republic at the Olympics
