= Central African Republic at the 2019 World Aquatics Championships =

- Flag of the Central African Republic
- FINA code: CAF
- National federation: Fédération Centrafricaine de Natation

in Gwangju, South Korea
- Competitors: 1 in 1 sport
- Medals: Gold 0 Silver 0 Bronze 0 Total 0

World Aquatics Championships appearances
- 2009; 2011; 2013; 2015; 2017; 2019; 2022; 2023; 2024

Central African Republic competed at the 2019 World Aquatics Championships in Gwangju, South Korea from 12 to 28 July.

== Swimming ==
Central African Republic entered one swimmer.

Women

| Athlete | Event | Heat | | Semifinal | | Final | |
| Athlete | Event | Time | Rank | Time | Rank | Time | Rank |
|---|---|---|---|---|---|---|---|
| Chloe Sauvourel | 50 m freestyle | 32.16 | 91 | did not advance | | | |
