= Central African Republic at the 2024 Summer Olympics =

- Flag of the Central African Republic
- IOC code: CAF
- NOC: Comité National Olympique et Sportif Centrafricain

in Paris, France 26 July 2024 – 11 August 2024
- Competitors: 4 (2 men and 2 women) in 3 sports
- Flag bearers (opening): Terence Tengue & Nadia Matchiko Guimendego
- Flag bearers (closing): Tracy Marine Andet & Herve Toumandji
- Medals: Gold 0 Silver 0 Bronze 0 Total 0

Summer Olympics appearances (overview)
- 1968; 1972–1980; 1984; 1988; 1992; 1996; 2000; 2004; 2008; 2012; 2016; 2020; 2024

The Central African Republic competed at the 2024 Summer Olympics in Paris, France from 26 July to 11 August 2024. Since the Central African Republic's debut in 1968, Central African athletes have appeared in every edition of the Summer Olympic Games, except in 1972, when the NOC failed to register any athletes for the 1972 Summer Olympics in Munich, and was part of the African and United States-led boycotts in 1976 and 1980, respectively.

== Competitors ==
The following list is the number of competitors who competed at the Games.

Sport	Men	Women	Total
Athletics	1	0	1
Judo	0	1	1
Swimming	1	1	2
Total	2	2	4

== Athletics ==
Central African Republic sent one sprinter to compete at the 2024 Summer Olympics.

Key

- Note–Ranks given for track events are within the athlete's heat only
- Q = Qualified for the next round
- q = Qualified for the next round as a fastest loser or, in field events, by position without achieving the qualifying target
- NR = National record
- N/A = Round not applicable for the event
- Bye = Athlete not required to compete in round

Track events

Athlete	Event	Preliminary		Heat		Repechage		Semifinal		Final	
Athlete	Event	Time	Rank	Time	Rank	Time	Rank	Time	Rank	Time	Rank
Herve Toumandji	Men's 100 m	10.76	4	Did not advance		—N/a		Did not advance			

== Judo ==
The Central African Republic qualified one judoka. Nadia Matchiko Guimendego, a French-born judoka, represented the country, marking the nation's return the sport for the first time since 2004. Guimendego's parents are originally from Central African Republic, and migrated to France.

Athlete	Event	Round of 32	Round of 16	Quarterfinals	Semifinals	Repechage	Final / BM	
Athlete	Event	Opposition Result	Opposition Result	Opposition Result	Opposition Result	Opposition Result	Opposition Result	Rank
Nadia Matchiko Guimendego	Women's –63 kg	Krišto (CRO); L 00–11	Did not advance					

== Swimming ==
Central African Republic sent two swimmers to compete at the 2024 Paris Olympics.

Athlete	Event	Heat		Semifinal		Final	
Athlete	Event	Time	Rank	Time	Rank	Time	Rank
Terence Tengue	Men's 50 m freestyle	30.96	73	Did not advance			
Tracy Marine Andet	Women's 50 m freestyle	34.95	76	Did not advance			

Qualifiers for the latter rounds (Q) of all events were decided on a time only basis, therefore positions shown are overall results versus competitors in all heats.
