= Central African Republic at the 2023 World Aquatics Championships =

- Flag of the Central African Republic
- FINA code: CAF
- National federation: Fédération Centrafricaine de Natation

in Fukuoka, Japan
- Competitors: 1 in 1 sport
- Medals: Gold 0 Silver 0 Bronze 0 Total 0

World Aquatics Championships appearances
- 2009; 2011; 2013; 2015; 2017; 2019; 2022; 2023; 2024

Central African Republic is set to compete at the 2023 World Aquatics Championships in Fukuoka, Japan from 14 to 30 July.

== Swimming ==
Central African Republic entered 1 swimmer.

Men

Athlete	Event	Heat		Semifinal		Final	
Athlete	Event	Time	Rank	Time	Rank	Time	Rank
Terence Tengue	50 metre freestyle	32.18	119	Did not advance			
