= Hervé Toumandji =

Central African sprinter (born 1994)

Personal information
- Born: 23 June 1994 (age 32) Bangui
- Height: 1.83 m (6 ft 0 in)

Sport
- Sport: Athletics
- Events: 100 metres; 200 metres; 400 metres; Long jump

Achievements and titles
- Personal bests: 100m: 10.47 (2023); 200m: 21.34 (2022); 400m: 49.41 (2022); Long jump: 7.09 (2023)

Hervé Toumandji (born 23 June 1994) is a French-Central African sprinter, who represents the Central African Republic. He competed in the men's 100 metres event at the 2024 Summer Olympics.

He was the closing ceremony flag bearer for the Central African Republic at the 2024 Summer Olympics.
