= Powerlifting at the 2004 Summer Paralympics – Men's 56 kg =

Men's Up To 56 kg at the XII Paralympic Games
- Paralympic Powerlifting
- Venue: Nikaia Olympic Weightlifting Hall
- Dates: 22 September 2004
- Competitors: 14 from 14 nations
- Winning weight(kg): 185.0

Medalists
1st place, gold medalist(s)		Wang Jian	China
2nd place, silver medalist(s)		Gomma G. Ahmed	Egypt
3rd place, bronze medalist(s)		Rajinder Singh Rahelu	India

The Men's 56 kg powerlifting event at the 2004 Summer Paralympics was competed on 22 September. It was won by Wang Jian, representing China.

== Final round ==
22 Sept. 2004, 13:45

Rank	Athlete	Weight(kg)	Notes
1st place, gold medalist(s)	Wang Jian (CHN)	185.0	
2nd place, silver medalist(s)	Gomma G. Ahmed (EGY)	180.0	
3rd place, bronze medalist(s)	Rajinder Singh Rahelu (IND)	157.5	
4	Danilo Rodriguez Garcia (CUB)	155.0	
5	Krzysztof Owsiany (POL)	155.0	
6	Cheok Kon Fatt (MAS)	142.5	
7	Samson Abayyo Okutto (KEN)	140.0	
8	Jaime Morales (VEN)	140.0	
9	Andrey Podpalnyy (RUS)	132.5	
10	Badar Hamood Saif Al-Harthy (OMA)	125.0	
11	Thibaut Bomaya (CAF)	90.0	
	Eduard Gisov (KGZ)	NMR	
	Yoon Sang Jin (KOR)	NMR	
	Youssef Cheikh Younes (SYR)	DSQ	
