= Ferdinand Amadi =

Central African Republic runner

Ferdinand Amadi (born 18 September 1970) is a marathon runner from the Central African Republic. He represented his country at the 1992 Summer Olympics.

== Achievements ==
- All results regarding marathon, unless stated otherwise

Year	Competition	Venue	Position	Notes
Representing Central African Republic
1992	Olympic Games	Barcelona, Spain	74th	2:35:39
