= Nadia Guimendego =

Central African judoka (born 1997)

Personal information
- Full name: Nadia Matchiko Guimendego
- Born: 27 April 1997 (age 29) Nantes, France
- Occupation: Judoka

Sport
- Country: Central African Republic
- Sport: Judo
- Weight class: ‍–‍63 kg
- Club: Dojo Nantais
- Coached by: Mathieu Pelerin

Achievements and titles
- Olympic Games: R32 (2024)
- World Champ.: R32 (2024)
- African Champ.: (silver) (2024)
Medal record
Women's judo
Representing Central African Republic
African Games
Bronze medal – third place	2023 Accra	‍–‍63 kg
African Championships
Silver medal – second place	2024 Cairo	‍–‍63 kg
Bronze medal – third place	2023 Casablanca	‍–‍63 kg

Profile at external databases
- IJF: 65445
- JudoInside.com: 42773
- Updated on 30 July 2024

Nadia Matchiko Guimendego (born 27 April 1997) is a judoka. Born in France, she represented the Central African Republic at the 2024 Summer Olympics.

== Life ==
Guimendego was born in Nantes on 27 April 1997 to Central African parents. She is currently working as a coordinator of community life at Maison des Confluences in Nantes.

== Career ==
=== Early career ===
Guimendego started practicing judo at the age of 4 by joining the Batignolles club. She then joined Pôle Espoirs and then moved to Pôle, France, in Orléans when she was 14 years old. In October 2013, she suffered a knee injury during training, which forced her to miss all judo competitions until July 2014. She again endured a knee injury during the competition in October 2014 that kept her out of judo until November 2015. In March 2016, she partook in the France 1st Division Judo Championship, representing Dojo Nantais.

=== Central African Republic ===
In 2020, Guimendego decided to represent the Central African Republic in international judo competitions, although at first, she wanted to play for France. She participated in the first international competition representing the Central African Republic in 2021. In 2022, she obtained a gold medal at the Senior African Judo Championship in Oran and a bronze medal at the 2022 Dakar Open. She won a gold medal and silver medal for women's 63 kg category at the 2023 Tunis Open and Algiers Open, respectively. Furthermore, she also participated in the 2023 World Judo Championships and won a silver medal at the 2023 Montreal Open.

During the 2023 African Games in Accra, she earned a bronze medal. In the 2024 African Judo Championships final, she was defeated by Amina Belkadi and gained a silver medal. Other than that, she also won the gold medal in the 2024 Luanda Open. Guimendego qualified for the 2024 Summer Olympics after securing enough points.

Olympic Games
Preceded by Francky Mbotto; Chloe Sauvourel	Flag bearer for Central African Republic; 2024 Paris with Terence Tengue	Succeeded by Incumbent
