= Wang Jian (powerlifter) =

Chinese Paralympic powerlifter

Personal information
- Nationality: Chinese
- Born: Huaibei, China

Sport
- Sport: Paralympic powerlifting
Medal record
Paralympic powerlifting
Representing China
Paralympic Games
Gold medal – first place	2004 Athens	Men's 56kg
Silver medal – second place	1996 Atlanta	Men's 52kg
Silver medal – second place	2016 Rio de Janeiro	Men's 54 kg
Bronze medal – third place	2000 Sydney	Men's 52kg
Bronze medal – third place	2012 London	Men's 56kg
World Championships
Gold medal – first place	2006 Busan	Men's 56kg
Silver medal – second place	1998 Dubai	Men's 52kg
Bronze medal – third place	2002 Kuala Lumpur	Men's 56kg
Asian Para Games
Bronze medal – third place	2010 Guangzhou	Men's 52kg

Wang Jian is a Chinese powerlifter. He has won multiple medals throughout his twenty-year career.
