= Virginie Gloum =

Central African Republic athlete

Personal information
- Nationality: Central African Republic
- Born: 23 August 1972 (age 52)

Sport
- Sport: Long Distance Running
- Event(s): 10000m, Marathon

Virginie Gloum (born 8 June 1968) is a Central African Republic long distance runner. She competed in the women's 10000 metres at the 1996 Summer Olympics. She also ran unofficially in the Women's marathon after an incorrect qualifying time on her entry sheet. Gloum remains the Central African Republic female record holder for both 10000m and marathon times.
