= Jean-Pierre Kotta =

Central African basketball player

Personal information
- Born: 3 May 1956 (age 70)
- Listed height: 6 ft 2 in (1.88 m)
- Listed weight: 165 lb (75 kg)

Jean-Pierre Kotta (born 3 May 1956) is a Central African basketball player. He was a member of the Central African Republic national basketball team at the 1988 Summer Olympics.
