= Jacques-Henri Brunet =

Central African Republic hurdler

Personal information
- Nationality: Central African Republic
- Born: 17 June 1967 (age 59) Bangui
- Height: 188 cm (6 ft 2 in)
- Weight: 72 kg (159 lb)

Sport
- Country: Central African Republic
- Sport: Hurdling

Achievements and titles
- Personal best: 51.84

Jacques-Henri Brunet is a Central African Republic Olympic hurdler. He represented his country in the men's 400 metres hurdles at the 1992 Summer Olympics, finishing with a time of 52.59 in the hurdles. Brunet is also the Central African Republic record holder in the 110 metres hurdles, with a time of 14.76 seconds.
