= Adolphe Ambowodé =

Central African Republic long-distance runner

Personal information
- Full name: Adolphe Ambowodé
- Nationality: Central African
- Born: 13 February 1958 (age 68)
- Height: 173 cm (5.68 ft)
- Weight: 59 kg (130 lb)

Adolphe Ambowodé (born 13 February 1958) is a Central African long-distance runner. He first competed on behalf of the nation at the 1984 Summer Olympics in the men's marathon. He had placed 70th, though was the first Central African athlete to compete in the marathon at an Olympic Games.

He then competed at the 1988 Summer Olympics, also participating in the men's marathon. He had placed 42nd and set a new personal best in the event.

== Biography ==
Adolphe Ambowodé was born on 13 February 1958. He is 173 centimetres (5.68 feet) tall and weighs 59 kilograms (130 pounds).

Ambowodé competed as part of the Central African Republican team at the 1984 Summer Olympics in Los Angeles, United States. He competed in the men's marathon on 12 August 1984 against 107 other competitors at the Los Angeles Memorial Coliseum. He had placed 70th with a time of 2:41:26. The winner of the event was Carlos Lopes of Portugal who had run in a time of 2:09:21 and set a new Olympic record in the event. Though not earning a medal, he would be the first Central African competitor to compete in the marathon at an Olympic Games.

Four years later, he again competed on behalf of the country, competing at the 1988 Summer Olympics in Seoul, South Korea. At his second appearance at an Olympic Games, he competed in the men's marathon on 2 October 1988 against 117 other competitors at the Seoul Olympic Stadium. He had placed 42nd and ran in a time of 2:23:52, setting a new personal best in the event. The winner of the event was Gelindo Bordin of Italy who had run in a time of 2:10:59.
