= Mireille Derebona =

Central African middle distance runner (born 1990)

Mireille Derebona-Ngaisset (born 19 May 1990) is a Central African middle distance runner who specializes in the 800 metres.

She competed at the 2007 World Championships, but was knocked out in the first round. At the 2008 Olympic Games she was the flag bearer for the Central African Republic at the opening ceremony. She competed in heat six of the 800 metres, but was disqualified.

Her personal best time is 2:22.0 minutes, achieved in June 2006 in Garoua.

Olympic Games
Preceded by Ernest Ndissipou	Flagbearer for Central African Republic; 2008 Beijing	Succeeded by David Boui
