= Henriette Youanga =

Central African Republic archer (born 1958)

Henriette Youanga (born 1 January 1958) is an archer from the Central African Republic. She represented the Central African Republic in archery at the 2000 Summer Olympics in Sydney.

== Olympic Games ==
Youanga finished 63rd out of 64 in the ranking round. She lost 166-126 to second seed Natalia Valeeva in the round of 64.
