= Bertrand Gbongou Liango =

Central African taekwondo practitioner

Medal record

Men's taekwondo

Representing Central African Republic

All-Africa Games
Gold medal – first place	2003 Abuja	Featherweight

Bertrand Gbongou Liango (born April 2, 1982) is a Central African taekwondo athlete.

He was the 2003 African featherweight champion and competed in the men's 68 kg class at the 2004 Summer Olympics. However, Liango was knocked unconscious during his first round match against Tuncay Caliskan of Austria. Following mouth-to-mouth resuscitation, he was taken to hospital and diagnosed with a concussion. He had been leading 4-1.
