= Elisabeth Mandaba =

Central African Republic middle-distance runner

Elisabeth Mandaba (born 7 June 1989) is a middle-distance runner from the Central African Republic. At the 2012 Summer Olympics and 2016 Summer Olympics, she competed in the Women's 800 metres.

She was born in Bangui. She also represented her country at the 2013 World Championships in Athletics and the 2013 Summer Universiade, setting a national record of 58.35 seconds in the 400 metres at the latter event.

In 2016, she set the national record for the 800m with a time of 2:11.70.
