= David Boui =

Central African taekwondo practitioner

David Sylvère Patrick Boui (born 28 June 1988, in Bangui) is a Central African Republican taekwondo practitioner. At the 2012 Summer Olympics, he competed in the Men's –68 kg competition and lost to silver medalist Mohammad Bagheri Motamed of Iran in the first round and to Afghan bronze medalist Rohullah Nikpai in the repechage. At the 2016 Olympics, he lost to Lee Dae-hoon in the first round.

Olympic Games
Preceded by Mireille Derebona	Flagbearer for Central African Republic; London 2012	Succeeded by Chloé Sauvourel
