= Denise Ouabangui =

Central African Republic athlete

Personal information
- Nationality: Central African Republic
- Born: 8 June 1968 (age 58)

Sport
- Sport: Sprinting
- Event: 400 metres

Denise Ouabangui (born 8 June 1968) is a Central African Republic sprinter. She competed in the women's 400 metres at the 1996 Summer Olympics.

Ouabangui was the gold medallist in the 400 m at the 1995 Central African Athletics Championships. She has competed in the sprint events from the 100 m to the 400 m at the 1987 World Championships in Athletics, 1991 World Championships in Athletics, 1993 World Championships in Athletics, and athletics at the 1995 Summer Universiade.

Her son is Arnaud Bingo, professional French handballer. Arnaud said that continuing her mother's legacy running on the track wasn't for him because he doesn't like running for running's sake.
