= Zacharia Maidjida =

Central African middle-distance runner

Personal information
- Nationality: Central African Republic
- Born: 5 June 1969 (age 55); CAR

Sport
- Country: Central African Republic
- Sport: Middle-distance running

Zacharia Maidjida is a Central African Republic Olympic middle-distance runner. He represented his country in the men's 1500 meters and the men's 800 meters at the 1992 Summer Olympics. His times were a 1:50.41 and a 3:55.72.

Olympic Games
Preceded by Mickaël Conjungo	Flagbearer for Central African Republic; 2000 Sydney	Succeeded by Ernest Ndissipou
