= Francky Mbotto =

Central African middle-distance runner

Francky-Edgard Mbotto
Personal information
- Born: 2 September 1997 (age 28) Bangui, Central African Republic
- Height: 1.83 m (6 ft 0 in)

Sport
- Country: Central African Republic
- Sport: Athletics
- Club: UACA (Saint Brieuc)

Francky-Edgard Mbotto (born 2 September 1997 in Bangui) is a Central African middle-distance runner. He competed in the men's 800 metres at the 2016 Summer Olympics and the 2020 Summer Olympics.

== Career ==
In 2015, Mbotto left football to start athletics, thanks to his sport teacher. He met Vincent Ledauphin, his current coach. This meeting had a huge impact on his life. Thanks to his coach, Francky started to train seriously. He ran 400m and quickly became successful at the regional level. In 2016, one year after its athletics debut — the Rio Olympic year - he switched to the 800m and then ran 1.50 seconds while he was a junior. This time enabled him to be contacted by the Central African Republic Athletics Federation to be a part of the delegation of its native country. He made his first national selection during the Olympic Games of Rio at the age of 18 years old. Heat 7, lane 4, he finished last in 1.52.89.

In 2017, He competed in the IAAF World Championship in London. He came sixth in heat-5 against the likes of Pierre-Ambroise Bosse, that year's world champion, Nijel Amos, who was at the time the holder of the fourth fastest 800m time in history, and Adam Kszczot, runner-up world champion that same year.

In 2018, he won the U23 French national outdoor title, but he finished second in the indoor U23 national championship.

In 2019, he was selected as part of the national delegation to run 800m during the 2019 African Games. Unfortunately, he was injured after 400m and was unable to finish the race. This injury caused him to miss the 2019 World Athletics Championships in Doha, Qatar.

Olympic Games
Preceded by Chloé Sauvourel	Flag bearer for Central African Republic; 2020 Tokyo with Chloé Sauvourel	Succeeded by Nadia Guimendego; Terence Tengue
