= Chloé Sauvourel =

Central African swimmer (born 2000)

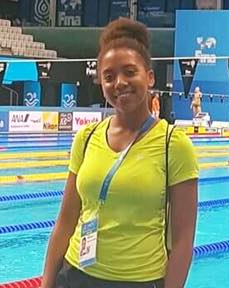
- Sauvourel at the 2017 World Aquatics Championships in Budapest

Personal information
- Full name: Chloé Marie Hélène Sauvourel
- Nationality: French, Central African Republic
- Born: 18 June 2000 (age 26) Nantes, France
- Height: 1.66 m (5 ft 5 in)
- Weight: 68 kg (150 lb)

Sport
- Sport: Swimming
- College team: Florida International University

Chloé Marie Hélène Sauvourel (born 18 June 2000) is a French-born Central African swimmer. She competed at the 2016 Summer Olympics in the women's 50 metre freestyle event; her time of 37.15 seconds in the heats did not qualify her for the semifinals. She was the flagbearer for her country at the Parade of Nations.

== Early life ==
Chloé Marie Hélène Sauvourel was born on 18 June 2000 in Nantes, France, to a French father and a Central African mother.

== Swimming career ==
Sauvourel competed in the women's 50 metre freestyle at the 2015 World Aquatics Championships in Kazan, Tatarstan. She finished seventh in the second heat on 8 August, with a time of 46.55 seconds, which did not qualify her for the following round.

=== Olympics ===
She arrived at the Olympic village on 1 August 2016, while her father stayed elsewhere in the city. Sauvourel was selected as the flagbearer for the Central African Republic's contingent in the parade of nations at the opening ceremony. When asked how she felt, she said it was "something very strong, it was a magical moment! I thank also the Central African trusting me! It was a real pride to wear the colors of my country!"

Sauvorel swam in the second heat on 12 August, finishing sixth in the heat and 85th overall with a time of 37.15 seconds. This was outside of the qualifying time required to reach the following round. She later explained that she felt her prospects were reduced after becoming stressed about competing the day before her swim. She said that she hoped that it was "only the beginning of a beautiful story", as she had reduced her personal best time by seven seconds since the previous championship.

=== World Championships ===
In 2019, she represented Central African Republic at the 2019 World Aquatics Championships in Gwangju, South Korea. She competed in the women's 50 metre freestyle event. She did not advance to compete in the semi-finals. In 2019, she also represented Central African Republic at the 2019 African Games held in Rabat, Morocco. She competed in the women's 50 metre freestyle and women's 100 metre freestyle events.

Olympic Games
Preceded by David Boui	Flagbearer for Central African Republic; 2016 Rio de Janeiro 2020 Tokyo with Francky Mbotto	Succeeded by Nadia Guimendego; Terence Tengue
