= Christian Nassif =

Central African Republic swimmer

Personal information
- Full name: Christian Djidagui Nassif
- Nationality: Central African Republic
- Born: 1 January 1994 (age 32) Bangui, Central African Republic

Sport
- Sport: Swimming
- Strokes: Freestyle

Christian Djidagui Nassif (born 1 January 1994 in Bangui, Central African Republic) is a Central African swimmer specializing in freestyle. He competed in the 50 m event at the 2012 Summer Olympics where he ranked 55th in the heats and did not make it to the semifinals. He also competed in the 50 meter event at the 2013 World Aquatics Championships.
