= Central African Republic Swimming Federation =

CANA
- Founded: 2009
- FINA affiliation: 2009
- CANA affiliation: xxxx
- Website: www.fcn-rca.cabanova.fr
- President: Orphe Perriere

The Central African Republic Swimming Federation (French: Fédération Centrafricaine de Natation), is the national governing body for the sport of swimming in the Central African Republic.
