= Ernest Ndjissipou =

Central African long-distance and marathon runner

Personal information
- Nationality: Central African Republic
- Born: 24 September 1972 (age 54) Bangui, Central African Republic
- Height: 1.83 m (6 ft 0 in)
- Weight: 68 kg (150 lb)

Sport
- Sport: Athletics
- Events: Long-distance running, marathon

Achievements and titles
- Personal bests: 5000 m: 14:24.72 (1993); Marathon: 2:18:06 (2003)

Ernest Ndjissipou (born 24 September 1972, in Bangui) is a retired Central African long-distance and marathon runner. He represented the Central African Republic in three Olympic Games (1992, 1996, and 2004), and has also set both a national record and a personal best of 2:18:06 in men's marathon from the 2003 IAAF World Championships in Paris, France.

== Career ==
Ndjissipou made his official debut as a long-distance runner in the men's 5000 metres at the 1992 Summer Olympics in Barcelona, where he finished twelfth in the last of four preliminary heats with a time of 14:40.12, trailing behind leader Salvatore Antibo of Italy by one minute and ten seconds.

At the 1996 Summer Olympics in Atlanta, Ndjissipou extended his track and field resume by competing in the men's marathon. Though he had never experienced road running in a global stage, Ndjissipou managed to claim a ninety-seventh spot successfully in a vast field of a hundred athletes with a time of 2:35:55.

Eight years after competing in his last Olympics, Ndjissipou qualified for his third Central African team, as a 31-year-old, in the men's marathon at the 2004 Summer Olympics in Athens by receiving a berth from the IAAF World Championships in Paris. He finished the race with a forty-fourth place time in 2:21:23, trailing behind Italian runner and gold medalist Stefano Baldini and Brazil's Vanderlei de Lima (whose race had been grappled and pushed off by Irish protester Cornelius Horan) by an estimation of ten seconds. Building his own milestone as a three-time Olympian, Ndjissipou was appointed by the National Olympic Committee (French: Comité National Olympique et Sportif Centrafricain) to carry the Central African flag in the opening ceremony.

Olympic Games
Preceded by Zacharia Maidjida	Flagbearer for Central African Republic; 2004 Athens	Succeeded by Mireille Derebona
