= Béranger-Aymard Bossé =

Central African athletics competitor

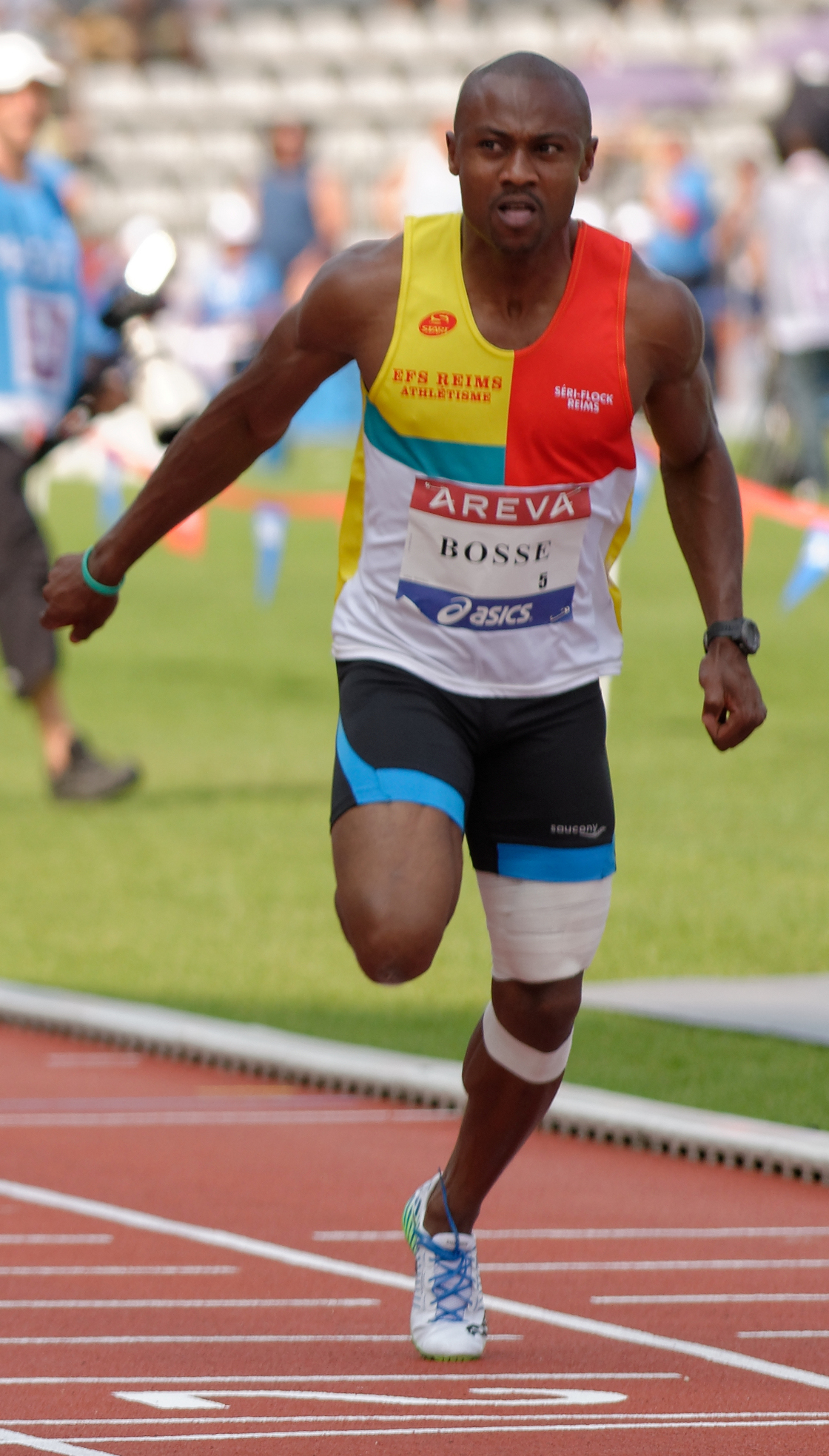
- Bosse at the 2013 French Athletics Championships

Personal information
- Born: 13 March 1985 (age 41) Bangui, Central African Republic

Sport
- Country: Central African Republic
- Sport: Athletics
- Event: 100 metres

Achievements and titles
- Personal best(s): 100 m: 10.38 s 200 m: 21.01 s
- Updated on 4 August 2012

Berenger Aymard Bosse or Aymard Bosse Beranger (born 13 March 1985) is a Central African sprinter who specializes in the 100 metres.

== Career ==
He competed at the 2007 World Championships, the 2008 Olympic Games and the 2012 Olympic Games without progressing to the second round. In Beijing he finished in sixth place in his first round heat in a time of 10.51 seconds. In London he finished in first place in his preliminary round heat in a time of 10.55, however, he finished seventh in his Round 1 heat, again in a time of 10.55.

His personal best time is 10.38 seconds, achieved in April 2007 in Dakar.

In January 2016 he tested positive for an illegal substance, prednisolone, and was banned from competition for three years. His ban lasted from 31 January 2016 to 3 March 2019.
