= Central African National Olympic and Sports Committee =

National Olympic Committee

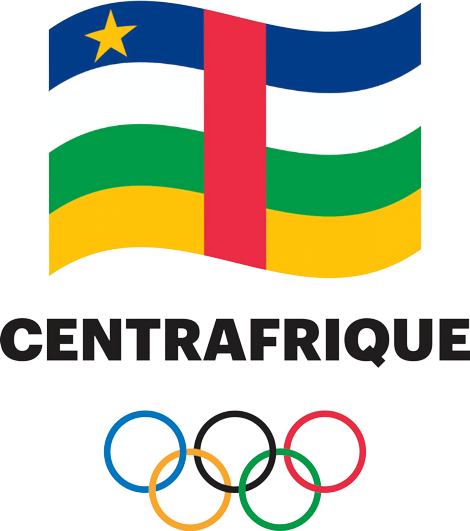
- Country: Central African Republic
- [[|]]
- Code: CAF
- Recognized: 1965
- Continental Association: ANOCA
- Headquarters: Bangui, Central African Republic
- President: Gilles Gilbert Gresenguet
- Secretary General: Guy Armand Beninga Balcilia

The Central African National Olympic and Sports Committee (French: Comité National Olympique et Sportif Centrafricain) (IOC code: CAF) is the National Olympic Committee representing Central African Republic.

== See also ==
- Central African Republic at the Olympics
