= Flag of the Central African Republic =

Central African Republic
- Use: National flag
- Proportion: 2:3
- Adopted: 1 December 1958; 67 years ago
- Design: Four horizontal stripes of blue, white, green, and yellow, intersected by one vertical stripe of red in the middle; with a yellow five-pointed star in the canton.
- Designed by: Barthélemy Boganda

The flag of the Central African Republic (French: Drapeau de la République centrafricaine; Sango: Bendêre tî Bêafrîka) was officially adopted in 1958. It has been retained since that time with the same design, four horizontal stripes of blue, white, green and yellow, and a single vertical band of red, with a yellow five-pointed star in the upper left corner.

== Design ==
The design consists of four horizontal stripes and one vertical stripe, and a single yellow five-pointed star in the upper left. The colours chosen are intended to be symbolic of France (blue and white) and Africa (green and yellow) with the red vertical stripe connecting them both in unity, and the respect that Europeans and Africans should have for each other.

In addition, the blue represents the sky and freedom, the white symbolizes peace and dignity; the green represents hope and faith, the yellow color stands for tolerance and the red represents the blood of humanity. The star of independence represents the aspirations of the country towards a vibrant future as well as a symbol of African unity, progress and tolerance.

The Constitution of the Central African Republic describes the flag as "four equal sized horizontal bands of the colours blue, white, green and yellow, perpendicularly barred in their centre by a red band of equal size and marked in the upper left corner by a yellow five-pointed star."

== Construction sheets ==
ratio 2:3

ratio 3:5

== Colour scheme ==
| | Blue | White | Green | Yellow | Red |
|---|---|---|---|---|---|
| RGB | 0/48/130 | 255/255/255 | 40/151/40 | 255/206/0 | 210/16/52 |
| Hexadecimal | #003082 | #FFFFFF | #289728 | #ffce00 | #d21034 |
| CMYK | 100/63/0/49 | 0/0/0/0 | 74/0/74/41 | 0/19/100/0 | 0/92/75/18 |
| Pantone | 287 C | White | 7739 C | Yellow C | 186 C |

== History ==
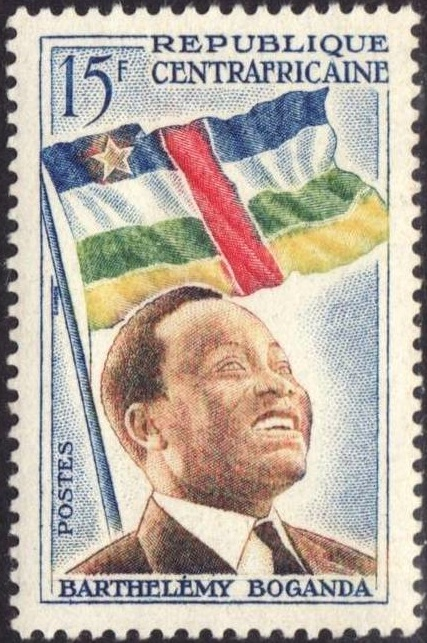
Central African Republic's first postage stamp, from 1959, features Boganda flanked by his flag design.

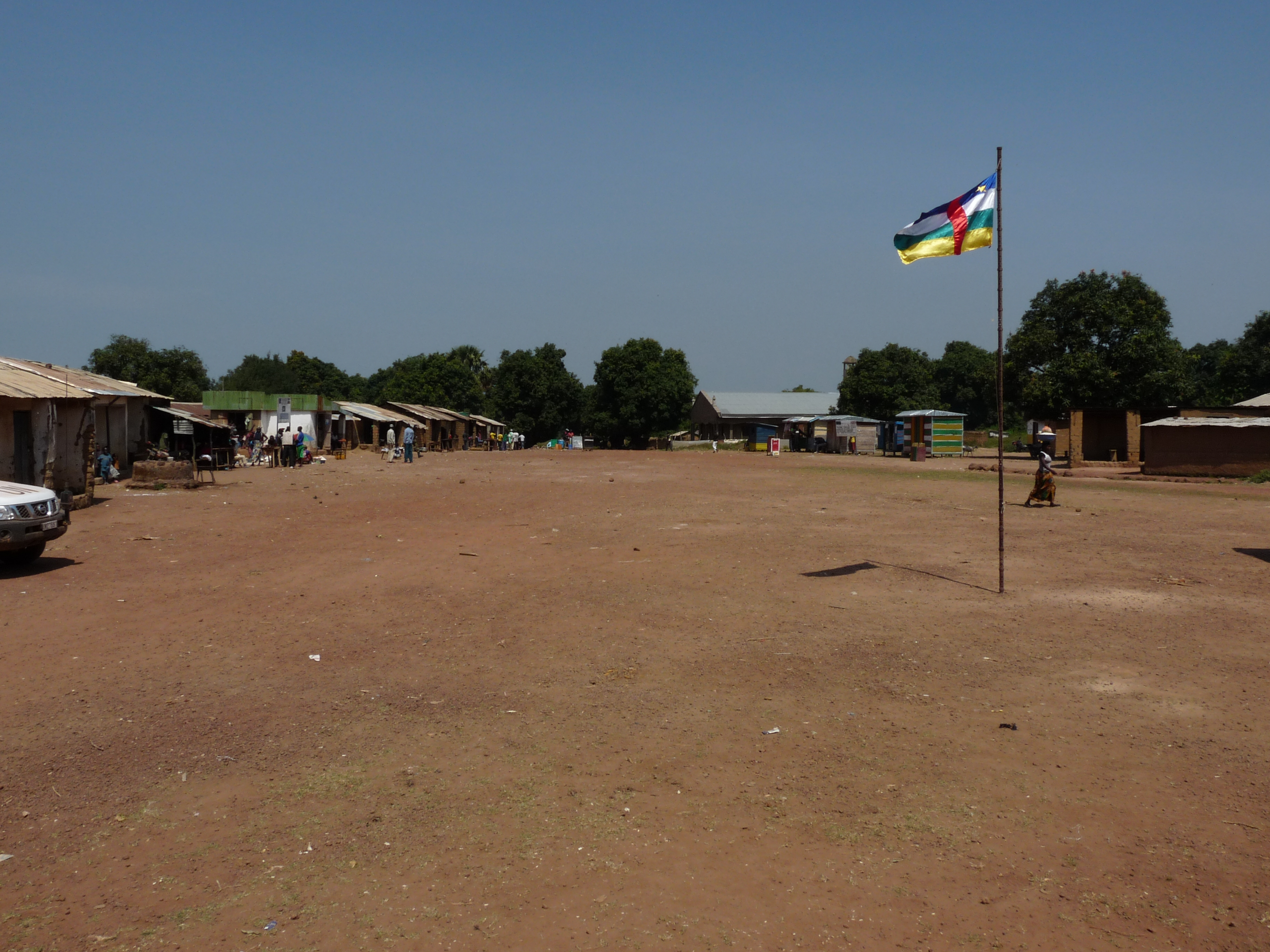
CAR flag in Niem Yéléwa, Nana-Mambéré prefecture

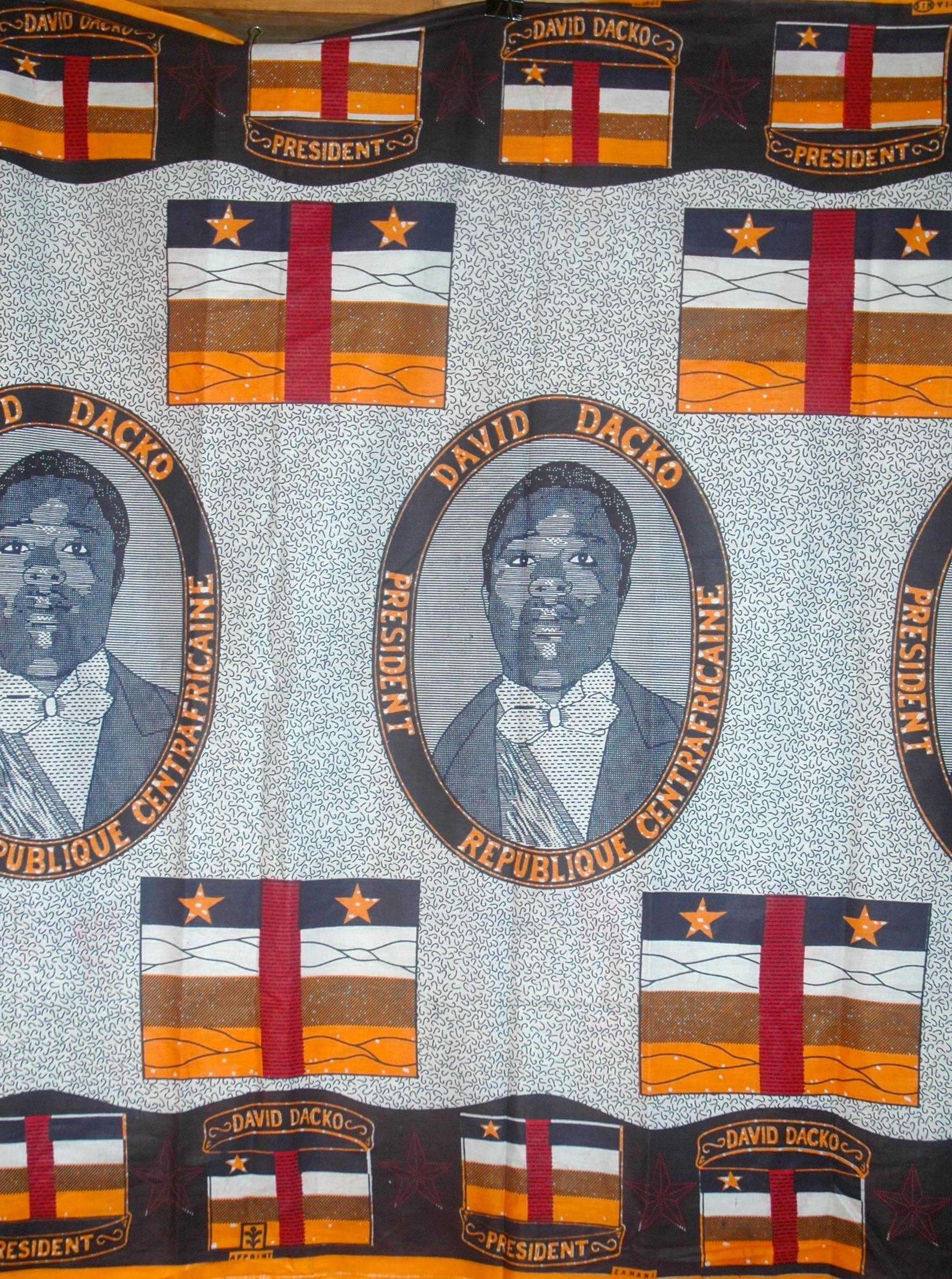
President David Dacko and CAR flags on a carpet; the flag is depicted incorrectly with two stars instead of one.

The flag of the Central African Republic was designed by Barthélemy Boganda, who would become its first prime minister. It was originally intended to be the flag of the United States of Latin Africa, which he proposed in 1957. The flag was adopted by the Legislative Assembly of Ubangi-Shari on 1 December 1958. At the time it was introduced, Boganda stated in the national Legislative Assembly that "Those colours, which symbolize the four territories constituting the French Equatorial Africa but also our guide territory, the Metropolitan France, came out of my heart. The red stripe which crosses the four colours is the symbol of our blood. As we did it when France was in danger, we shall shed our blood for Africa and to protect the Central African Republic, member of the French Community."

President Jean-Bédel Bokassa considered the replacement of the flag in 1976, following his conversion to Islam under the influence of Libyan leader Muammar Gaddafi. The proposal was to change the flag entirely in order to feature a crescent and star prominently. However, the proposal was short-lived, as several months later the Central African Empire was created under Bokassa, as Emperor Bokassa I. On 4 December that year, a Constitution described both the emblem for the Emperor's personal use and the existing flag was re-used as that of the Empire. The personal standard of the Emperor was light green in color, with a gold-colored eagle in the centre superimposed over a 20-pointed gold star, inspired by the eagle on the imperial standard of Napoleon I.

The flag remained in place after the Central African Empire fell.

== Former flags ==
Flag of France, used during colonial Ubangi-Shari from 1903 until 1960

Proposed replacement flag for the Central African Republic from 1976

Imperial standard of Bokassa I, used as a co-flag of the Central African Empire from 1976 until 1979

== See also ==
- Flag of Mauritius
- Flag of Seychelles
