= 2025 World Para Archery Championships – Men's individual recurve open =

Men's individual recurve open at the 2025 World Para Archery Championships
- Venue: Gwangju International Archery Center
- Location: Gwangju, South Korea
- Dates: 23–28 September

The men's individual recurve open competition at the 2025 World Para Archery Championships, which will take place from 23 to 28 September 2025 in Gwangju, South Korea. Kevin Mather is the defending champion.

== Schedule ==
All times are in Korea Standard Time (UTC+09:00).

| Date | Time | Round |
|---|---|---|
| Tuesday, 22 September | | Official practice |
| Wednesday, 23 September | 09:00 12:35 | Qualification round Elimination Round; First Round (1/48) |
| Friday, 25 September | 09:15; 10:10; 10:45 11:20; 11:55 | Elimination Round; Second round (1/24); Third Round (1/16); Fourth round (1/8); Final Round; Quarter-finals; Semi-finals |
| Saturday, 26 September | 17:02; 17:17 | Final Round; Bronze-medal match Gold-medal match |

== Qualification Round ==
| Rank | World | Name | Nation | Score | 10+X | X |
|---|---|---|---|---|---|---|
| 1 | 9 | Zhao Lixue | China | 658 | 23 | 7 |
| 2 | 15 | Gan Jun | China | 651 | 20 | 4 |
| 3 | 8 | Kholidin | Indonesia | 649 | 20 | 11 |
| 4 | 1 | Harvinder Singh | India | 645 | 27 | 9 |
| 5 | — | Kirill Smirnov | AIN | 644 | 22 | 6 |
| 6 | 6 | Guillaume Toucoullet | France | 642 | 25 | 6 |
| 7 | 16 | Stefano Travisani | Italy | 642 | 23 | 12 |
| 8 | 18 | Suresh Selvathamby | Malaysia | 642 | 21 | 7 |
| 9 | 13 | Tseng Lung-hui | Chinese Taipei | 640 | 18 | 9 |
| 10 | — | Sergey Khutakov | AIN | 640 | 18 | 5 |
| 11 | 5 | Héctor Ramírez | Colombia | 639 | 21 | 6 |
| 12 | — | Yun Duo | China | 639 | 10 | 1 |
| 13 | 22 | Gholamreza Rahimi | Iran | 637 | 18 | 7 |
| 14 | 20 | Sahil | India | 633 | 16 | 6 |
| 15 | 34 | Kim Jung-hoon | South Korea | 633 | 14 | 7 |
| 16 | 2 | Samuel Molina | Mexico | 632 | 21 | 11 |
| 17 | 43 | Bettoni Davide | Italy | 631 | 18 | 6 |
| 18 | 38 | Sadık Savaş | Turkey | 631 | 15 | 8 |
| 19 | 4 | Hanreuchai Netsiri | Thailand | 629 | 15 | 3 |
| 20 | 56 | Munkhbaatar Namjilmaa | Mongolia | 627 | 17 | 4 |
| 21 | — | Anton Ziapaev | AIN | 626 | 14 | 3 |
| 22 | 23 | Lee Ji-hoon | South Korea | 625 | 22 | 8 |
| 23 | 113 | Janis Kants | Latvia | 623 | 16 | 4 |
| 24 | 30 | David Ivan | Slovakia | 622 | 18 | 8 |
| 25 | 12 | Taymon Kenton-Smith | Australia | 622 | 15 | 3 |
| 26 | 70 | Thomas Holland | Australia | 621 | 19 | 5 |
| 27 | 93 | Denis Ivan | Slovakia | 620 | 16 | 6 |
| 28 | 10 | Cameron Radigan | United Kingdom | 620 | 14 | 4 |
| 29 | 24 | Setiawan | Indonesia | 619 | 22 | 6 |
| 30 | 14 | Dhanna Ram Godara | India | 617 | 15 | 4 |
| 31 | 98 | Stuart Hume | Australia | 614 | 16 | 5 |
| 32 | 7 | Kwak Geon-hwi | South Korea | 610 | 13 | 2 |
| 33 | 31 | Dejan Fabcic | Slovakia | 610 | 12 | 2 |
| 34 | 3 | Łukasz Ciszek | Poland | 603 | 9 | 3 |
| 35 | 45 | Al Amin Hossain | Bangladesh | 601 | 16 | 3 |
| 36 | 36 | Vasyl Naumchuk | Ukraine | 598 | 10 | 4 |
| 37 | 56 | Li Bing-yu | Chinese Taipei | 597 | 14 | 3 |
| 38 | 11 | Juan Diego Blas Fernández | Guatemala | 597 | 9 | 5 |
| 39 | 45 | Pinheiro da Silva Thiago | Brazil | 596 | 12 | 3 |
| 40 | 50 | Pornchai Phimthong | Thailand | 589 | 15 | 5 |
| 41 | 25 | Jordan White | United States | 587 | 7 | 4 |
| 42 | 26 | Ueyama Tomohiro | Japan | 586 | 14 | 1 |
| 43 | 70 | Marcin Molik | Poland | 584 | 13 | 2 |
| 44 | 32 | Munkhbaatar Purevsed | Mongolia | 583 | 10 | 4 |
| 45 | 39 | Vaclav Kostal | Czech Republic | 579 | 10 | 2 |
| 46 | 28 | Jean-François Lavergne | Canada | 577 | 7 | 1 |
| 47 | 98 | Liadushchenkov Viktor | Ukraine | 574 | 3 | 1 |
| 48 | 113 | Otsuka Tadatsugu | Japan | 564 | 5 | 1 |
| 49 | 51 | Romero Lagunas Cirilo | Mexico | 561 | 7 | 2 |
| 50 | 63 | Giorgi Managadze | Georgia | 559 | 8 | 1 |
| 51 | 63 | Juansheri Jinjikhadze | Georgia | 559 | 7 | 3 |
| 52 | 37 | Ruslan Tsymbaliuk | Ukraine | 556 | 4 | 3 |
| 53 | 19 | Mohammad Reza Arab Ameri | Iran | 555 | 2 | 1 |
| 54 | 66 | Batkhuyag Purevtseren | Mongolia | 554 | 5 | 1 |
| 55 | 70 | Gints Jonasts | Latvia | 544 | 2 | 0 |
| 56 | 126 | Alptekin Koprulu | Turkey | 538 | 8 | 2 |
| 57 | 74 | Zhassulan Kishen | Kazakhstan | 528 | 6 | 1 |

== Elimination round ==
(+) Won the shoot-off by arrow closer to the center of the target.

=== Section 1 ===
1/48 Final

1/32 Final
33 | (Slovakia) D Fabčič | 1 | 26 | 27 | 24 | 26
32 | (South Korea) Kwak G-h | 7 | 29 | 27 | 26 | 27
17 | (Italy) B Davide | 6 | 27 | 27 | 24 | 24
48 | (Japan) Otsuka T | 2 | 25 | 25 | 24 | 24
49 | (Mexico) C Romelo Lagunas | 0 | 23 | 23 | 25
16 | (Mexico) S Molina | 6 | 29 | 29 | 27

1/16 Final
1 | (China) Zhao LX | 0 | 27 | 25 | 27
32 | (South Korea) Kwak G-h | 6 | 28 | 28 | 28
17 | (Italy) B Davide | 5^{8} | 25 | 26 | 28 | 25 | 28
16 | (Mexico) S Molina | 6^{9} | 27 | 25 | 28 | 28 | 25

1/8 Final
32 | (South Korea) Kwak G-h | 5^{9} | 28 | 30 | 27 | 25 | 27
16 | (Mexico) S Molina | 6^{10} | 28 | 24 | 24 | 27 | 28

=== Section 2 ===
1/48 final
57 | (Kazakhstan) Zhassulan Kishen | 6 | 22 | 23 | 28
56 | (Turkey) Alptekin Koprulu | 0 | 18 | 22 | 26

1/32 final
9 | (Chinese Taipei) Tseng Lung-hui
57 | (Kazakhstan) Zhassulan Kishen
41 | (United States) Jordan White
24 | (Slovakia) David Ivan
25 | (Australia) Taymon Kenton-Smith
40 | (Thailand) Pornchai Phimthong

1/16 final
8 | (Malaysia) Suresh Selvathamby

1/8 final

=== Section 3 ===
1/48 Final

1/32 Final
37 | (Chinese Taipei) Li Bing-yu
28 | (United Kingdom) Cameron Radigan
21 | (Individual Neutral Athletes) Anton Ziapaev
44 | (Mongolia) Munkhbaatar Purevsed
53 | (Iran) Mohammad Reza Arab Ameri
12 | (China) Yun Duo

1/16 Final
5 | (Individual Neutral Athletes) Kirill Smirnov

1/8 Final

=== Section 4 ===
1/48 Final

1/32 Final
13 | (Iran) Gholamreza Rahimi
52 | (Ukraine) Ruslan Tsymbaliuk
45 | (Czech Republic) Vaclav Kostal
20 | (Mongolia) Munkhbaatar Namjilmaa
29 | (Indonesia) Setiawan
36 | (Ukraine) Vasyl Naumchuk

1/16 Final
4 | (India) Harvinder Singh

1/8 Final

=== Section 5 ===
First Round

Second Round
35 | (Bangladesh) Al Amin Hossain
30 | (India) Dhanna Ram Godara
19 | (Thailand) Hanreuchai Netsiri
46 | (Canada) Jean-François Lavergne
51 | (Georgia (country)) Juansheri Jinjikhadze
14 | (India) Sahil

Third Round
3 | (Indonesia) Kholidin

Fourth Round

=== Section 6 ===
First Round

Second Round
11 | (Colombia) Héctor Ramírez
54 | (Mongolia) Batkhuyag Purevtseren
43 | (Poland) Marcin Molik
22 | (South Korea) Lee Ji-hoon
27 | (Slovakia) Denis Ivan
38 | (Guatemala) Juan Diego Blas Fernández

Third Round
6 | (France) Guillaume Toucoullet

Fourth Round

=== Section 7 ===
First Round

Second Round
39 | (Brazil) Pinheiro da Silva Thiago
26 | (Australia) Thomas Holland
23 | (Latvia) Janis Kants
42 | (Japan) Ueyama Tomohiro
55 | (Latvia) Gints Jonasts
10 | (Individual Neutral Athletes) Sergey Khutakov

Third Round
7 | (Italy) Stefano Travisani

Fourth Round

=== Section 8 ===
1/48 Final

1/32 Final
15 | (South Korea) Kim Jung-hoon
50 | (Georgia (country)) Giorgi Managadze
47 | (Ukraine) Liadushchenkov Viktor
18 | (Turkey) Sadık Savaş
31 | (Australia) Stuart Hume
34 | (Poland) Łukasz Ciszek

1/16 Final
2 | (China) Gan Jun

1/8 Final
