= Archery at the 2020 Summer Paralympics – Team recurve open =

Mixed team recurve open at the XVI Paralympic Games
- Paralympic archery
- Venue: Yumenoshima Park Archery Field
- Dates: 27 August 2021 (ranking round); 4 September 2021 (match play)
- Competitors: 28 from 14 nations
- Teams: 14

Medalists
1st place, gold medalist(s)		Margarita Sidorenko; Kirill Smirnov	RPC
2nd place, silver medalist(s)		Elisabetta Mijno; Stefano Travisani	Italy
3rd place, bronze medalist(s)		Wu Chunyan; Zhao Lixue	China

The Mixed team recurve open event is one of three team events to be held in Archery at the 2020 Summer Paralympics in Tokyo. It contained fourteen teams of one man and one woman.

Following a ranking round, twelve of the fourteen teams entered. the knockout rounds at the first round stages, with the top two progressing directly to the quarterfinals. The losing semifinalists play off for the bronze medal.

== Ranking round ==
The ranking round was held on 27 August.

Rank	Nation	Gender	Archer	Individual total	Team total
1	China	F	Wu Chunyan	642	1281 PR
1	China	M	Zhao Lixue	639	1281 PR
2	Iran	F	Zahra Nemati	630	1274
2	Iran	M	Gholamreza Rahimi	644	1274
3	Italy	F	Elisabetta Mijno	633	1242
3	Italy	M	Stefano Travisani	609	1242
4	RPC	F	Margarita Sidorenko	605	1237
4	RPC	M	Kirill Smirnov	632	1237
5	Thailand	F	Phattharaphon Pattawaeo	599	1231
5	Thailand	M	Hanreuchai Netsiri	632	1231
6	Japan	F	Chika Shigesada	584	1193
6	Japan	M	Tomohiro Ueyama	609	1193
7	Turkey	F	Yağmur Şengül	557	1168
7	Turkey	M	Sadık Savaş	611	1168
8	Australia	F	Imalia Oktrininda	564	1168
8	Australia	M	Taymon Kenton-Smith	604	1168
9	Poland	F	Milena Olszewska	581	1166
9	Poland	M	Łukasz Ciszek	585	1166
10	Great Britain	F	Hazel Chaisty	571	1153
10	Great Britain	M	David Phillips	582	1153
11	Brazil	F	Fabíola Dergovics	572	1153
11	Brazil	M	Heriberto Alves Roccno	581	1153
12	South Korea	F	Jo Jang-moon	505	1133
12	South Korea	M	Kim Min-su	628	1133
13	United States	F	Emma Rose Ravish	492	1100
13	United States	M	Eric Bennett	608	1100
14	Mongolia	F	Dembereliin Selengee	461	870
14	Mongolia	M	Namjilmaagiin Mönkhbaatar	409	870

== Elimination round ==
Round of 16
9	Milena Olszewska (POL); Łukasz Ciszek (POL)	6	34	31	36
8	Imalia Oktrininda (AUS); Taymon Kenton-Smith (AUS)	0	32	30	32
5	Phattharaphon Pattawaeo (THA); Hanreuchai Netsiri (THA)	4	34	36	31	30	16
12	Jo Jang-moon (KOR); Kim Min-su (KOR)	5	31	33	34	33	19
13	Emma Rose Ravish (USA); Eric Bennett (USA)	2	36	34	31	31
4	Margarita Sidorenko (RPC); Kirill Smirnov (RPC)	6	34	37	33	32
3	Elisabetta Mijno (ITA); Stefano Travisani (ITA)	6	27	32	33
14	Dembereliin Selengee (MGL); Namjilmaagiin Mönkhbaatar (MGL)	0	25	25	32
11	Fabíola Dergovics (BRA); Heriberto Alves Rocco (BRA)	1	34	24	33
6	Chika Shigesada (JPN); Tomohiro Ueyama (JPN)	5	34	34	35
7	Yağmur Şengül (TUR); Sadık Savaş (TUR)	1	30	33	35
10	Hazel Chaisty (GBR); David Phillips (GBR)	5	32	33	37

Quarterfinals
1	Wu Chunyan (CHN); Zhao Lixue (CHN)	6	34	34	33
9	Milena Olszewska (POL); Łukasz Ciszek (POL)	0	33	31	30
12	Jo Jang-moon (KOR); Kim Min-su (KOR)	2	29	33	29	30
4	Margarita Sidorenko (RPC); Kirill Smirnov (RPC)	6	28	34	34	37
3	Elisabetta Mijno (ITA); Stefano Travisani (ITA)	6	32	35	36	34
6	Chika Shigesada (JPN); Tomohiro Ueyama (JPN)	2	34	33	32	31
10	Hazel Chaisty (GBR); David Phillips (GBR)	0	32	28	27
2	Zahra Nemati (IRI); Gholamreza Rahimi (IRI)	6	35	30	35

Semifinals
1	Wu Chunyan (CHN); Zhao Lixue (CHN)	4	31	33	35	33	16
4	Margarita Sidorenko (RPC); Kirill Smirnov (RPC)	5	36	36	31	28	19
3	Elisabetta Mijno (ITA); Stefano Travisani (ITA)	5	32	33	33	37
2	Zahra Nemati (IRI); Gholamreza Rahimi (IRI)	3	34	31	27	37

Gold medal match
4	Margarita Sidorenko (RPC); Kirill Smirnov (RPC)	5	36	30	31	35	18
3	Elisabetta Mijno (ITA); Stefano Travisani (ITA)	4	34	33	32	33	17
Bronze medal match
1	Wu Chunyan (CHN); Zhao Lixue (CHN)	6	30	35	36	37
2	Zahra Nemati (IRI); Gholamreza Rahimi (IRI)	2	33	31	34	34
