= Archery at the 2020 Summer Paralympics – Men's individual recurve open =

Archery, Men's recurve open at the XVI Paralympic Games
- Venue: Yumenoshima Park Archery Field
- Dates: 27 August – 3 September 2021
- Competitors: 31 from 25 nations

Medalists
1st place, gold medalist(s)		Kevin Mather	United States
2nd place, silver medalist(s)		Zhao Lixue	China
3rd place, bronze medalist(s)		Harvinder Singh	India

The men's individual recurve open archery discipline at the 2020 Summer Paralympics was contested from 27 August to 3 September.

In the ranking rounds each archer shoots 72 arrows, and is seeded according to score. In the knock-out stages each archer shoots three arrows per set against an opponent, the scores being aggregated. Losing semifinalists compete in a bronze medal match. As the field contained 31 archers, the single highest-ranked archer in the ranking round, will progress directly to the round of 16 places.

== Ranking round ==
The ranking round of the men's individual recurve event was held on 27 August.

Rank	Archer	Nation	10s	Xs	Score	Notes
1	Gholamreza Rahimi	Iran	23	7	644	PR
2	Zhao Lixue	China	20	10	639	
3	Kirill Smirnov	RPC	18	9	632	
4	Hanreuchai Netsiri	Thailand	8	3	632	SB
5	Bato Tsydendorzhiev	RPC	18	4	630	
6	Kim Min-su	South Korea	15	3	628	
7	Guillaume Toucoullet	France	13	3	620	
8	Anton Ziapaev	RPC	13	6	612	
9	Sadık Savaş	Turkey	19	6	611	
10	Chikara Vivek	India	20	2	609	SB
11	Tomohiro Ueyama	Japan	16	5	609	
12	Stefano Travisani	Italy	14	4	609	SB
13	Samuel Molina	Mexico	10	3	609	
14	Dávid Ivan	Slovakia	10	1	609	
15	Eric Bennett	United States	19	7	608	
16	Eugen Patru	Romania	16	4	608	
17	Kevin Mather	United States	13	7	606	
18	Taymon Kenton-Smith	Australia	9	1	604	
19	Wang Sijun	China	7	1	604	
20	Dejan Fabčič	Slovenia	18	3	603	
21	Harvinder Singh	India	14	6	600	
22	Václav Košťál	Czech Republic	8	2	590	SB
23	Sampath Megahamulea	Sri Lanka	13	6	589	
24	Łukasz Ciszek	Poland	14	4	585	
25	Vedat Aksoy	Turkey	10	3	583	
26	David Phillips	Great Britain	7	3	582	
27	Heriberto Alves Rocca	Brazil	11	3	581	
28	Suresh Selvathamby	Malaysia	10	5	579	SB
29	Maik Szarszewski	Germany	10	2	569	
30	Pema Rigsel	Bhutan	7	2	523	
31	Namjilmaagiin Mönkhbaatar	Mongolia	3	3	409	

== Knockout rounds ==
The knockout rounds will be held on 3 September 2021.

=== Top half ===
Round of 32
17	Mather (USA)	7	26	29	27	26	28
16	Patru (ROU)	3	25	24	27	27	27
9	Savaş (TUR)	6	21	26	22	26	29
24	Ciszek (POL)	4	22	24	23	24	22
25	Aksoy (TUR)	6	19	26	26	27
8	Ziapaev (RPC)	2	24	24	25	22
5	Tsydendorzhiev (RPC)	6	25	24	25	28
28	Selvathamby (MAS)	2	23	28	23	23
21	Singh (IND)	6 ^{10}	27	26	26	25	25
12	Travisani (ITA)	5 ^{7}	24	22	27	25	27
13	Molina (MEX)	0	23	22	23
20	Fabčič (SLO)	6	25	28	28
29	Szarszewski (GER)	6	21	24	25	22
4	Netsiri (THA)	2	24	22	22	21

Round of 16
1	Rahimi (IRI)	5 ^{9}	22	26	27	25	26
17	Mather (USA)	6 ^{10}	23	29	24	23	26
9	Savaş (TUR)	6	25	23	24	26	26
25	Aksoy (TUR)	4	22	24	26	24	22
5	Tsydendorzhiev (RPC)	5 ^{7}	28	28	26	21	28
21	Singh (IND)	6 ^{8}	26	23	29	23	28
20	Fabčič (SLO)	0	23	27	24
29	Szarszewski (GER)	6	27	28	27

Quarterfinals
17	Mather (USA)	6	28	27	29	26
9	Savaş (TUR)	2	23	27	28	26
21	Singh (IND)	6	25	28	25	26
29	Szarszewski (GER)	2	21	23	28	23

Semifinals
17	Mather (USA)	6	28	24	25	24	26
21	Singh (IND)	4	25	24	25	25	24

=== Bottom half ===
Round of 32
3	Smirnov (RPC)	6	25	28	21	27
30	Rigsel (BHU)	2	23	23	22	18
19	Wang (CHN)	2	27	23	21	22
14	Ivan (SVK)	6	24	26	27	24
11	Ueyama (JPN)	0	21	21	18
22	Košťál (CZE)	6	25	24	27
27	Alves Rocca (BRA)	4	25	17	23	27	23
6	Kim (KOR)	6	20	22	24	24	30
7	Toucoullet (FRA)	2	24	25	25	26
26	Phillips (GBR)	6	26	24	27	28
23	Megahamulea (SRI)	2	22	25	21	21
10	Vivek (IND)	6	25	24	25	25
15	Bennett (USA)	6	27	29	23	24	28
18	Kenton-Smith (AUS)	4	25	24	24	25	24
31	N. Mönkhbaatar (MGL)	0	16	20	20
2	Zhao (CHN)	6	27	24	23

Round of 16
3	Smirnov (RPC)	6	28	28	26
14	Ivan (SVK)	0	22	21	18
22	Košťál (CZE)	2	23	25	19	18
6	Kim (KOR)	6	28	22	27	25
26	Phillips (GBR)	7	27	25	22	29	23
10	Vivek (IND)	3	25	25	28	22	17
15	Bennett (USA)	4	25	25	26	29	21
2	Zhao (CHN)	6	26	25	26	27	25

Quarterfinals
3	Smirnov (RPC)	4	27	29	27	27	27
6	Kim (KOR)	6	30	27	26	28	28
26	Phillips (GBR)	2	26	27	18	22
2	Zhao (CHN)	6	27	26	27	26

Semifinals
6	Kim (KOR)	5 ^{8}	26	30	25	25	23
2	Zhao (CHN)	6 ^{10}	25	27	25	26	25

=== Finals ===
Gold medal match
17	Mather (USA)	6	25	23	25	24	28
2	Zhao (CHN)	4	24	19	25	27	28
Bronze medal match
21	Singh (IND)	6 ^{10}	26	27	28	25	26
8	Kim (KOR)	5 ^{8}	24	29	25	25	27
