= Archery at the 2020 Summer Paralympics =

Archery at the XVI Paralympic Games
- Archery pictogram of the 2020 Summer Paralympics
- Venue: Dream Island Archery Park
- Dates: 27 August – 4 September 2021
- Competitors: 140 in 9 events from 42 nations

Archery at the 2020 Summer Paralympics was held at Dream Island Archery Park in Tokyo Bay Zone It consisted of 9 events (3 men, 3 women, 3 mixed teams). It was expected that there would be 140 archer slots in the qualifying rounds to the countdown of the Games.

The 2020 Summer Olympic and Paralympic Games were postponed to 2021 due to the COVID-19 pandemic. They kept the 2020 name and were held from 24 August to 5 September 2021.

== Competition schedule ==
Legend
| RR | Ranking Round | R2 | Round of 32 | R3 | Round of 16 | QF | Quarter-finals | F | Semi-finals, Bronze medal & Gold medal |

M = Morning session.
E = Evening session.

Schedule
| Date → | Aug 27 | | Aug 28 | | | | Aug 29 | | Aug 30 | | | | Aug 31 | | | Sep 1 | | | Sep 2 | | | Sep 3 | | | Sep 4 | |
| Event ↓ | M | E | M | | E | | M | E | M | | E | | M | | E | M | | E | M | | E | M | E | | | |
|---|---|---|---|---|---|---|---|---|---|---|---|---|---|---|---|---|---|---|---|---|---|---|---|---|---|---|
| Men's individual recurve | | RR | | | | | | | | | | | | | | | | | | | | R3 | QF | F | | |
| Women's individual recurve | RR | | | | | | | | | | | | | | | | | | R3 | QF | F | | | | | |
| Mixed team recurve | | | | | | | | | | | | | | | | | | | | | | | | | QF | F |
| Men's individual W1 | RR | | | | | | | | | | QF | F | | | | | | | | | | | | | | |
| Women's individual W1 | RR | | | | | | | | | | | | | | | QF | F | | | | | | | | | |
| Mixed team W1 | | | | | QF | F | | | | | | | | | | | | | | | | | | | | |
| Men's individual compound open | | RR | R2 | R3 | | | | | | | | | QF | F | | | | | | | | | | | | |
| Women's individual compound open | RR | | | | | | R3 | | QF | F | | | | | | | | | | | | | | | | |
| Mixed team compound | | | | | | | QF | F | | | | | | | | | | | | | | | | | | |

== Participating nations ==
As of 24 August 2021

- Australia (4)
- Belgium (1)
- Bhutan (1)
- Brazil (6)
- Canada (1)
- Chile (1)
- China (13)
- Colombia (1)
- Costa Rica (1)
- Czech Republic (4)
- Finland (1)
- France (4)
- Germany (1)
- Great Britain (7)
- Greece (1)
- Hong Kong (1)
- Hungary (1)
- India (5)
- Iran (6)
- Iraq (2)
- Ireland (1)
- Italy (8)
- Japan (6) (Host country)
- Latvia (1)
- Malaysia (2)
- Mexico (1)
- Mongolia (2)
- Poland (2)
- Romania (1)
- RPC (11)
- Singapore (1)
- Slovakia (3)
- Slovenia (1)
- South Africa (2)
- South Korea (6)
- Spain (1)
- Sri Lanka (1)
- Sweden (1)
- Thailand (5)
- Turkey (11)
- Ukraine (2)
- United States (7)

== Events ==
There were 140 archers (80 men and 60 women) competing in 9 medal events.

== Medal summary ==
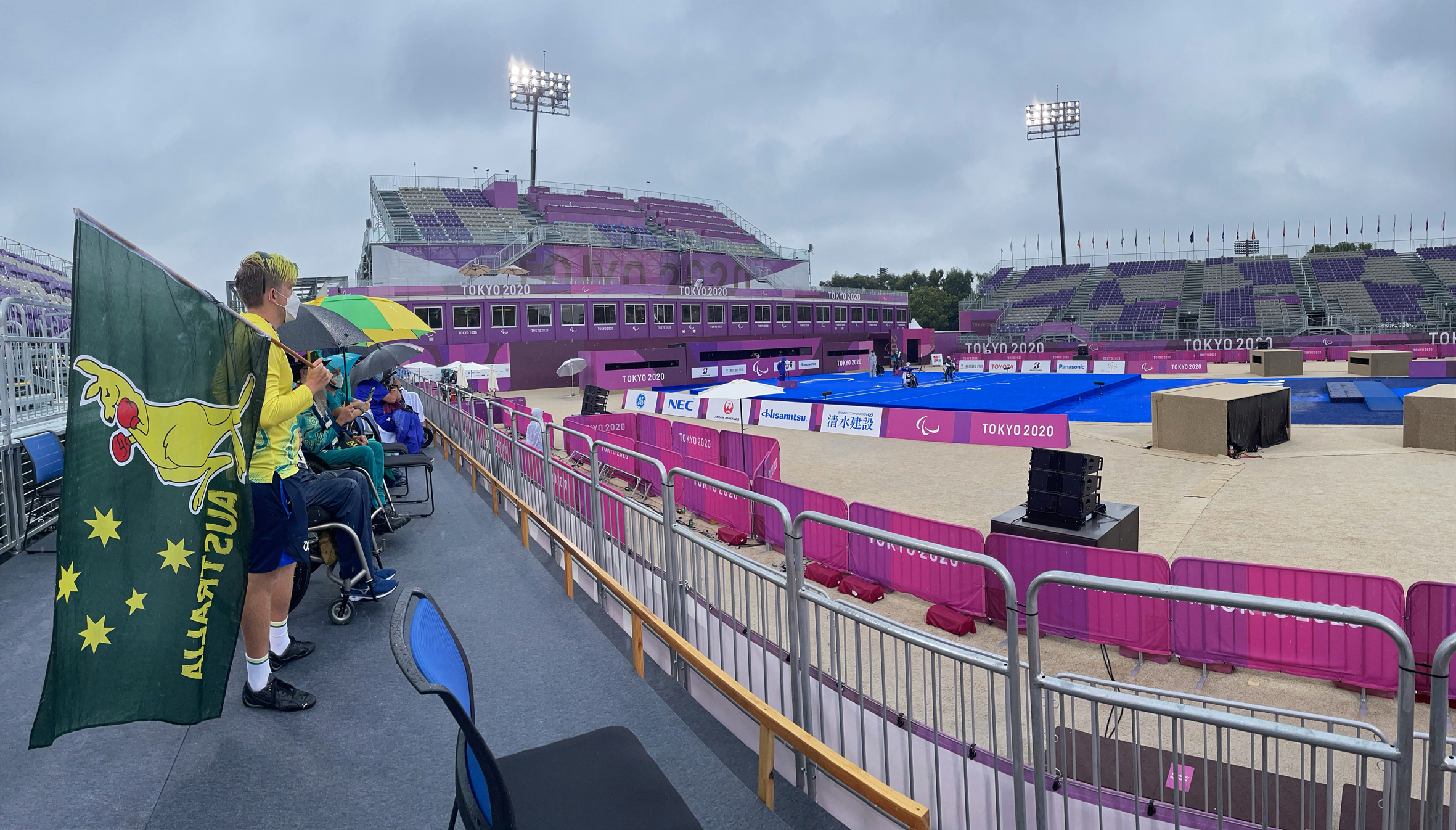
Members of the Australian archery team support a teammate during competition at the Tokyo 2020 Paralympics

=== Medal table ===
| Rank | NPC | Gold | Silver | Bronze | Total |
|---|---|---|---|---|---|
| 1 | China | 4 | 1 | 3 | 8 |
| 2 | Czech Republic | 1 | 2 | 0 | 3 |
| 3 | Iran | 1 | 1 | 0 | 2 |
| 4 | RPC | 1 | 0 | 2 | 3 |
| 5 | Great Britain | 1 | 0 | 1 | 2 |
| 6 | United States | 1 | 0 | 0 | 1 |
| 7 | Italy | 0 | 2 | 1 | 3 |
| 7 | Turkey | 0 | 2 | 1 | 3 |
| 9 | Chile | 0 | 1 | 0 | 1 |
| 10 | India | 0 | 0 | 1 | 1 |
| Totals (10 entries) | | 9 | 9 | 9 | 27 |

=== Medalists ===
| Event | Class | Gold | Silver | Bronze |
|---|---|---|---|---|
| Men's individual | W1 | David Drahonínský; Czech Republic | Nihat Türkmenoğlu; Turkey | Bahattin Hekimoğlu; Turkey |
| Men's individual compound | Open | He Zihao; China | Ramezan Biabani; Iran | Ai Xinliang; China |
| Men's individual recurve | Open | Kevin Mather; United States | Zhao Lixue; China | Harvinder Singh; India |
| Women's individual | W1 | Chen Minyi; China | Šárka Musilová; Czech Republic | Victoria Rumary; Great Britain |
| Women's individual compound | Open | Phoebe Paterson Pine; Great Britain | Mariana Zúñiga; Chile | Maria Andrea Virgilio; Italy |
| Women's individual recurve | Open | Zahra Nemati; Iran | Vincenza Petrilli; Italy | Wu Chunyan; China |
| Mixed team | W1 | China; Chen Minyi; Zhang Tianxin | Czech Republic; David Drahonínský; Šárka Musilová | RPC; Elena Krutova; Aleksei Leonov |
| Mixed team compound | Open | China; Lin Yueshan; He Zihao | Turkey; Öznur Cüre; Bülent Korkmaz | RPC; Stepanida Artakhinova; Bair Shigaev |
| Mixed team recurve | Open | RPC; Margarita Sidorenko; Kirill Smirnov | Italy; Elisabetta Mijno; Stefano Travisani | China; Wu Chunyan; Zhao Lixue |

== See also ==
- Archery at the 2020 Summer Olympics
