= Archery at the 2024 Summer Paralympics – Men's individual recurve open =

Archery, Men's recurve open at the XVII Paralympic Games
- Dates: 29 August – 4 September 2024
- Competitors: 30 from 24 nations

Medalists
1st place, gold medalist(s)		Harvinder Singh	India
2nd place, silver medalist(s)		Łukasz Ciszek	Poland
3rd place, bronze medalist(s)		Mohammad Reza Arab Ameri	Iran

The men's individual recurve open archery discipline at the 2024 Summer Paralympics will be contested from 29 August to 4 September at Les Invalides.

In the ranking rounds, each archer shoots 72 arrows and is seeded according to score. In the knock-out stages, each archer shoots three arrows per set against an opponent, the scores being aggregated. Losing semifinalists compete in a bronze medal match. As the field contained 30 archers, the two highest-ranked archers in the ranking round progressed directly to the round of 16 places.

== Record ==
Records are:

World record	Mohammad Reza Arab Ameri (IRI)	667	Hangzhou, China	23 October 2023
Paralympic record	Gholamreza Rahimi (IRI)	644	Tokyo, Japan	27 August 2021

== Ranking round ==
The ranking round of the men's individual recurve event was held on 29 August.

Rank	Archer	Nationality	10	X	Total	Note
1	Guillaume Toucoullet	France	25	7	652	PR
2	Kwak Geon-hwi	South Korea	23	8	647	PB
3	Kholidin	Indonesia	23	5	647	PB
4	Sadık Savaş	Turkey	21	10	646	PB
5	Mohammad Reza Arab Ameri	Iran	23	5	645	
6	Łukasz Ciszek	Poland	23	10	642	PB
7	Samuel Molina	Mexico	23	4	641	
8	Gholamreza Rahimi	Iran	20	5	640	
9	Harvinder Singh	India	19	5	637	
10	Gan Jun	China	19	5	636	SB
11	Stefano Travisani	Italy	20	3	627	
12	Suresh Selvathamby	Malaysia	15	5	625	SB
13	Hanreuchai Netsiri	Thailand	17	6	624	
14	Zhao Lixue	China	16	7	617	
15	Dejan Fabčič	Slovenia	15	8	615	SB
16	Héctor Ramírez	Colombia	13	4	611	
17	Juan Blas	Guatemala	15	5	606	
18	Yavuz Papağan	Turkey	16	6	605	SB
19	David Ivan	Slovakia	14	3	604	SB
20	Ruslan Tsymbaliuk	Ukraine	11	2	604	
21	Eric Bennett	United States	13	2	602	
22	Tomohiro Ueyama	Japan	15	6	599	
23	Taymon Kenton-Smith	Australia	8	1	596	
24	Tseng Lung-hui	Chinese Taipei	10	6	594	
25	Setiawan	Indonesia	13	3	592	
26	Al-Amin Hossain	Bangladesh	10	0	580	PB
27	Jordan White	United States	7	3	580	PB
28	Jahan Musayev	Azerbaijan	5	3	568	
29	Luciano Rezende	Brazil	6	1	495	
30	Vasyl Naumchuk	Ukraine	5	2	473	

Key

- PR = Paralympic Record
- PB = Personal Best
- SB = Season's Best

== Knockout rounds ==
The knockout rounds will be held on 4 September 2024.

=== Top half ===
Round of 32
17	Blas (GUA)	4	27	22	24	28	27
16	Ramírez (COL)	6	29	26	24	26	27
9	Singh (IND)	7	25	27	26	24	25
24	Tseng (TPE)	3	25	26	29	23	17
25	Setiawan (INA)	6	25	24	16	27	26
8	Rahimi (IRI)	4	24	22	25	29	23
5	Arab Ameri (IRI)	6	27	22	27	25	27
28	Musayev (AZE)	4	19	24	25	27	20
21	Bennett (USA)	2	18	23	25	24	–
12	Selvathamby (MAS)	6	23	24	23	28	–
13	Netsiri (THA) WSO	6	26	22	25	26	26
20	Tsymbaliuk (UKR)	5	25	24	26	26	24
29	Rezende (BRA)	0	20	23	24	–	–
4	Savaş (TUR)	6	29	28	26	–	–

Round of 16
1	Toucoullet (FRA)	4	26	26	27	28	26
16	Ramírez (COL)	6	27	28	25	24	28
9	Singh (IND)	6	27	28	28	28	-
25	Setiawan (INA)	2	28	25	27	15	-
5	Arab Ameri (IRI)	6	23	28	29	28	–
12	Selvathamby (MAS)	2	24	23	27	27	–
13	Netsiri (THA)	4	23	27	27	27	27
4	Savaş (TUR)	6	28	27	26	27	28

Quarterfinals
16	Ramírez (COL)	2	25	24	27	25	-
9	Singh (IND)	6	25	28	27	26	-
5	Arab Ameri (IRI)	6	26	28	27	-	-
4	Savaş (TUR)	0	24	27	17	-	-

Semifinals
9	Singh (IND)	7	25	27	27	26	26
5	Arab Ameri (IRI)	3	26	27	25	24	25

=== Bottom half ===
Round of 32
3	Kholidin (INA) DSQ
30	Naumchuk (UKR)
19	Ivan (SVK)	4	24	23	22	26	26
14	Zhao (CHN)	6	14	26	29	23	29
11	Travisani (ITA)	2	17	27	22	21	–
22	Ueyama (JPN)	6	28	24	27	27	–
27	White (USA)	2	25	26	23	24	–
6	Ciszek (POL)	6	25	27	23	27	–
7	Molina (MEX)	7	23	29	24	28	–
26	Hossain (BAN)	1	21	21	24	16	–
23	Kenton-Smith (AUS)	6	29	23	29	26	–
10	Gan (CHN)	2	24	26	23	24	–
15	Fabčič (SLO)	4	22	22	23	23	24
18	Papağan (TUR)	6	26	15	25	19	27

Round of 16
30	Naumchuk (UKR)	0	18	17	15	–	–
14	Zhao (CHN)	6	27	28	28	–	–
22	Ueyama (JPN)	3	27	26	24	28	26
6	Ciszek (POL)	7	23	26	28	29	29
7	Molina (MEX)	4	27	25	28	23	25
23	Kenton-Smith (AUS)	6	25	27	23	25	29
18	Papağan (TUR)	2	26	28	26	23
2	Kwok (KOR)	6	29	23	28	25

Quarterfinals
14	Zhao (CHN)	4	27	27	27	24	24
6	Ciszek (POL)	6	28	27	26	26	24
23	Kenton-Smith (AUS)	6	27	27	28	25	28
2	Kwok (KOR)	4	25	26	29	29	26

Semifinals
6	Ciszek (POL)	6	28	26	24	28	-
23	Kenton-Smith (AUS)	2	26	25	25	25	-

=== Finals ===
Gold medal match
9	Harvinder Singh (IND) (gold)	6	28	28	29	-	-
6	Łukasz Ciszek (POL) (silver)	0	24	27	25	-	-
Bronze medal match
5	Mohammad Reza Arab Ameri (IRI) (bronze)	6	28	26	25	–	–
23	Taymon Kenton-Smith (AUS)	0	25	23	24	–	–
