= List of world records in archery =

World records in archery are ratified by World Archery. Records are kept for all events contested at the Olympic and Paralympic Games.

== Olympic and Paralympic events ==
=== Men's records ===
| Event | Score | Name | Nation | Event | Location | Date | Ref |
Recurve
| 72 arrow ranking round | 702 | Brady Ellison | United States | 2019 Pan American Games | Lima, Peru | 7 August 2019 | |
| 216 arrow team ranking round | 2087 | Im Dong-hyun; Kim Bub-min; Oh Jin-hyek | South Korea | 2012 Olympics | London, United Kingdom | 27 July 2012 | |
Recurve (Open)
| 72 arrow ranking round | 667 | Mohammad Reza Arab Ameri | Iran | 2022 Asian Para Games | Hangzhou, China | 23 October 2023 | |
Compound (Open)
| 72 arrow ranking round | 709 | Ai Xinliang | China | 2023 World Para Archery Championships | Plzeň, Czech Republic | 18 July 2023 | |
| 15 arrow match | 150 9X | Alberto Simonelli | Italy | Campionati Italiani Targa | Turin, Italy | 25 September 2015 | |
| 144 arrow team ranking round | 1411 | He Zihao; Ai Xinliang | China | 2023 World Para Archery Championships | Plzeň, Czech Republic | 18 July 2023 | |
| 16 arrow team | 158 | Rakesh Kumar; Suraj Singh | India | 2022 Asian Para Games | Hangzhou, China | 24 October 2023 | |

=== Women's records ===
| Event | Score | Name | Nation | Event | Location | Date | Ref |
Recurve
| 72 arrow ranking round | 694 | Lim Si-hyeon | South Korea | 2024 Olympics | Paris, France | 25 July 2024 | |
| 216 arrow team ranking round | 2053 | Chang Hye-jin; Kang Chae-young; Lee Eun-gyeong | South Korea | 2018 Archery World Cup | Antalya, Turkey | 21 May 2018 | |
Recurve (Open)
| 72 arrow ranking round | 674 | Elisabetta Mijno | Italy | 2023 European Para Championships | Rotterdam, Netherlands | 15 August 2023 | |
Compound (Open)
| 72 arrow ranking round | 704 | Öznur Cüre | Turkey | 2024 Paralympics | Paris, France | 29 August 2024 | |
| 15 arrow match | 148 | Jessica Stretton | Great Britain | 2019 World Archery Para Championships | 's-Hertogenbosch, Netherlands | 6 June 2019 | |
| 144 arrow team ranking round | 1386 | Sheetal Devi; Sarita Adhana | India | 2023 World Para Archery Championships | Plzeň, Czech Republic | 18 July 2023 | |
| 16 arrow team match | 157 | Sarita Adhana; Sheetal Devi | India | 2023 World Para Archery Championships | Plzeň, Czech Republic | 28 June 2024 | |

=== Mixed team record ===
| Event | Score | Name | Nation | Games | | Date | Ref |
Recurve
| 144 arrow ranking round | 1388 | Kang Chae-young; Lee Woo-seok | South Korea | 2019 World Archery Championships | 's-Hertogenbosch, Netherlands | 10 June 2019 | |
Recurve (Open)
| 144 arrow ranking round | 1287 | Wang Sijun; Wu Chunyan | China | 2019 Asian Para Archery Championships | Bangkok, Thailand | 25 July 2024 | |
Compound (Open)
| 144 arrow ranking round | 1399 | Sheetal Devi; Rakesh Kumar | India | 2024 Paris Olympics | Paris, France | 29 August 2024 | |
| 16 arrow match | 158 | Eleonora Sarti; Alberto Simonelli | Italy | 2017 World Archery Para Championships | Beijing, China | 14 September 2017 | |
