= Archery at the 2016 Summer Paralympics – Men's individual recurve open =

Archery, Men's recurve open at the XV Paralympic Games
- Dates: September 10–13, 2016
- Competitors: 33

Medalists
1st place, gold medalist(s)		Gholamreza Rahimi	Iran
2nd place, silver medalist(s)		Hanreuchai Netsiri	Thailand
3rd place, bronze medalist(s)		Ebrahim Ranjbarkivaj	Iran

The Men's individual recurve open archery discipline at the 2016 Summer Paralympics was contested from September 10 to September 13. Ranking rounds took place on 10 September, while knockout rounds continued on September 13.

In the ranking rounds each archer shot 72 arrows, and was seeded according to score. In the knock-out stages each archer shot three arrows per set against an opponent, scoring two points for a won set and one for a draw. Matches were won by the first archer to six points, mirroring the Olympic format. Losing semifinalists competed in a bronze medal match.

== Ranking Round ==
PR = Paralympic Record.

Rank	Archer	Nation	Score	10's	X's	Notes
1	Ebrahim Ranjbarkivaj	Iran	637	19	6	
2	Hanreuchai Netsiri	Thailand	633	22	6	
3	Maik Szarszewski	Germany	629	18	5	
4	Tomohiro Ueyama	Japan	628	21	7	
5	Gholamreza Rahimi	Iran	624	21	6	
6	Roberto Airoldi	Italy	624	20	8	
7	Eric Bennett	United States	622	16	3	
8	Piotr Sawicki	Poland	621	19	5	
9	Kim Min-su	South Korea	617	8	3	
10	Tseng Lung-hui	Chinese Taipei	611	18	9	
11	Zhao Lixue	China	609	6	1	
12	Sampath Bandara Megahamulea	Sri Lanka	608	0	0	
13	Lee Hong-gu	South Korea	603	19	9	
14	Shi Xucheng	China	602	13	5	
15	Alessandro Erario	Italy	601	10	3	
16	David Phillips	Great Britain	595	12	4	
17	Francisco Cordeiro	Brazil	594	0	0	
18	Kimimasa Onodera	Japan	591	7	4	
19	Maxime Guerin	France	586	11	4	
20	Dambadondog Baatarjav	Mongolia	583	9	4	
21	Yu He	China	583	0	0	
22	Jawad Al-Musawi	Iraq	577	13	4	
23	Michael Lukow	United States	577	10	5	
24	Amarbayasgalan Ankhbayar	Mongolia	572	12	3	
25	Hasihin Sanawi	Malaysia	567	3	1	
26	Vaclav Kostal	Czech Republic	565	11	2	
27	Luciano Rezende	Brazil	557	6	4	
28	Kim Jung-hoon	South Korea	557	0	0	
29	German Gomez Perdomo	Colombia	556	0	0	
30	Diogo De Souza	Brazil	550	6	1	
31	Sadik Savas	Turkey	545	0	0	
32	Gints Jonasts	Latvia	541	7	3	
33	Vano Tsiklauri	Georgia	435	3	2	

== Knockout stage ==
=== Finals ===
Quarterfinals
1	Ebrahim Ranjbarkivaj (IRI)	2	0	1	2	2
8	Piotr Sawicki (POL)	0	2	1	0	0
5	Gholamreza Rahimi (IRI)	1	2	2	1
4	Tomohiro Ueyama (JPN)	1	0	0	1
3	Maik Szarszewski (GER)	1	0	0	2	1
27	Luciano Rezende (BRA)	1	2	2	0	1
7	Eric Bennett (USA)	0	0	0
2	Hanreuchai Netsiri (THA)	2	2	2

Semifinals
1	Ebrahim Ranjbarkivaj (IRI)	1	0	1	1	0
5	Gholamreza Rahimi (IRI)	1	2	1	1	2
27	Luciano Rezende (BRA)	0	0	0
2	Hanreuchai Netsiri (THA)	2	2	2

Gold medal match
5	Gholamreza Rahimi (IRI)	0	2	1	1	2	1st place, gold medalist(s)
2	Hanreuchai Netsiri (THA)	2	0	1	1	0	2nd place, silver medalist(s)
Bronze medal match
1	Ebrahim Ranjbarkivaj (IRI)	2	1	2	2	3rd place, bronze medalist(s)
27	Luciano Rezende (BRA)	0	1	0	0

=== Section 1 ===
Round of 32			Round of 16			Quarterfinals
1	Ebrahim Ranjbarkivaj (IRI)	6
32	Gints Jonasts (LAT)	2	1	Ebrahim Ranjbar (IRI)	6
17	Francisco Cordeiro (BRA)	2	16	David Phillips (GBR)	4
16	David Phillips (GBR)	6				1	Ebrahim Ranjbar (IRI)	7
9	Kim Min-su (KOR)	5				8	Piotr Sawicki (POL)	3
24	Amarbayasgalan Ankhbayar (MGL)	6	24	Amarbayasgalan Ankhbayar (MGL)	2
25	Hasihin Sanawi (MAS)	0	8	Piotr Sawicki (POL)	6
8	Piotr Sawicki (POL)	6

=== Section 2 ===
Round of 32			Round of 16			Quarterfinals
5	Gholamreza Rahimi (IRI)	6
28	Kim Jung-hoon (KOR)	2	5	Gholamreza Rahimi (IRI)	6
21	Yu He (CHN)	7	21	Yu He (CHN)	0
12	S.B. Megahamulea (SRI)	3				5	Gholamreza Rahimi (IRI)	6
13	Lee Hong-gu (KOR)	3				4	Tomohiro Ueyama (JPN)	2
20	Dambadondog Baatarjav (MGL)	7	20	Dambadondog Baatarjav (MGL)	4
29	German Gomez Perdomo (COL)	0	4	Tomohiro Ueyama (JPN)	6
4	Tomohiro Ueyama (JPN)	6

=== Section 3 ===
Round of 32			Round of 16			Quarter-finals
3	Maik Szarszewski (GER)	7
30	Diogo De Souza (BRA)	1	3	Maik Szarszewski (GER)	7
19	Maxime Guerin (FRA)	1	14	Shi Xucheng (CHN)	3
14	Shi Xucheng (CHN)	7				3	Maik Szarszewski (GER)	4
11	Zhao Lixue (CHN)	6				27	Luciano Rezende (BRA)	6
22	Jawad Al-Musawi (IRQ)	0	11	Zhao Lixue (CHN)	4
27	Luciano Rezende (BRA)	6	27	Luciano Rezende (BRA)	6
6	Roberto Airoldi (ITA)	0

=== Section 4 ===
Round of 32			Round of 16			Quarter-finals
7	Eric Bennett (USA)	7
26	Vaclav Kostel (CZE)	3	7	Eric Bennett (USA)	6
23	Michael Lukow (USA)	0	10	Tseng Lung-hui (TPE)	4
10	Tseng Lung-hui (TPE)	6				7	Eric Bennett (USA)	0
15	Alessandro Erario (ITA)	6				2	Hanreuchai Netsiri (THA)	6
18	Kimimasa Onedera (JPN)	0	15	Alessandro Erario (ITA)	1
31	Sadik Savas (TUR)	2	2	Hanreuchai Netsiri (THA)	7
2	Hanreuchai Netsiri (THA)	6
