= World Para Archery Championship =

Biannual para-archery competition

World Para Archery Championship was first held in 1998 in the UK and takes place every two years.

== Events ==
Number	Year	Location	Events
1	1998	(United Kingdom) Stoke Mandeville	9
2	1999	(New Zealand) Christchurch	9
3	2001	(Czech Republic) Nymburk	10
4	2003	(Spain) Madrid	10
5	2005	(Italy) Massa Carrara	11
6	2007	(South Korea) Cheongju	12
7	2009	(Czech Republic) Nymburk	12
8	2011	(Italy) Turin	14
9	2013	(Thailand) Bangkok	13
10	2015	(Germany) Donaueschingen	16
11	2017	(China) Beijing	14
12	2019	(Netherlands) Hertogenbosch	16
13	2022	(United Arab Emirates) Dubai	16
14	2023	(Czech Republic) Plzeň	17
15	2025	(South Korea) Gwangju	17

== Champions ==
=== Recurve Standing / Open ===
Men

Event	Gold	Silver	Bronze
1998 Stoke Mandeville	Imrich Lyocsa; Slovakia	Waldemar Dusold; Germany	Tomasz Lezanski; Poland
1999 Christchurch	Raimo Tirronen; Finland	Ryszard Bukanski; Poland	Felix Marquez; Spain
2001 Nymburk	An Tae-Sung; South Korea	Wanchai Chaivarin; Thailand	Jean-Francois Garcia; France
2003 Madrid	Imrich Lyocsa; Slovakia	An Tae-sung; South Korea	Serhiy Atamanenko; Ukraine
2005 Massa Carrara	Serhiy Atamanenko; Ukraine	Imrich Lyocsa; Slovakia	Tomasz Lezanski; Poland
2007 Cheongju	Dong Zhi; China	An Tae-sung; South Korea	Imrich Lyocsa; Slovakia
2009 Nymburk	Mustafa Ak; Turkey	Fabrice Meunier; France	Timur Tuchinov; Russia
2011 Turin	Dong Zhi; China	Kim Suk Ho; South Korea	Timur Tuchinov; Russia
2013 Bangkok	Timur Tuchinov; Russia	Yuriy Kopiy; Ukraine	Vaclav Kostal; Czech Republic
2015 Donaueschingen	Eric Bennett; United States	Shi Xucheng; China	Gholamreza Rahimi; Iran
2017 Beijing	Zhao Lixue; China	Hanreuchai Netsiri; Thailand	Anton Ziapaev; Russia
2019 Den Bosch	Suresh Selvathamby; Malaysia	Eric Bennett; United States	Bato Tsydendorzhiev; Russia
2022 Dubai	Tomohiro Ueyama; Japan	Guillaume Toucoullet; France	Park Jun Beom; South Korea
2023 Plzeň	Kevin Mather; United States	Ruslan Tsymbaliuk; Ukraine	Mohammad Reza Arab Ameri; Iran
2025 Gwangju	Stefano Travisani; Italy	Anton Ziapaev; Individual Neutral Athletes	Hanreuchai Netsiri; Thailand

Women

Event	Gold	Silver	Bronze
1998 Stoke Mandeville	Anita Chapman; Great Britain	Birthe Houling Mogensen; Denmark	Zofia Doman; Poland
1999 Christchurch	Anita Chapman; Great Britain	Malgorzata Olejnik; Poland	Wieslawa Staszalek; Poland
2001 Nymburk	Lee Hwa Sook; South Korea	Olena Skubak; Ukraine	Lee Kyung Hee; South Korea
2003 Madrid	Alicja Bukańska; Poland	Natalie Cordowiner; Australia	Malgorzata Olejnik; Poland
2005 Massa Carrara	Lee Hwa Sook; South Korea	Alicja Bukańska; Poland	Bohdana Nikitenko; Ukraine
2007 Cheongju	Alicja Bukańska; Poland	Anna Tzika; Greece	Lee Hwa Sook; South Korea
2009 Nymburk	Eliane Salden-Otten; Netherlands	Kim Ran Sook; South Korea	Lee Hwa Sook; South Korea
2011 Turin	Gao Fangxia; China	Irina Batorova; Russia	Magali Comte; Switzerland
2013 Bangkok	Brigitte Duboc; France	Liang Qiurong; China	Milena Olszewska; Poland
2015 Donaueschingen	Wu Chunyan; China	Svetlana Barantseva; Russia	Elisabetta Mijno; Italy
2017 Beijing	Zahra Nemati; Iran	Merve Nur Eroğlu; Turkey	Wu Chunyan; China
2019 Den Bosch	Wu Chunyan; China	Milena Olszewska; Poland	Svetlana Barantseva; Russia
2022 Dubai	Vincenza Petrilli; Italy	Pooja; India	Milena Olszewska; Poland
2023 Plzeň	Wu Chunyan; China	Milena Olszewska; Poland	Wu Yang; China
2025 Gwangju	Wu Chunyan; China	Gao Zihan; China	Wang Xueqian; China

=== Recurve W2 ===
Men

Event	Gold	Silver	Bronze
1998 Stoke Mandeville	Lee Ouk Soo; South Korea	Giuseppe Gabelli; Italy	James Buchanan; Great Britain
1999 Christchurch	Jung Young Joo; South Korea	Pertti Pulkkinen; Finland	Wong Ping Sun; Hong Kong
2001 Nymburk	Lee Ouk Soo; South Korea	Andrew Baylis; Great Britain	Jung Young Joo; South Korea
2003 Madrid	Lee Ouk Soo; South Korea	Oscar de Pellegrin; Italy	Lee Hong Gu; Hong Kong
2005 Massa Carrara	Lee Hong Gu; South Korea	Mario Oehme; Germany	Piotr Sawicki; Poland
2007 Cheongju	Lee Hong Gu; South Korea	Muhammad Salam Sidik; Malaysia	Oscar de Pellegrin; Italy
2009 Nymburk	Muhammad Salam Sidik; Malaysia	Lee Hong Gu; South Korea	Russell Wolfe; United States
2011 Turin (W1/W2)	Ebrahim Ranjbarkivaj; Iran	Lee Myeong Gu; South Korea	Muhammad Salam Sidik; Malaysia
2013 Bangkok	Hanreuchai Netsiri; Thailand	Paul Browne; Great Britain	Tseng Lung Hui; Chinese Taipei

Women

Event	Gold	Silver	Bronze
1998 Stoke Mandeville	Kathy Critchlow-Smith; Great Britain	Grace Gaughan; Ireland	Shigeko Matsueda; Japan
1999 Christchurch	Paola Fantato; Italy	Grace Gaughan; Ireland	Neroli Fairhall; New Zealand
2001 Nymburk	Paola Fantato; Italy	Ko Hee Sook; South Korea	Anna Menconi; Italy
2003 Madrid	Sandra Truccolo; Italy	Naomi Isozaki; Japan	Paola Fantato; Italy
2005 Massa Carrara	Nako Hirasawa; Japan	Marketa Sidkova; Czech Republic	Kathy Critchlow-Smith; Great Britain
2007 Cheongju	Xiao Yanhong; China	Lelia Maufras Du Chatellier; France	Kate Murray; Great Britain
2009 Nymburk	Gizem Girişmen; Turkey	Marketa Sidkova; Czech Republic	Lelia Maufras Du Chatellier; France
2011 Turin (W1/W2)	Xiao Yanhong; China	Zahra Nemati; Iran	Hatice Bayar; Turkey
2013 Bangkok	Zahra Nemati; Iran	Xiao Yanhong; China	Lee Mi Hyang; South Korea

=== Recurve Team Events ===
Men

Men's doubles were contested from 2023

Event	Gold	Silver	Bronze
1998 Stoke Mandeville	Finland		
1999 Christchurch	Slovakia		
2001 Nymburk	South Korea		
2003 Madrid	South Korea		
2005 Massa Carrara	South Korea		
2007 Cheongju	South Korea		
2009 Nymburk	Spain	Turkey	Russia
2011 Turin	Russia	South Korea	Ukraine
2013 Bangkok	Russia	France	Great Britain
2015 Donaueschingen	Russia	South Korea	China
2017 Beijing	Russia	United States	Poland
2019 Den Bosch	United States	Russia	China
2022 Dubai	Iran	Great Britain	Russian Archery Federation
2023 Plzen	Turkey	China	Iran
2025 Gwangju	China	Slovakia	South Korea

Women

Women's doubles were contested from 2023.

Event	Gold	Silver	Bronze
1998 Stoke Mandeville	Italy		
1999 Christchurch	Italy		
2001 Nymburk	South Korea		
2003 Madrid	South Korea		
2005 Massa Carrara	Japan		
2007 Cheongju	China	Great Britain	South Korea
2009 Nymburk	South Korea	Czech Republic	Turkey
2011 Turin	China	South Korea	Iran
2013 Bangkok	China	Thailand	South Korea
2015 Donaueschingen	China	Russia	South Korea
2017 Beijing	China	Russia	Italy
2019 Den Bosch	China	Turkey	Italy
2022 Dubai	Italy	Russian Archery Federation	Mongolia
2023 Plzen	China	Italy	Turkey
2025 Gwangju	Mongolia	South Korea	China

Mixed

Event	Gold	Silver	Bronze
2011 Turin	Iran	China	Thailand
2013 Bangkok	Poland	Ukraine	Iran
2015 Donaueschingen	China	Russia	Italy
2017 Beijing	Italy	Brazil	Iran
2019 Den Bosch	Russia	Italy	China
2022 Dubai	Italy	Thailand	Poland
2023 Plzen	China	Italy	Japan
2025 Gwangju	Mongolia	Italy	China

=== Compound Open ===
Men

Event	Gold	Silver	Bronze
1998 Stoke Mandeville	Alberto Simonelli; Italy	Hsu Jui Jen; Chinese Taipei	Giovanni Mirabella; Italy
1999 Christchurch	John Murray; Great Britain	John Olav Johanson; Norway	Makoto Sakashita; Japan
2001 Nymburk	Anders Grondberg; Sweden	Alberto Simonelli; Italy	Giovanni Mirabella; Italy
2003 Madrid	Keijo Kallunki; Finland	Ernst Ortlieb; Germany	John Murray; Great Britain
2005 Massa Carrara	John Stubbs; Great Britain	Alberto Simonelli; Italy	Lee Ouk Soo; South Korea
2007 Cheongju	Kevin Evans; Canada	Lee Ouk Soo; South Korea	Kweon Hyun Ju; South Korea
2009 Nymburk	Kevin Evans; Canada	Pavlo Nazar; Ukraine	Fred Stevens; Great Britain
2011 Turin	Philippe Horner; Switzerland	John Stubbs; Great Britain	Abdullah Sener; Turkey
2013 Bangkok	John Stubbs; Great Britain	Jere Forsberg; Finland	Gianpaolo Cancelli; Italy
2015 Donaueschingen	Lee Ouk Soo; South Korea	Alberto Simonelli; Italy	John Stubbs; Great Britain
2017 Beijing	Ai Xinliang; China	Andre Shelby; United States	Ben Thompson; United States
2019 Den Bosch	Ben Thompson; United States	Murat Turan; Turkey	Matt Stutzman; United States
2022 Dubai	Matt Stutzman; United States	Aleksandr Gombozhapov; Russian Archery Federation	Bair Shigaev; Russian Archery Federation
2023 Plzeň	Matteo Bonacina; Italy	Nathan MacQueen; Great Britain	Jonathon Milne; Australia
2025 Gwangju	Toman Kumar; India	Rakesh Kumar; India	Nathan MacQueen; Great Britain

Women

Event	Gold	Silver	Bronze
1998 Stoke Mandeville	Ann-Christine Nilsson; Sweden	Irene Monaco; Italy	Maria Carmen Rubio; Spain
1999 Christchurch	Brenda Saxon; Great Britain	Clazien Heiliegers; Netherlands	Only two competitors
2001 Nymburk	Brenda Saxon; Great Britain	Pippa Britton; Great Britain	Only two competitors
2003 Madrid	Bruna Coladarci; Italy	Pippa Britton; Great Britain	Maria Carmen Rubio; Spain
2005 Massa Carrara	Melanie Clarke; Great Britain	Bruna Coladarci; Italy	Pippa Britton; Great Britain
2007 Cheongju	Danielle Brown; Great Britain	Wang Li; China	Gülbin Su; Turkey
2009 Nymburk	Danielle Brown; Great Britain	Melanie Clarke; Great Britain	Olga Polegaeva; Russia
2011 Turin	Danielle Brown; Great Britain	Stepanida Artakhinova; Russia	Zandra Reppe; Sweden
2013 Bangkok	Burcu Dağ; Turkey	Danielle Brown; Great Britain	Melanie Clarke; Great Britain
2015 Donaueschingen	Eleonora Sarti; Italy	Lin Yueshan; China	Kim Mi Soon; South Korea
2017 Beijing	Zhou Jiamin; China	Tatiana Andrievskaia; Russia	Lin Yueshan; China
2019 Den Bosch	Nur Syahidah Alim; Singapore	Jessica Stretton; Great Britain	Tatiana Andrievskaia; Russia
2022 Dubai	Tatiana Andrievskaia; Russian Archery Federation	Maria Andrea Virgilio; Italy	Phoebe Paterson Pine; Great Britain
2023 Plzeň	Öznur Cüre; Turkey	Sheetal Devi; India	Jane Karla Gogel; Brazil
2025 Gwangju	Sheetal Devi; India	Öznur Cüre; Turkey	Jodie Grinham; Great Britain

=== Compound W1 ===
Men

Event	Gold	Silver	Bronze
1998 Stoke Mandeville	Zdenek Sebek; Czech Republic	Reiner Schmidt; Germany	Olivier Hatem; France
1999 Christchurch	Zdenek Sebek; Czech Republic	Franz Kikken; Netherlands	Koichi Minami; Japan
2001 Nymburk	Zdenek Sebek; Czech Republic	John Cavanagh; Great Britain	Larry Townes; United States
2003 Madrid	Jeff Fabry; United States	Zdenek Sebek; Czech Republic	Anders Grondberg; Sweden
2005 Massa Carrara	Jeff Fabry; United States	Jean-Pierre Antonios; Finland	Robert Lehner; Switzerland
2007 Cheongju	Jeff Fabry; United States	Osmo Kinnunen; Finland	An Seong-Pyo; South Korea
2009 Nymburk	Peter Kinik; Slovakia	Jeff Fabry; United States	Norbert Murphy; Canada
2011 Turin	Osmo Kinnunen; Finland	David Drahoninsky; Czech Republic	Jean-Pierre Antonios; Finland
2013 Bangkok	Jean-Pierre Antonios; Finland	Jeff Fabry; United States	David Drahoninsky; Czech Republic

=== Compound Teams Events ===
Men's Open

Men's doubles were contested from 2023.

Event	Gold	Silver	Bronze
2001 Nymburk	Italy		
2003 Madrid	United States		
2005 Massa Carrara	South Korea		
2007 Cheongju	South Korea		
2009 Nymburk	South Korea	Great Britain	Germany
2011 Turin	Great Britain	South Korea	Sweden
2013 Bangkok	Great Britain	Italy	Slovakia
2015 Donaueschingen	United States	Turkey	Italy
2017 Beijing	Italy	Iran	United States
2019 Den Bosch	Iran	Turkey	China
2022 Dubai	Iran	Australia	Slovakia
2023 Plzen	China	Iran	United States
2025 Gwangju	United States	China	Great Britain

Men's W1

Event	Gold	Silver	Bronze
2011 Turin	Czech Republic	United States	Japan

Women

Women's doubles were contested from 2023.

Event	Gold	Silver	Bronze
2007 Cheongju	Great Britain		
2009 Nymburk	Great Britain	Japan	Turkey
2011 Turin	Russia	Great Britain	China
2013 Bangkok	Russia	United States	Japan
2015 Donaueschingen	Russia	Germany	Italy
2017 Beijing	Iran	China	Russia
2019 Den Bosch	China	Great Britain	Russia
2022 Dubai	Turkey	Russian Archery Federation	Iran
2023 Plzen	United Kingdom	Brazil	India
2025 Gwangju	Turkey	India	Great Britain

Mixed

Event	Gold	Silver	Bronze
2011 Turin	Russia	Great Britain	Sweden
2013 Bangkok	Turkey	Great Britain	Italy
2015 Donaueschingen	China	Great Britain	Italy
2017 Beijing	Russia	Iran	Great Britain
2019 Den Bosch	China	Russia	Italy
2022 Dubai	Russia Archery Federation	India	Great Britain
2022 Plzen	India	Brazil	China
2025 Gwangju	China	Turkey	India

=== Recurve/Compound Wheelchair (W1) ===
Men

Event	Gold	Silver	Bronze
2015 Donaueschingen	David Drahoninsky; Czech Republic	John Walker; Great Britain	Fabio Azzolini; Italy
2017 Beijing	Jeff Fabry; United States	Ömer Aşık; Turkey	Konstantin Donskoi; Russia
2019 Den Bosch	Bahattin Hekimoğlu; Turkey	Li Ji; China	David Drahoninsky; Czech Republic
2022 Dubai	Yiğit Caner Aydın; Turkey	Nihat Türkmenoğlu; Turkey	David Drahoninsky; Czech Republic
2023 Plzeň	Christopher Davis; Australia	Bahattin Hekimoğlu; Turkey	David Drahoninsky; Czech Republic
2025 Gwangju	Zhang Tianxin; China	Jason Tabansky; United States	Park Hong-jo; South Korea

Women

Event	Gold	Silver	Bronze
2015 Donaueschingen	Guo Ying; China	Jo Frith; Great Britain	Jessica Stretton; Great Britain
2017 Beijing	Jessica Stretton; Great Britain	Jo Frith; Great Britain	Victoria Rumary; Great Britain
2019 Den Bosch	Elena Krutova; Russia	Kim Ok Geum; South Korea	Liu Jing; China
2022 Dubai	Lisa Coryell; United States	Nil Mısır; Turkey	Elena Krutova; Russian Archery Federation
2023 Plzeň	Zhang Lu; China	Asia Pellizzari; Italy	Chen Minyi; China
2025 Gwangju	Šárka Musilová; Czech Republic	Isabel Fernández Jiménez; Spain	Tereza Brandtlová; Czech Republic

Men's Team

Men's doubles were contested from 2023.

Event	Gold	Silver	Bronze
2015 Donaueschingen	United States	Russia	China
2017 Beijing	Turkey	Russia	Italy
2019 Den Bosch	Turkey	China	Russia
2022 Dubai	Turkey	Russian Archery Federation	Czech Republic
2023 Plzen	China	Turkey	Czech Republic
2025 Gwangju	China	Turkey	South Korea

Women

Women's doubles were contested from 2023.

Event	Gold	Silver	Bronze
2022 Dubai	Russian Archery Federation	Turkey	Only two teams entered
2023 Plzen	China	Italy	Czech Republic
2025 Gwangju	South Korea	China	Czech Republic

Mixed Team

Event	Gold	Silver	Bronze
2015 Donaueschingen	Great Britain	China	Russia
2017 Beijing	Great Britain	Russia	Japan
2019 Den Bosch	China	Russia	Japan
2022 Dubai	Russian Archery Federation	Italy	Czech Republic
2023 Plzen	Czech Republic	Italy	South Korea
2025 Gwangju	China	Czech Republic	South Korea

=== Visual Impairment ===
Open

Event	Gold	Silver	Bronze
2005 Massa Carrara	Massimo Oddone; Italy	Ruben Van Hollebeke; Belgium	Lorenzo Biava; Italy
2007 Cheongju	Steve Prowse; Great Britain	Janice Walth; Australia	Melissa Carter; Australia
2009 Nymburk	Massimiliano Piombo; Italy	Ruben Van Hollebeke; Belgium	Janice Walth; United States

Visually Impaired 1

Event	Gold	Silver	Bronze
2015 Donaueschingen	Janice Walth; United States	Roger Rees-Evans; Great Britain	Hazel Hockley; Australia
2019 Den Bosch	Ruben Van Hollebeke; Belgium	Christos Misos; Cyprus	Daniel Martin Anaya; Spain
2022 Dubai	Ruben Van Hollebeke; Belgium	Tanveer Ahmed; Pakistan	Daniele Piran; Italy
2023 Plzeň	Matteo Panariello; Italy	Craig Newbery; Australia	Ruben Van Hollebeke; Belgium
2025 Gwangju	Christos Misos; Cyprus	Ruben Van Hollebeke; Belgium	Craig Newbery; Australia

Visually Impaired 2/3

Event	Gold	Silver	Bronze
2015 Donaueschingen	Steve Prowse; Great Britain	Peter Price; Great Britain	Carmel Bassett; Great Britain
2019 Den Bosch	Steve Prowse; Great Britain	Giovanni Maria Vaccaro; Italy	Nicholas Thomas; Great Britain
2023 Plzeň	Steve Prowse; Great Britain	Daniele Piran; Italy	Nicholas Thomas; Great Britain
2025 Gwangju	Nicholas Thomas; Great Britain	Kathleen Meurrens; Belgium	Mihai Bursuc; Romania

== See also ==
- European Para-Archery Championships
