= 2025 World Para Archery Championships – Visually impaired 1 =

Visually impaired 1 at the 2025 World Para Archery Championships
- Venue: Gwangju International Archery Center
- Location: Gwangju, South Korea
- Dates: 26–27 September

Medalists
gold medal	Christos Misos	Cyprus
silver medal	Ruben Vanhollebeke	Belgium
bronze medal	Craig Newbery	Australia

The visually impaired 1 competition at the 2025 World Para Archery Championships, which took place from 26 to 27 September 2025 in Gwangju, South Korea. Matteo Panariello of Italy was the defending champion. Christos Misos won Cyprus' first-ever gold medal at the World Para Archery Championships.

== Schedule ==
All times are in Korea Standard Time (UTC+09:00).

Date	Time	Round
Thursday, 25 September		Official practice
Friday, 26 September	09:00	Qualification round
Friday, 26 September	12:35 13:10; 13:45	Elimination Round; First round Final Round; Quarter-finals; Semi-finals
Saturday, 27 September	10:02; 10:22	Final Round; Bronze-medal match Gold-medal match

== Qualification Round ==
The qualification round was held on 26 September 2025.

High green denotes a bye in first round.
Light green denotes entering from first round.

Rank	Name	Nation	Score	10+X	X
1	Ruben Vanhollebeke	Belgium	507 WR	0	0
2	Cho Jong Seok	South Korea	449	6	2
3	Christos Misos	Cyprus	414	5	2
4	Janice Walth	United States	409	3	1
5	Craig Newbery	Australia	364	2	1
6	Jordi Casellas Albiol	Andorra	321	2	1
7	Ivan Yanev	Bulgaria	281	1	0
8	Pawan Kumar	India	278	2	1
9	Clive Jones	Great Britain	198	0	0

== Elimination round ==
The elimination and knockout rounds will take place from September 26 to 27, 2025.

Round of 16
9	(United Kingdom) Clive Jones	6
8	(India) Pawan Kumar	0

Quarterfinals
1	(Belgium) Ruben Vanhollebeke	6
9	(United Kingdom) Clive Jones	0
5	(Australia) Craig Newbery	6
4	(United States) Janice Walth	4
3	(Cyprus) Christos Misos	6
6	(Andorra) Jordi Casellas Albiol	0
7	(Bulgaria) Ivan Yanev	0
2	(South Korea) Cho Jong Seok	6

Semifinals
1	(Belgium) Ruben Vanhollebeke	6
5	(Australia) Craig Newbery	0
3	(Cyprus) Christos Misos	7
2	(South Korea) Cho Jong Seok	3

Finals
1	(Belgium) Ruben Vanhollebeke	4
3	(Cyprus) Christos Misos	6
Bronze medal match
5	(Australia) Craig Newbery	6
2	(South Korea) Cho Jong Seok	0
