= Archery at the 2020 Summer Paralympics – Women's individual recurve open =

Archery, Women's recurve open at the XVI Paralympic Games
- Venue: Yumenoshima Park Archery Field
- Dates: 27 August 2021 (ranking round); 2 September 2021 (match play)
- Competitors: 24 from 19 nations

Medalists
1st place, gold medalist(s)		Zahra Nemati	Iran
2nd place, silver medalist(s)		Vincenza Petrilli	Italy
3rd place, bronze medalist(s)		Wu Chunyan	China

The women's individual recurve open archery discipline at the 2020 Summer Paralympics was held from 27 August to 2 September.

In the ranking rounds each archer shoots 72 arrows, and is seeded according to score. In the knock-out stages each archer shoots three arrows per set against an opponent, the scores being aggregated. Losing semifinalists compete in a bronze medal match.

== Ranking round ==
The ranking round of the women's individual recurve open event was held on 27 August.

Rank	Archer	Nation	10s	Xs	Score	Notes
1	Wu Chunyan	China	20	5	642	PR
2	Elisabetta Mijno	Italy	20	6	633	PB
3	Zahra Nemati	Iran	7	0	630	
4	Vincenza Petrilli	Italy	15	5	625	PB
5	Margarita Sidorenko	RPC	15	4	605	
6	Phattharaphon Pattawaeo	Thailand	12	7	599	PB
7	Dorothea Poimenidou	Greece	10	4	586	SB
8	Chika Shigesada	Japan	9	3	584	
9	Gao Fangxia	China	7	0	582	
10	Milena Olszewska	Poland	2	1	581	
11	Fabiola Dergovics	Brazil	1	0	572	
12	Hazel Chaisty	Great Britain	11	4	571	SB
13	Imalia Oktrininda	Australia	6	3	564	PB
14	María Daza	Colombia	7	2	559	PB
15	Yağmur Şengül	Turkey	9	4	557	
16	Zaman Al-Saedi	Iraq	10	1	554	SB
17	Roksolana Dzoba-Balyan	Ukraine	8	0	554	
18	Zehra Özbey Torun	Turkey	7	1	554	SB
19	Svetlana Barantseva	RPC	8	5	537	SB
20	Jo Jang-moon	South Korea	5	1	505	
21	Ieva Melle	Latvia	6	2	495	
22	Emma Rose Ravish	United States	3	0	492	
23	Dembereliin Selengee	Mongolia	6	3	461	
24	Kim Ran-sook	South Korea	1	1	461	

== Elimination rounds ==
The elimination round took place on 2 September 2021.

=== Top half ===
Round of 32
17	Dzoba-Balyan (UKR)	6	23	18	23	25	22
16	Al-Saedi (IRQ)	4	20	18	21	27	22
9	Gao (CHN)	7	23	24	25	24	27
24	Kim (KOR)	3	22	25	23	24	22
21	Melle (LAT)	3	20	21	18	22	14
12	Chaisty (GBR)	7	14	24	18	23	20
13	Oktrininda (AUS)	7	20	27	21	23
20	Jo (KOR)	1	16	14	21	15

Round of 16
1	Wu (CHN)	6	24	24	30
17	Dzoba-Balyan (UKR)	0	22	21	24
9	Gao (CHN)	1	24	24	19	24
8	Shigesada (JPN)	7	25	24	24	26
5	Sidorenko (RPC)	5 ^{9}	24	17	25	25	22
12	Chaisty (GBR)	6 ^{9+}	23	19	20	26	22
13	Oktrininda (AUS)	0	17	24	23
4	Petrilli (ITA)	6	21	25	25

Quarterfinals
1	Wu (CHN)	7	28	28	25	23
8	Shigesada (JPN)	1	24	24	25	22
12	Chaisty (GBR)	2	23	26	22	26
4	Petrilli (ITA)	6	23	26	23	27

Semifinals
1	Wu (CHN)	5 ^{8}	27	25	26	23	27
4	Petrilli (ITA)	6 ^{9}	26	26	27	23	26

=== Bottom half ===
Round of 32
19	Barantseva (RPC)	6	21	22	22	23	21
14	Daza (COL)	4	20	23	16	23	21
11	Dergovics (BRA)	6	17	24	20	21	27
22	Ravish (USA)	4	18	22	20	21	20
23	D. Selengee (MGL)	4	8	23	24	29	20
10	Olszewska (POL)	6	24	21	29	23	26
15	Şengül (TUR)	4	13	27	20	19	18
18	Özbey Torun (TUR)	6	19	21	16	25	28

Round of 16
3	Nemati (IRI)	6 ^{10}	26	24	27	26	24
19	Barantseva (RPC)	5 ^{8}	12	30	16	26	25
11	Dergovics (BRA)	7	22	25	26	24
6	Pattawaeo (THA)	1	20	24	26	22
7	Poimenidou (GRE)	6	26	27	25	26
10	Olszewska (POL)	2	25	26	26	23
18	Özbey Torun (TUR)	0	20	17	24
2	Mijno (ITA)	6	28	27	25

Quarterfinals
3	Nemati (IRI)	7	27	23	26	30
11	Dergovics (BRA)	1	26	23	21	24
7	Poimenidou (GRE)	6 ^{9}	23	28	25	27	26
2	Mijno (ITA)	5 ^{8}	23	25	27	28	25

Semifinals
3	Nemati (IRI)	6	25	30	25	28
7	Poimenidou (GRE)	2	28	26	24	24

=== Finals ===
Gold medal match
4	Petrilli (ITA)	5 ^{9}	21	28	20	22	25
3	Nemati (IRI)	6 ^{10}	27	28	25	21	23
Bronze medal match
1	Wu (CHN)	6	27	29	26	28
7	Poimenidou (GRE)	2	23	30	24	26
