= Vedat Aksoy =

Turkish para-archer (born 1988)

Personal information
- Nationality: Turkish
- Born: 20 March 1988 (age 37) Istanbul, Turkey

Sport
- Country: Turkey
- Sport: Paralympic archery
- Event: Recurve bow

Vedat Aksoy (born 20 March 1988) is a Turkish Paralympian archer competing in the Men's recurve bow event. He is competing at the 2020 Summer Paralympics in the Individual recurve open and Mixed team recurve events.
