= Bhutan at the 2020 Summer Paralympics =

- IPC code: BHU
- NPC: Bhutan Paralympic Committee

in Tokyo
- Competitors: 3 in 2 sports

Summer Paralympics appearances (overview)
- 2020; 2024

Bhutan competed at the 2020 Summer Paralympics in Tokyo, Japan, from 24 August to 5 September 2021. This was the country's debut appearance at the Paralympics.

== Competitors ==
Sport	Men	Women	Total
Athletics	1	1	2
Archery	1	0	1
Total	2	1	3

== Archery ==
Bhutan qualified one athlete for Archery event.

Athlete	Event	Ranking round		Round of 32	Round of 16	Quarterfinals	Semifinals	Finals	
Athlete	Event	Score	Seed	Opposition score	Opposition score	Opposition score	Opposition score	Opposition score	Rank
Pema Rigsel	Men's individual recurve	523	30	Smirnov (RPC); L 2-6	did not advance				

== Athletics ==
Bhutan is scheduled to compete in athletics. Bhutan was granted two berths through the Bipartite Commission invitation allocation on 5 May 2021.

Athlete	Event	Final	
Athlete	Event	Result	Rank
Gyeltshen Gyeltshen	Men's shot put F40	6.31	9 PB
Chimi Dema	Women's shot put F40	5.04	9

== See also ==
- Bhutan at the Paralympics
- Bhutan at the 2020 Summer Olympics
