= Archery at the 2022 Asian Para Games =

- Location: Hangzhou, China
- Dates: 23–28 October

Archery at the 2022 Asian Para Games was held in Hangzhou, China between 23 and 28 October 2023.

== Nations ==
1. Bangladesh (5)
2. Bhutan (1)
3. China (17)
4. Hong Kong (6)
5. India (13)
6. Indonesia (5)
7. Iran (11)
8. Iraq (2)
9. Japan (5)
10. Kazakhstan (9)
11. Kyrgyzstan (2)
12. South Korea (11)
13. Malaysia (5)
14. Mongolia (4)
15. Nepal (2)
16. Pakistan (1)
17. Philippines (4)
18. Singapore (1)
19. Sri Lanka (2)
20. Chinese Taipei (6)
21. Thailand (12)
22. United Arab Emirates (1)

== Entries ==
Events	MI	MT	WI	WT	XT
Recurve	35	13	19	8	10
Compound	31	11	24	8	11
W1	13	4	3	0	2

MI = Men Individual

WI = Women Individual

MT = Men Team (Doubles)

WT = Women Team (Doubles)

XT = Mixed Team (Doubles)

== Medal table ==
Rank	NPC	Gold	Silver	Bronze	Total
1	China (CHN)	6	5	3	14
2	Iran (IRI)	5	1	3	9
3	India (IND)	2	3	2	7
4	South Korea (KOR)	1	2	0	3
5	Japan (JPN)	0	1	1	2
6	Singapore (SGP)	0	1	0	1
7	Indonesia (INA)	0	0	2	2
8	Chinese Taipei (TPE)	0	0	1	1
Totals (8 entries)		14	13	12	39

== Medalists ==
=== Men ===
Event	Class	Gold	Silver	Bronze
Individual	W1	Zhang Tianxin; China	Han Guifei; China	Mohammadreza Zandi; Iran
Doubles	W1	China; Han Guifei; Zhang Tianxin	South Korea; Park Hong-jo; Jang Dae-sung	India; Adil Mohamed Nazir Ansari; Naveen Dalal
Individual compound	Open	Alisina Manshaezadeh; Iran	Rakesh Kumar; India	Ken Swagumilang; Indonesia
Individual recurve	Open	Gholamreza Rahimi; Iran	Tomohiro Ueyama; Japan	Zhao Lixue; China
Doubles compound	Open	China; Ai Xinliang; He Zihao	India; Rakesh Kumar; Suraj Singh	Chinese Taipei; Wu Chung-hung; Yang Jyun-kai
Doubles recurve	Open	Iran; Mohammad Reza Arab Ameri; Gholamreza Rahimi	China; Gan Jun; Zhao Lixue	India; Harvinder Singh; Sahil

=== Women ===
Event	Class	Gold	Silver	Bronze
Individual	W1	Chen Minyi; China	Kim Ok-geum; South Korea	not awarded
Individual compound	Open	Sheetal Devi; India	Nur Syahidah Alim; Singapore	Lin Yueshan; China
Individual recurve	Open	Zahra Nemati; Iran	Wu Yang; China	Wu Chunyan; China
Doubles compound	Open	China; Lin Yueshan; Zhang Lu	India; Sheetal Devi; Sarita Devi	Iran; Maryam Yavarpoor Shahrbabaki; Farzaneh Asgari
Doubles recurve	Open	China; Wu Chunyan; Wu Yang	Iran; Zahra Nemati; Somayeh Rahimi Ghahderijani	Indonesia; Wahyu Retno Wulandari; Mahda Aulia

=== Mixed ===
Event	Class	Gold	Silver	Bronze
Team	W1	South Korea; Kim Ok-geum; Park Hong-jo	not awarded	not awarded
Team compound	Open	India; Sheetal Devi; Rakesh Kumar	China; Lin Yueshan; Ai Xinliang	Iran; Maryam Yavarpoor Shahrbabaki; Hadi Nori
Team recurve	Open	Iran; Zahra Nemati; Mohammad Reza Arab Ameri	China; Wu Chunyan; Zhao Lixue	Japan; Chika Shigesada; Tomohiro Ueyama

== Athletes ==
Source:
