= Archery at the 2024 Summer Paralympics – Men's individual W1 =

Archery, Men's W1 at the XVII Paralympic Games
- Venue: Les Invalides
- Dates: 29 - 31 August 2024
- Competitors: 13 from 11 nations

Medalists
1st place, gold medalist(s)		Jason Tabansky	United States
2nd place, silver medalist(s)		Han Guifei	China
3rd place, bronze medalist(s)		Zhang Tianxin	China

The men's individual W1 archery discipline at the 2024 Summer Paralympics will be contested from 29 to 31 August at Les Invalides, Paris.

In the ranking rounds each archer shoots 72 arrows, and is seeded according to score. In the knock-out stages each archer shoots three arrows per set against an opponent, the scores being aggregated. Losing semifinalists compete in a bronze medal match. As the field contained 13 archers, the three highest ranked archers will proceed directly to the quarter-final round; the remaining ten will enter in the Round of 16.

== Record ==
Records are:

World record	David Drahonínský (CZE)	680	Olbia, Italy	30 April 2019
Paralympic record	Nihat Türkmenoğlu (TUR)	661	Tokyo, Japan	27 August 2021

== Ranking round ==
The ranking round of the men's individual W1 event will be held on 29 August.

Rank	Archer	Nationality	10	X	Total	Note
1	Zhang Tianxin	China	33	17	674	PR Q
2	Bahattin Hekimoğlu	Turkey	24	7	661	Q
3	David Drahonínský	Czech Republic	27	9	657	Q
4	Tamás Gáspár	Hungary	25	12	655	q
5	Han Guifei	China	24	5	655	q
6	Jason Tabansky	United States	25	8	654	q
7	Paolo Tonon	Italy	24	10	652	q
8	Yiğit Caner Aydın	Turkey	19	7	640	q
9	Shaun Anderson	South Africa	16	6	638	q
10	Jean-Pierre Antonios	Finland	13	5	633	q
11	Eugênio Franco	Brazil	19	9	627	q
12	Park Hong-jo	South Korea	8	0	613	q
13	Damien Letulle	France	7	3	566	q

PR : Paralympic Games Record Q: Qualified direct to quarterfinals q : Qualified for Round of 16

== Knockout rounds ==
First round
9	Anderson (RSA)	133
8	Aydın (TUR)	132
5	Han (CHN)	140
12	Park (KOR)	130
13	Letulle (FRA)	119
4	Gáspár (HUN)	136
11	Franco (BRA)	122
6	Tabansky (USA)	137
7	Tonon (ITA)	132
10	Antonios (FIN)	130

Quarterfinals
1	Zhang (CHN)	136
9	Anderson (RSA)	134
5	Han (CHN)	137
4	Gáspár (HUN)	134
3	Drahonínský (CZE)	131
6	Tabansky (USA)	139
7	Tonon (ITA)	138
2	Hekimoğlu (TUR)	134

Semifinals
1	Zhang (CHN)	133
5	Han (CHN)	135
6	Tabansky (USA)	136
7	Tonon (ITA)	115

Finals
5	Han (CHN)	131
6	Tabansky (USA)	134
Bronze Medal Match
1	Zhang (CHN)	138
7	Tonon (ITA)	126
