= 2025 World Para Archery Championships – Visually impaired 2/3 =

Visually impaired 2/3 at the 2025 World Para Archery Championships
- Venue: Gwangju International Archery Center
- Location: Gwangju, South Korea
- Dates: 26–27 September

Medalists
| gold medal | Nicholas Thomas | Great Britain |
| silver medal | Kathleen Meurrens | Belgium |
| bronze medal | Mihai Bursuc | Romania |

The visually impaired 2/3 competition at the 2025 World Para Archery Championships, which took place from 26 to 27 September 2025 in Gwangju, South Korea. Three-time world champion Steve Prowse of Great Britain was the defending champion but did not compete. Nicholas Thomas of Great Britain won the gold medal and continued Britain's dominance in the event.

== Schedule ==
All times are in Korea Standard Time (UTC+09:00).

| Date | Time | Round |
|---|---|---|
| Thursday, 25 September | | Official practice |
| Friday, 26 September | 09:00 | Qualification round |
| Friday, 26 September | 13:10; 13:45 | Final Round; Quarter-finals; Semi-finals |
| Saturday, 27 September | 11:32; 11:52 | Final Round; Bronze-medal match Gold-medal match |

== Qualification Round ==
The qualification round was held on 26 September 2025.

High green denotes a bye in quarter-finals.
Light green denotes entering from quarter-finals.

| Rank | Name | Nation | Score | 10+X | X |
|---|---|---|---|---|---|
| 1 | Nicholas Thomas | Great Britain | 592 | 10 | 3 |
| 2 | Kathleen Meurrens | Belgium | 548 | 9 | 3 |
| 3 | Mihai Bursuc | Romania | 541 | 7 | 1 |
| 4 | Kim Sung-min | South Korea | 475 | 4 | 1 |
| 5 | Misael Ruiz | Mexico | 461 | 7 | 4 |
| 6 | Kollarek Sebastian | Germany | 387 | 3 | 1 |
| 7 | Choi Eun-joo | South Korea | 345 | 1 | 0 |

== Elimination round ==
The elimination and knockout rounds will take place from September 26 to 27, 2025.

Quarterfinals
5 | (Mexico) Misael Ruiz | 0
4 | (South Korea) Kim Sung-min | 6
3 | (Romania) Mihai Bursuc | 6
6 | (Germany) Kollarek Sebastian | 2
7 | (South Korea) Choi Eun-joo | 0
2 | (Belgium) Kathleen Meurrens | 6

Semifinals
1 | (United Kingdom) Nicholas Thomas | 7
4 | (South Korea) Kim Sung-min | 1
3 | (Romania) Mihai Bursuc | 2
2 | (Belgium) Kathleen Meurrens | 6

Finals
1 | (United Kingdom) Nicholas Thomas | 6
2 | (Belgium) Kathleen Meurrens | 4
Third place
4 | (South Korea) Kim Sung-min | 2
3 | (Romania) Mihai Bursuc | 6
