= Imalia Oktrininda =

Australian Paralympic archer (born 1979)

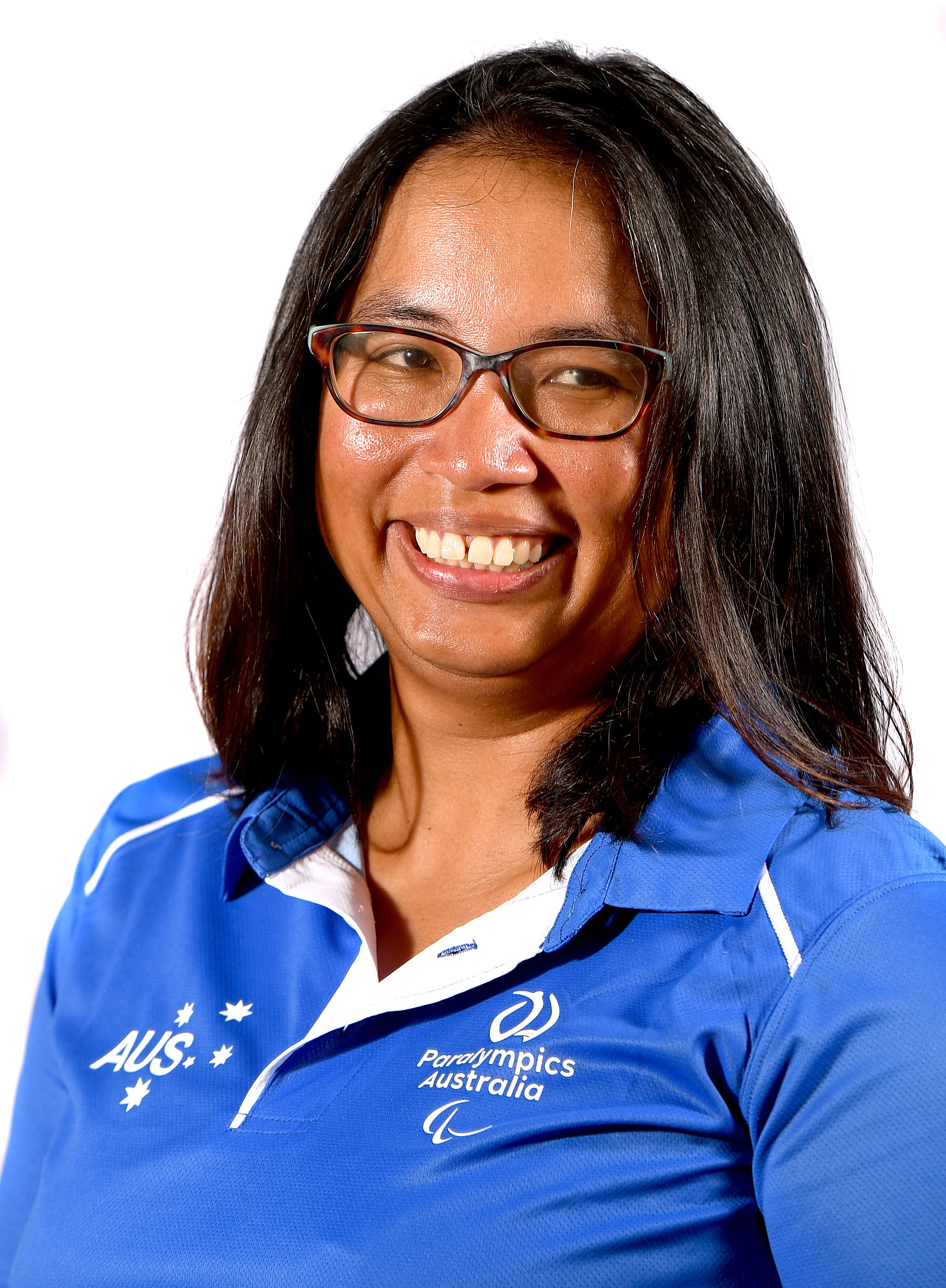
- Imalia Oktrininda in 2019

Personal information
- Nationality: Australia
- Born: 27 October 1979 (age 46)

Sport
- Sport: Archery

Imalia Oktrininda (born 27 October 1979) is an Australian paralympic archer. She represented Australia at the 2020 Summer Paralympics, in Women's individual recurve, and Mixed team recurve.

== Personal ==
Oktrininda was born on 27 October 1979 with spina bifida.

== Archery ==
Her para-archery classification is ARW2, or W2 for short

She competed at the 2019 Australian National Indoor Championships. She won the 2021 Australian Para & VI National Championships. She is ranked 32nd in the world.

In the 2020 Tokyo Paralympics, Oktrinidina advanced to the QuarterfinalsWomen's individual recurve. In the round of 32 she defeated Jang Moon Jo of the Republic of Korea 7–1 but was eliminated after losing in the round of 16 to Vincenza Petrilli of Italy 6–0.

In the Mixed team recurve Oktribinda partnered Taymon Kenton-Smith. In the round of 16 they were beaten by Poland 6–0.
