= Eric Bennett (archer) =

American Paralympic archer

Personal information
- Full name: Eric Christopher Bennett
- Nationality: American
- Born: November 4, 1973 (age 52) Phoenix, Arizona, United States
- Home town: Surprise, Arizona
- Education: Northern Arizona University

Sport
- Sport: Archery
- Event: Recurve
- Coached by: MJ Rogers
Medal record
Representing United States
World Para Archery Championships
Gold medal – first place	2015 Donaueschingen	Individual
Gold medal – first place	2019 's-Hertogenbosch	Team
Silver medal – second place	2019 's-Hertogenbosch	Individual
Parapan American Games
Gold medal – first place	2023 Santiago	Team
Silver medal – second place	2015 Toronto	Individual
Silver medal – second place	2023 Santiago	Individual

Eric Christopher Bennett (born November 4, 1973) is an American paralympic archer who competes in recurve archery. He is a five-time Paralympian, having represented the United States at the 2008, 2012, 2016, 2020, and 2024 Paralympic Games. Additionally he is a two-time World Para Archery Champion and a four-time U.S. national champion.

== Personal life ==
Bennett began learning archery at the age of 7. He lost his right arm above the elbow in a car accident caused by a drunk driver when he was 15 years old. Bennett learned to shoot with only one arm. He joined the U.S. national team in 2007, qualifying for his first Paralympics in Beijing the following year.

Bennett is the former physics teacher of Olympic archer Brady Ellison.

== Career ==
=== Paralympics ===
Bennett made his Paralympic debut at the 2008 Paralympic Games in Beijing. He lost to John Stubbs, who would go on to win the gold medal, in the round of 16. At the 2012 Paralympic Games Bennett made it all the way to the bronze medal match, ultimately losing to Mikhail Oyun.

In the summer of 2015, Bennett was selected to the U.S. archery team for the 2016 Rio de Janeiro Paralympics, making this his third Paralympics. He made it to the quarterfinals before losing to eventual silver-medalist Hanreuchai Netsiri. At the 2020 Paralympic Games Bennett lost in the round of 16 to Zhao Lixue who would go on to win the silver medal.
