= Han Guifei =

Chinese Paralympic archer

Medal record

Men's para-archery

Representing China

Paralympic Games
Silver medal – second place	2024 Paris	Individual W1

World Championships
Gold medal – first place	2023 Plzeň	Doubles W1

Asian Para Games
Gold medal – first place	2022 Hangzhou	Doubles W1
Silver medal – second place	2022 Hangzhou	Individual W1

Han Guifei (Chinese: 韩贵飞; pinyin: Hán Guìfēi; born 15 December 1986) is a Chinese Paralympic archer. He won silver in the individual W1 at the 2024 Summer Paralympics in Paris.
