= Zhang Tianxin (archer) =

Chinese Paralympic archer (born 1998)

Personal information
- Born: 10 September 1998 (age 27)

Sport
- Country: China
- Sport: Paralympic archery
Medal record
Paralympic Games
Gold medal – first place	2020 Tokyo	Mixed team W1
Gold medal – first place	2024 Paris	Mixed team W1
Bronze medal – third place	2024 Paris	Individual W1
World Championships
Gold medal – first place	2025 Gwangju	Individual W1
Gold medal – first place	2025 Gwangju	Doubles W1
Gold medal – first place	2025 Gwangju	Mixed Team W1
Asian Para Games
Gold medal – first place	2022 Hangzhou	Individual W1

Zhang Tianxin (Chinese: 张天鑫; pinyin: Zhāng Tiānxīn; born 10 September 1998) is a Chinese Paralympic archer. He won the gold medal in the mixed team W1 event at the 2020 Summer Paralympics held in Tokyo, Japan. He won the bronze medal in the men's individual W1 event at the 2024 Summer Paralympics held in Paris, France.
