= Bhutan at the Paralympics =

- Flag of Bhutan
- IPC code: BHU
- NPC: Bhutan Paralympic Committee
- Medals: Gold 0 Silver 0 Bronze 0 Total 0

Summer appearances
- 2020; 2024

Bhutan has competed twice at the Paralympic Games, debuting at the 2020 Summer Paralympics in Tokyo with three athletes. The country has taken part in every edition of the Summer Paralympics since then.

== Timeline ==
=== 2020 Summer Paralympics ===
Bhutan sent three athletes to the 2020 Summer Paralympics, these being Chimi Dema (Women's shotput), Gyeltshen (Men's shotput), and Pema Rigsel (Men's individual recurve archery. The flag-bearer for Bhutan was Chimi Dema. Though Bhutan did not win any medals at the event, all of the Bhutanese athletes reportedly broke their personal records in their respective events.

=== 2024 Summer Paralympics ===
Bhutan's sole athlete at the 2024 Summer Paralympics was Kinley Dem, who participated in the R2 Women's 10 metre air rifle standing SH1.

== Medal tables ==
=== Medals by Summer Games ===
Games	Athletes	Gold	Silver	Bronze	Total	Rank
2020 Tokyo	3	0	0	0	0	—
2024 Paris	1	0	0	0	0	—
Total		0	0	0	0	—

== See also ==
- Bhutan at the Olympics
