= Phoebe Paterson Pine =

British Paralympic archer (born 1997)

Phoebe Paterson Pine MBE
Personal information
- Born: 3 December 1997 (age 28) Siddington, Gloucestershire, England

Sport
- Country: Great Britain
- Sport: Paralympic archery
- Event: Compound bow W2
Medal record
Women's archery Compound bow W2
Representing Great Britain
Paralympic Games
| Gold medal – first place | 2020 Tokyo | Individual compound W2 |
World Championships
| Bronze medal – third place | 2025 Gwangju | Doubles |

Phoebe Paterson Pine (born 3 December 1997) is a British paralympian and archer. She won gold in the Women's individual compound open at the 2020 Summer Paralympics in Tokyo. She defeated Jessica Stretton, and Tatiana Andrievskaia, to advance to the final. She competed at the 2024 Paralympics in Paris.

== Career ==
Born in Siddington, Gloucestershire, Paterson Pine competed at the 2017 World Para Archery Championships, where she won a bronze medal.

Paterson Pine was appointed Member of the Order of the British Empire (MBE) in the 2022 New Year Honours for services to archery.

She won the bronze medal in her event at the 2022 World Para Archery Championships held in Dubai, United Arab Emirates.

She competed at the 2024 Paralympics in Paris where she was beaten into fourth place by her seven-month pregnant colleague Jodie Grinham.
