= Sarita Adhana =

Indian para athlete

Personal information
- Born: 1 January 1987 (age 39)
Medal record
Representing India
Women's Para-archery
World Championships
Silver medal – second place	2025 Gwangju	Doubles
Asian Para Games
Silver medal – second place	2022 Hangzhou	Doubles Compound

Sarita Adhana (born 1 January 1987) is an Indian paralympic archer. She qualified to represent India at the 2024 Summer Paralympics in Paris in the women's Individual compound event of Archery competitions. She lost in the quarterfinals at Paris Paralympics.

== Career ==
She represented India at the 2022 Asian Para Games held at Hangzhou, China. She won a bronze medal in the Women's compound archery open section of the Para Asian Archery Championship winning the all-Indian play-off for bronze defeating compatriot Jyoti Baliyan 139–135. She also won a silver medal in the team event along with Sheetal Devi, to whom she lost the semifinal in the individual event.

She trained for the 2023 Asian Games at Mata Vaishno Devi Shrine's sports complex at Katra.

In November 2023, she won a bronze medal at the Asian Para Archery Championships in Bangkok. Later, she qualified for the Paralympics at the same tournament.
