= Michael Lukow =

American Paralympic archer

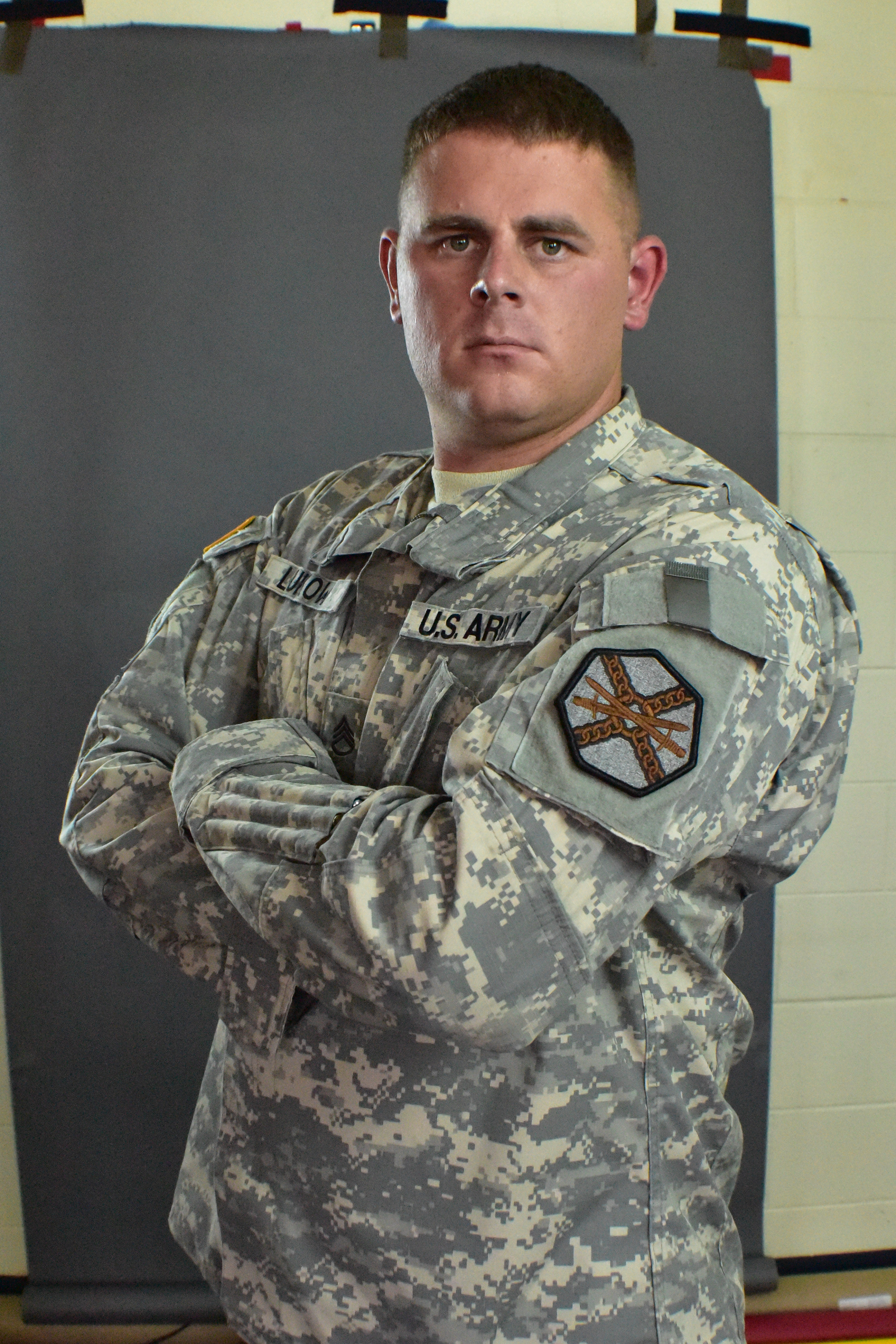
- Lukow in 2015

Personal information
- Full name: Michael Oris Lukow
- Born: 8 June 1986 (age 40) Alamosa, Colorado, U.S.
- Height: 6 ft 3 in (191 cm)

Sport
- Sport: Archery
- Event: Recurve
- Club: U.S. Army
Medal record
Representing the United States
Parapan American Games
Silver medal – second place	2011 Guadalajara	Recurve

Michael Lukow (born 8 June 1986) also known as the Blue Falcon, is an American soldier who competes as a Paralympic recurve archer.

== Early life ==
Lukow was born to Rikki and Bruce Lukow in Alamosa, Colorado, where he also grew up. He has three siblings: two older brothers and a younger sister. He attended Trinity Lutheran Preschool and Sangre De Cristo Elementary, Middle, and High School.

== Military and athletic career ==
In 2005 Lukow joined the U.S. Army and later was deployed to Iraq. On 30 January 2008 he lost his right foot and damaged his left foot in an IED explosion in Baghdad. Lukow was awarded the Iraq Campaign Medal, Purple Heart and National Defense Service Medal.

Lukow took up archery as a mental and physical aid to recover from injuries. He won silver medals at the 2011 Parapan American Games, Silver in team round at the 2017 World Championships in Beijing China, Gold in team round at the 2019 World Championships in the Netherlands, and 2014 Pan American Championships and placed 23rd in ranking round and tied 17th at the 2016 Paralympics.

== Personal life ==
Michael married Nikita Machesky after his 2008 injuries at Trinity Lutheran Church in Alamosa, Colorado. They have two kids.
