= Alicja Bukańska =

Polish archer

Personal information
- Born: 29 March 1958 (age 68) Dobiegniewo, Poland

Sport
- Sport: Para archery
- Disability: Heine Medina's disease
Medal record
Representing Poland
World Championships
Gold medal – first place	2003 Madrid	Recurve standing
Gold medal – first place	2007 Cheongju	Recurve standing
Silver medal – second place	2005 Massa Carrara	Recurve standing

Alicja Bukańska (born 29 March 1958) is a Polish former Paralympic archer who competed in international archery competitions. She is a two-time World champion and has competed at the 2004 and 2008 Summer Paralympics.

Bukańska was diagnosed with Heine Medina's disease, a disability that affects her balance.
