= Taymon Kenton-Smith =

Australian Paralympic archer (born 1994)

Taymon Kenton-Smith PLY
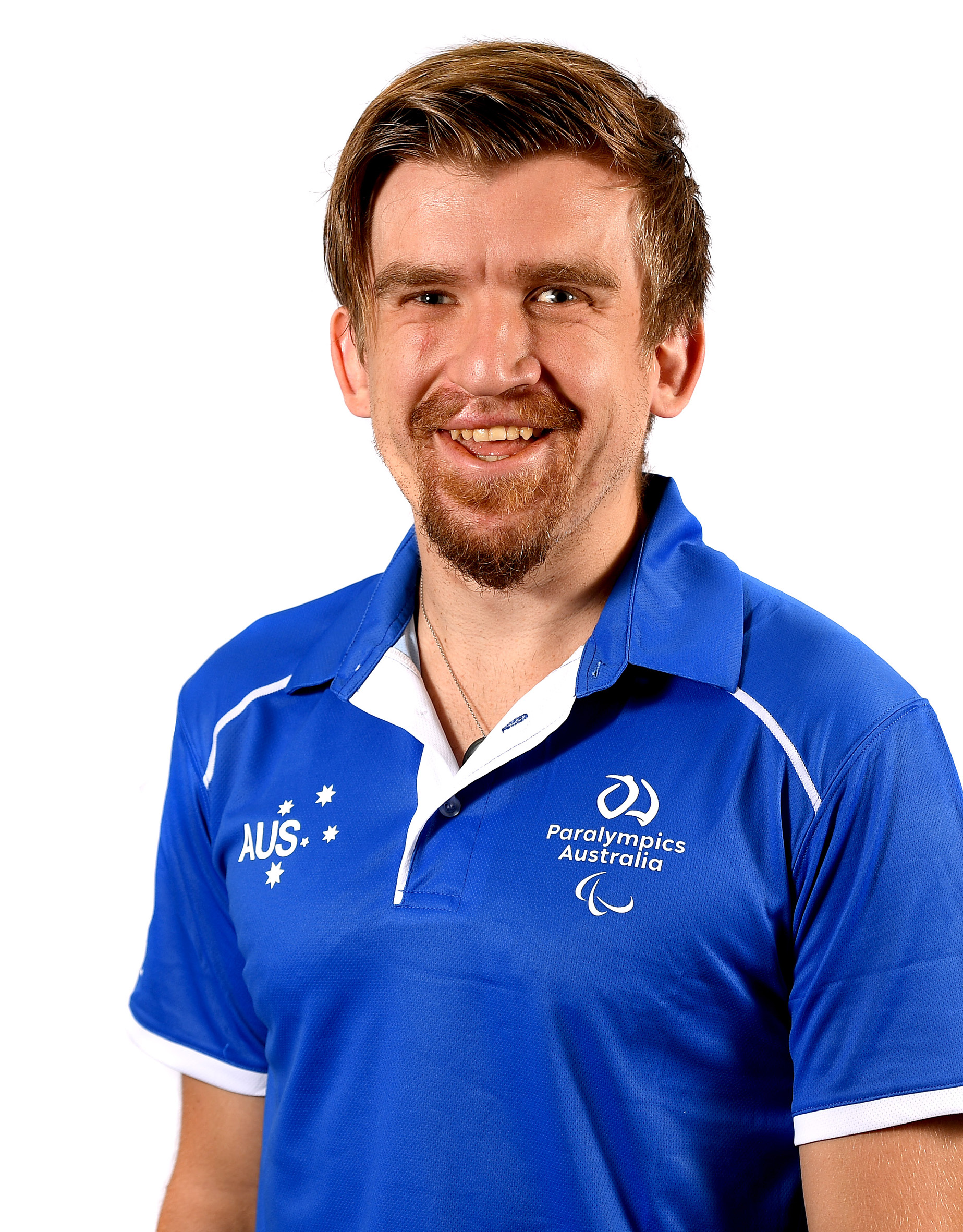
- Taymon Kenton-Smith in 2019

Personal information
- Nickname: Half-Hand
- Nationality: Australia
- Born: 6 September 1994 (age 31) Kingaroy, Queensland
- Height: 185 cm (6 ft 1 in)
- Weight: 89 kg (196 lb)

Sport
- Sport: Archery
- Disability class: Open Male Recurve
- Club: Samford Valley Target Archers and Mount Petrie Bowmen
- Coached by: Past Coaches; Alison Hagaman and Robert Turner; Current coaches - Ricci Cheah and Sarah Fuller

Taymon Kenton-Smith (born 6 September 1994) is an Australian Paralympic Recurve Archer. He represented Australia at the 2020 Summer Paralympics and the 2024 Paris Paralympics .

== Personal ==
Kenton-Smith was born on 6 September 1994. He was born without any fingers on his left hand. He designed the logo for his Facebook Archery page himself, along with the saying "Half the hand, Twice the effort", and is known by many around him to be very focused and driven when achieving goals.

Kenton-Smith completed a Bachelor of Arts at the University of Southern Queensland and Graduate Diploma in Education from the University of Queensland.

== Archery ==
He took up archery in 2001 when he was only 6 years of age. At 14 he made a promise to his grandmother to make it to the Paralympic Games. She wrote to Take 5 Magazine and with the money won in their "Wishing Well" competition he purchased a Recurve Bow. At Archery Australia’s 2021 Para & VI National Championships, he was third in the Para Open Male Recurve. He is a member of the Samford Valley Target Archers in Brisbane.

In 2020, the Australian Institute of Sport sports engineering section developed a custom grip for his left hand that had no fingers.

At the 2020 Tokyo Paralympics, in the Men's individual recurve he qualified 18th with a score of 604 out of a possible 720 but then lost to Eric Bennett of the USA in the Round of 32. He teamed with Imalia Oktrininda in the Mixed team recurve where they lost in the Round of 32 to Milena Olszewska of Poland.

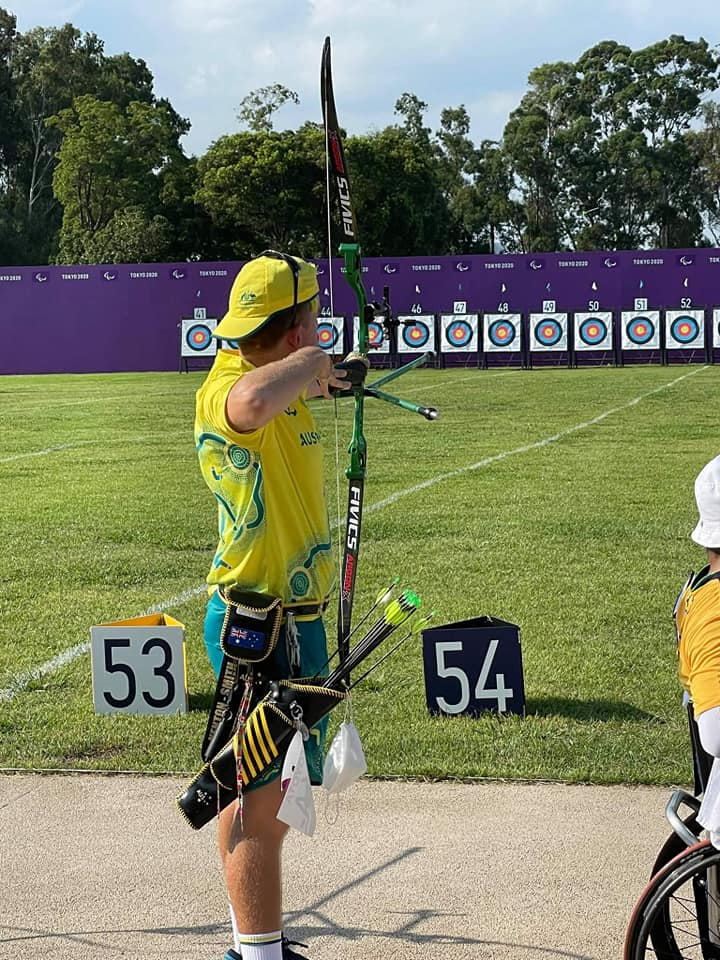
Taymon Kenton-Smith - Archer

At the 2024 Paris Paralympics, in the Men's individual recurve he qualified 21st with a score of 596 but then lost to Mohammad Reza Arab Amerii in the bronze medal match. He partnered with AJ Jennings, in the Mixed team recurve where they lost in the round of sixteen
