= Vivek Chikara =

Indian Paralympic archer (born 1990)

Personal information
- Nationality: Indian
- Born: 12 January 1990 (age 36) Meerut, Uttar Pradesh, India

Sport
- Country: India
- Sport: Archery
- Rank: 12
- Event: Men's Recurve Open

Achievements and titles
- Highest world ranking: 6
- Updated on 9 October 2021

Vivek Chikara (born 12 January 1990), also known as Chikara Vivek, is an Indian paralympic archer. He made his debut in 2020 Summer Paralympics, where he finished 10th in male individual recurve archery category. He also won gold medal in Asian Para Championship 2019 with an impressive 7–1 win over China's Sijun Wang and in 2023, He won silver medal at Asian Para Archery Championship in Thailand with his teammate Harvinder Singh in Recurve open Team Event.

== See also ==
- India at the 2020 Summer Paralympics
