= Harvinder Singh (archer) =

Indian Paralympic archer

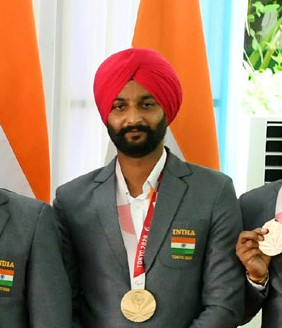
- Singh in 2021

Personal information
- Born: 25 February 1991 (age 35) Kaithal, Haryana, India
Medal record
Men's para archery
Representing India
Paralympic Games
Gold medal – first place	2024 Paris	Individual recurve open
Bronze medal – third place	2020 Tokyo	Individual recurve open
Asian Para Games
Gold medal – first place	2018 Jakarta	Individual recurve open W2/ST
Bronze medal – third place	2022 Hangzhou	Doubles recurve

Harvinder Singh (born 25 February 1991) is an Indian paralympic archer. He is a double Paralympic medalist having won the gold at 2024 Paris and the bronze at 2020 Tokyo in the men's singles recurve archery event. His medals were the first Paralympic gold and bronze archery medals for India.

In January 2025, Harvinder Singh was honored with the Padma Shri, India's fourth-highest civilian award, by the Government of India.

== Early life ==
Singh was born in Kaithal, Haryana. He is supported by sports NGO, Olympic Gold Quest.

== Career ==
Singh won the gold medal at the 2018 Asian Para Games and the bronze medal at the Tokyo 2020 Paralympics. At the 2022 Asian Para Games, he was a part of the team that won the bronze medal.

At the Para Archery World Ranking event in 2024, he won a bronze medal at Czech Republic. At the World Archery Oceania Para Grand Prix, he won a bronze at Australia.

== Awards ==
- Arjuna Award (2021)
- Padma Shri (2025)

== See also ==
- India at the 2020 Summer Paralympics
