= Ebrahim Ranjbar =

Iranian paralympic archer

Personal information
- Born: Ebrahim Ranjbarkivaj

Sport
- Country: Iran
- Sport: Archery
Medal record
Archery
Representing Iran
Paralympic Games
Bronze medal – third place	2016 Rio de Janeiro	Men's individual recurve open
Silver medal – second place	2016 Rio de Janeiro	Team recurve open
Asian Para Games
Gold medal – first place	2010 Guangzhou	Individual recurve W1/W2
Silver medal – second place	2010 Guangzhou	Team recurve

Ebrahim Ranjbarkivaj is an Iranian paralympic archer. He competed at the 2016 Summer Paralympics in the archery competition, being awarded the bronze medal in the men's individual recurve open event. He also competed in the mixed team recurve open event, being awarded the silver medal with his teammate Zahra Nemati. He had competed in archery events at the 2000 and 2012 Summer Paralympics, without winning a medal.
