= He Zihao =

Chinese Paralympic archer (born 1994)

Personal information
- Born: 30 May 1994 (age 32) Beijing, China

Sport
- Country: China
- Sport: Paralympic archery
Medal record
Men's compound para-archery
Paralympic Games
Gold medal – first place	2020 Tokyo	Men's Individual Compound - Open
Gold medal – first place	2020 Tokyo	Mixed Team Compound
Bronze medal – third place	2024 Paris	Men's Individual Compound Open
World Para Archery Championship
Gold medal – first place	2019 's-Hertogenbosch	Men's Individual Compound - Open
Gold medal – first place	2019 's-Hertogenbosch	Mixed Team Compound
Gold medal – first place	2023 Plzeň	Mixed Team Compound
Bronze medal – third place	2019 's-Hertogenbosch	Mixed Team Compound
Asian Para Games
Gold medal – first place	2022 Hangzhou	Men's Team Compound

He Zihao (born 30 May 1994) is a Chinese Paralympic archer.

== Career ==
He won the gold medal in the men's individual compound open event at the 2020 Summer Paralympics held in Tokyo, Japan. He also won the gold medal in the team compound open event.
