= Emma Rose Ravish =

American Paralympic archer (born 1999)

Emma Rose Ravish (born December 16, 1999) is an American Paralympic archer from Alva, Florida. She is the most successful recurve women open archer in U.S. history. She holds the 70m Para Recurve Open Female national record.

She represented the United States at the 2020 Summer Paralympics, making her the youngest American archer to compete at the Paralympics.

Ravish was born without legs due to complications in biological mother's pregnancy. Her Paralympic classification is W2. She qualified for the World Para Archery Championships at her first major national archery competition, 36 hours after getting her Paralympic classification. She was the 2019 USA Archery Target Nationals champion, and she won a silver medal at the 2021 Para Pan American Championships.
