= Margarita Sidorenko =

Russian Paralympic archer

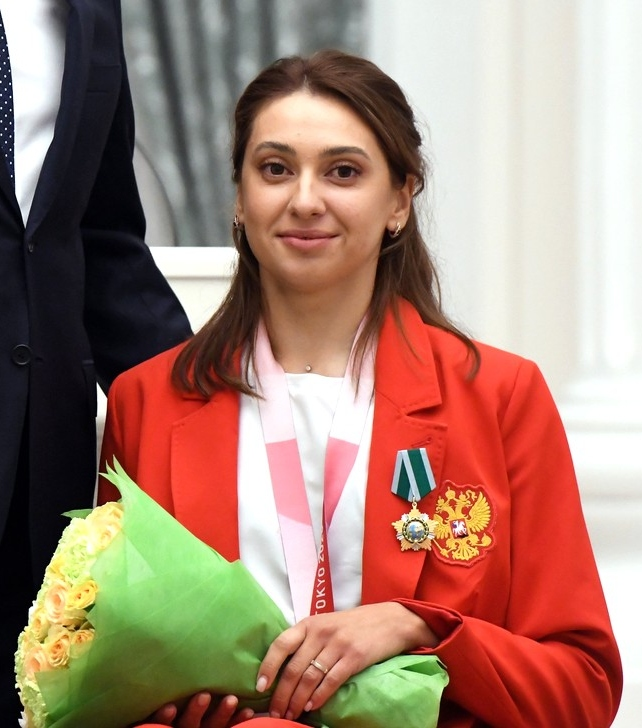
- Sidorenko in 2021

Personal information
- Nationality: Russian
- Born: 17 January 1988 (age 38)

Sport
- Sport: Archery
- Club: Krasnodar Regional Centre of Paralympic Preparation
- Coached by: Vitaly Andreev
Medal record
Archery
Representing RPC
Paralympic Games
Gold medal – first place	2020 Tokyo	Mixed team recurve

Margarita Sidorenko (Russian: Маргарита Сидоренко, born 17 January 1988) is a Russian Paralympic archer. She won a gold medal in the mixed team recurve event at the 2020 Summer Paralympics, together with Kirill Smirnov, and placed ninth individually. She won three silver medals in the team recurve at the 2015–2017 world championships.

Sidorenko has a degree in accounting from the Krasnoyarsk State Institute of Trade and Economics. She became disabled after a traffic accident that damaged her spinal cord. She took up archery in 2012.
