= Jean-Pierre Antonios =

Finnish-Kuwaiti Paralympic archer

Personal information
- Born: 30 January 1965 (age 61) Kuwait

Sport
- Country: Finland
- Sport: Para archery
Medal record
Para archery
Representing Finland
World Championships
Gold medal – first place	2013 Bangkok	Individual compound W1
Silver medal – second place	2005 Massa Carrara	Individual compound W1
Bronze medal – third place	2011 Turin	Individual compound W1
European Championships
Gold medal – first place	2010 Vichy	Individual compound W1
Gold medal – first place	2014 Nottwil	Individual compound W1

Jean-Pierre Antonios (born 30 January 1965 in Kuwait) is a Finnish-Kuwaiti Paralympic archer who competes at international archery competitions. He is a World champion and double European champion in the compound bow.

Antonios was a militant for the Lebanese Forces until the late 1980s then emigrated to Finland as an asylum seeker in 1990. He visited his home nation of Lebanon in 1997, on his way to the country, he contracted campylobacter which resulted in his central nervous system get destroyed and was diagnosed with Gullain Barré syndrome. He returned to Finland and was put on a ventilator for three months, he spent a total of thirteen months in the hospital and he used a wheelchair since then.

In 2000, he was granted Finnish citizenship and also took up archery then competed internationally in 2002. He has competed at four Paralympic Games, his highest achievement was in his debut Games at the 2004 Summer Paralympics and 2012 Summer Paralympics where he reached the quarterfinals in the individual compound.
