= Lin Yueshan =

Chinese Paralympic archer (born 1988)

Personal information
- Born: 19 October 1988 (age 37) Guangdong, China

Sport
- Sport: Archery
- Club: Cai Jianbing
Medal record
Representing China
Paralympic Games
Archery
Gold medal – first place	2020 Tokyo	Mixed team compound
Silver medal – second place	2016 Rio de Janeiro	Individual compound open
Asian Para Games
Gold medal – first place	2018 Jakarta	Individual compound W2/ST
Gold medal – first place	2022 Hangzhou	Doubles compound
Silver medal – second place	2022 Hangzhou	Team compound
Bronze medal – third place	2022 Hangzhou	Individual compound

Lin Yueshan (Chinese: 林月山; pinyin: Lín Yuèshān; born 19 October 1988) is a Chinese Paralympic archer.

== Career ==
In the 2016 Summer Paralympics, her debut games, Lin won her first medal which was silver.
