= Vincenza Petrilli =

Italian Paralympic archer

Personal information
- Nickname: Enza
- Born: 28 August 1990 (age 36) Taurianova, Italy

Sport
- Country: Italy
- Sport: Para archery
- Disability: Spinal Cord Injuries
- Disability class: Open
- Club: Fiamme Oro
- Coached by: Fabio Fuchsova
Medal record
Event	1st	2nd	3rd
Paralympic Games	0	1	0
2022 World Para Archery Championships	3	0	0

Vincenza "Enza" Petrilli (born 28 August 1990 in Taurianova) is an Italian paralympic archer who won a silver medal at the 2020 Summer Paralympics.

== Achievements ==
Year	Competition	Venue	Rank	Event	Performance
2021	Summer Paralympics	(Japan) Tokyo	2nd	Recurve open	Shoot off (5-6)
2022	World Para Archery Championships	(United Arab Emirates) Dubai	1st	Recurve open	Individual (7-3)
2022	World Para Archery Championships	(United Arab Emirates) Dubai	1st	Recurve open	Mixed Team (6-2)
2022	World Para Archery Championships	(United Arab Emirates) Dubai	1st	Recurve open	Double Women (5-3)
