= Kevin Mather (archer) =

American Paralympic archer

Personal information
- Born: August 25, 1982 (age 43) Santa Clarita, California, U.S.
- Years active: 2015–

Sport
- Sport: Paralympic archery
- Disability: Permanent paralysis due to spinal cord injury
- Disability class: W2 (Wheelchair)
- Event: Recurve bow

Achievements and titles
- World finals: World Para Archery Championship
Medal record
Men's archery Recurve bow W2
Representing United States
Paralympic Games
Gold medal – first place	2020 Tokyo	Individual recurve open
World Championship
Silver medal – second place	2017 Beijing	Team recurve open

Kevin Mather (born August 25, 1982) is an American Paralympic archer and former para-alpine skier. He won gold in the men's individual recurve open at the 2020 Summer Paralympics in Tokyo.
