= Hazel Chaisty =

British Paralympic archer

Hazel Chaisty is a British Paralympic archer.

== Career ==
Chaisty took up para-archery in 2014 after losing her leg. Soon after, she was part of the Team GB team that won bronze in the 2014 European Para-Archery Championships in Nottwil, Switzerland, in the Recurve Mixed event alongside David Phillips. She repeated the feat in the 2016 event in Saint-Jean-de-Monts, France, this time in the Recurve Women Open event. Despite this, she was not selected for the 2016 Summer Paralympics in Rio de Janeiro, but still attended as part of UK Sport's Paralympic Inspiration Programme.

In 2018, Chaisty won her third consecutive bronze medal in the European Para-Archery Championships in Plzen, Czechia, in the Mixed Recurve team event alongside Phillips. She was subsequently selected for the 2019 Fazza Para-Archery World Ranking Tournament in Dubai, where she won gold in the Recurve Women's Open. Later that year, in the 2019 World Para-Archery Championships in Den Bosch, Netherlands, she finished 16th. These results were enough to see her selected to represent Team GB in the 2020 Summer Paralympics in Tokyo.

== Personal life ==
Chaisty was born in Manchester, but lives in Hadfield, Derbyshire. She is coached by Charlotte Burgess.

Chaisty is a keen bee-keeper. Before losing her leg, she enjoyed scuba-diving.
