= Mohammad Reza Arab Ameri =

Iranian Paralympic archer (born 1997)

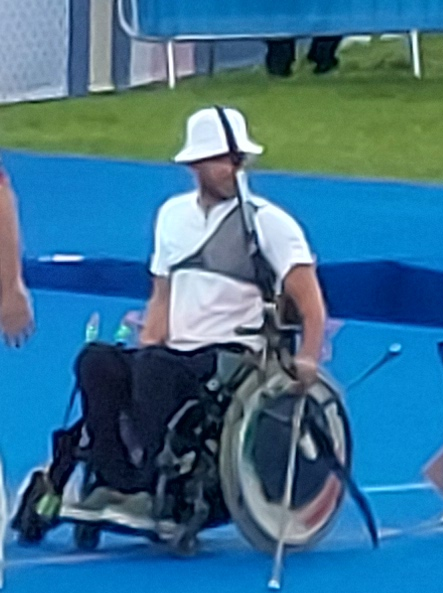
- Arab Ameri in 2024

Personal information
- Born: 16 January 1997 (age 29) Tehran

Sport
- Country: Iran
- Sport: Archery
Medal record
Men's para archery
Representing Iran
Paralympic Games
Bronze medal – third place	2024 Paris	Individual
World Para Archery Championship
Bronze medal – third place	2023 Plzeň	Individual
Bronze medal – third place	2023 Plzeň	Double Team
Asian Para Games
Gold medal – first place	2022 Hangzhou	Double Team
Gold medal – first place	2022 Hangzhou	Mixed Team
Islamic Solidarity Games
Gold medal – first place	2021 Konya	Individual
Silver medal – second place	2021 Konya	Mixed Team

Mohammad Reza Arab Ameri (Persian: محمدرضا عرب عامری; born 16 January 1997) is an Iranian archer. In 2024, he made his Summer Paralympics debut in Paris and won the bronze medal in the men's individual recurve open. He also set the world record of the individual recurve event during the 2022 Asian Para Games in Hangzhou.
