= Maik Szarszewski =

German Paralympic archer (born 1972)

Personal information
- Nationality: German
- Born: 14 May 1972 (age 54) Miltenberg, Germany

Sport
- Sport: Archery
- Event: Recurve
- Coached by: Mathias Nagel
Medal record
Representing Germany
European Para-Archery Championships
Silver medal – second place	2014 Nottwil	Mixed Recurve (Team)
Bronze medal – third place	2016 Saint-Jean-de-Monts	Men's Recurve Open

Maik Szarszewski (born 14 May 1972) is a German Paralympic archer.

He has competed three times at the Summer Paralympics, four times at the World Para Archery Championships and three times at the Para Continental Championships.
