= Wu Chunyan =

Chinese Paralympic archer (born 1989)

Personal information
- Born: 6 December 1989 (age 36) Xi'an, China

Sport
- Country: China
- Sport: Para-archery
Medal record
Women's recurve para-archery
Paralympic Games
Gold medal – first place	2016 Rio de Janeiro	Mixed team open
Gold medal – first place	2024 Paris	Individual open
Silver medal – second place	2016 Rio de Janeiro	Individual open
Bronze medal – third place	2020 Tokyo	Individual open
Bronze medal – third place	2020 Tokyo	Mixed team open
World Para-Archery Championships
Gold medal – first place	2025 Gwangju	Women's Individual Recurve open
Bronze medal – third place	2025 Gwangju	Women's Double Recurve open
Bronze medal – third place	2025 Gwangju	Mixed Double Recurve open
Asian Para Games
Gold medal – first place	2018 Jakarta	Individual recurve open
Gold medal – first place	2022 Hangzhou	Doubles recurve open
Silver medal – second place	2022 Hangzhou	Team recurve open
Bronze medal – third place	2014 Incheon	Individual recurve W1/W2
Bronze medal – third place	2018 Jakarta	Team recurve open
Bronze medal – third place	2022 Hangzhou	Individual recurve open

Wu Chunyan (Chinese: 吴春艳; pinyin: Wú Chūnyàn; born 6 December 1989) is a Chinese Paralympic archer. She represented China at the 2016 Summer Paralympics held in Rio de Janeiro, Brazil and she won two medals: the gold medal in the mixed team recurve open event and the silver medal in the women's individual recurve open event.

She won the bronze medal in the women's individual recurve open event at the 2020 Summer Paralympics in Tokyo, Japan. She also won the bronze medal in the mixed team recurve open event.
