= 2025 World Para Archery Championships =

15th edition of the World Para Archery Championships

- Location: Gwangju, South Korea
- Dates: 22–28 September 2025
- Competitors: 239 from 47 nations

The 2025 World Para Archery Championships was the 15th edition of the World Para Archery Championships. It took place from 22 to 28 September 2025 in Gwangju, South Korea. 239 athletes from 47 countries competed across seventeen events at the championships.

== Medals table ==
* Host nation (South Korea)

Rank	Nation	Gold	Silver	Bronze	Total
1	China	6	3	3	12
2	India	2	2	1	5
3	Mongolia	2	0	0	2
4	Turkey	1	3	0	4
5	South Korea*	1	1	4	6
6	Czech Republic	1	1	2	4
7	Italy	1	1	0	2
7	United States	1	1	0	2
9	Great Britain	1	0	4	5
10	Cyprus	1	0	0	1
11	Belgium	0	2	0	2
12	Individual Neutral Athletes	0	1	0	1
12	Slovakia	0	1	0	1
12	Spain	0	1	0	1
15	Australia	0	0	1	1
15	Romania	0	0	1	1
15	Thailand	0	0	1	1
Totals (17 entries)		17	17	17	51

== Medal summary ==
Event	Gold	Silver	Bronze
Compound Men Open	Toman Kumar; India	Rakesh Kumar; India	Nathan MacQueen; Great Britain
Compound Women Open	Sheetal Devi; India	Öznur Cüre; Turkey	Jodie Grinham; Great Britain
Compound Men Open Doubles	Kevin Polish; Ben Thompson; United States	Bao Yirui; Zhang Yicheng; China	Nathan MacQueen; Jamie Harris; Great Britain
Compound Women Open Doubles	Öznur Cüre; Büşra Ün; Turkey	Sheetal Devi; Sarita Adhana; India	Phoebe Paterson Pine; Jessica Stretton; Great Britain
Compound Open Mixed Team	Xu Xueqing; Zhang Yicheng; China	Öznur Cüre; Kenan Babaoğlu; Turkey	Sheetal Devi; Toman Kumar; India
Men W1	Zhang Tianxin; China	Jason Tabansky; United States	Park Hong-jo; South Korea
Women W1	Šárka Musilová; Slovakia	Isabel Fernández Jiménez; Spain	Tereza Brandtlová; Czech Republic
Men W1 Doubles	Li Pan; Zhang Tianxin; China	Yiğit Caner Aydın; Nihat Türkmenoğlu; Turkey	Park Hong-jo; Kim Hak-sun; South Korea
Women W1 Doubles	Kim Ok-geum; Lee Eun-hee; South Korea	Wang Liya; Cen Mengkan; China	Šárka Musilová; Tereza Brandtlová; Czech Republic
W1 Mixed Team	Zhang Tianxin; Wang Liya; China	David Drahonínský; Šárka Musilová; Czech Republic	Kim Ok-geum; Park Hong-jo; South Korea
Visually Impaired 1	Christos Misos; Cyprus	Ruben Vanhollebeke; Belgium	Craig Newbery; Australia
Visually Impaired 2/3	Nicholas Thomas; Great Britain	Kathleen Meurrens; Belgium	Mihai Bursuc; Romania
Recurve Men Open	Stefano Travisani; Italy	Anton Ziapaev; Individual Neutral Athletes	Hanreuchai Netsiri; Thailand
Recurve Women Open	Wu Chunyan; China	Gao Zihan; China	Wang Xueqian; China
Recurve Men Open Doubles	Zhao Lixue; Gan Jun; China	David Ivan; Denis Ivan; Slovakia	Lee Ji-hoon; Kim Jung-hoon; South Korea
Recurve Women Open Doubles	Selengee Demberel; Oyun-Erdene Buyanjargal; Mongolia	Kwon Ha-yeon; Lee Hwa-sook; South Korea	Wu Chunyan; Wang Xueqian; China
Recurve Open Mixed Team	Munkhbaatar Namjilmaa; Selengee Demberel; Mongolia	Elisabetta Mijno; Stefano Travisani; Italy	Zhao Lixue; Wu Chunyan; China

== Participants ==
A total of 237 archers from the national teams of the following 47 countries was registered to compete at 2025 World Para Archery Championship.

- Andorra (1)
- Australia (12)
- Bangladesh (2)
- Belgium (3)
- Brazil (6)
- Bulgaria (1)
- Canada (4)
- Chile (1)
- China (18)
- Colombia (1)
- Costa Rica (1)
- Cyprus (1)
- Czech Republic (5)
- Spain (1)
- Finland (2)
- France (2)
- Great Britain (9)
- Georgia (2)
- Germany (1)
- Greece (1)
- Guatemala (1)
- Hungary (1)
- Individual Neutral Athletes (11)
- Indonesia (7)
- India (15)
- Iran (3)
- Italy (11)
- Japan (4)
- Kazakhstan (6)
- South Korea (20)
- Latvia (3)
- Malaysia (4)
- Mexico (10)
- Mongolia (5)
- Netherlands (2)
- Peru (1)
- Poland (8)
- Romania (1)
- Singapore (1)
- Slovenia (2)
- Slovakia (6)
- Thailand (7)
- Chinese Taipei (6)
- Turkey (12)
- Ukraine (4)
- United States (10)
