= Łukasz Ciszek =

Polish Paralympic archer

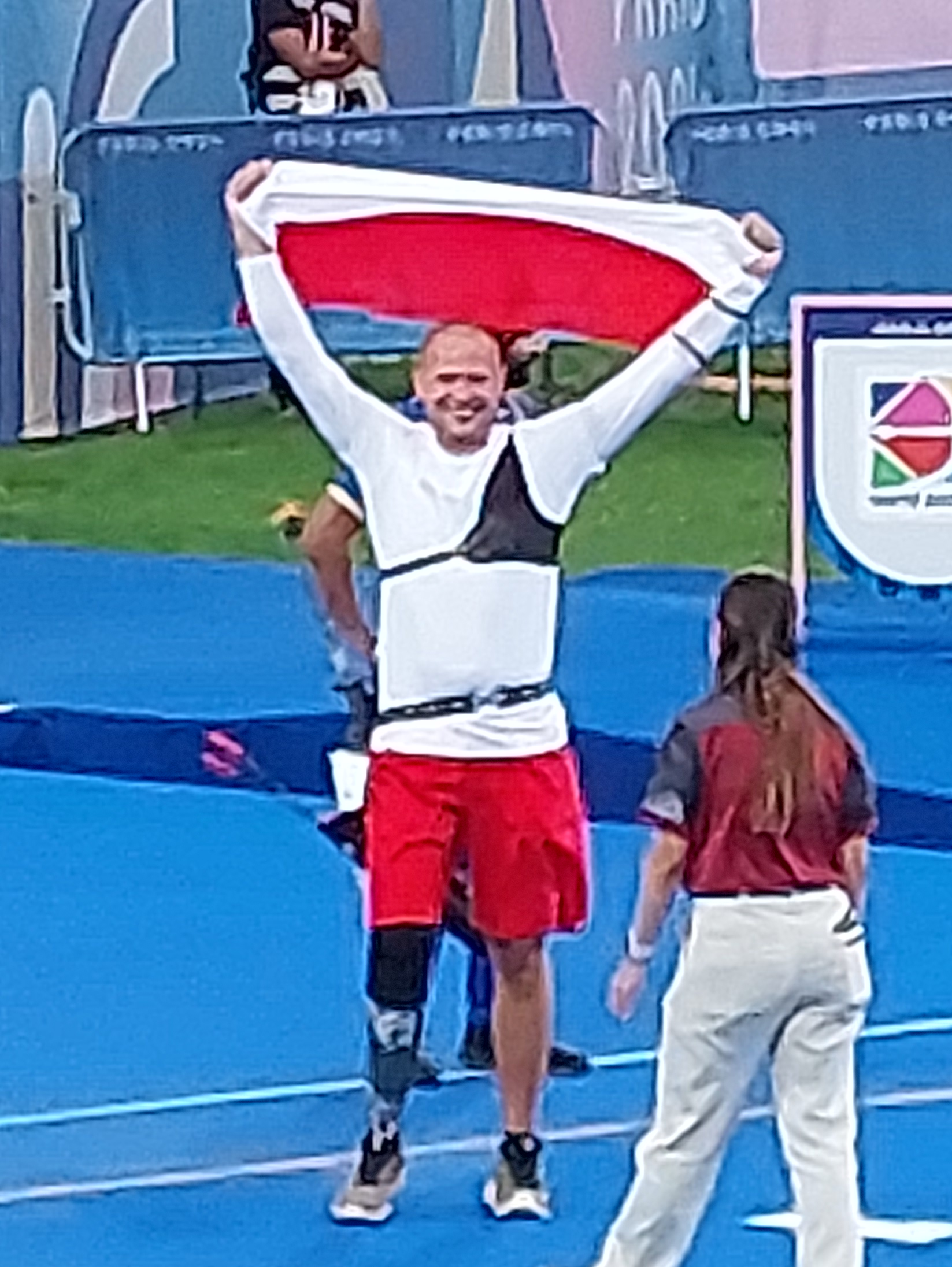
- Ciszek in 2024

Personal information
- Born: 7 March 1980 (age 46)

Sport
- Country: Poland
- Sport: Para archery
Medal record
Men's para archery
Representing Poland
Paralympic Games
Silver medal – second place	2024 Paris	Individual recurve open

Łukasz Ciszek (born 7 March 1980) is a Polish para archer. He competed at the 2020 Summer Paralympics and 2024 Summer Paralympics; in 2024, he won the silver medal in the men's individual recurve open.
