= Kirill Smirnov =

Russian Paralympic archer

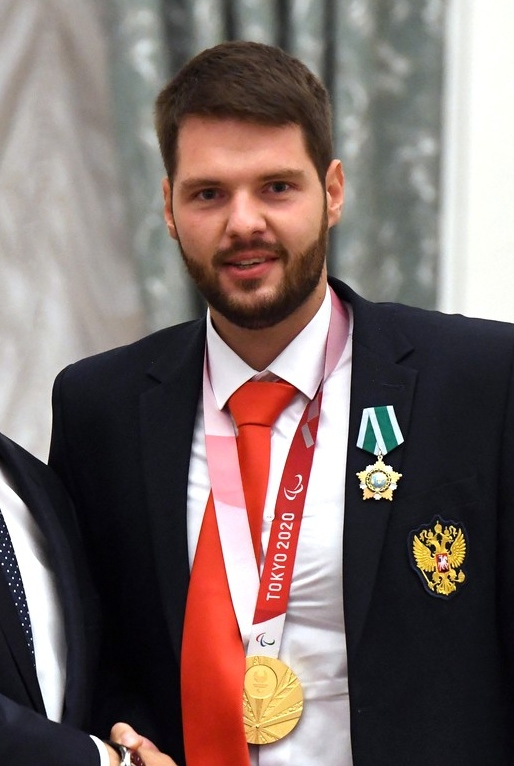
- Smirnov in 2021

Personal information
- Nationality: Russian
- Born: 2 April 1996 (age 30)

Sport
- Sport: Archery
- Coached by: Bair Anandaev
Medal record
Representing RPC
Paralympic Games
Archery
Gold medal – first place	2020 Tokyo	Mixed team recurve

Kirill Smirnov (Russian: Кирилл Смирнов, born 2 April 1996) is a Russian Paralympic archer. He won a gold medal in the mixed team recurve event at the 2020 Summer Paralympics, and placed fifth individually. He won another gold medal in the team recurve at the 2017 World Championships.

When he was 10 years old, Smirnov fell off a truck and lost his left leg. He first trained in equestrian before changing to archery in 2010.
