= Gholamreza Rahimi =

Iranian Paralympic archer (born 1978)

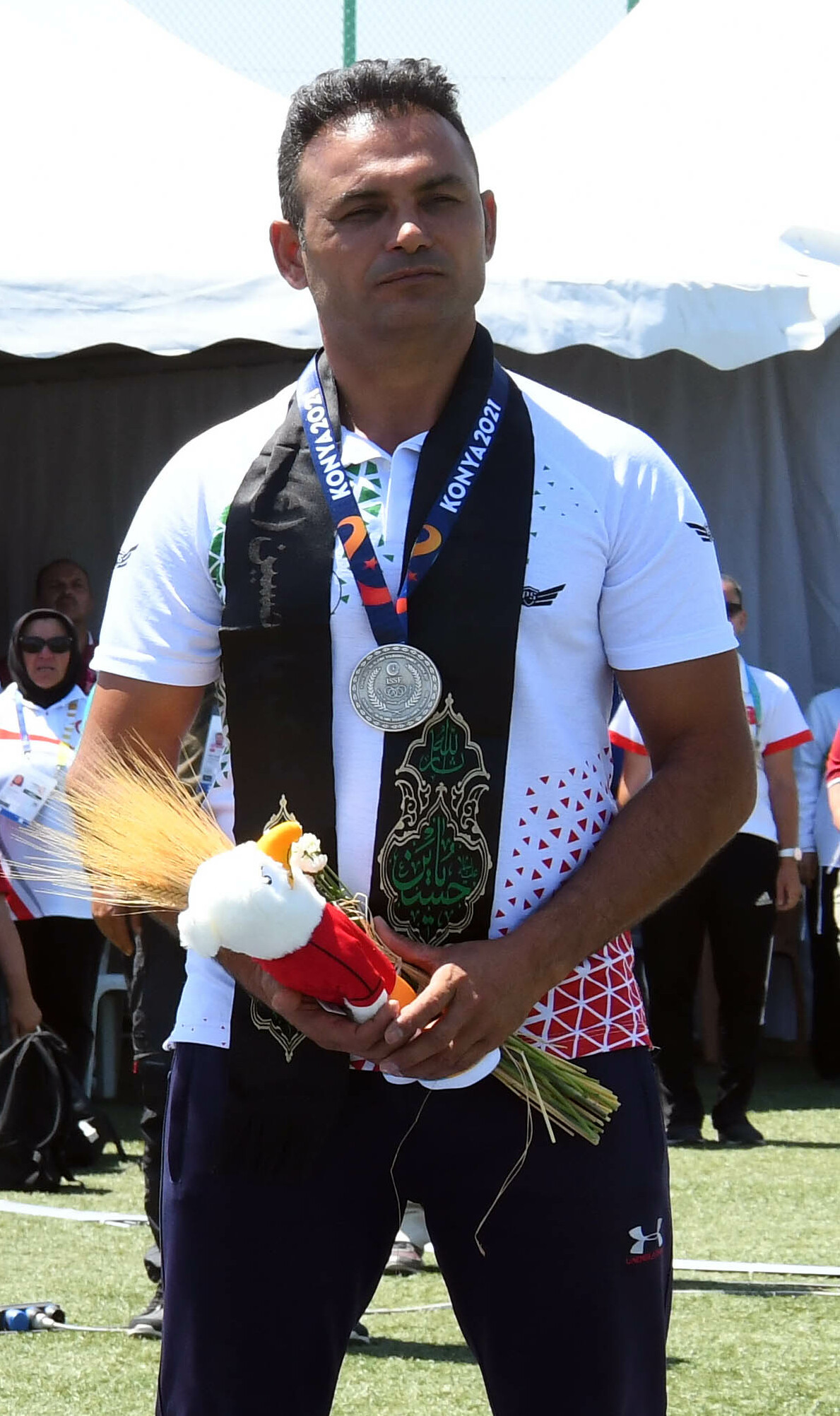
- Gholamreza Rahimi at the 2021 Islamic Solidarity Games

Personal information
- Nationality: Iranian
- Born: 23 July 1978 (age 48) Dezful, Iran

Sport
- Sport: Archery
Medal record
Representing Iran
Archery
Paralympic Games
Gold medal – first place	2016 Rio de Janeiro	Individual Recurve Open
Islamic Solidarity Games
Silver medal – second place	2021 Konya	Individual recurve open
Silver medal – second place	2021 Konya	Men's recurve team
Asian Para Games
Gold medal – first place	2018 Jakarta	Mixed team recurve
Gold medal – first place	2022 Hangzhou	Individual recurve open
Gold medal – first place	2022 Hangzhou	Doubles recurve open

Gholamreza Rahimi (born 23 July 1978) is an Iranian Paralympic archer.

In the 2016 Summer Paralympics, his debut games, Rahimi won his first Paralympic medal which was gold.
