= Tomohiro Ueyama =

Japanese Paralympic archer (born 1987)

Personal information
- Native name: 上山 友裕
- Nationality: Japanese
- Born: 28 August 1987 (age 38) Higashiōsaka, Japan

Sport
- Sport: Archery
- Event: Recurve
Medal record
Representing Japan
Asian Para Games
Silver medal – second place	2018 Jakarta	Team recurve
Silver medal – second place	2022 Hangzhou	Individual recurve
Bronze medal – third place	2022 Hangzhou	Team recurve

Tomohiro Ueyama (上山 友裕, Ueyama Tomohiro; born 28 August 1987) is a Japanese Paralympic archer from Higashiōsaka, Osaka Prefecture, Japan. He competes in the Recurve.

== Career ==
He has competed once at the Summer Paralympic Games and once at the World Para Archery Championships.
