= Stefano Travisani =

Italian Paralympic archer (born 1985)

Personal information
- Born: 16 September 1985 (age 41) Milan, Italy

Sport
- Country: Italy
- Sport: Para archery
- Club: G.S. Fiamme Azzurre
- Coached by: Guglielmo "Willy" Fuchsova
Medal record
Event	1st	2nd	3rd
Paralympic Games	1	1	0
Representing Italy
World Para-Archery Championships
Gold medal – first place	2025 Gwangju	Men's Individual Recurve open
Silver medal – second place	2025 Gwangju	Mixed Double Recurve open

Stefano Travisani (born 16 September 1985) is an Italian paralympic archer who won a silver medal at the 2020 Summer Paralympics.
