= Zhao Lixue =

Chinese Paralympic archer (born 1990)

Personal information
- Born: 7 November 1990 (age 35)

Sport
- Country: China
- Sport: Para-archery
Medal record
Men's recurve para-archery
Paralympic Games
Silver medal – second place	2020 Tokyo	Individual open
Bronze medal – third place	2020 Tokyo	Mixed team open
World Para-Archery Championships
Gold medal – first place	2025 Gwangju	Men's Double Recurve open
Bronze medal – third place	2025 Gwangju	Mixed Double Recurve open
Asian Para Games
Silver medal – second place	2022 Hangzhou	Doubles recurve
Silver medal – second place	2022 Hangzhou	Team recurve
Bronze medal – third place	2022 Hangzhou	Individual recurve

Zhao Lixue (born 7 November 1990) is a Chinese Paralympic archer.

== Career ==
He won the silver medal in the men's individual recurve open event at the 2020 Summer Paralympics held in Tokyo, Japan. He also won the bronze medal in the mixed team recurve open event.
