= Hanreuchai Netsiri =

Thai Paralympic archer (born 1979)

Personal information
- Nationality: Thai
- Born: 3 November 1979 (age 46) Sakon Nakhon Province, Thailand

Sport
- Sport: Archery
- Event: Recurve
- Coached by: Prayad Mookda-On
Medal record
Representing Thailand
Paralympic Games
Archery
Silver medal – second place	2016 Rio de Janeiro	Men's individual recurve open
World Para-Archery Championships
Gold medal – first place	2013 Bangkok	Recurve Men W2
Bronze medal – third place	2025 Gwangju	Men's Individual Recurve open

Hanreuchai Netsiri (Thai: หาญฤชัย เนตรศิริ; born 3 November 1979) is a Thai Paralympic archer.

In the 2016 Summer Paralympics, his debut games, Netsiri won his first Paralympic medal which was silver. He was the 2013 World Para-Archery Champion in Men's Recurve (W2).
