= Czech Republic at the 2020 Summer Paralympics =

- IPC code: CZE
- NPC: Czech Paralympic Committee
- Website: www.paralympic.cz

in Tokyo
- Competitors: 28 in 8 sports
- Medals: Gold 2 Silver 3 Bronze 3 Total 8

Summer Paralympics appearances (overview)
- 1996; 2000; 2004; 2008; 2012; 2016; 2020; 2024

Other related appearances
- Czechoslovakia (1972–1992)

The Czech Republic competed at the 2020 Summer Paralympics in Tokyo, Japan, from 24 August to 5 September 2021.

== Medalists ==
Medal	Name	Sport	Event	Date
Gold	David Drahonínský	Archery	Men's individual W1	30 August
Gold	Adam Peška	Boccia	Mixed individual BC3	1 September
Silver	Šárka Musilová; David Drahonínský	Archery	Mixed team W1	28 August
Silver	Šárka Musilová	Archery	Women's individual W1	1 September
Silver	Arnošt Petráček	Swimming	Men's 50 metre backstroke S4	3 September
Bronze	Aleš Kisý	Athletics	Men's shot put F53	29 August
Bronze	Petr Svatoš; Jiří Suchánek	Table tennis	Men's team – Class 3	1 September
Bronze	Anna Luxova	Athletics	Women's shot put F35	2 September

== Archery ==
Tereza Brandtlová, David Drahonínský, Václav Košťál and Šárka Musilová have all qualified to compete.

Athlete	Event	Ranking round		Round of 32	Round of 16	Quarterfinals	Semifinals	Final / BM	
Athlete	Event	Score	Seed	Opposition Score	Opposition Score	Opposition Score	Opposition Score	Opposition Score	Rank
David Drahonínský	Men's Individual W1	651	2	—N/a	Bye	Perilo (BRA); W 140–129	Zandi (IRI); W 139–131	Türkmenoğlu (TUR); W 142–141	1st place, gold medalist(s)
Václav Košťál	Men's Individual recurve	590	22	Ueyama (JPN); W 6–0	Kim (KOR); L 2–6	did not advance			
Tereza Brandtlová	Women's Individual W1	590	6	—N/a	Okazaki (JPN); L 115–126	did not advance			
Šárka Musilová	Women's Individual W1	589	7	—N/a	Krutova (RPC); W 128^{9}-128^{8}	Liu (CHN); W 128–124	Rumary (GBR); W 127–107	Chen (CHN); L 131–142	2nd place, silver medalist(s)
Šárka Musilová; David Drahonínský	Mixed team W1	1240	2	—N/a		Brazil (BRA); W 131–126	South Korea (KOR); W 141–126	China (CHN); L 132–138	2nd place, silver medalist(s)

== Athletics ==
Eva Datinská, Michal Enge, Tereza Jakschová, Aleš Kisý, Anna Luxová and František Serbus have all qualified to compete.

Men's field

Athlete	Event	Final	
Athlete	Event	Result	Rank
Michal Enge	Men's Club throw T51	26.75	7
Aleš Kisý	Men's Shot put F53	8.25	3rd place, bronze medalist(s)
František Serbus	Men's Club throw T32	32.53	7

Women's track

Athlete	Event	Heats		Final	
Athlete	Event	Result	Rank	Result	Rank
Tereza Jakschová	Women's 100 m T47	12.95	6	did not advance	
Tereza Jakschová	Women's 200 m T47	26.81	4	did not advance	
Anna Luxová	Women's 100 m T35	17.60	5	did not advance	

Women's field

Athlete	Event	Final	
Athlete	Event	Result	Rank
Eva Datinská	Women's Discus throw T37	11.18	5
Eva Datinská	Women's Shot put T38	21.31	9
Anna Luxová	Women's Shot put T35	8.60	3rd place, bronze medalist(s)

== Boccia ==
Kateřina Cuřínová and Adam Peška both qualified in individual BC1 & BC3 events respectively.

Athlete	Event	Group stage					Quarterfinal	Semifinal	Final / BM	
Athlete	Event	Opposition Score	Opposition Score	Opposition Score	Opposition Score	Rank	Opposition Score	Opposition Score	Opposition Score	Rank
Kateřina Cuřínová	Individual BC1	Joon (KOR); L 2–8	Huadpradit (THA); L 4–9	de Oliveira (BRA); W 3–1	Chew (MAS); L 0–11	4	did not advance			
Adam Peška	Individual BC3	Ntenta (GRE); W 3–2	van der Beken (FRA); W 5–0	Legostaev (RPC); W 3-3	—N/a	2 Q	Jeong (KOR); W 7–4	vMichel (AUS); W 4–3	Polychronidis (GRE); W 3-3	1st place, gold medalist(s)

== Cycling ==
Kateřina Antošová, Patrik Jahoda, Ivo Koblasa and Tomáš Mošnička have all qualified to compete.

=== Road ===
Men

Athlete	Event	Result	Rank
Patrik Jahoda	Time trial H1	52:56.13	4
Patrik Jahoda	Road race H1-2	DNF	
Ivo Koblasa	Time trial C2	38:23.17	8
Ivo Koblasa	Road race C1-3	2:21:21	19
Tomáš Mošnička	Time trial H3	49:33.46	15
Tomáš Mošnička	Road race H3	3:04:08	12

Women

Athlete	Event	Result	Rank
Kateřina Antošová	Time trial H1-3	35:39.64	5
Kateřina Antošová	Road race H1-4	59:37	6

=== Track ===
Athlete	Event	Heats		Final	
Athlete	Event	Result	Rank	Result	Rank
Ivo Koblasa	Men's Individual pursuit C2	3:48.914	7	did not advance	
Ivo Koblasa	Men's Time trial C1-3	—N/a		1:12.619	16

== Equestrian ==
Athlete	Horse	Event	Result	Rank
Anastasija Vištálová	Sterngreifer	Individual test grade I	66.964	13

== Shooting ==
Czech Republic entered two shooters into the Paralympic competition.

Athlete	Event	Qualification		Final	
Athlete	Event	Score	Rank	Score	Rank
Jakub Kosek	Men's P1 – 10 m air pistol SH1	533	27	did not advance	
Jakub Kosek	Mixed P3 – 25 m pistol SH1	544	24	did not advance	
Tomáš Pešek	Men's P1 – 10 m air pistol SH1	559	11	did not advance	
Tomáš Pešek	Mixed P3 – 25 m pistol SH1	did not start		did not advance	
Tomáš Pešek	Mixed P4 – 50 m pistol SH1	486	33	did not advance	

== Swimming ==
Six Czech swimmers have qualified to compete.

Men

Athlete	Event	Heats		Final	
Athlete	Event	Result	Rank	Result	Rank
Jonáš Kešnar	400 metre freestyle S9	4:33.76	13	did not advance	
Jonáš Kešnar	200 m individual medley S9	2:24.03	6 Q	2:23.00	5
Arnošt Petráček	50 m freestyle S4	40.64	7 Q	DSQ	
Arnošt Petráček	50 m backstroke S4	41.75	1 Q	41.26	2nd place, silver medalist(s)
Arnošt Petráček	50 m butterfly S5	41.41	14	did not advance	
Miroslav Smrčka	50 m backstroke S11	1:15.93	11	did not advance	
Miroslav Smrčka	50 m breaststroke SB11	1:28.29	11	did not advance	
Miroslav Smrčka	200 m individual medley SM11	2:54.35	12	did not advance	
Tadeáš Strašík	100 m breaststroke SB9	—N/a		1:13.19	7
Tadeáš Strašík	200 m individual medley SM10	2:24.00	7 Q	2:23.26	8

Women

Athlete	Event	Heats		Final	
Athlete	Event	Result	Rank	Result	Rank
Vendula Dušková	400 m freestyle S8	—N/a		5:20.71	6
Vendula Dušková	100 m breaststroke SB7	1:43.05	7 Q	1:42.69	7
Vendula Dušková	200 m individual medley SM8	3:06.56	6 Q	3:14.59	8
Dominika Míčková\	50 m backstroke SB4	1:11.84	15	did not advance	
Dominika Míčková\	50 m breaststroke SB3	1:13.46	11	did not advance	
Dominika Míčková\	150 m individual medley SM4	4:45.08	8	did not advance	

== Table tennis ==
Czech Republic entered one athletes into the table tennis competition at the games. Jiří Suchánek qualified via World Ranking allocation.

Men

Athlete	Event	Group Stage			Round of 16	Quarterfinals	Semifinals	Final	
Athlete	Event	Opposition Result	Opposition Result	Rank	Opposition Result	Opposition Result	Opposition Result	Opposition Result	Rank
Jiří Suchánek	Individual C2	Lamirault (FRA); L 1–3	Jakimczuk (POL); W 3–0	2 Q	Riapoš (SVK); W 3–2	Czuper (POL); L 1–3	did not advance		
Petr Svatoš	Individual C3	Zhai (CHN); L 0–3	Van Emburgh (USA); L 0–3	3	did not advance				
Filip Nachazel	Individual C4	Kim (KOR); L 1–3	Zylka (POL); L 0–3	3	did not advance				

== See also ==
- Czech Republic at the Paralympics
- Czech Republic at the 2020 Summer Olympics
