= 2022 World Para Archery Championships =

- Venue: Dubai Club for People of Determination.
- Location: Dubai, United Arab Emirates
- Dates: 19–27 February 2022
- Competitors: 212 from 40 nations

The 13th World Para Archery Championships took place in Dubai, United Arab Emirates from 19 to 27 February 2022. Originally the event was to take place in 2021 but it was delayed until 2022 by COVID-19 pandemic. It was the first time the switch to a two-archer doubles format rather than three-archer teams for the single-gender competitions. Athletes from China were unable to travel due to ongoing pandemic restrictions. This was the biggest parasport event in Dubai since the city hosted the World Para Athletics Championships in 2019.

== Schedule ==
Date	Compound Open	W1	Visually Impaired	Recurve Open
Tue, 22 February	Qualification; Elimination to 1/24			
Wed, 23 February	Eliminations ● Mixed teams ● Doubles ● Individuals			
Thu, 24 February		Qualification	Qualification	Qualification
Fri, 25 February	Medals matches ● Mixed teams ● Doubles ● Individuals	Eliminations ● Mixed teams ● Doubles	Eliminations ● Individuals	Elimination ● Mixed teams
Sat, 26 February		Medals matches ● Mixed teams ● Doubles ● Individuals	Medals matches ● Individuals	Elimination ● Doubles
Sun, 27 February				Eliminations ● Individuals; Medals matches ● Mixed teams ● Doubles ● Individuals

== Medalists ==
Event	Gold	Silver	Bronze
Compound Men Open	Matt Stutzman (USA)	Aleksandr Gombozhapov (RAF)	Bair Shigaev (RAF)
Compound Women Open	Tatiana Andrievskaia (RAF)	Maria Andrea Virgilio (ITA)	Phoebe Paterson Pine (GBR)
Compound Men Open Doubles	Ramezan Biabani (IRI); Hadi Nori (IRI)	Jonathon Milne (AUS); Garry Robinson (AUS)	Martin Dorič (SVK); Marcel Pavlík (SVK)
Compound Women Open Doubles	Öznur Cüre (TUR); Sevgi Yorulmaz (TUR)	Tatiana Andrievskaia (RAF); Anastasia Dzhioeva (RAF)	Farzaneh Asgari (IRI); Maryam Yavarpoor Shahrbabaki (IRI)
Compound Open Mixed Team	Tatiana Andrievskaia (RAF); Bair Shigaev (RAF)	Jyoti (IND); Shyam Sundar Swami (IND)	Jessica Stretton (GBR); Jamie Harris (GBR)
Men W1	Yiğit Caner Aydın (TUR)	Nihat Türkmenoğlu (TUR)	David Drahonínský (CZE)
Women W1	Lisa Coryell (USA)	Nil Mısır (TUR)	Elena Krutova (RAF)
Men W1 Doubles	Yiğit Caner Aydın (TUR); Nihat Türkmenoğlu (TUR)	Aleksei Leonov (RAF); Denis Ten (RAF)	Karel Davídek (CZE); David Drahonínský (CZE)
Women W1 Doubles	Anna Ilina (RAF); Elena Krutova (RAF)	Fatma Danabaş (TUR); Nil Mısır (TUR)	Not awarded
W1 Mixed Team	Elena Krutova (RAF); Aleksei Leonov (RAF)	Asia Pellizzari (ITA); Salvatore Demetrico (ITA)	Tereza Brandtlová (CZE); David Drahonínský (CZE)
Visually Impaired 1	Ruben Vanhollebeke (BEL)	Tanveer Ahmed (PAK)	Daniele Piran (ITA)
Recurve Men Open	Tomohiro Ueyama (JPN)	Guillaume Toucoullet (FRA)	Park Jun-beom (KOR)
Recurve Women Open	Vincenza Petrilli (ITA)	Pooja Jatyan (IND)	Milena Olszewska (POL)
Recurve Men Open Doubles	Gholamreza Rahimi (IRI); Asghar Zareeinejad (IRI)	David Phillips (GBR); Cameron Radigan (GBR)	Kirill Smirnov (RAF); Anton Ziapaev (RAF)
Recurve Women Open Doubles	Veronica Floreno (ITA); Vincenza Petrilli (ITA)	Svetlana Barantseva (RAF); Margarita Sidorenko (RAF)	Javkhlantugs Baatar (MGL); Selengee Demberel (MGL)
Recurve Open Mixed Team	Vincenza Petrilli (ITA); Stefano Travisani (ITA)	Pattawaeo Phattharaphon (THA); Hanreuchai Netsiri (THA)	Milena Olszewska (POL); Łukasz Ciszek (POL)

== Participants ==
A total of 212 archers from the national teams of the following 40 countries was registered to compete at 2022 World Para Archery Championship.

- Algeria (1)
- Andorra (1)
- Australia (7)
- Austria (1)
- Belgium (2)
- Brazil (6)
- Canada (3)
- Chile (1)
- Costa Rica (1)
- Czech Republic (5)
- Spain (6)
- Finland (2)
- France (5)
- Great Britain (12)
- Greece (1)
- Hungary (1)
- India (9)
- Iran (9)
- Iraq (4)
- Iceland (1)
- Italy (16)
- Japan (7)
- Kazakhstan (10)
- South Korea (8)
- Latvia (1)
- Mexico (1)
- Mongolia (4)
- Norway (1)
- Pakistan (3)
- Poland (5)
- Russian Archery Federation (16)
- Romania (5)
- Singapore (1)
- Slovenia (1)
- Slovakia (4)
- Thailand (11)
- Turkey (15)
- United Arab Emirates (3)
- Ukraine (10)
- United States (12)

== Medals table ==
* Host nation (United Arab Emirates)

Rank	Nation	Gold	Silver	Bronze	Total
1	RAF	4	4	3	11
2	Turkey	3	3	0	6
3	Italy	3	2	1	6
4	Iran	2	0	1	3
5	United States	2	0	0	2
6	Belgium	1	0	0	1
6	Japan	1	0	0	1
8	India	0	2	0	2
9	Great Britain	0	1	2	3
10	Australia	0	1	0	1
10	France	0	1	0	1
10	Pakistan	0	1	0	1
10	Thailand	0	1	0	1
14	Czech Republic	0	0	3	3
15	Poland	0	0	2	2
16	Mongolia	0	0	1	1
16	Slovakia	0	0	1	1
16	South Korea	0	0	1	1
Totals (18 entries)		16	16	15	47
