= Archery at the 2021 Islamic Solidarity Games =

Islamic Solidarity Games

- Venue: Saraçoğlu Sport Complex
- Location: Turkey, Konya
- Dates: 14–18 August 2022
- Competitors: 215 from 27 nations

Archery at the 2021 Islamic Solidarity Games was held in Konya, Turkey from 14 to 18 August 2022. Traditional Turkish Archery Competitions was held at Saraçoglu Sports Venue between 15 and 16 August 2022. For individual competitions, qualification, elimination and final elimination round shots was done, and for team competitions, elimination and final elimination rounds of the teams was done. Qualification rounds in Archery was made accordingly: Men’s and Women’s Recurve bow was 70m. 720 rounds, and Men’s and Women’s Compound bow was 50m. 720 Rounds. Para Archery competitions was held in Saraçoğlu Sport Complex between 09-13 August 2022. Competitions were held in Recurve Bow, Compound Bow and W1 Bows was held in Senior category. The qualification rounds of the competition was done as 720 rounds 70 m for Recurve bows, and 720 rounds 50 m for Compound Bows. Individual elimination and final rounds was done in each category after qualification rounds.

Archery at the 2021 Islamic Solidarity Games
Men	Recurve	Compound
Women	Recurve	Compound
Team	Men's recurve
Team	Women's recurve
Mixed team	Recurve

== Medal table ==
* Host nation (Turkey)

Rank	Nation	Gold	Silver	Bronze	Total
1	Turkey (TUR)*	6	3	3	12
2	Malaysia (MAS)	2	0	1	3
3	Indonesia (INA)	1	4	1	6
4	Iran (IRI)	1	2	1	4
5	Bangladesh (BAN)	0	1	2	3
6	Uzbekistan (UZB)	0	0	1	1
Totals (6 entries)		10	10	9	29

=== Medal table ===
* Host nation (Turkey)

Rank	Nation	Gold	Silver	Bronze	Total
1	Turkey (TUR)*	10	7	6	23
2	Iran (IRI)	6	7	4	17
3	Malaysia (MAS)	2	4	2	8
4	Kyrgyzstan (KGZ)	1	0	4	5
5	Bangladesh (BAN)	0	1	2	3
6	Azerbaijan (AZE)	0	0	2	2
6	United Arab Emirates (UAE)	0	0	2	2
8	Uzbekistan (UZB)	0	0	1	1
Totals (8 entries)		19	19	23	61

=== Recurve ===
Event	Gold	Silver	Bronze
Men's individual	Samet Ak; Turkey	Arif Dwi Pangestu; Indonesia	Mete Gazoz; Turkey
Women's individual	Yasemin Anagöz; Turkey	Gülnaz Büşranur Coşkun; Turkey	Rezza Octavia; Indonesia
Men's team	Turkey; Mete Gazoz; Samet Ak; Muhammed Yıldırmış	Indonesia; Arif Dwi Pangestu; Alviyanto Prastyadi; Riau Ega Agatha	Bangladesh; Md Sagor Islam; Mohammad Hakim Ahmed Rubel; Ruman Shana
Women's team	Turkey; Yasemin Anagöz; Gülnaz Büşranur Coşkun; Aslı Er	Indonesia; Pande Putu Gina Putri Arista; Asiefa Nur Haenza; Rezza Octavia	Bangladesh; Nasrin Akter; Beauty Ray; Diya Siddique
Mixed Team	Indonesia; Riau Ega Agatha; Rezza Octavia	Turkey; Yasemin Anagöz; Mete Gazoz	Uzbekistan; Abdusattorova Ziyodakhon; Amirkhon Sadykov

=== Compound ===
Event	Gold	Silver	Bronze
Men's individual	Mohd Juwaidi Mazuki; Malaysia	Mohammadsaleh Palizban; Iran	Emircan Haney; Turkey
Women's individual	Geesa Bybordy; Iran	Yeşim Bostan; Turkey	Ayşe Bera Süzer; Turkey
Men's team	Malaysia; Eugenius Loh Foh Soon; Alang Ariff Aqil Ghazalli; Mohd Juwaidi Mazuki	Indonesia; Deki Adika Hastian; Hendika Pratama Putra; Prima Wisnu Wardhana	Iran; Amir Kazempour; Mohammad Madandar; Mohammadsaleh Palizban
Women's team	Turkey; Yeşim Bostan; Ayşe Bera Süzer; Sevim Yıldır	Bangladesh; Roksana Akter; Shamoli Ray; Puspita Zaman	Not awarded
Mixed Team	Turkey; Yeşim Bostan; Emircan Haney	Iran; Geesa Bybordy; Amir Kazempour	Malaysia; Nur Aina Yasmine Halim; Mohd Juwaidi Mazuki

== Traditional Turkish archery ==
=== Medalists ===
==== Men ====
Event	Gold	Silver	Bronze
Limitless flight	Hüseyin Çalışkan; Turkey	İbrahim Balaban; Turkey	Fatih Yıldız; Turkey
Puta target	Yntymak Muradil Uulu; Kyrgyzstan	Ikram Mazlan; Malaysia	Oğuz Okçu; Turkey
Puta target team	Malaysia; Mustaqqim Rosman; Ikram Mazlan; Zulqarnain Murat	Turkey; Oğuz Okçu; Hayati Akkaya; Bayram Koçak	None awarded

==== Women ====
Event	Gold	Silver	Bronze
Limitless flight	Fatma Ayvacı; Turkey	Şebnem Saliha Çakıroğlu; Turkey	Nagihan Tunç; Turkey
Puta target	Aysun Demirci; Turkey	Sena Keçeci; Turkey	Dayang Ferazlyn; Malaysia
Puta target team	Turkey; Aysun Demirci; Fulya Erilli; Sena Keçeci	Malaysia; Dayang Ferazlyn; Rusnani Ismail; Faizah Ahmad	Kyrgyzstan; Asel Sadyrova; Nazgul Shapieva; Sedep Torogeldieva

=== Medal table ===
Rank	Nation	Gold	Silver	Bronze	Total
1	Turkey (TUR)	4	4	3	11
2	Malaysia (MAS)	1	2	1	4
3	Kyrgyzstan (KGZ)	1	0	1	2
Totals (3 entries)		6	6	5	17

== Para Archery ==
=== Medal table ===
* Host nation (Turkey)

Rank	Nation	Gold	Silver	Bronze	Total
1	Turkey (TUR)*	6	6	2	14
2	Iran (IRI)	5	5	3	13
3	Azerbaijan (AZE)	0	0	2	2
3	United Arab Emirates (UAE)	0	0	2	2
Totals (4 entries)		11	11	9	31

=== Recurve Bow ===
Event	Gold	Silver	Bronze
Men's individual	Mohammad Reza Ameri; Iran	Gholamreza Rahimi; Iran	Asghar Zareeinejad; Iran
Women's individual	Merve Nur Eroğlu; Turkey	Somayeh Ghahderijani; Iran	Yağmur Şengül; Turkey
Men's W1 Open	Yiğit Caner Aydın; Turkey	Bahattin Hekimoğlu; Turkey	Nihat Türkmenoğlu; Turkey
Women's W1 Open	Nil Mısır; Turkey	Fatma Danabaş; Turkey	Not awarded
Men's team	Turkey; Yavuz Papağan; Sadık Savaş	Iran; Gholamreza Rahimi; Asghar Zareeinejad	Azerbaijan; Jahan Musayev; Ali Nabiyev
Mixed Team	Turkey; Merve Nur Eroğlu; Yavuz Papağan	Iran; Somayeh Ghahderijani; Mohammad Reza Ameri	Azerbaijan; Azada Abdullayeva; Jahan Musayev

=== Compound Bow ===
Event	Gold	Silver	Bronze
Men's individual	Hadi Nori; Iran	Erdoğan Aygan; Turkey	Alisina Manshaezadeh; Iran
Women's individual	Öznur Cüre; Turkey	Farzaneh Asgari; Iran	Maryam Shahrbabaki; Iran
Men's team	Iran; Alisina Manshaezadeh; Hadi Nori	Turkey; Bülent Korkmaz; Murat Turan	United Arab Emirates; Habib Alblooshi; Mohammed Alshehhi
Women's team	Iran; Farzaneh Asgari; Maryam Yavarpour	Turkey; Öznur Cüre; Sevgi Yorulmaz	Not awarded
Mixed Team	Iran; Maryam Yavarpour; Ramezan Biabani	Turkey; Sevgi Yorulmaz; Bülent Korkmaz	United Arab Emirates; Haifa Alnaqbi; Habib Alblooshi

== Participating nations ==
=== Archery ===
139 archers from 26 countries:

1. Azerbaijan (6)
2. Bangladesh (12)
3. United Arab Emirates (4)
4. Chad (8)
5. Ivory Coast (1)
6. Guinea (2)
7. Indonesia (10)
8. Iran (10)
9. Kuwait (5)
10. Kyrgyzstan (6)
11. Malaysia (10)
12. Pakistan (5)
13. Palestine (1)
14. Qatar (7)
15. Saudi Arabia (6)
16. Sierra Leone (3)
17. Sudan (3)
18. Syria (1)
19. Tajikistan (4)
20. Tunisia (2)
21. Turkey (12)
22. Turkmenistan (1)
23. Uganda (2)
24. United Arab Emirates (6)
25. Uzbekistan (6)
26. Yemen (6)

=== Traditional Turkish archery ===
A total of 46 athletes from 9 nations competed in Traditional Turkish archery at the 2021 Islamic Solidarity Games:

- Chad (2)
- Ivory Coast (1)
- Kyrgyzstan (6)
- Malaysia (8)
- Pakistan (3)
- Sudan (3)
- Turkmenistan (3)
- Turkey (16)
- Uzbekistan (4)

=== Para Archery ===
47 archer from 7 countries:

1. Algeria (1)
2. United Arab Emirates (4)
3. Azerbaijan (5)
4. Indonesia (8)
5. Iran (11)
6. Uzbekistan (1)
7. Turkey (15)

== Gallery ==
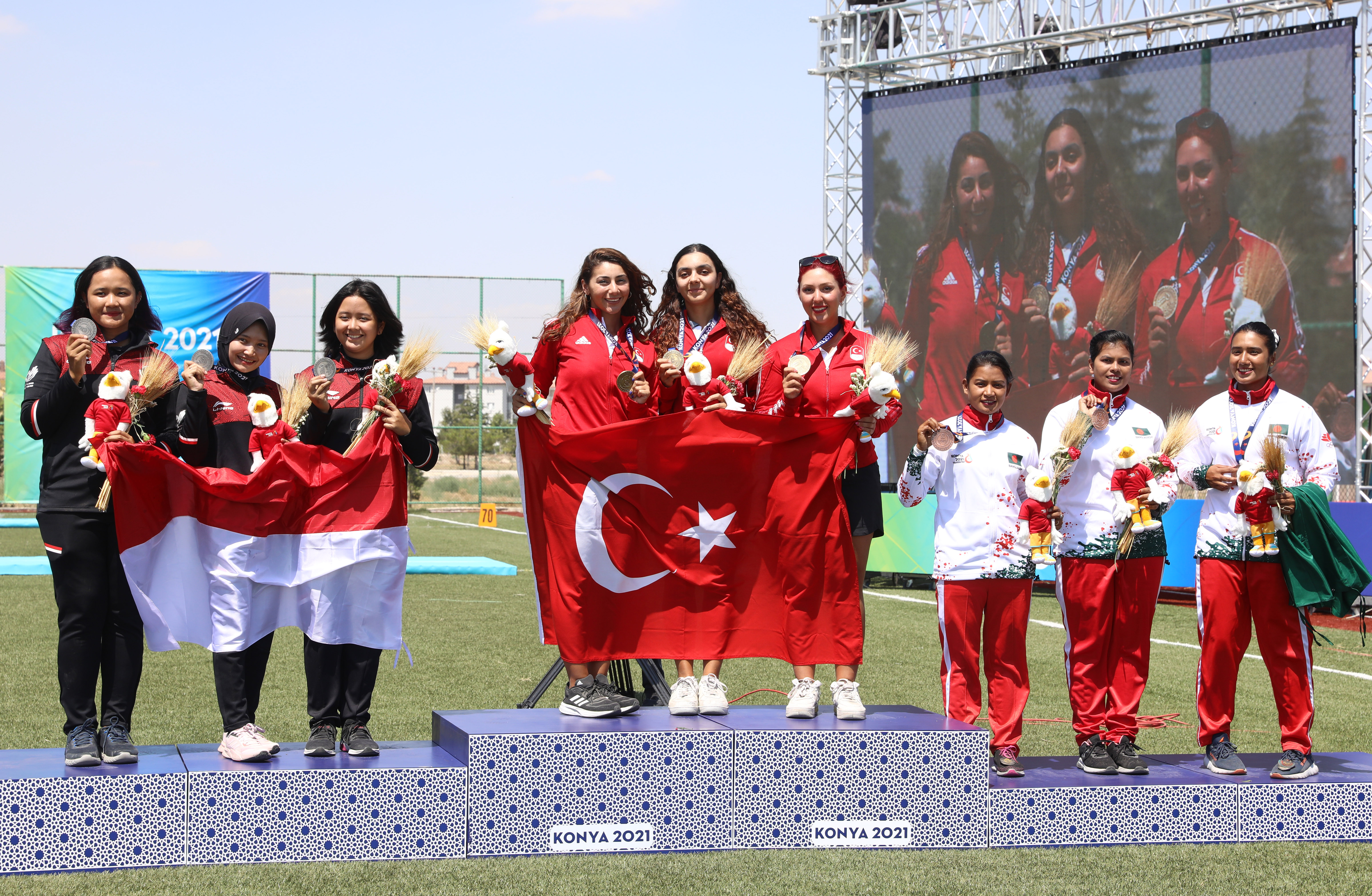
Recurve women team medal ceremony

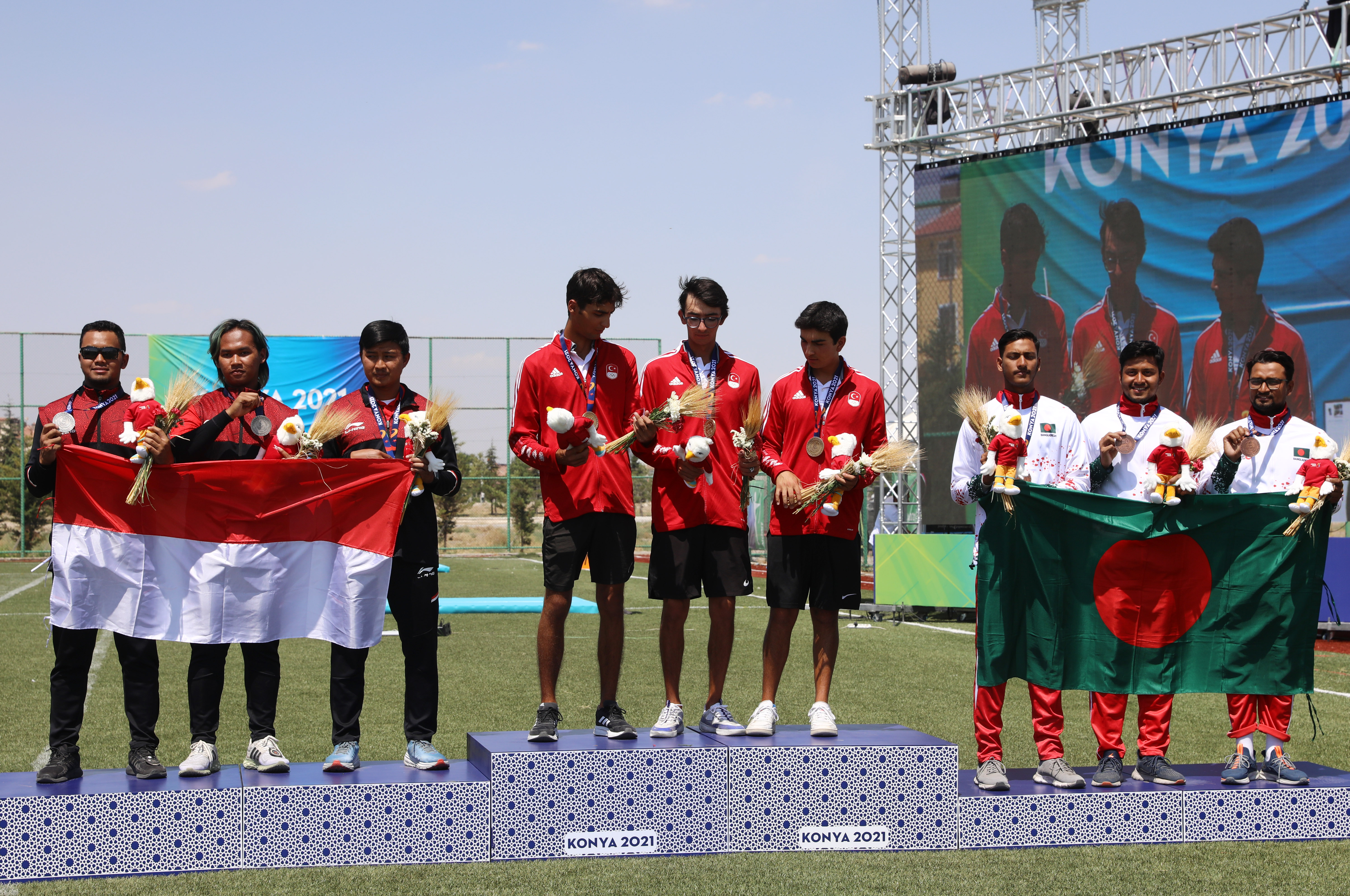
Recurve men team medal ceremony

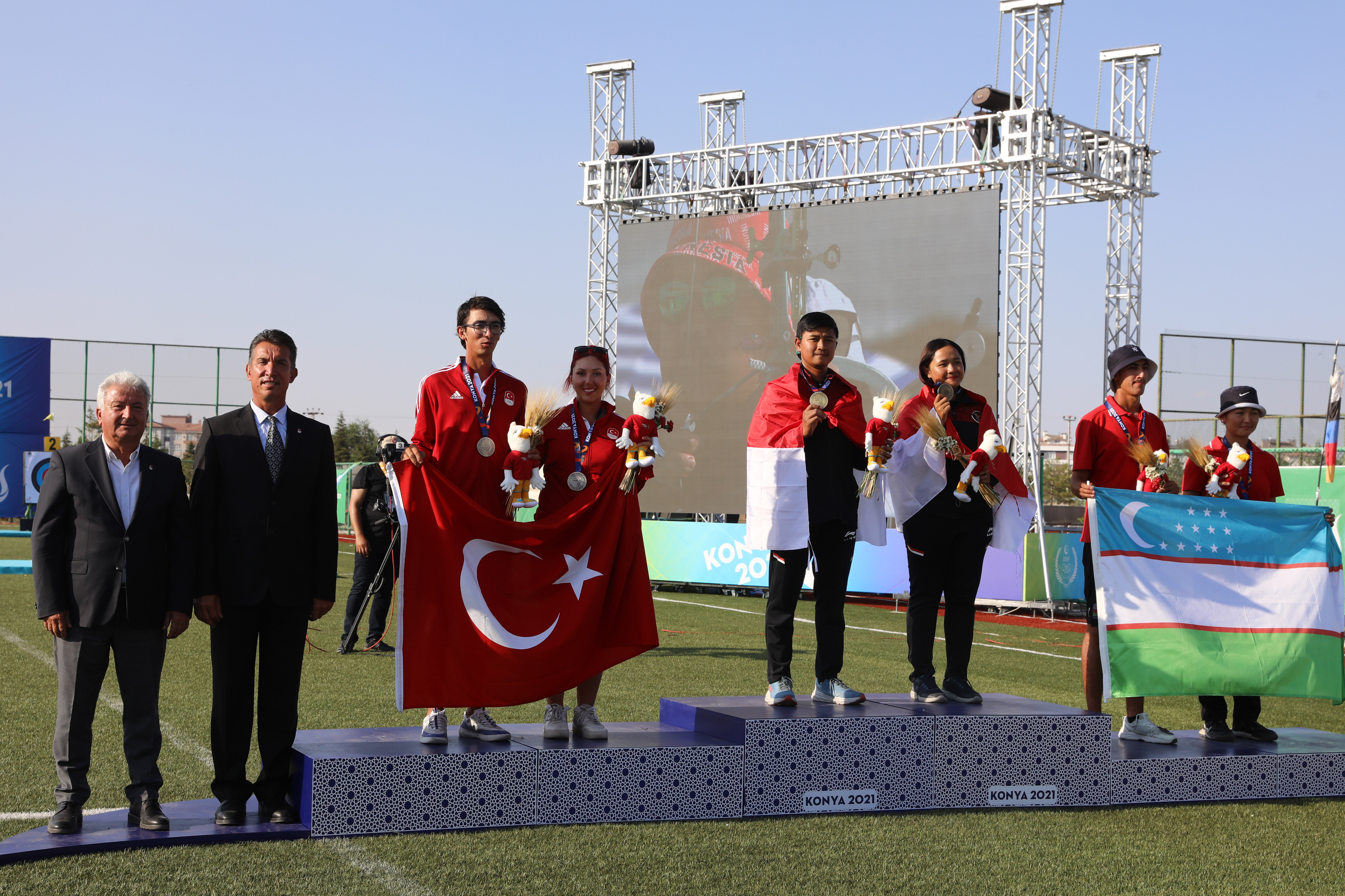
Recurve mixed team medal ceremony

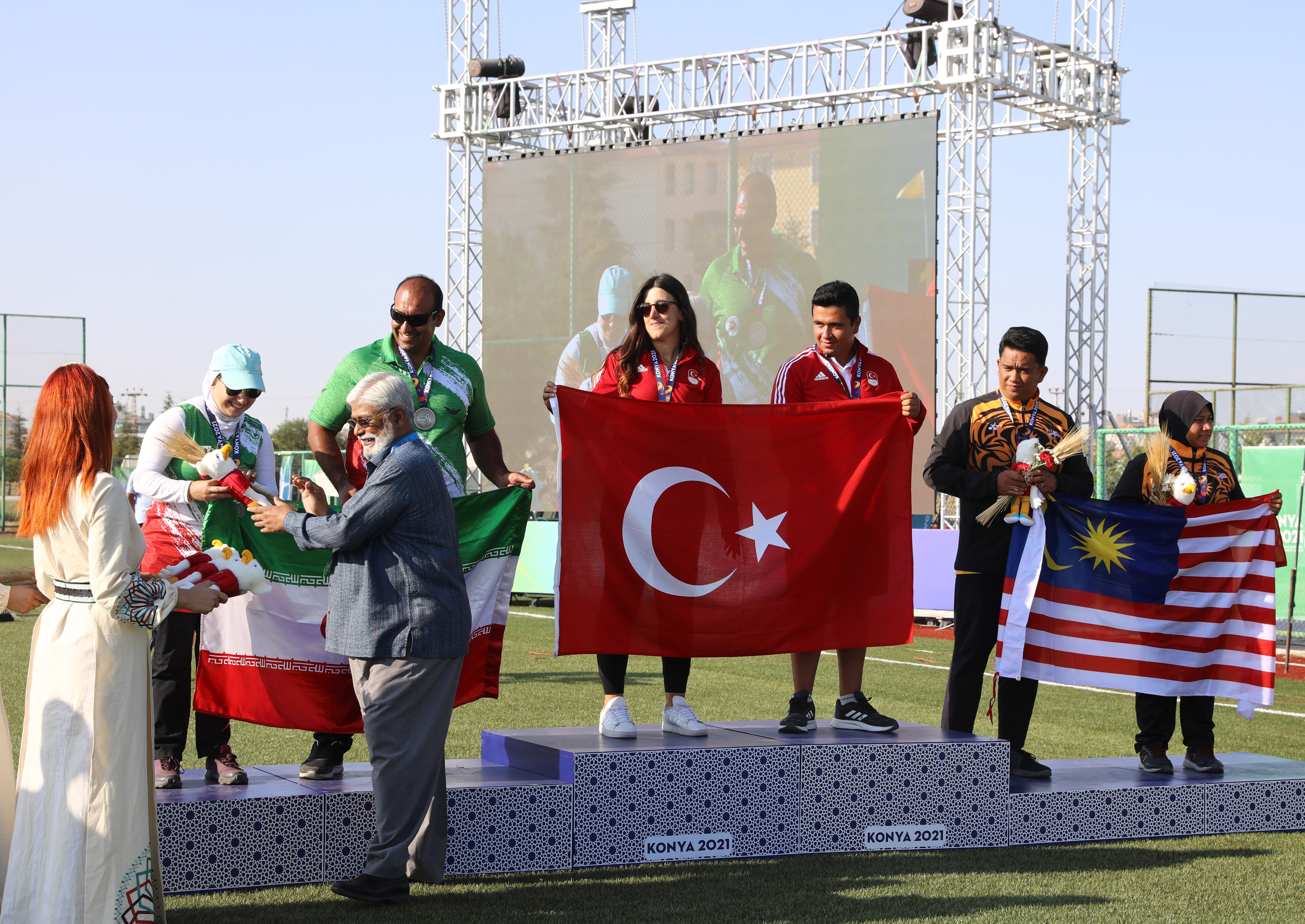
Compound mixed team medal ceremony

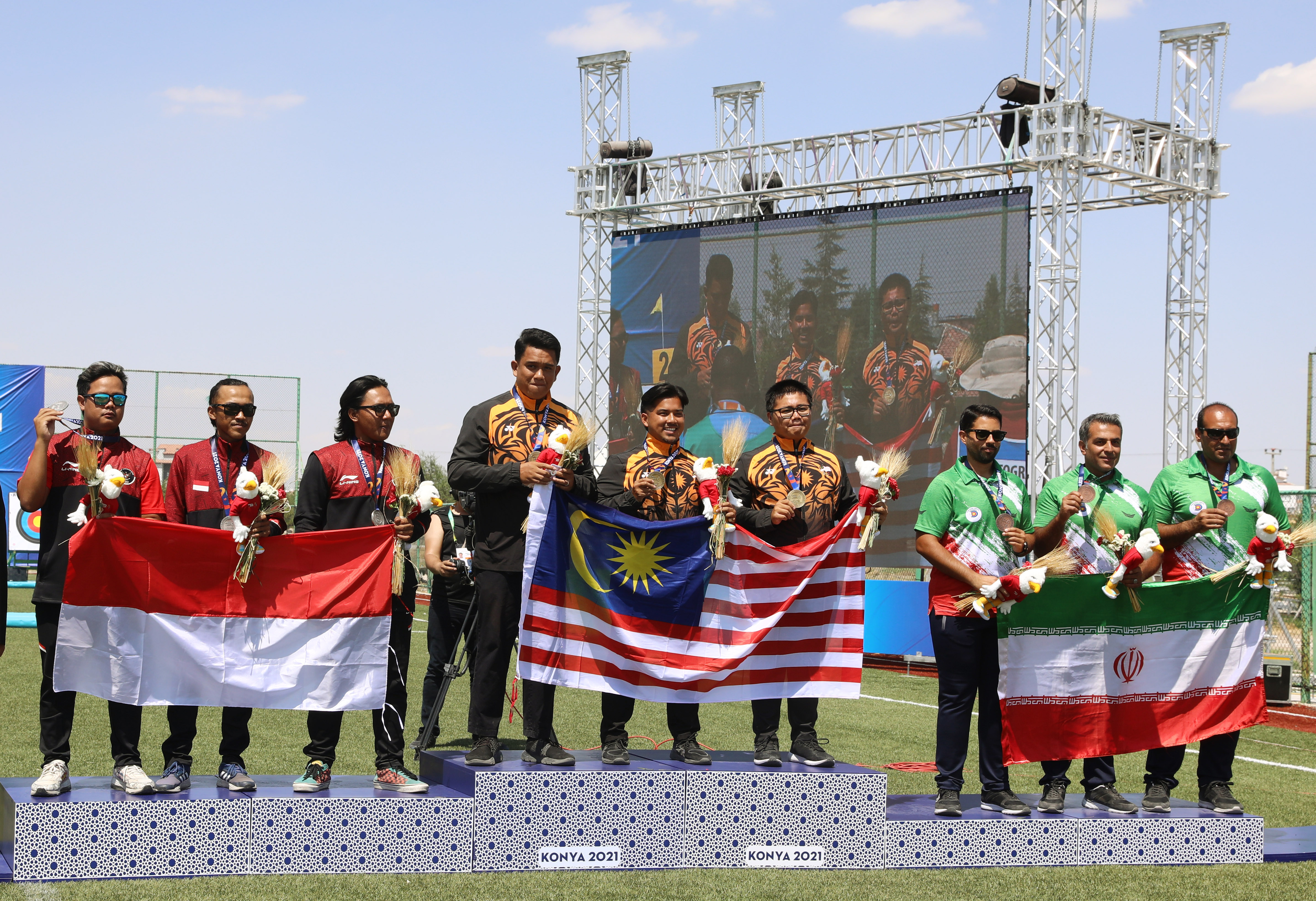
Compound men team medal ceremony

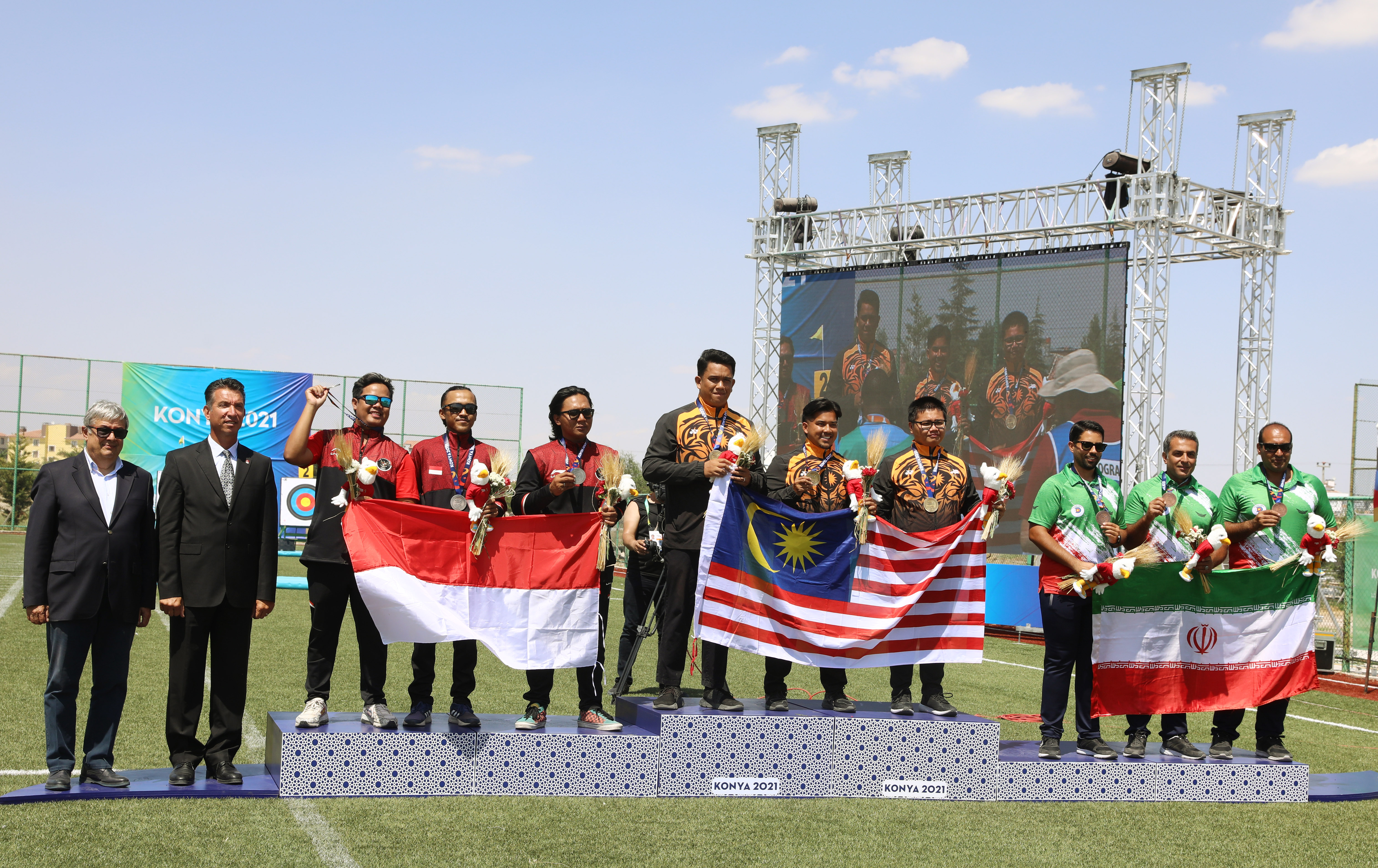
Compound men medal ceremony

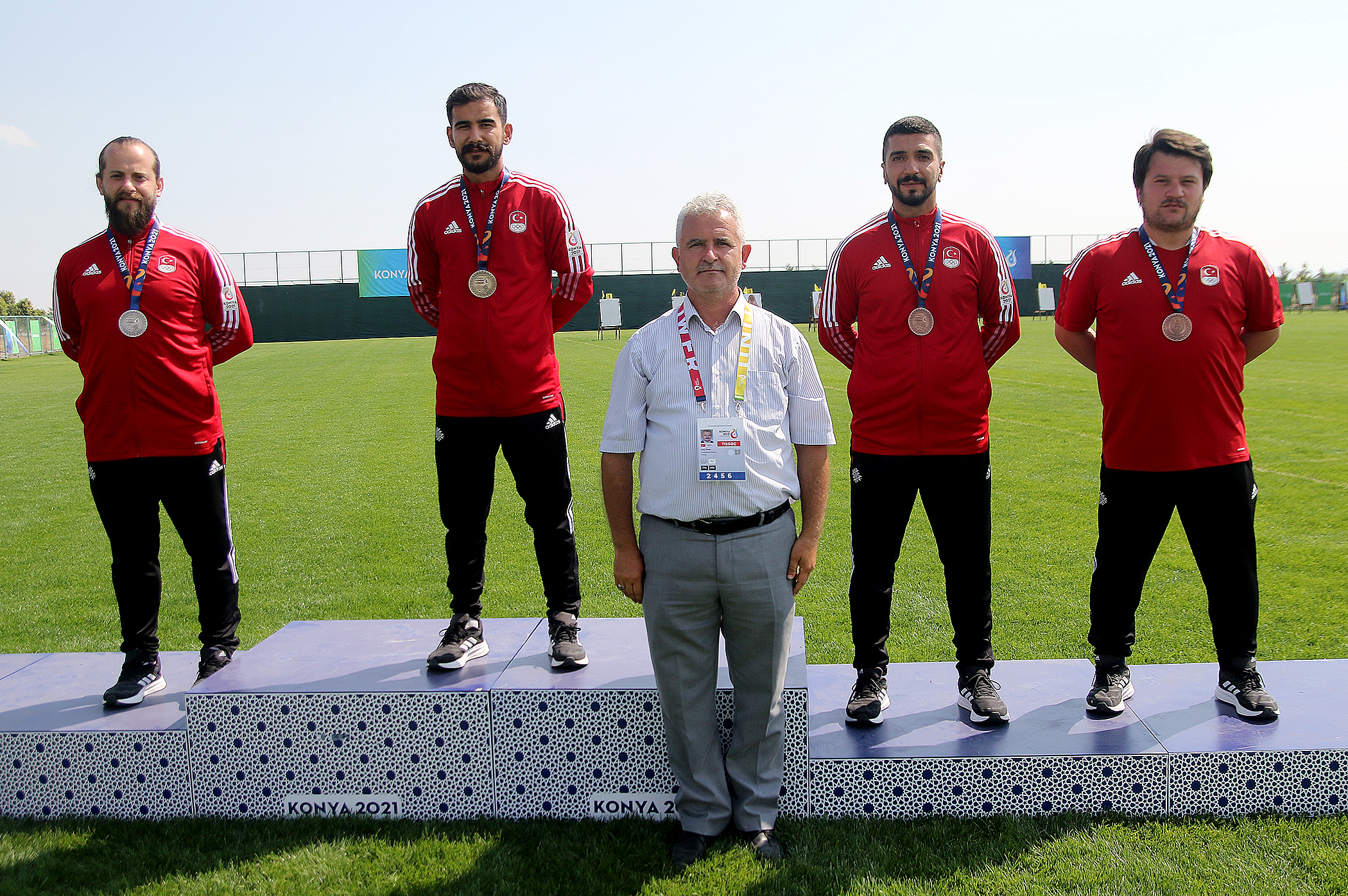
Traditional Turkish archery men medal ceremony

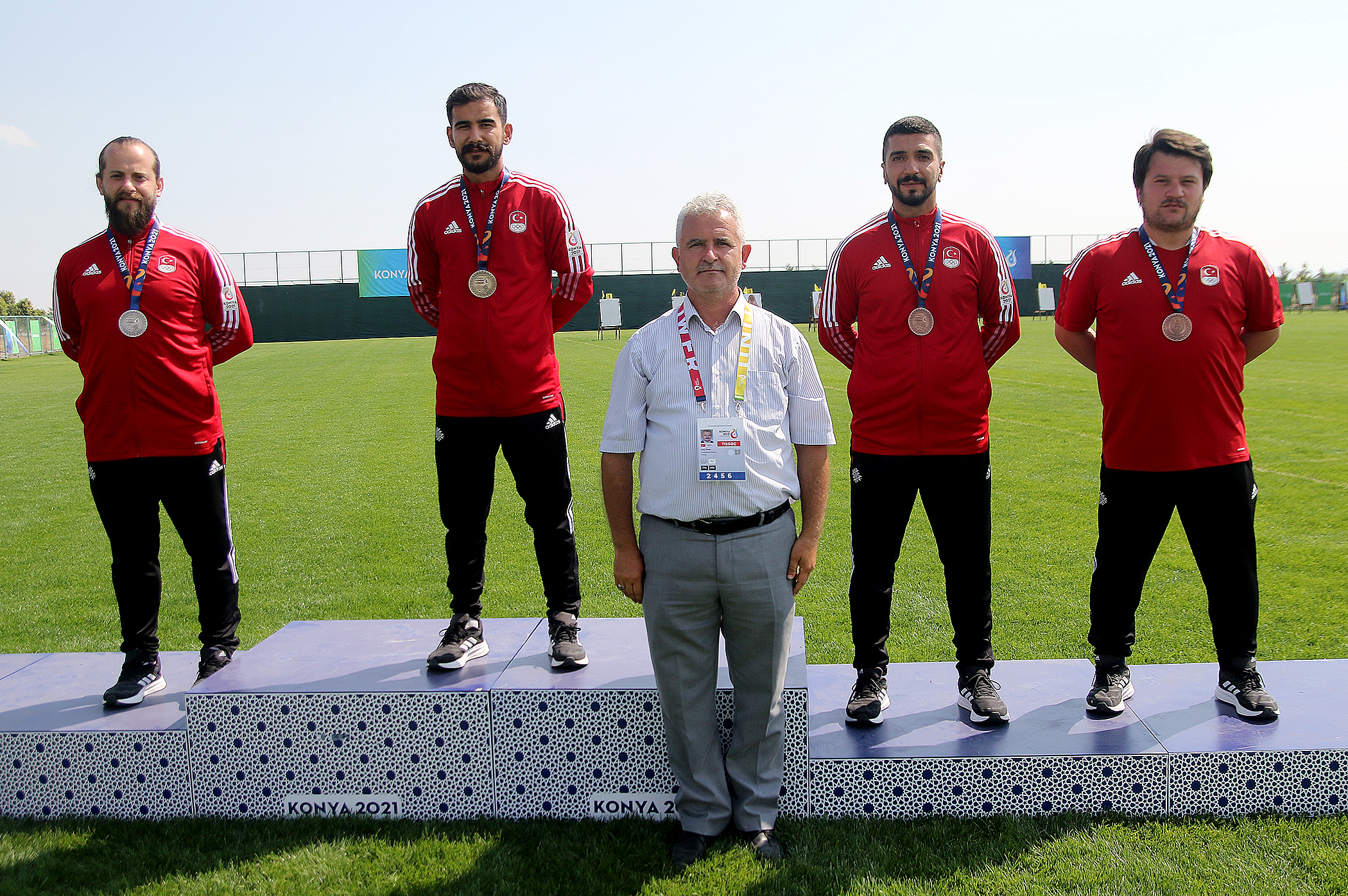
Traditional Turkish archery women puta target medal ceremony

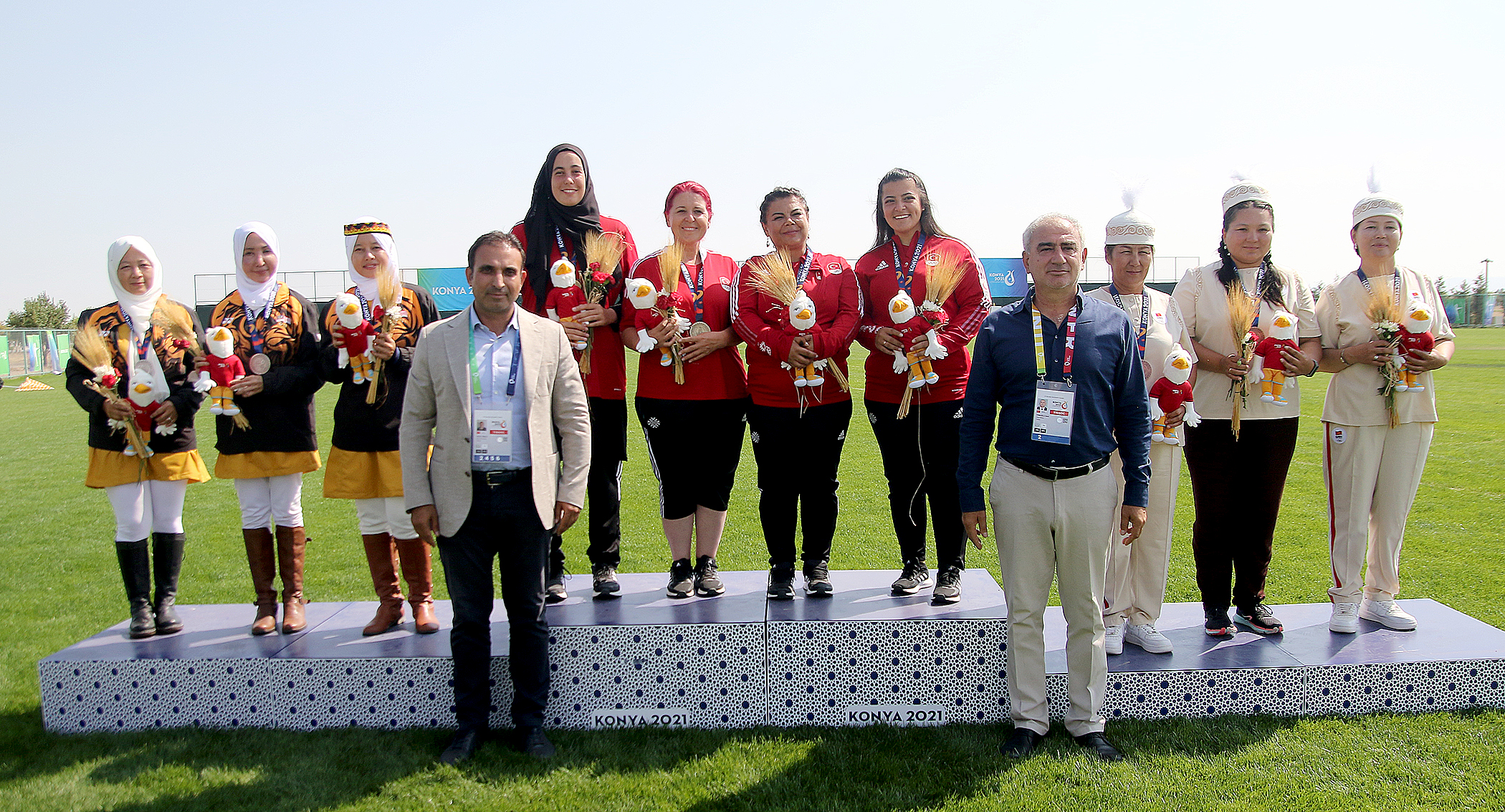
Traditional Turkish archery women puta target team medal ceremony

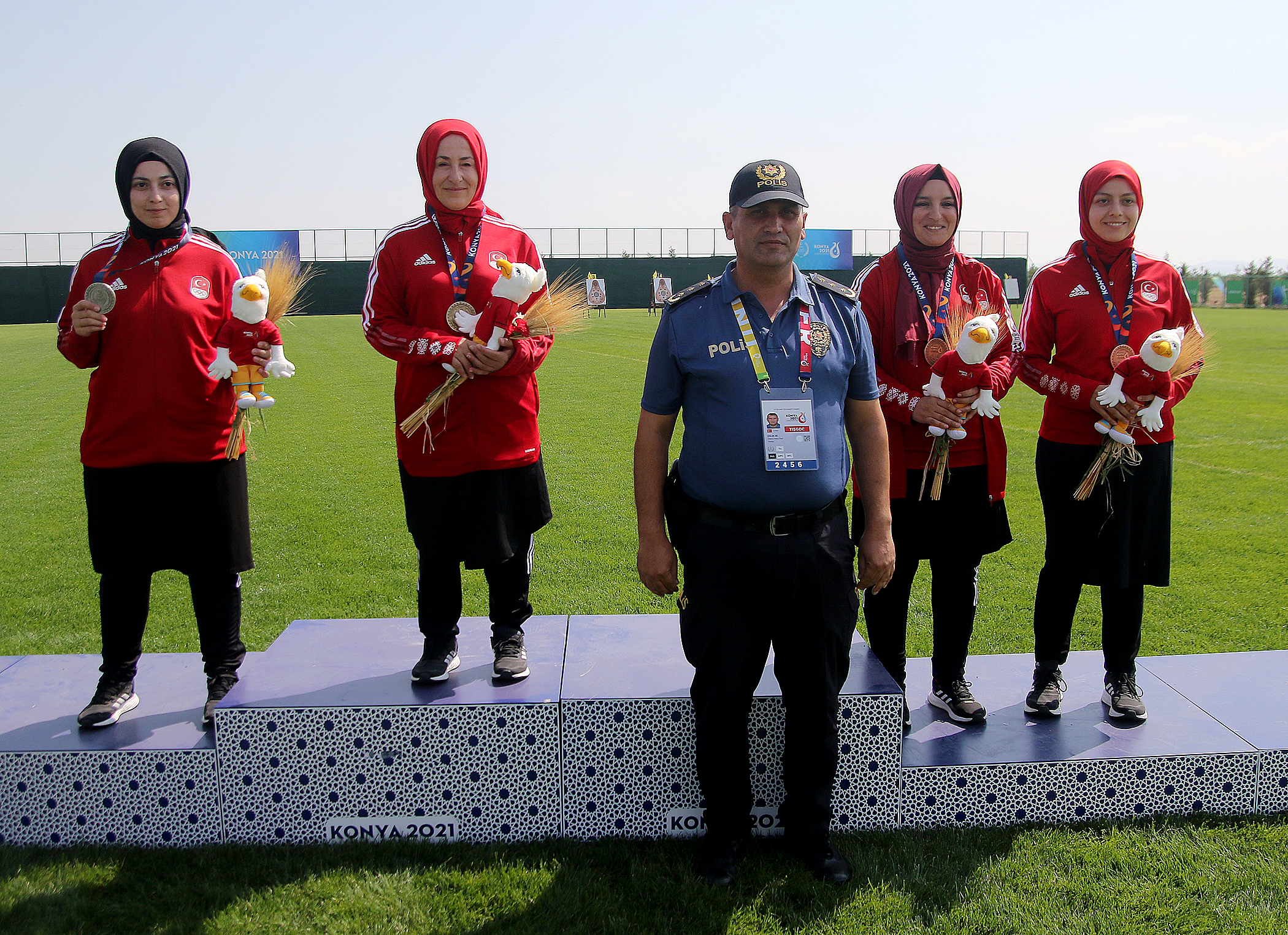
Traditional Turkish archery women limitless flight medal ceremony

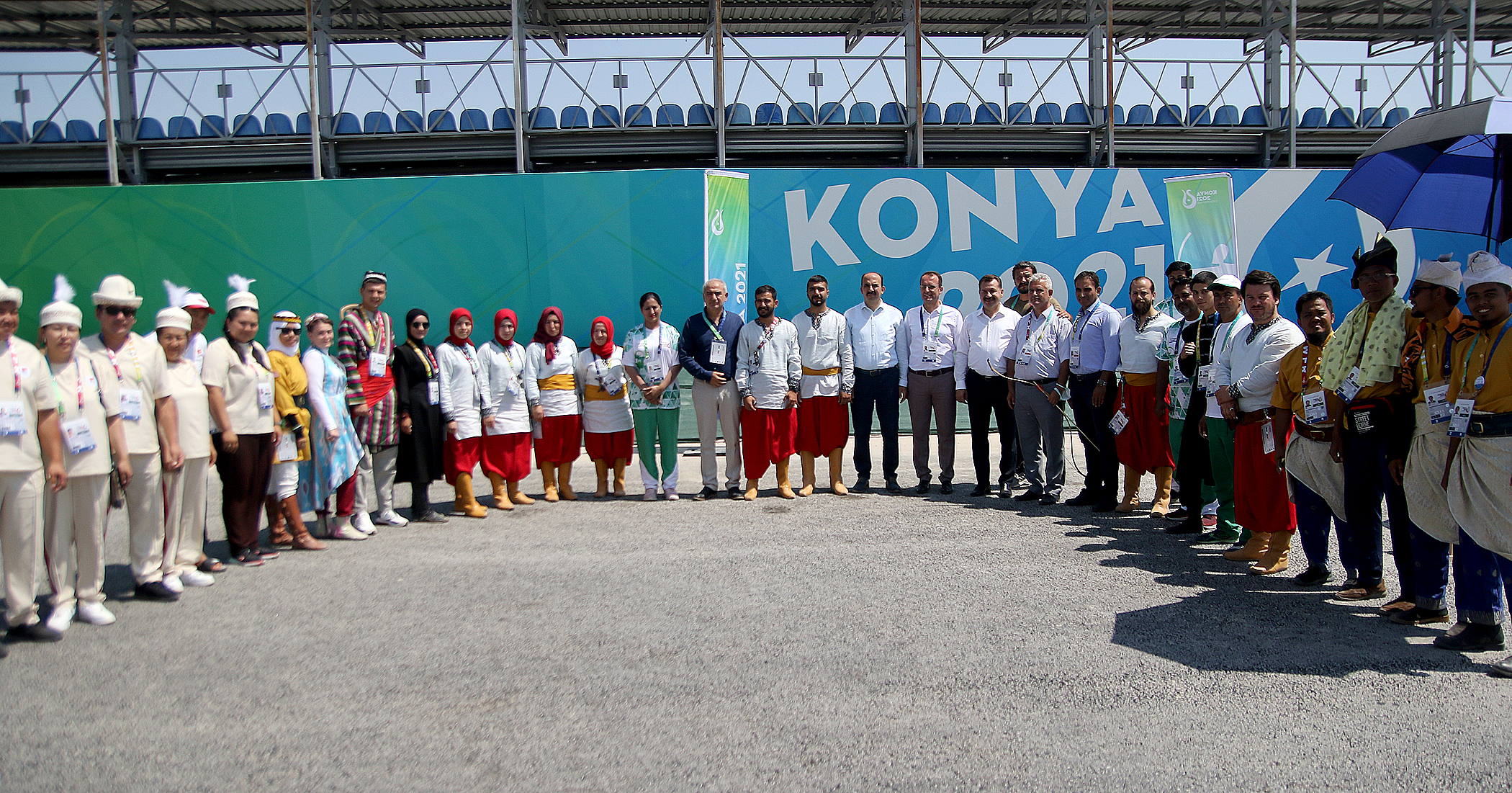
Traditional Turkish archery

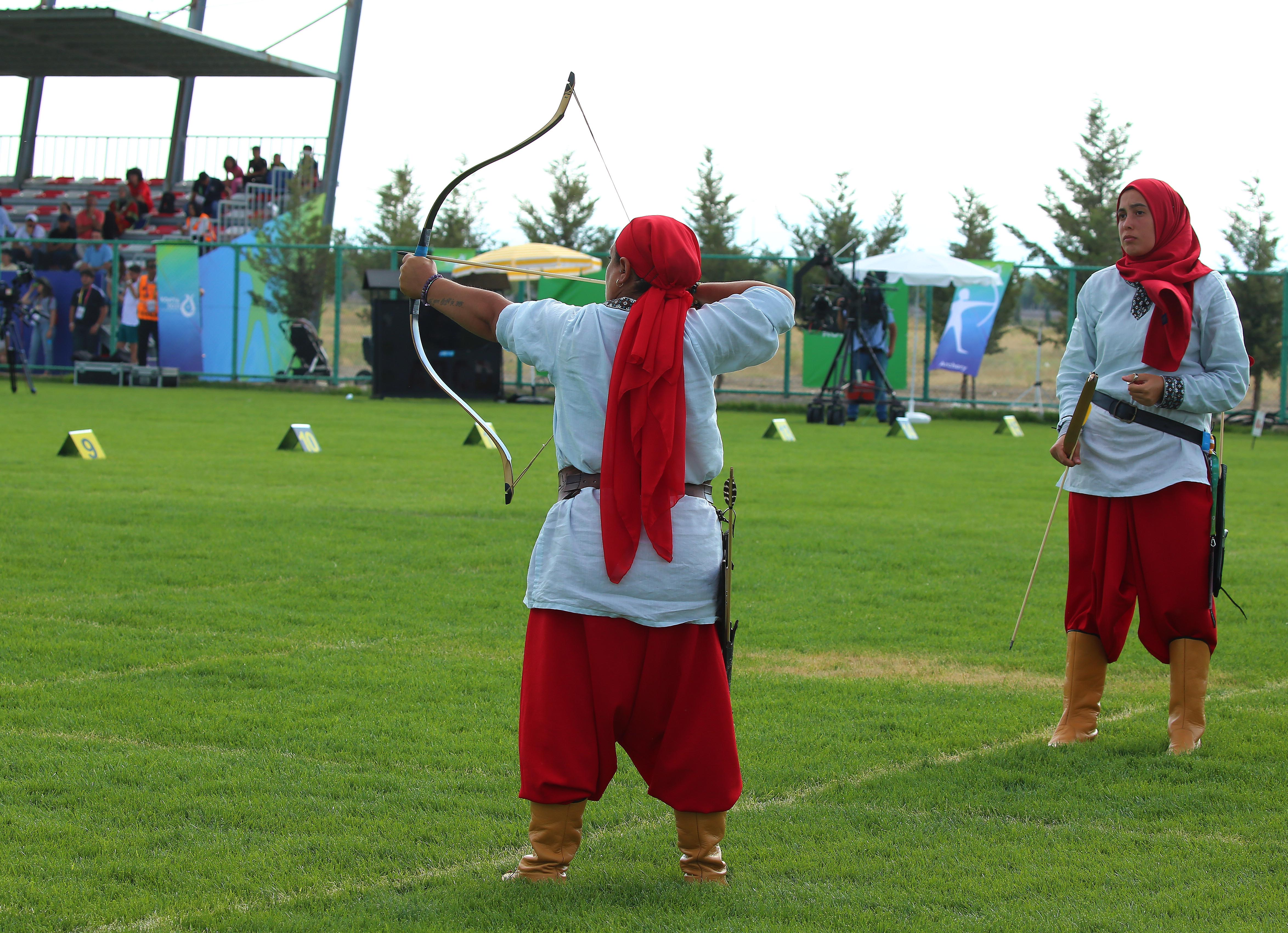
Traditional Turkish archery

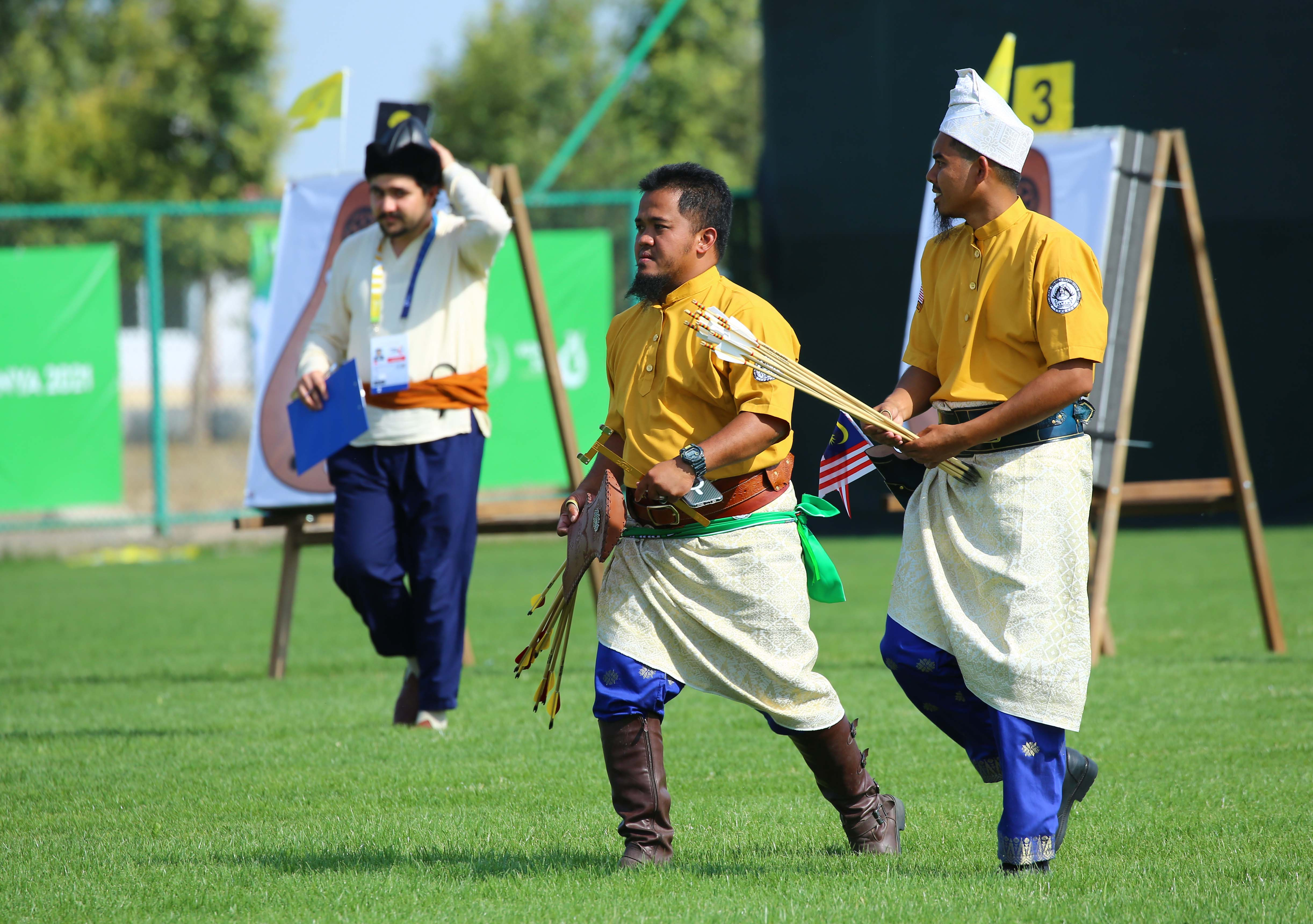
Traditional Turkish archery

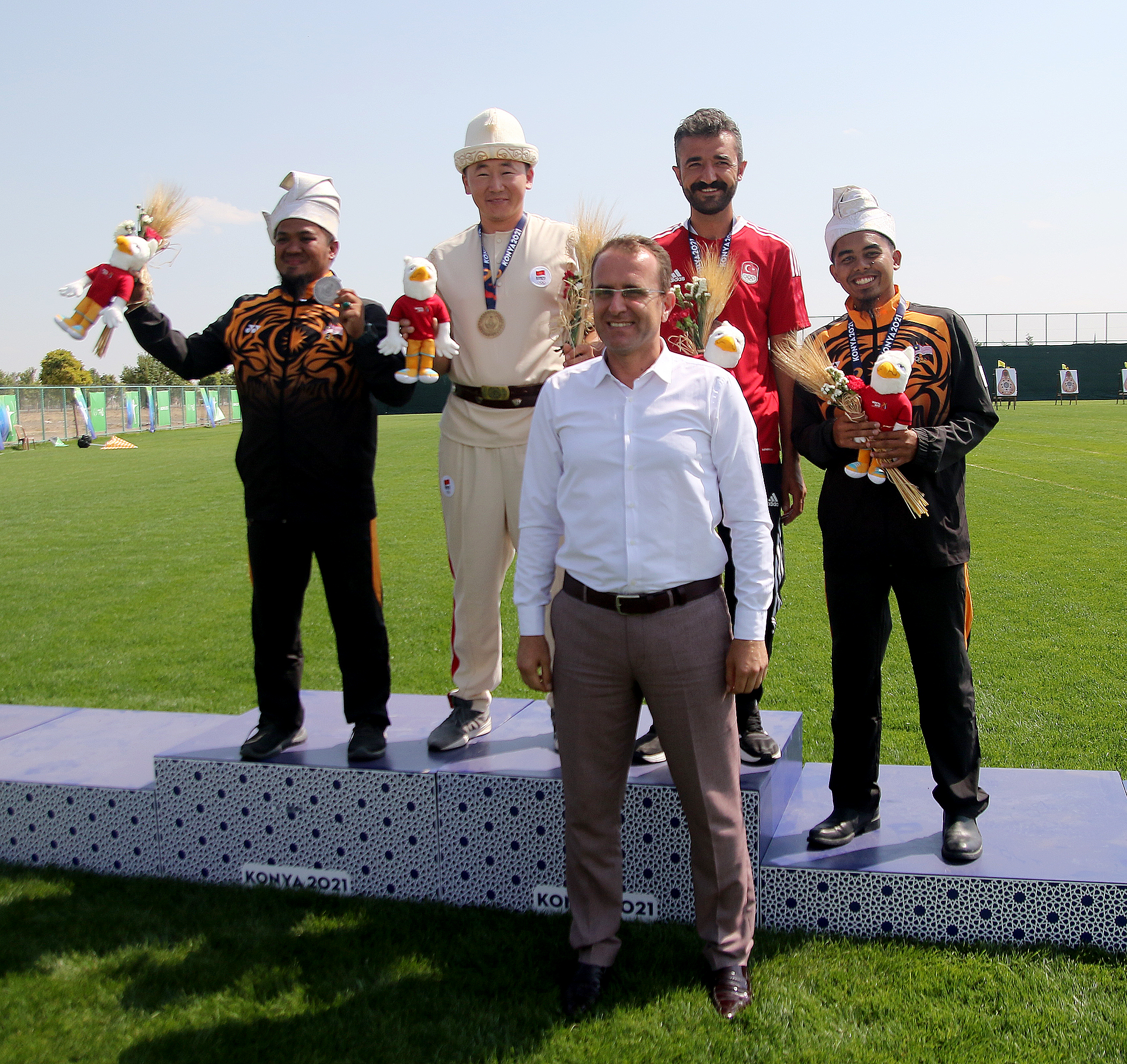
Traditional Turkish archery Puta target medal ceremony

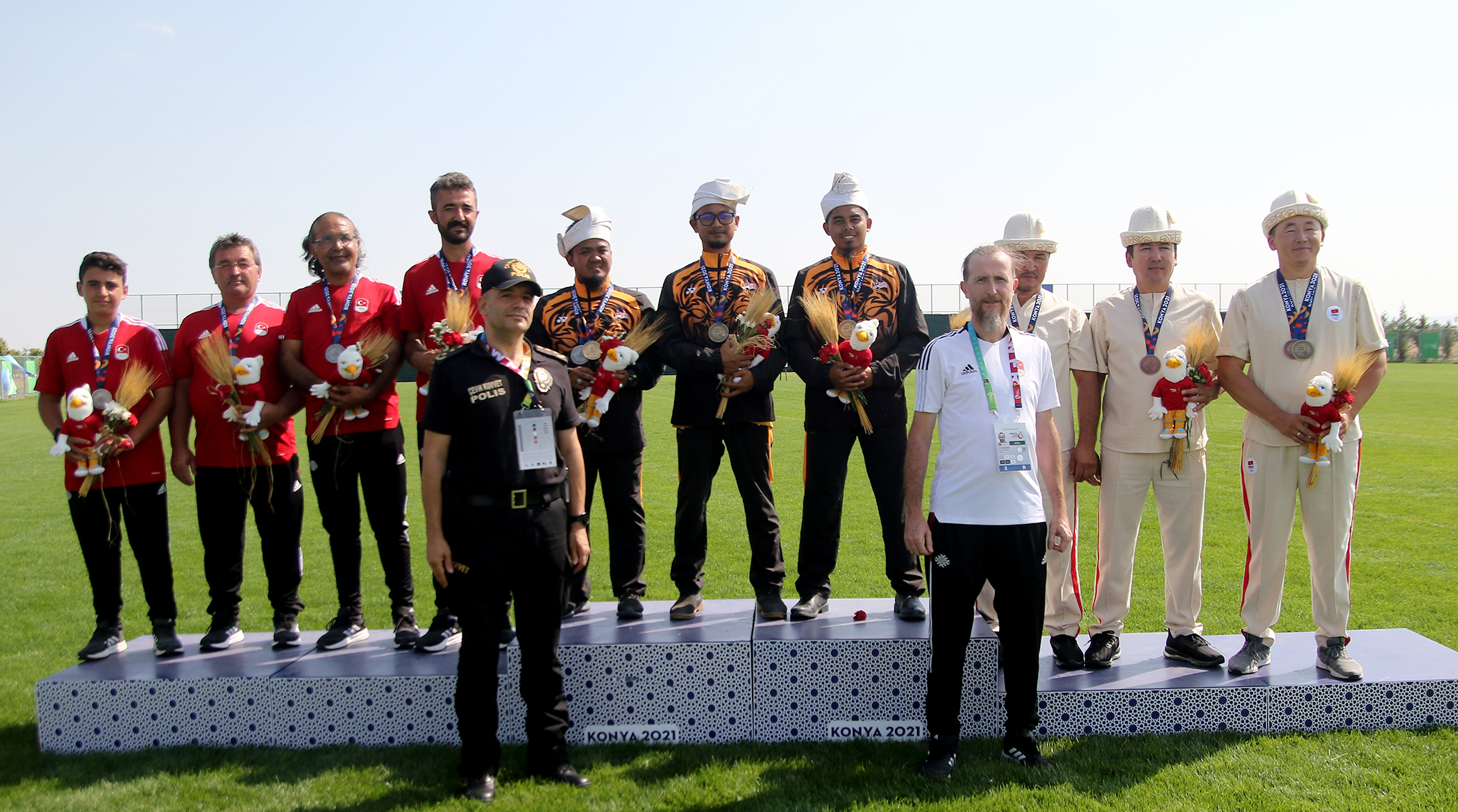
Traditional Turkish archery Puta target team medal ceremony

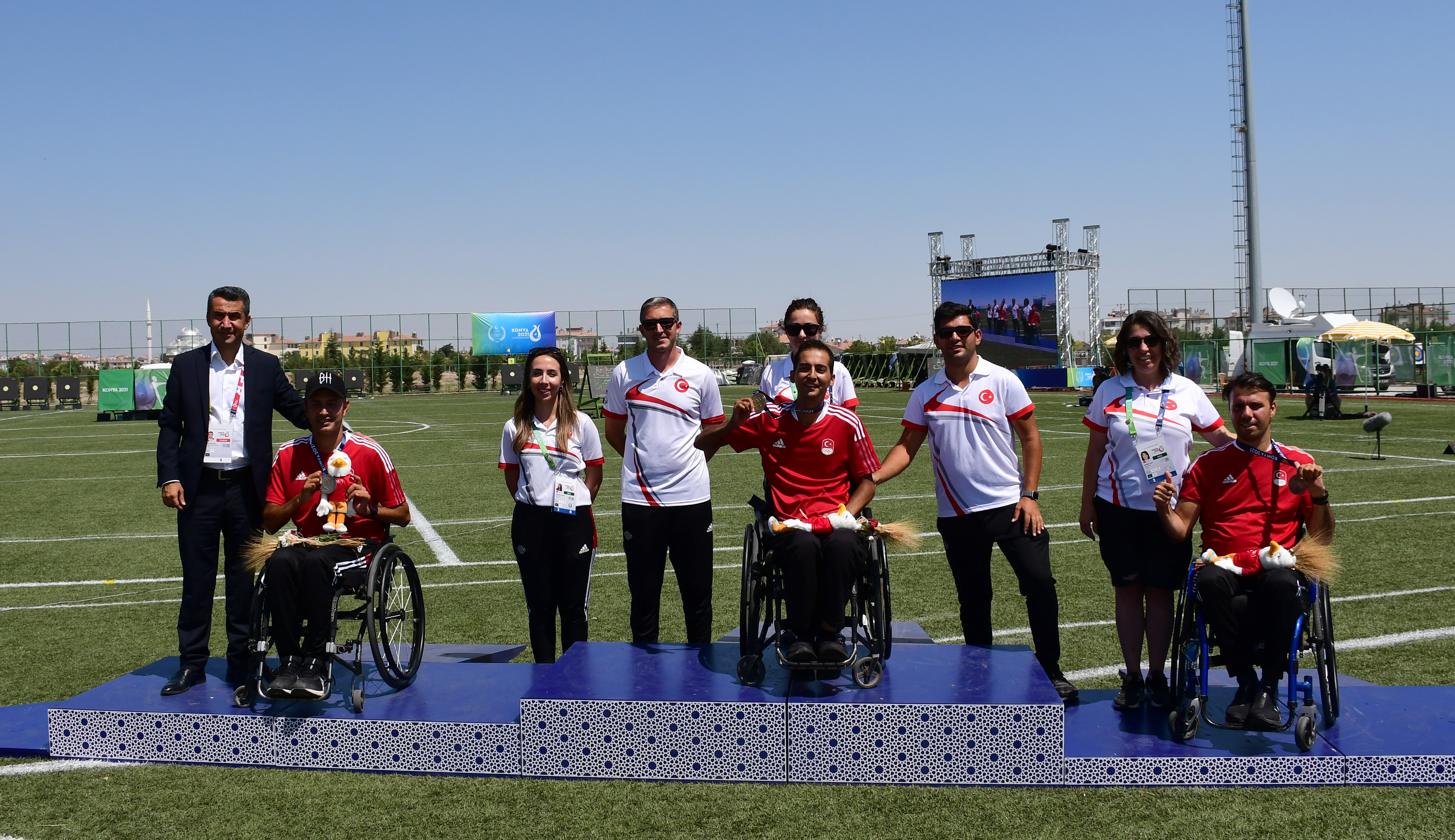
Para archery men's W1 open medal ceremony

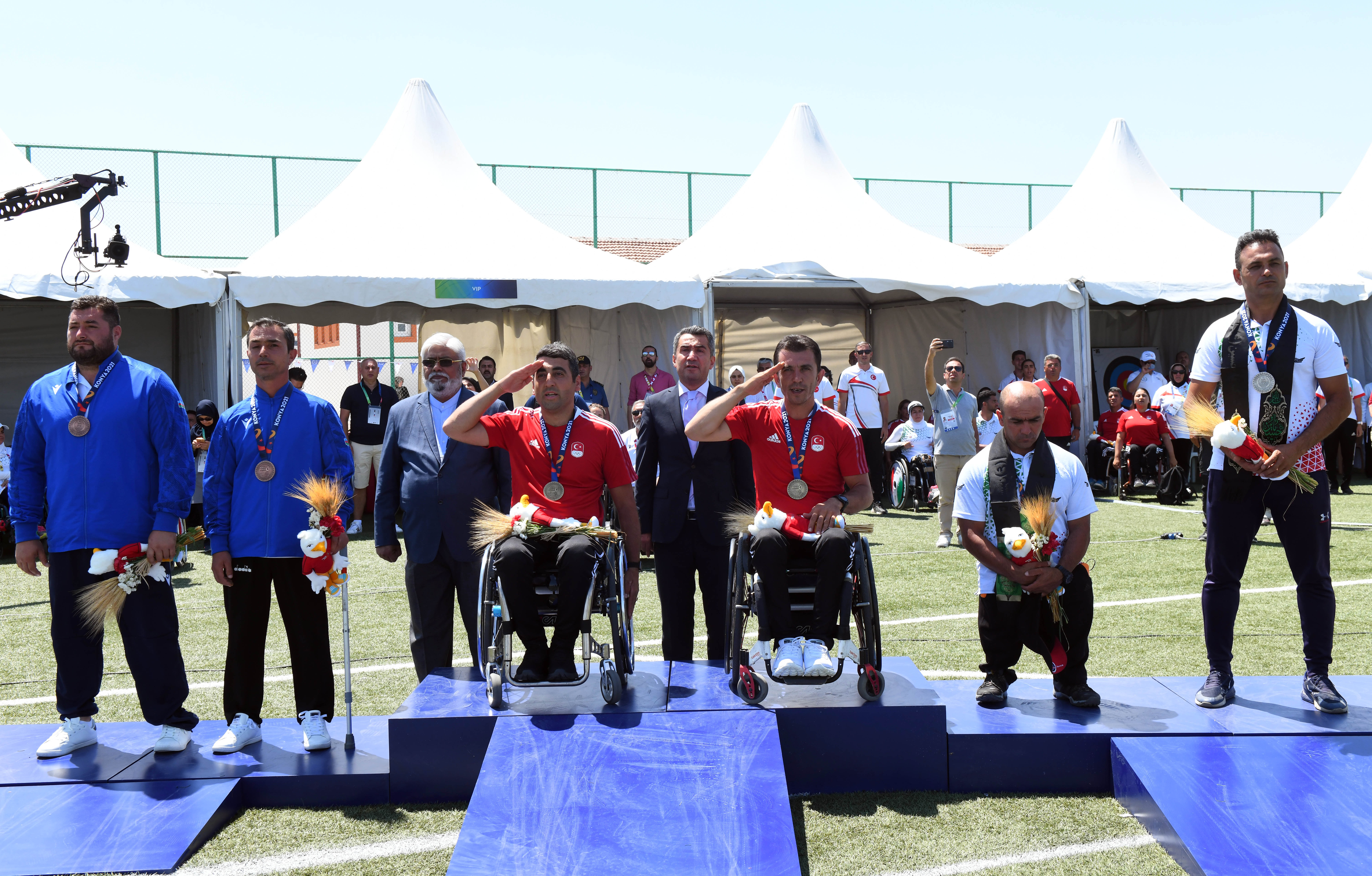
Para archery recurve bow men's team medal ceremony

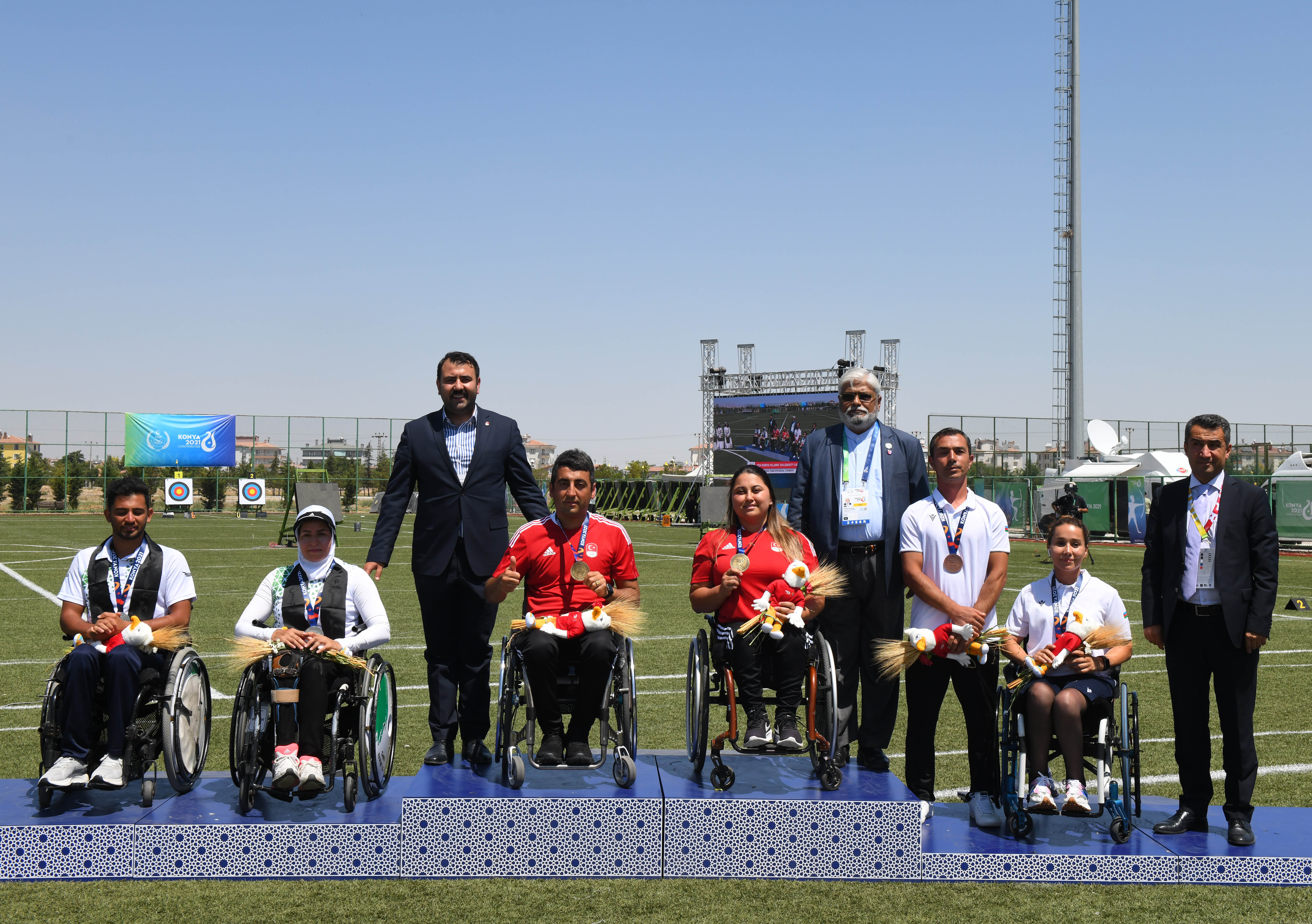
Para archery recurve bow mixed team medal ceremony

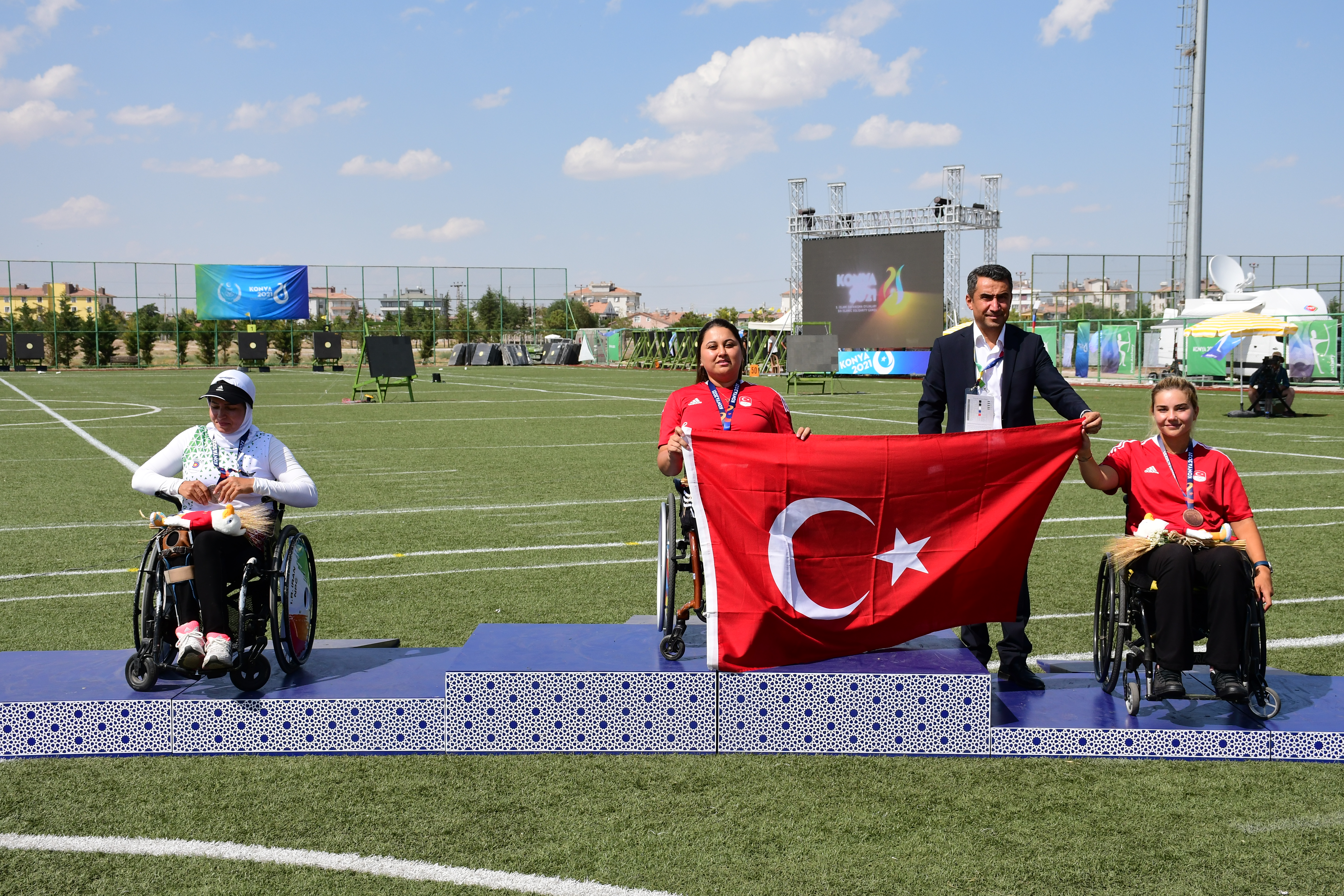
Para archery recurve bow women's medal ceremony

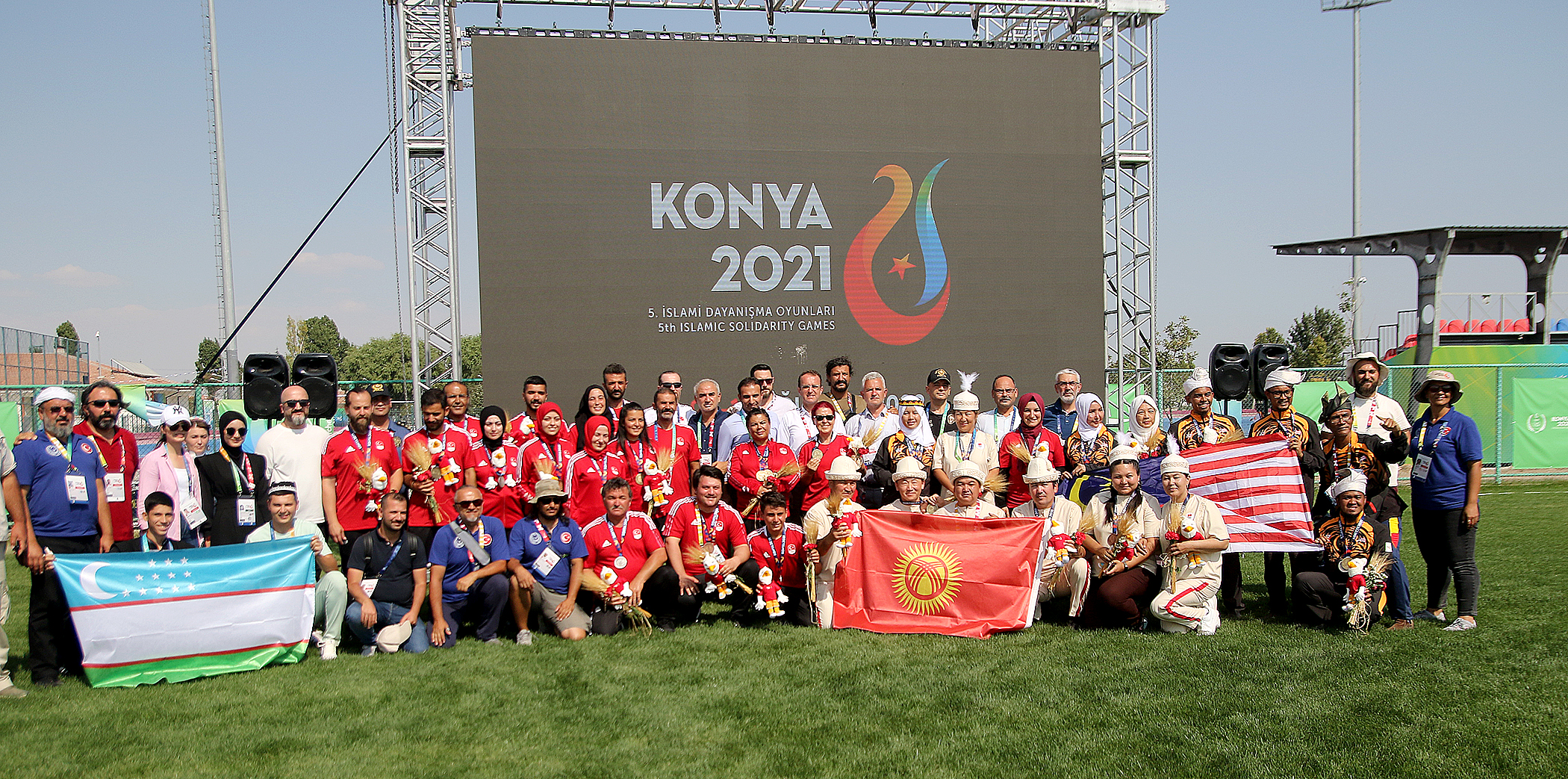
Traditional Turkish archery puta target team

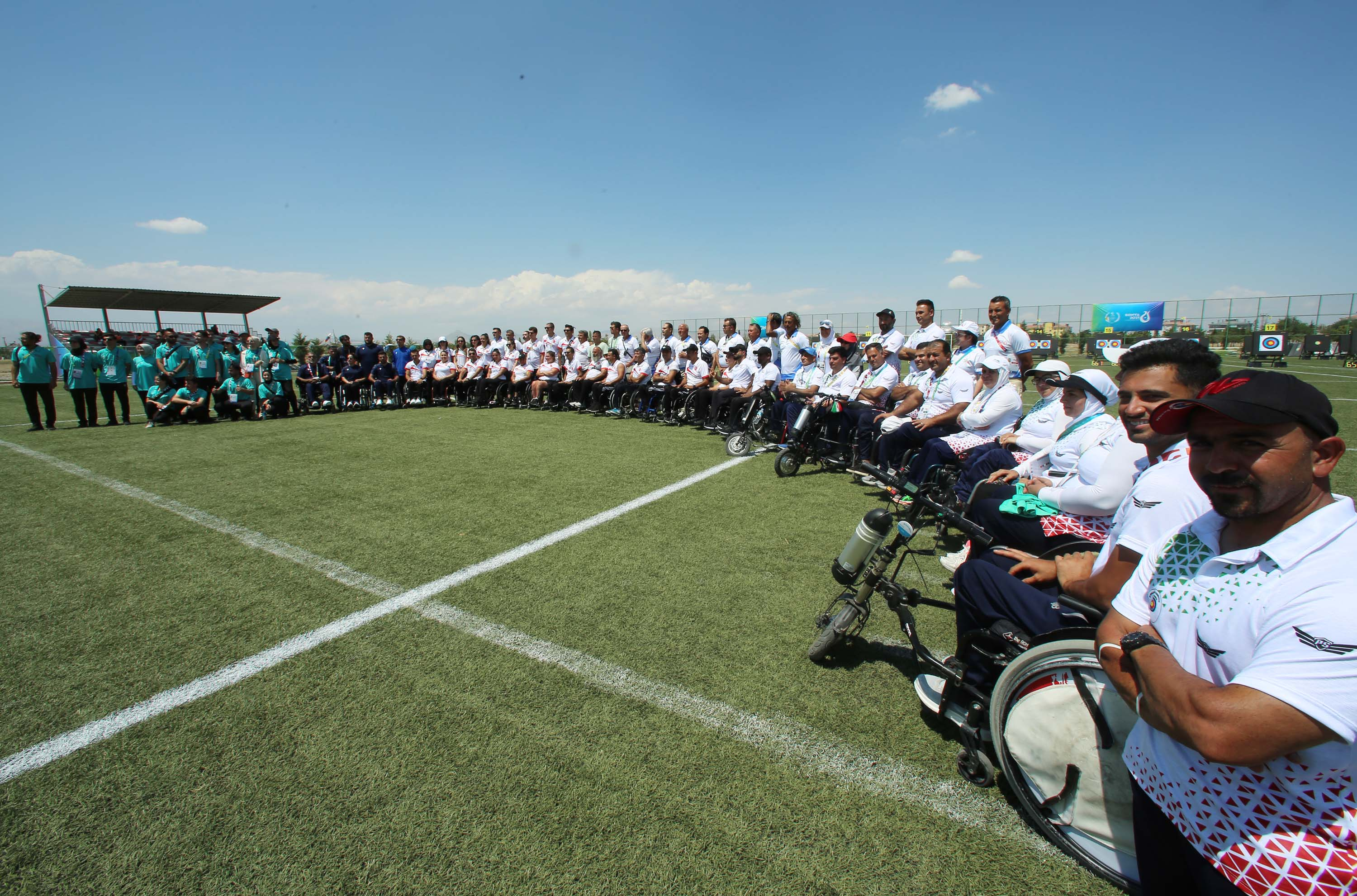
Para archery

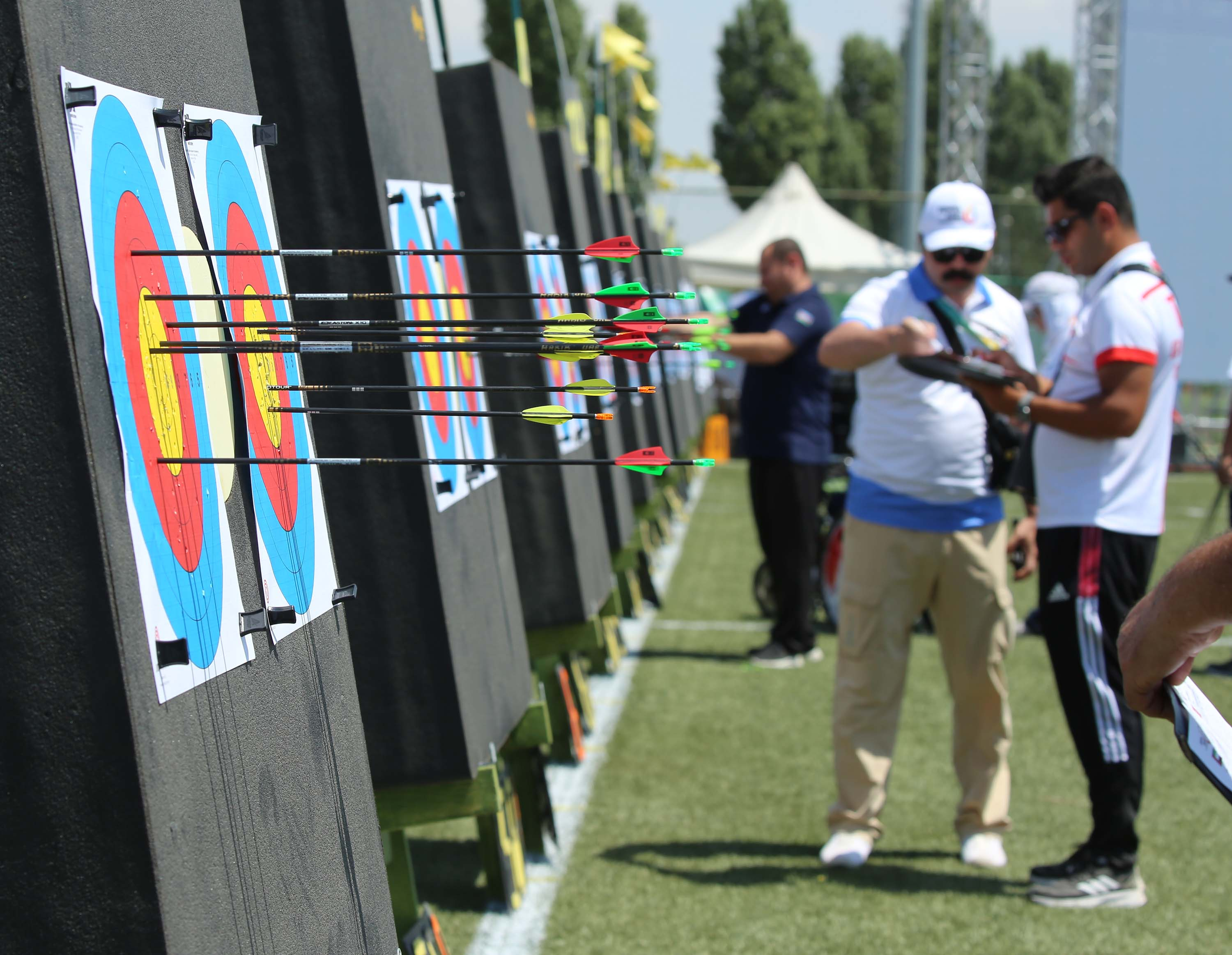
Para archery

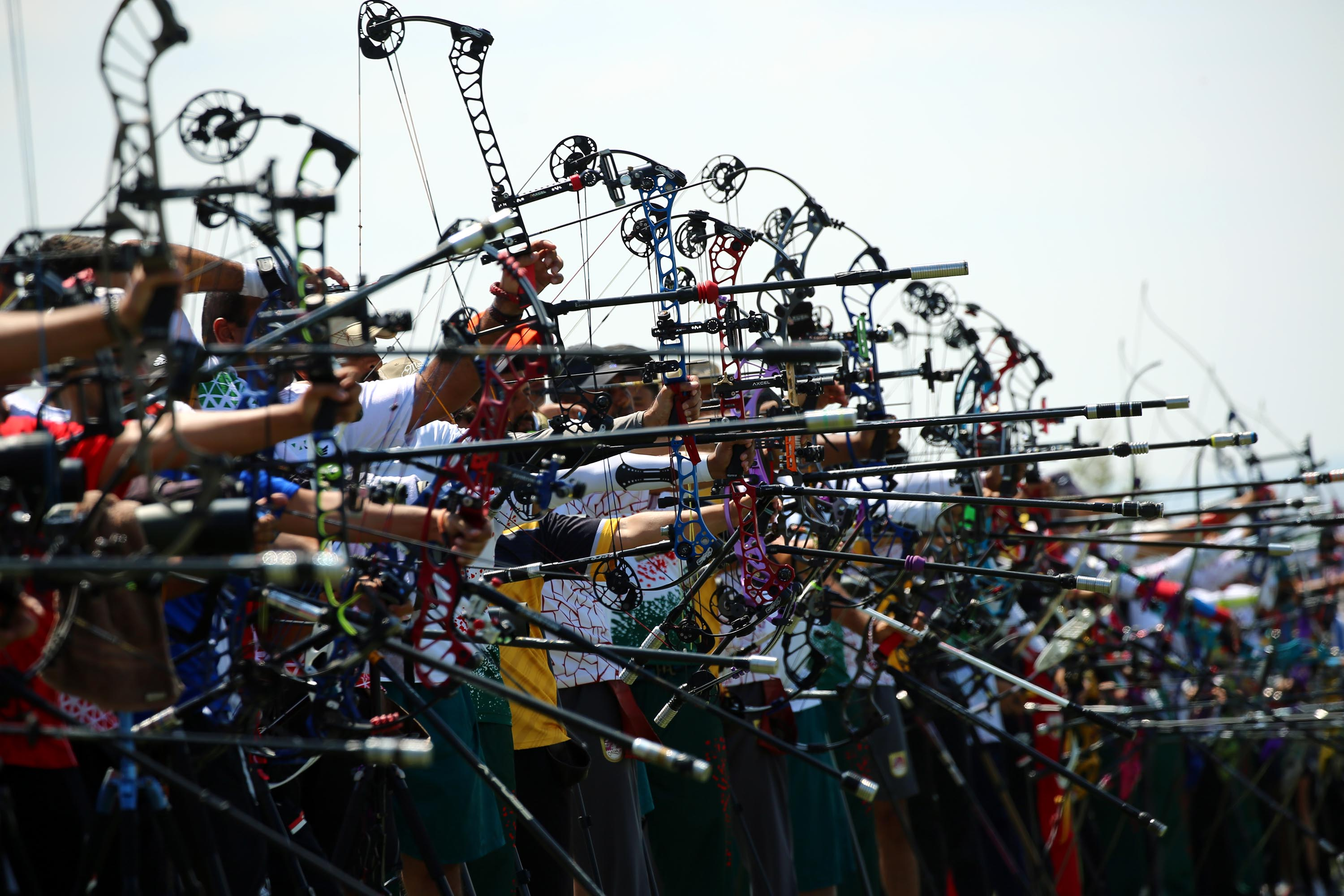
Compound archery

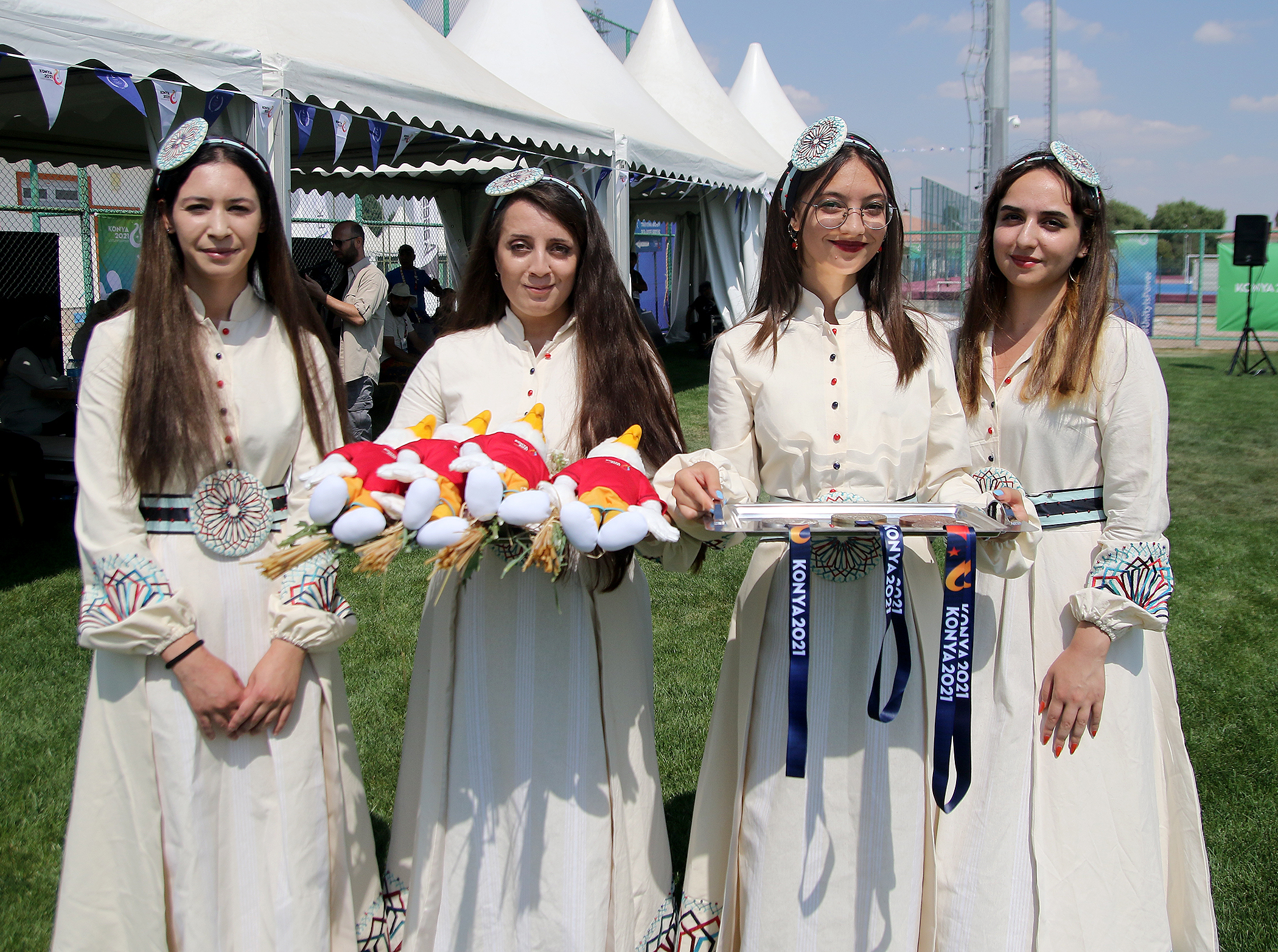
Traditional Turkish archery
