= Archery at the 2020 Summer Paralympics – Mixed team W1 =

Mixed team W1 at the XVI Paralympic Games
- Paralympic Archery
- Venue: Tokyo
- Dates: 27 August 2021 (ranking round); 28 August 2021 (match play)
- Competitors: 14 from 7 nations
- Teams: 7

Medalists
| 1st place, gold medalist(s) | | Chen Minyi; Zhang Tianxin | China |
| 2nd place, silver medalist(s) | | Šárka Musilová; David Drahonínský | Czech Republic |
| 3rd place, bronze medalist(s) | | Elena Krutova; Aleksei Leonov | RPC |

The mixed team W1 was one of three team events held at the 2020 Summer Paralympics in Tokyo, Japan. It contain seven teams of one man and one woman. The ranking round was held on 27 August.

Following a ranking round, the teams ranked 2nd to 7th entered the knockout rounds at the quarterfinal stages, with the highest seeded team entering in the semi-final round. The losing semifinalists played off for the bronze medal. Knockouts were decided on an aggregate score basis, with each archer shooting 8 arrows apiece.

== Results ==
=== Ranking round ===
| Rank | Nation | Gender | Archer | Ind. Score | Combined Score | Notes |
|---|---|---|---|---|---|---|
| 1 | China | F | Chen Minyi | 640 | 1290 | WR |
| 1 | China | M | Zhang Tianxin | 650 | 1290 | WR |
| 2 | Czech Republic | F | Šárka Musilová | 589 | 1240 | |
| 2 | Czech Republic | M | David Drahonínský | 651 | 1240 | |
| 3 | South Korea | F | Kim Ok-geum | 598 | 1223 | |
| 3 | South Korea | M | Koo Dong-sub | 625 | 1223 | |
| 4 | Japan | F | Aiko Okazaki | 576 | 1200 | |
| 4 | Japan | M | Kohji Oyama | 624 | 1200 | |
| 5 | RPC | F | Elena Krutova | 567 | 1179 | |
| 5 | RPC | M | Aleksei Leonov | 612 | 1179 | |
| 6 | Turkey | F | Fatma Danabaş | 515 | 1176 | |
| 6 | Turkey | M | Nihat Türkmenoğlu | 661 | 1176 | |
| 7 | Brazil | F | Rejane Cândida da Silva | 525 | 1147 | |
| 7 | Brazil | M | Hélcio Perilo | 622 | 1147 | |

=== Elimination round ===
Quarter-finals
5 | Elena Krutova (RPC); Aleksei Leonov (RPC) | 132
4 | Aiko Okazaki (JPN); Kohji Oyama (JPN) | 119
3 | Kim Ok-geum (KOR); Koo Dong-sub (KOR) | 133
6 | Fatma Danabaş (TUR); Nihat Türkmenoğlu (TUR) | 114
7 | Rejane Cândida da Silva (BRA); Hélcio Perilo (BRA) | 126
2 | Šárka Musilová (CZE); David Drahonínský (CZE) | 131

Semi-finals
1 | Chen Minyi (CHN); Zhang Tianxin (CHN) | 142
5 | Elena Krutova (RPC); Aleksei Leonov (RPC) | 128
3 | Kim Ok-geum (KOR); Koo Dong-sub (KOR) | 126
2 | Šárka Musilová (CZE); David Drahonínský (CZE) | 141

Final
1 | Chen Minyi (CHN); Zhang Tianxin (CHN) | 138
2 | Šárka Musilová (CZE); David Drahonínský (CZE) | 132
Third place match
5 | Elena Krutova (RPC); Aleksei Leonov (RPC) | 132
3 | Kim Ok-geum (KOR); Koo Dong-sub (KOR) | 127
