= Archery at the 2020 Summer Paralympics – Women's individual W1 =

Archery, Women's W1 at the XVI Paralympic Games
- Venue: Yumenoshima Park Archery Field
- Dates: 27 August 2021 (ranking round); 1 September 2021 (match play)
- Competitors: 12 from 10 nations

Medalists
1st place, gold medalist(s)		Chen Minyi	China
2nd place, silver medalist(s)		Šárka Musilová	Czech Republic
3rd place, bronze medalist(s)		Victoria Rumary	Great Britain

The women's individual W1 archery discipline at the 2020 Summer Paralympics was held at the Yumenoshima Park on 27 August and 1 September 2021.

In the ranking rounds each archer shoots 72 arrows, and is seeded according to score. In the knock-out stages each archer shoots three arrows per set against an opponent, the scores being aggregated. Losing semifinalists compete in a bronze medal match. As the field contained 12 archers, the four highest ranked archers will proceed directly to the quarter-final round; the remaining eight will enter in the round-of-16.

== Ranking round ==
The ranking round of the women's individual W1 event was held on 27 August.

Rank	Archer	Nation	10s	Xs	Score	Notes
1	Chen Minyi	China	20	8	640	PR
2	Liu Jing	China	16	5	615	
3	Asia Pellizzari	Italy	13	5	604	
4	Kim Ok-geum	South Korea	16	6	598	
5	Lia Coryell	United States	17	6	596	
6	Victoria Rumary	Great Britain	11	2	590	
7	Šárka Musilová	Czech Republic	13	4	589	
8	Tereza Brandtlová	Czech Republic	7	0	585	
9	Aiko Okazaki	Japan	8	2	576	
10	Elena Krutova	RPC	5	1	567	
11	Rejane Cândida da Silva	Brazil	12	4	525	PB
12	Fatma Danabaş	Turkey	7	3	515	

== Elimination round ==
The elimination round took place on 1 September 2021.

Round of 16
9	Okazaki (JPN)	128
8	Brandtlová (CZE)	115
5	Coryell (USA)	126
12	Danabaş (TUR)	115
11	da Silva (BRA)	107
6	Rumary (GBR)	115
7	Musilová (CZE)	128 ^{9}
10	Krutova (RPC)	128 ^{8}

Quarterfinals
1	Chen (CHN)	132
9	Okazaki (JPN)	129
5	Coryell (USA)	127
4	Kim (KOR)	125
3	Pellizzari (ITA)	124
6	Rumary (GBR)	130
7	Musilová (CZE)	128
2	Liu (CHN)	124

Semifinals
1	Chen (CHN)	137
5	Coryell (USA)	126
6	Rumary (GBR)	107
7	Musilová (CZE)	127

Gold medal match
1	Chen (CHN)	142
7	Musilová (CZE)	131
Bronze medal match
5	Coryell (USA)	123
6	Rumary (GBR)	131
