= Archery at the 2020 Summer Paralympics – Men's individual compound W1 =

Archery, Men's compound W1 at the XVI Paralympic Games
- Venue: Tokyo, Japan
- Competitors: 12 from 10 nations

The Men's individual compound W1 archery discipline at the 2020 Summer Paralympics will be contested from September 10 to September 16. Ranking rounds take place on 10 September, while knockout rounds continue on September 16.

In the ranking rounds each archer shoots 72 arrows, and is seeded according to score. In the knock-out stages each archer shoots three arrows per set against an opponent, the scores being aggregated. Losing semifinalists compete in a bronze medal match. As the field contained 12 archers, the four highest ranked archers in the ranking round will receive a bye into the quarter-final round.

== Ranking Round ==
PR = Paralympic Record.

Rank	Archer	Nation	Score	Notes
	Bahattin Hekimoglu	Turkey		
	Nihat Turkmenoglu	Turkey		
	Helcio Gomes Perilo	Brazil		
	David Drahoninsky	Czech Republic		
	Tamas Gaspar	Hungary		
	Mohammadreza Zandi	Iran		
	Kohji Oyama	Japan		
	Koo Dong Sub	South Korea		
	Li Ji	China		
		China		
	Shaun Anderson	South Africa		
	Aleksei Leonov	RPC		

== Knockout stage ==
The knockout stages, including medal finals, were scheduled for September 16, 2016. The Knockout matches, in common with the other events in the Archery competition, are single elimination until the semi-finals (were losers play off for bronze), and as with the other individual compound events, the men's compound W1 knockout matches are contested over sets of three arrows for each archer, with the scores aggregated.

Preliminary round
1
bye
9
8
5
12
bye
4
3
bye
11
6
7
10
bye
2

Quarter finals
1
4
3
2

Semi finals

Gold medal match
Bronze medal match
