= Archery at the 2020 Summer Paralympics – Men's individual W1 =

Archery, Men's W1 at the XVI Paralympic Games
- Venue: Yumenoshima Park Archery Field
- Dates: 27–30 August
- Competitors: 12 from 10 nations

Medalists
1st place, gold medalist(s)		David Drahonínský	Czech Republic
2nd place, silver medalist(s)		Nihat Türkmenoğlu	Turkey
3rd place, bronze medalist(s)		Bahattin Hekimoğlu	Turkey

The men's individual W1 archery discipline at the 2020 Summer Paralympics will be contested from 27 to 30 August.

In the ranking rounds each archer shoots 72 arrows, and is seeded according to score. In the knock-out stages each archer shoots three arrows per set against an opponent, the scores being aggregated. Losing semifinalists compete in a bronze medal match. As the field contained 12 archers, the four highest ranked archers will proceed directly to the quarter-final round; the remaining eight will enter in the Round of 16.

== Ranking round ==
The ranking round of the men's individual W1 event was held on 27 August.

Rank	Archer	Nation	10s	Xs	Score	Notes
1	Nihat Türkmenoğlu	Turkey	23	7	661	PR
2	David Drahonínský	Czech Republic	23	8	651	
3	Zhang Tianxin	China	26	9	650	
4	Tamás Gáspár	Hungary	22	4	647	
5	Bahattin Hekimoğlu	Turkey	20	8	643	
6	Mohammad Reza Zandi	Iran	20	5	643	SB
7	Shaun Anderson	South Africa	17	4	637	
8	Koo Dong-sub	South Korea	17	8	625	
9	Kohji Oyama	Japan	14	3	624	PB
10	Hélcio Perilo	Brazil	13	1	622	PB
11	Li Ji	China	13	4	616	
12	Alexei Leonov	RPC	16	7	612	

== Knockout rounds ==
Round of 16
9	Oyama (JPN)	129 ^{10+}
8	Koo (KOR)	129 ^{10}
5	Hekimoğlu (TUR)	135
12	Leonov (RPC)	107
11	Li (CHN)	133
6	Zandi (IRI)	138
7	Anderson (RSA)	123 ^{6}
10	Perilo (BRA)	123 ^{9}

Quarterfinals
1	Türkmenoğlu (TUR)	133
9	Oyama (JPN)	129
5	Hekimoğlu (TUR)	138
4	Gáspár (HUN)	135
3	Zhang (CHN)	129
6	Zandi (IRI)	137
10	Perilo (BRA)	129
2	Drahonínský (CZE)	140

Semifinals
1	Türkmenoğlu (TUR)	139
5	Hekimoğlu (TUR)	132
6	Zandi (IRI)	131
2	Drahonínský (CZE)	139

Gold medal match
1	Türkmenoğlu (TUR)	141
2	Drahonínský (CZE)	142
Bronze medal match
5	Hekimoğlu (TUR)	139
6	Zandi (IRI)	134
