= Marek Margoč =

Slovak Paralympic athlete

Personal information
- Born: 1976 or 1977 (age 49–50)
Medal record
Paralympic athletics
Representing Slovakia
Paralympic Games
Gold medal – first place	2004 Athens	Shot put - F40

Marek Margoč (born 1976 or 1977) is a paralympic athlete from Slovakia competing mainly in category F40 shot put events.

== Biography ==
Margoc has twice competed in the shot put in the Paralympics. His first appearance came in 2004 Summer Paralympics where he won the gold medal, unfortunately he could not defend his title and missed out on a medal
