= Yiğit Caner Aydın =

Turkish para-archer (born 1992)

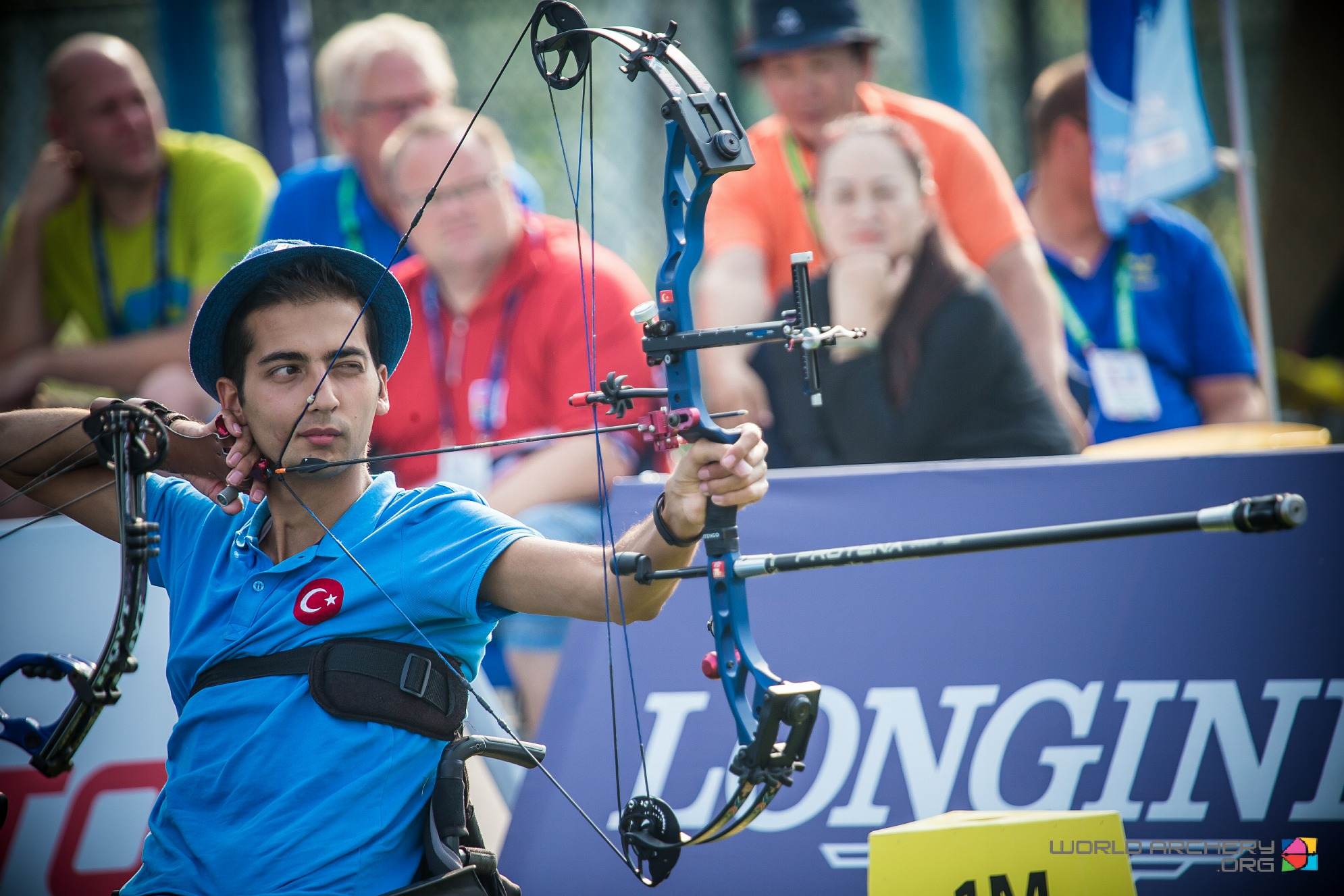
- Yiğit Caner Aydın at the 2017 World Para Archery Championships in Beijing

Personal information
- Born: 23 August 1992 (age 33) Trabzon, Turkey
- Years active: 2016
- Website: yigitcaneraydin.com/en/

Sport
- Sport: Paralympic archery
- Disability: Paraplegia
- Disability class: ARW1
- Rank: 2nd (5 September 2022)
- Event: Compound bow W1

Achievements and titles
- Highest world ranking: 2nd (5 May 2019)
Medal record
Men's archery Compound bow W1
Representing Turkey
World Championships
Gold medal – first place	2022 Dubai	W1 Ind.
Gold medal – first place	2022 Dubai	W1 Doubles
Gold medal – first place	2019 s-Hertogenbosch	W1 Open Team
Gold medal – first place	2017 Beijing	W1 Open Team
Silver medal – second place	2023 Plzeň	Men W1 Doubles
Silver medal – second place	2025 Gwangju	Doubles W1
European Championships
Gold medal – first place	2022 Rome	W1 Doubles
Silver medal – second place	2022 Rome	W1 Ind.
Islamic Solidarity Games
Gold medal – first place	2021 Konya	W1 Ind.

Yiğit Caner Aydın (born 23 August 1992) is a Turkish world-champion para-archer competing in the Men's compound bow W1 event.

== Early life ==
Yiğit Caner Aydın was born in Trabzon, northeastern Turkey on 23 August 1992. He moved to Istanbul with his family at the age of three.

In 2006, he started to develop web projects, and earning his living. In 2010, he entered Faculty of Astronomy and Space Science at Istanbul University. By participating in social responsibility projects, he aimed to help children living in disadvantaged regions develop their social skills and themselves.

In 2013, as he was sitting in a lounge at his friend's school, a heavy stand fell over his head, and fractured his neck at C6 level. He was eight months in the hospital following six days of intensive care stay. He became paralyzed from the chest down. He underwent physical therapy for two and half years, at the end of which he was finally able to use wheelchair.

== Sports career ==
In 2016, Aydın started para archery after he met Naci Yenier, a para archer, through his father. He took part in trainings at Archery Foundation. With the money he saved before the accident, he bought archery equipment. Supported by his parents, he was training 5–6 hours a day.

He was selected to the national team. Points he collected at international competitions enabled him to participate at the World Archery Championships in 2017. He and his two teammates took the gold medal in the Men W1 Open Team event at the 2017 World Para Archery Championships in Beijing, China. He was part of team setting a World record in the 50m event with 1,967 points. He won the gold medal in the Men W1 Open event and another gold medal in the Men W1 Open Team event with two teammates at the First Leg of the 2019 Para Archery European Cup held in Olbia, Sardinia, Italy. The Turkish team set a World record with 215 points. At the 2019 World Para Archery Championships in 's-Hertogenbosch, Netherlands, he won the gold medal in the Men W1 Open Team, and repeated the World Team record . He became champion in the Men W1 event at the Para-Archery World Ranking Tournament and Final Paralympic Qualification 2021 held in Nové Město nad Metují, Czech Republic. He won two gold medals at the 2022 World Para Archery Championships held in Dubai, United Arab Emirates, one in the Men W1 event and another in the Men W1 Doubles event together with his teammate Nihat Türkmenoğlu. He won silver medal in the Men W1 and gold medal in the Men W1 Doubles event at Para-Archery European Championships at the 2022 Rome. One week after this competition, he became champion in the Men W1 event at the 2021 Konya.

Aydın ranks world second in the world ranking currently.

== See also ==
- Curtis Mayfield, who was paralyzed after a similar accident
