= Athletics at the 2004 Summer Paralympics – Men's shot put F40 =

Men's Shot Put F40 at the XII Paralympic Games
- Venue: Athens Olympic Stadium
- Dates: 21 September 2004
- Competitors: 6 from 4 nations
- Winning distance: 10.13

Medalists
1st place, gold medalist(s)		Marek Margoc	Slovakia
2nd place, silver medalist(s)		Lutz Langer	Germany
3rd place, bronze medalist(s)		Asghar Zarei Nejad	Iran

The Men's shot put F40 event for les autres (athletes with dwarfism) was held at the 2004 Summer Paralympics in the Athens Olympic Stadium. It was won by Marek Margoc, representing Slovakia.

21 Sept. 2004, 17:00

Rank	Athlete	Result	Notes
1st place, gold medalist(s)	Marek Margoc (SVK)	10.13	
2nd place, silver medalist(s)	Lutz Langer (GER)	9.67	
3rd place, bronze medalist(s)	Asghar Zarei Nejad (IRI)	9.52	
4	Ulrich Spengler (GER)	8.85	
5	Scott Danberg (USA)	8.78	
6	Rainer Schwinden (GER)	8.55	
