= Lutz Langer =

German Paralympic athlete

Medal record

Paralympic athletics

Representing Germany

Paralympic Games
Silver medal – second place	2004 Athens	Shot Put - F40

Lutz Langer is a Paralympic athlete from Germany competing mainly in category F40 shot put events.

Lutz has competed in the shot put at the 2004 and 2008 Summer Paralympics winning the silver medal in 2004.
