= Fatma Danabaş =

Turkish para-archer (born 1983)

Personal information
- Nationality: Turkish
- Born: 28 January 1983 (age 43) Turkey

Sport
- Country: Turkey
- Sport: Paralympic archery
- Event: Compound bow W1
Medal record
Women's archery Compound bow W1
Representing Turkey
World Championships
Silver medal – second place	2022 Dubai	Women W1 Doubles

Fatma Danabaş (born 28 January 1983) is a Turkish Paralympian archer competing in the Women's compound bow W1 event. She is competing at the 2020 Summer Paralympics in the individual W1 and Mixed team W1 events.

She took the first place in the Mized Team W1 event with her teammaye Bahattin Hekimoğlu at the 7th Fazza Para Archery World Ranking Tournament in Dubai, United Arab Emirates in 2021.

At the 2022 World Para Archery Championships in Dubai, United Arab Emirates, she won the silver medal in the Women W1 Doubles event together with her teammate Nil Mısır.
