= Aiko Okazaki =

Japanese archer (born 1986)

Personal information
- Born: 10 January 1986 (age 40) Ikeda, Japan

Sport
- Sport: Para archery
Medal record
Representing Japan
World Championships
Bronze medal – third place	2019 Den Bosch	Mixed team W1

Aiko Okazaki (born 10 January 1986) is a Japanese Paralympic archer who competes in international archery competitions. She is a World bronze medalist in the mixed team. She competed at the 2020 Summer Paralympics where she reached the quarterfinals in both the individual and team events.

== Life-changing accident ==
In 2005, Okazaki, who was a student at Doshisha University at the time, was involved in a train crash in Fukuchiyama Line. She was a passenger on the first carriage on the seven-car rapid train, she was thrown in the air when the train derailed and she broke her neck and injured her spinal cord.

Okazaki was one of the survivors who underwent the longest period of time in rehabilitation: she spent 377 days, she had spinal cord damage which affected her upper and lower body. She became a full-time wheelchair user with limited use in her abdomen and back.
