= Chen Minyi =

Chinese Paralympic archer (born 1990)

Personal information
- Born: 1 October 1990 (age 35) Dongguan, China

Sport
- Country: China
- Sport: Paralympic archery
Medal record
Paralympic Games
Gold medal – first place	2020 Tokyo	Individual W1
Gold medal – first place	2020 Tokyo	Mixed team W1
Gold medal – first place	2024 Paris	Individual W1
Gold medal – first place	2024 Paris	Mixed team W1
Asian Para Games
Gold medal – first place	2022 Hangzhou	Individual W1

Chen Minyi (Chinese: 陈敏仪; pinyin: Chén Mǐnyí; born 1 October 1990) is a Chinese Paralympic archer.

== Career ==
She won the gold medal in the women's individual W1 event at the 2020 Summer Paralympics held in Tokyo, Japan. She also won the gold medal in the mixed team W1 event.
