= Aleksei Leonov (archer) =

Russian Paralympic archer (born 1987)

Personal information
- Born: 25 March 1987 (age 39) Astrakhan, Russia

Sport
- Country: Russia
- Sport: Paralympic archery
Medal record
Paralympic Games
Bronze medal – third place	2020 Tokyo	Mixed team W1

Aleksei Leonov (born 25 March 1987) is a Russian Paralympic archer. Leonov and Elena Krutova won the bronze medal in the mixed team W1 event at the 2020 Summer Paralympics held in Tokyo, Japan.
