= Nil Mısır =

Turkish para-archer (born 1987)

Personal information
- Nationality: Turkish
- Born: 1987 (age 38–39)

Sport
- Country: Turkey
- Sport: Paralympic archery
- Event: Compound bow W1
- Club: Okçular Vakfı S.K.
Medal record
Women's archery Compound bow W2
Representing Turkey
World Championships
Silver medal – second place	2022 Dubai	Women W1
Silver medal – second place	2022 Dubai	Women W1 Doubles

Nil Mısır (born 1987) is a Turkish Paralympian archer competing in the Women's compound bow W1 event.

== Private life ==
In 2002, Mısır fell down from the fifth floor of her apartment in Fatih, Istanbul. She became paralyzed due to paraplegia and reliant on a wheelchair.

== Sports career ==
Her sports career began when a major Turkish newspaper reported about her life story. She drew the attention of coach Ebru Öztürk Esen of the Turkey Paralympic Sports Federation. Mısır is a member of Olçular Vakfı S.K. in Istanbul.

At the 2022 World Para Archery Championships in Dubai, United Arab Emirates, she won two silver medals: one in the Women W1 event, which is the first achievement of her country in this discipline, and another one in the Women W1 Doubles event together with her teammate Fatma Danabaş.
