= Victoria Rumary =

British Paralympic archer

Personal information
- Born: 28 April 1988 (age 38) Scunthorpe, Great Britain

Sport
- Sport: Paralympic archery
Medal record
Paralympic Games
| Bronze medal – third place | 2020 Tokyo | Individual W1 |

Victoria Rumary (born 28 April 1988) is a British Paralympic archer. She won bronze in the Women's individual W1 at the 2020 Summer Paralympics in Tokyo.
