= Nihat Türkmenoğlu =

Turkish para-archer (born 1988)

Personal information
- Nationality: Turkish
- Born: 5 June 1988 (age 38) Kilis, Turkey

Sport
- Country: Turkey
- Sport: Paralympic archery
- Event: Compound bow W1
Medal record
Men's archery Compound bow W1
Representing Turkey
Paralympic Games
Silver medal – second place	2020 Tokyo	Individual W1
World Championships
Gold medal – first place	2022 Dubai	Men W1 Doubles
Gold medal – first place	2025 Gwangju	Doubles W1
Silver medal – second place	2022 Dubai	Men W1

Nihat Türkmenoğlu (born 5 June 1988) is a Turkish Paralympian archer competing in the Men's compound bow W1 event. He is competing at the 2020 Summer Paralympics in the individual W1 and Mixed team W1 events. He won the silver medal in the Individual W1 event.

He won two medals at the 2022 World Para Archery Championships held in Dubai, United Arab Enirates, a silver medal in the Men W1 event and a gold medal in the Men W1 Doubles event together with his teammate Yiğit Caner Aydın.
