= Asghar Zareeinejad =

Iranian Paralympic athlete

Medal record

Paralympic athletics

Representing Iran

Paralympic Games
Bronze medal – third place	2004 Athens	Shot Put - F40

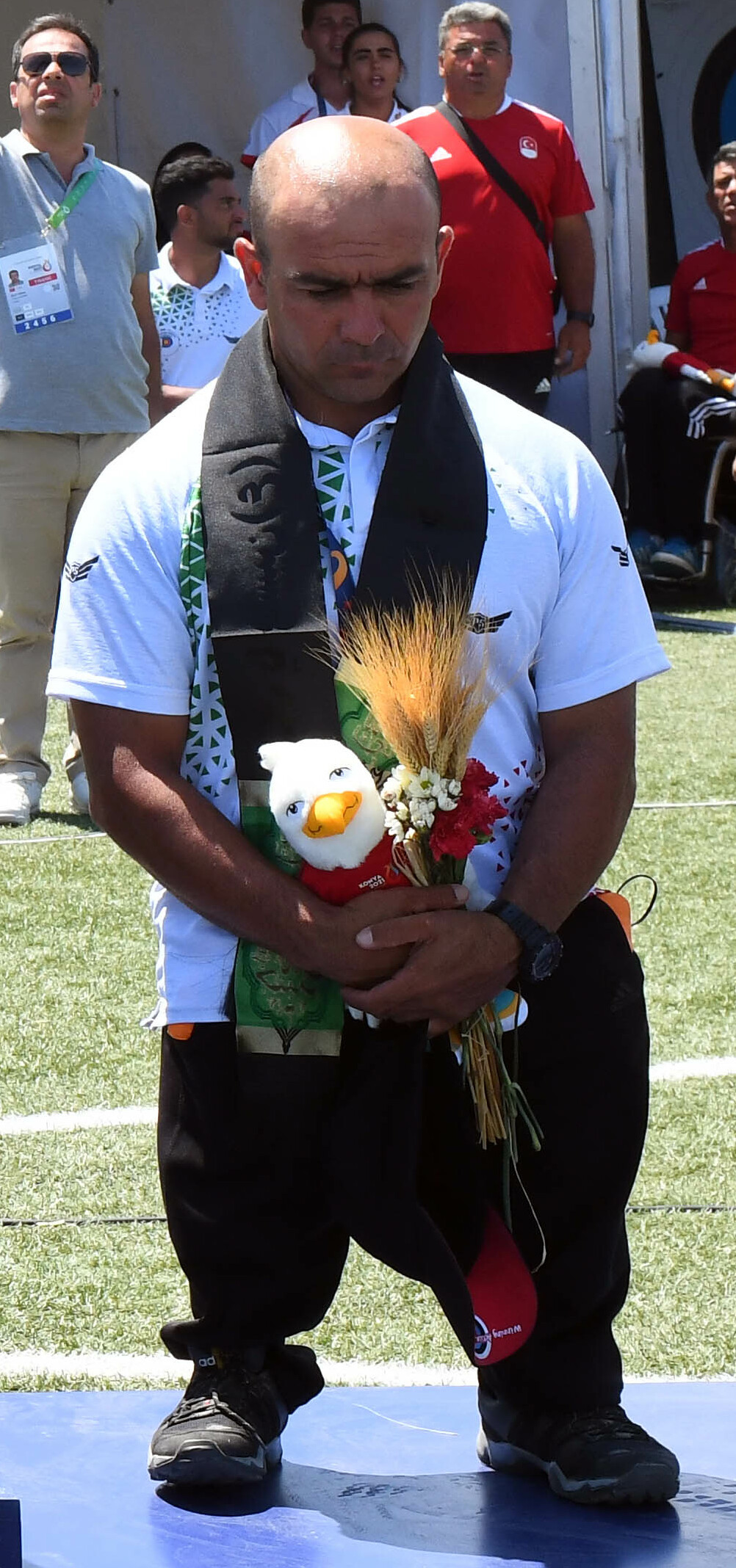
Asghar Zareeinejad

Asghar Zareeinejad is a paralympic athlete and archer from Iran competing mainly in category F40 shot put events.

Asghar competed in Athens in the 2004 Summer Paralympics winning the bronze medal in the F40 shot put.
