= David Drahonínský =

Czech Paralympic archer (born 1982)

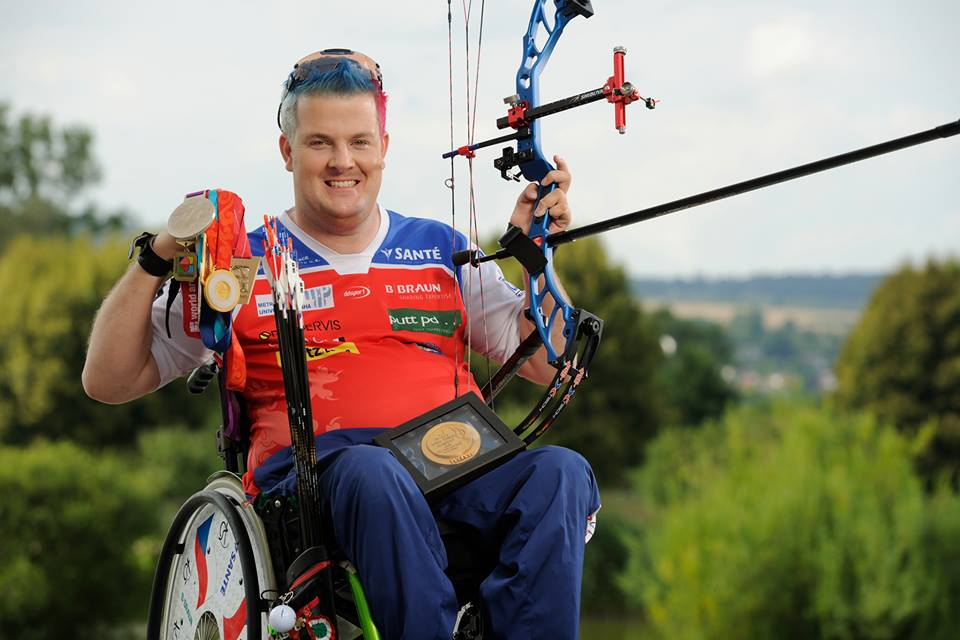

Personal information
- Born: 19 May 1982 (age 44) Kaplice, Czechoslovakia

Sport
- Country: Czech Republic
- Sport: Para archery
Medal record
Archery
Representing Czech Republic
Paralympic Games
Gold medal – first place	2008 Beijing	Individual W1
Gold medal – first place	2020 Tokyo	Individual W1
Silver medal – second place	2012 London	Individual W1
Silver medal – second place	2016 Rio de Janeiro	Individual W1
Silver medal – second place	2020 Tokyo	Mixed team W1
Silver medal – second place	2024 Paris	Mixed team W1
Bronze medal – third place	2016 Rio de Janeiro	Mixed team W1
World Championships
Gold medal – first place	2015 Donaueschingen	Individual W1
Gold medal – first place	2007 Cheongju	Team Men W1
Gold medal – first place	2011 Turin	Team W1
Gold medal – first place	2023 Plzeň	Mixed team W1
Silver medal – second place	2005 Massa Carrara	Team Men W1
Silver medal – second place	2011 Turin	Individual W1
Silver medal – second place	2025 Gwangju	Mixed Team W1
Bronze medal – third place	2013 Bangkok	Individual W1
Bronze medal – third place	2019 Den Bosch	Individual W1
Bronze medal – third place	2022 Dubai	Individual W1
Bronze medal – third place	2022 Dubai	Men's doubles W1
Bronze medal – third place	2022 Dubai	Mixed team W1
Bronze medal – third place	2023 Plzeň	Individual W1
Bronze medal – third place	2023 Plzeň	Men's doubles W1
European Championships
Gold medal – first place	2016 Saint-Jean-de-Mont	Individual W1
Gold medal – first place	2018 Plzeň	Mixed team W1
Gold medal – first place	2022 Rome	Individual W1
Silver medal – second place	2010 Vichy	Individual W1
Silver medal – second place	2018 Plzeň	Individual W1
Bronze medal – third place	2014 Nottwil	Individual W1
Bronze medal – third place	2022 Rome	Mixed team W1

David Drahonínský (born 19 May 1982) is a Czech paralympic archer. He is a double Paralympic champion, three-time European champion and World champion in individual and team events with Tereza Brandtlová and Karel Davídek.

Drahonínský became a paraplegic after he fell from a balcony as a teenager.
