= Elena Krutova =

Russian Paralympic archer (born 1980)

Personal information
- Nationality: Russian
- Born: 19 May 1980 (age 46)

Sport
- Sport: Archery
Medal record
Archery
Representing RPC
Paralympic Games
Bronze medal – third place	2020 Tokyo	Mixed team compound

Elena Krutova (born 19 May 1980) is a Russian Paralympic archer. She competed at the 2020 Summer Paralympics, in Mixed team, winning a bronze medal.

She competed at the 2015 World Archery Para Championships, 2017 World Archery Para Championships, and 2019 World Archery Para Championships, winning a gold medal.
