= 2026 World Archery Para Series =

International archery competition

- League: World Archery Para Series
- Sport: Archery
- Duration: 31 March – TBD 2026

Seasons
- 2027 →

The 2026 World Archery Para Series (also known as the Hyundai World Archery Para Series for sponsorship reasons) is the first edition of the World Archery Para Series, organised by the World Archery. It consists of five stages and is currently being held from 30 March 2026 to TBD 2026.

== Results ==
=== Compound ===
Men's Individual

Stage	Venue	1st place, gold medalist(s)	2nd place, silver medalist(s)	3rd place, bronze medalist(s)
1	(Thailand) Bangkok	Toman Kumar; India	Jonathon Milne; Australia	Shyam Sundar Swami; India
2	(Czech Republic) Nové Město	Christian Seneca; Italy	Ken Swagumilang; Indonesia	Nathan MacQueen; United Kingdom
3	(India) Ahmedabad	Maxime Guérin; France	Ken Swagumilang; Indonesia	Toman Kumar; India
4	(Chile) Santiago	Kevin Polish; United States	Omar Echeverría; Mexico	Reinaldo Charão Ferreira; Brazil
5	(United Arab Emirates) Dubai			

Men's Doubles

Stage	Venue	1st place, gold medalist(s)	2nd place, silver medalist(s)	3rd place, bronze medalist(s)
1	(Thailand) Bangkok	Toman Kumar; Shyam Sundar Swami; India	Wu Chung-hung; Yang Jyun-kai; Chinese Taipei	Patrick French; Jonathon Milne; Australia
2	(Czech Republic) Nové Město	Nathan MacQueen; Jamie Harris; United Kingdom	Kevin Polish; Ephraim Tonn-Bourg; United States	Toman Kumar; Shyam Sundar Swami; India
3	(India) Ahmedabad	Toman Kumar; Shyam Sundar Swami; India	Anwer Aldawod; Abbas Kadhim; Iraq	Bao Yirui; Feng Yue; China
4	(Chile) Santiago	Omar Echeverría; Gerardo Rodríguez; Mexico	Kyle Tremblay; Chad McCormack; Canada	Reinaldo Charão Ferreira; Diogo de Souza; Brazil
5	(United Arab Emirates) Dubai			

Women's Individual

Stage	Venue	1st place, gold medalist(s)	2nd place, silver medalist(s)	3rd place, bronze medalist(s)
1	(Thailand) Bangkok	Payal Nag; India	Sheetal Devi; India	Nur Syahidah Alim; Singapore
2	(Czech Republic) Nové Město	Jodie Grinham; United Kingdom	Sheetal Devi; India	Phoebe Paterson Pine; United Kingdom
3	(India) Ahmedabad	Sheetal Devi; India	Aizada Seidan; Kazakhstan	Sarita; India
4	(Chile) Santiago			
5	(United Arab Emirates) Dubai			

Women's Doubles

Stage	Venue	1st place, gold medalist(s)	2nd place, silver medalist(s)	3rd place, bronze medalist(s)
1	(Thailand) Bangkok	Payal Nag; Sheetal Devi; India	Zhanat Aitimova; Aizada Seidan; Kazakhstan	Wasana Khuthawisap; Phannibha Srathongmaew; Thailand
2	(Czech Republic) Nové Město	Phoebe Paterson Pine; Jodie Grinham; United Kingdom	Maria Andrea Virgilio; Irene Picci; Italy	Sheetal Devi; Payal Nag; India
3	(India) Ahmedabad			
4	(Chile) Santiago			
5	(United Arab Emirates) Dubai			

Mixed Team

Stage	Venue	1st place, gold medalist(s)	2nd place, silver medalist(s)	3rd place, bronze medalist(s)
1	(Thailand) Bangkok	Toman Kumar; Sheetal Devi; India	Arif Firmansyah; Teodora Audi Ayudia Ferelly; Indonesia	Aya Shinohara; Yuya Oe; Japan
2	(Czech Republic) Nové Město	Sheetal Devi; Shyam Sundar Swami; India	Teodora Audi Ayudia Ferelly; Ken Swagumilang; Indonesia	Julie Rugault Chupin; Maxime Guérin; France
3	(India) Ahmedabad			
4	(Chile) Santiago			
5	(United Arab Emirates) Dubai			

=== Recurve ===
Men's Individual

Stage	Venue	1st place, gold medalist(s)	2nd place, silver medalist(s)	3rd place, bronze medalist(s)
1	(Thailand) Bangkok	Kholidin; Indonesia	Harvinder Singh; India	Setiawan; Indonesia
2	(Czech Republic) Nové Město	Stefano Travisani; Italy	Harvinder Singh; India	Guillaume Toucoullet; France
3	(India) Ahmedabad	Samuel Molina; Mexico	Kholidin; Indonesia	Setiawan; Indonesia
4	(Chile) Santiago			
5	(United Arab Emirates) Dubai			

Men's Doubles

Stage	Venue	1st place, gold medalist(s)	2nd place, silver medalist(s)	3rd place, bronze medalist(s)
1	(Thailand) Bangkok	Harvinder Singh; Vijay Sundi; India	Li Bing-yu; Tseng Lung-hui; Chinese Taipei	Kwak Geon-hwi; Lee Ji-hoon; South Korea
2	(Czech Republic) Nové Město	Harvinder Singh; Vijay Sundi; India	Viktor Liaudushchenkov; Ruslan Tsymbaliuk; Ukraine	Stefano Travisani; Davide Bettoni; Italy
3	(India) Ahmedabad	Harvinder Singh; Vijay Sundi; India	David Ivan; Denis Ivan; Slovakia	Xia Lei; Zhu Wenjian; China
4	(Chile) Santiago			
5	(United Arab Emirates) Dubai			

Women's Individual

Stage	Venue	1st place, gold medalist(s)	2nd place, silver medalist(s)	3rd place, bronze medalist(s)
1	(Thailand) Bangkok	Bhawna Choudhary; India	Phattharaphon Pattawaeo; Thailand	Riyanti Ananda; Indonesia
2	(Czech Republic) Nové Město	Bhawna Choudhary; India	Pooja Jatyan; India	Fabiola Dergovics; Brazil
3	(India) Ahmedabad	Somayeh Rahimi Ghahderijani; Iran	Liang Qiurong; China	Bhawna Choudhary; India
4	(Chile) Santiago			
5	(United Arab Emirates) Dubai			

Women's Doubles

Stage	Venue	1st place, gold medalist(s)	2nd place, silver medalist(s)	3rd place, bronze medalist(s)
1	(Thailand) Bangkok	Noviera Ross; Riyanti Ananda; Indonesia	Phattharaphon Pattawaeo; Nampet Phullpol; Thailand	Bhawna Choudhary; Rajshri Rathod; India
2	(Czech Republic) Nové Město	Bhawna Choudhary; Pooja Jatyan; India	Fabiola Dergovics; Lindiara Souza Weischung; Brazil	Flora Kleim; Jule Lammers; Germany
3	(India) Ahmedabad	Chen Yu; Liang Qiurong; China	Bhawna Choudhary; Pooja Jatyan; India	Mohadeseh Babahabib; Somayeh Rahimi Ghahderijani; Iran
4	(Chile) Santiago			
5	(United Arab Emirates) Dubai			

Mixed Team

Stage	Venue	1st place, gold medalist(s)	2nd place, silver medalist(s)	3rd place, bronze medalist(s)
1	(Thailand) Bangkok	Kholidin; Riyanti Ananda; Indonesia	Hanreuchai Netsiri; Phattharaphon Pattawaeo; Thailand	Vijay Sundi; Bhawna Choudhary; India
2	(Czech Republic) Nové Město	Bhawna Choudhary; Harvinder Singh; India	Noviera Ross; Kholidin; Indonesia	Vincenza Petrilli; Stefano Travisani; Italy
3	(India) Ahmedabad			
4	(Chile) Santiago			
5	(United Arab Emirates) Dubai			
