= 2025 World Para Archery Championships – Men's doubles compound open =

Men's doubles compound open at the 2025 World Para Archery Championships
- Venue: Gwangju International Archery Center
- Location: Gwangju, South Korea
- Dates: 24–27 September 2025

Medalists
gold medal	Kevin Polish; Ben Thompson	United States
silver medal	Bao Yirui; Zhang Yicheng	China
bronze medal	Jamie Harris; Nathan MacQueen	Great Britain

The men's doubles compound open competition at the 2025 World Para Archery Championships took place from 24 to 27 September 2025 in Gwangju, South Korea. Ai Xinliang and He Zihao of China were the defending champion. Kevin Polish and Ben Thompson of United States became the new champion.

== Schedule ==
All times are in Korea Standard Time (UTC+09:00).

Date	Time	Round
Monday, 22 September		Official practice
Wednesday, 24 September	09:00	Qualification round
Friday, 26 September	11:00; 11:25 11:50; 12:15	Elimination Round; First round Second round Final Round; Quarter-finals; Semi-finals
Saturday, 27 September	14:48; 15:08	Final Round; Bronze-medal match Gold-medal match

== Qualification Round ==
The qualification round was held on 24 September 2025.

High green denotes a bye in first round.
Light green denotes entering from first round.

Rank	Name	Nation	Score	10+X	X
1	Bao Yirui; Zhang Yicheng	China	1393	98	42
2	Rakesh Kumar; Toman Kumar	India	1385	93	41
3	Kevin Polish; Ben Thompson	United States	1380	88	40
4	Jamie Harris; Nathan MacQueen	United Kingdom	1379	90	44
5	Patrick French; Jonathon Milne	Australia	1364	79	37
6	Arif Firmansyah; Ken Swagumilang	Indonesia	1356	70	24
7	Giampaolo Cancelli; Christian Seneca	Italy	1354	75	32
8	Kenan Babaoğlu; Abdullah Yorulmaz	Turkey	1353	81	32
9	Phiarthanee Teerasak; Comsan Singpirom	Thailand	1343	68	30
10	Daniel Comeau; Kyle Tremblay	Canada	1341	64	29
11	Mark de Gier; Roy Klaassen	Netherlands	1328	62	29
12	Adam Dudka; Maciej Pozycki	Poland	1328	59	21
13	Martin Doric; Marcel Pavlik	Slovakia	1327	62	14
14	Kim Kang-hun; Yun Tae-sung	South Korea	1325	65	18
15	Gerardo Rodriguez; Victor Sardina Viveros	Mexico	1322	53	18
16	Wu Chung-hung; Yang Jyun-kai	Chinese Taipei	1317	55	14
17	Arlan Ateibekov; Sarsenbek Tolebek	Kazakhstan	1292	39	12

== Elimination round ==
The elimination and knockout rounds will take place from September 26 to 27, 2025.

Round of 32
17	Kazakhstan	150^{19}
16	Chinese Taipei	150^{17}

Round of 16
1	China	158
17	Kazakhstan	141
9	Thailand	154
8	Turkey	145
5	Australia	144
12	Poland	149
13	Slovakia	144
4	Great Britain	151
3	United States	153
14	South Korea	152
11	Netherlands	151
6	Indonesia	154
7	Italy	146
10	Canada	150
15	Mexico	148
2	India	151

Quarterfinals
1	China	152
9	Thailand	150
12	Poland	142
4	Great Britain	155
3	United States	157
6	Indonesia	153
10	Canada	152
2	India	150

Semifinals
1	China	157
4	United Kingdom	149
3	United States	152
10	Canada	147

Finals
1	China	153
3	United States	156
Third place
4	Great Britain	144
10	Canada	141
