= Iran at the 2024 Summer Paralympics =

- Flag of Iran
- IPC code: IRI
- NPC: I.R. Iran National Paralympic Committee
- Website: www.paralympic.ir

in Paris, France August 28, 2024 – September 8, 2024
- Competitors: 64 in 10 sports
- Flag bearers (opening): Mohammadreza Mirshafiei; Hajar Safarzadeh
- Flag bearer (closing): Ramezan Salehi
- Medals Ranked 14th: Gold 8 Silver 10 Bronze 7 Total 25

Summer Paralympics appearances (overview)
- 1988; 1992; 1996; 2000; 2004; 2008; 2012; 2016; 2020; 2024

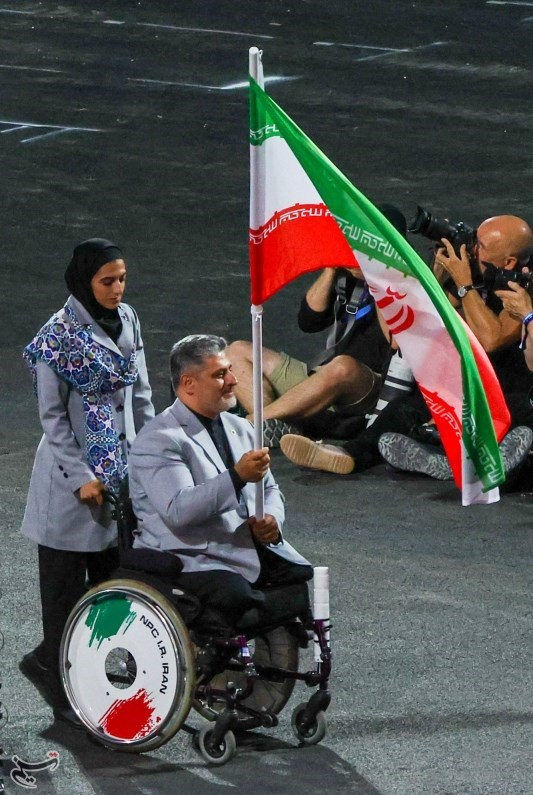
Hajar Safarzadeh (left) and Mohammadreza Mirshafiei (right) during the opening flags parade

Iran competed at the 2024 Summer Paralympics in Paris, France, from 24 August to 5 September 2024. This was their tenth consecutive appearance at the Summer Paralympics since 1988.

The Iranian roster featured a number of past Paralympians and Paralympic medalists, including woman shooter Sareh Javanmardi who won her fifth Paralympic medal with a gold medal, man para-athlete Saeid Afrooz who won his second Paralympic medal with a gold medal and broke World Record in Men's Javelin throw F34, powerlifter Rouhollah Rostami who won his third Paralympic medal with a gold medal and broke World Record in Men's 80kg and Iran men's national sitting volleyball team won their eighth Paralympic gold medal.

In this Paralympic games Fatemeh Hemmati won two silver medals in Archery.

== Medalists ==
| Medal | Name | Sport | Event | Date |
|---|---|---|---|---|
| Gold | Sareh Javanmardi | Shooting | P2 – Women's 10 metre air pistol SH1 | 31 August |
| Gold | Amirhossein Alipour Darbeid | Athletics | Men's Shot put F11 | 2 September |
| Gold | Saeid Afrooz | Athletics | Men's Javelin throw F34 | 4 September |
| Gold | Rouhollah Rostami | Powerlifting | Men's 80kg | 6 September |
| Gold | Iran men's national sitting volleyball team: Hossein Golestani; Hamidreza Abbasifeshki; Davoud Alipourian; Ramezan Salehi; Sadegh Bigdeli; Meysam Hajibabaei Movahhed; Meisam Ali Pour; Isa Zirahi; Majid Lashkarisanami; Mohammed Nemati; Morteza Mehrzad; Mahdi Babadi | Sitting volleyball | Men's tournament | 6 September |
| Gold | Yasin Khosravi | Athletics | Men's Shot put F57 | 6 September |
| Gold | Aliakbar Gharibshahi | Powerlifting | Men's 107kg | 8 September |
| Gold | Ahmad Aminzadeh | Powerlifting | Men's +107kg | 8 September |
| Silver | Zahra Rahimi | Taekwondo | Women's 52 kg | 29 August |
| Silver | Parastoo Habibi | Athletics | Women's Club throw F32 | 30 August |
| Silver | Zafar Zaker | Athletics | Men's Shot put F55 | 30 August |
| Silver | Fatemeh Hemmati | Archery | Women's individual compound open | 31 August |
| Silver | Fatemeh Hemmati; Hadi Nori | Archery | Team compound | 2 September |
| Silver | Mahdi Olad | Athletics | Men's Shot put F11 | 2 September |
| Silver | Hajar Safarzadeh | Athletics | Women's 400 m T12 | 3 September |
| Silver | Hassan Bajoulvand | Athletics | Men's Discus Throw F11 | 5 September |
| Silver | Meysam Banitaba | Judo | Men's -60 kg J1 | 5 September |
| Silver | Ali Pirouj | Athletics | Men's Javelin throw F13 | 5 September |
| Bronze | Alireza Bakht | Taekwondo | Men's 80 kg | 31 August |
| Bronze | Hamed Haghshenas | Taekwondo | Men's +80 kg | 31 August |
| Bronze | Alireza Mokhtari | Athletics | Men's Shot put F53 | 1 September |
| Bronze | Mohammad Reza Arab Ameri | Archery | Men's Individual recurve | 4 September |
| Bronze | Mohsen Bakhtiar | Powerlifting | Men's 59kg | 5 September |
| Bronze | Aliasghar Javanmardi | Athletics | Men's Shot put F35 | 5 September |
| Bronze | Elham Salehi | Athletics | Javelin throw F54 | 7 September |

Medals by date
| Day | Date | 1st place, gold medalist(s) | 2nd place, silver medalist(s) | 3rd place, bronze medalist(s) | Total |
| 1 | 29 August | 0 | 1 | 0 | 1 |
| 2 | 30 August | 0 | 2 | 0 | 2 |
| 3 | 31 August | 1 | 1 | 2 | 4 |
| 4 | 1 September | 0 | 0 | 1 | 1 |
| 5 | 2 September | 1 | 2 | 0 | 3 |
| 6 | 3 September | 0 | 1 | 0 | 1 |
| 7 | 4 September | 1 | 0 | 1 | 2 |
| 8 | 5 September | 0 | 3 | 2 | 5 |
| 9 | 6 September | 3 | 0 | 0 | 3 |
| 10 | 7 September | 0 | 0 | 1 | 1 |
| 11 | 8 September | 2 | 0 | 0 | 2 |
| Total | | 8 | 10 | 7 | 25 |

Medals by sport
| Sport | 1st place, gold medalist(s) | 2nd place, silver medalist(s) | 3rd place, bronze medalist(s) | Total |
| Athletics | 3 | 6 | 3 | 12 |
| Powerlifting | 3 | 0 | 1 | 4 |
| Shooting | 1 | 0 | 0 | 1 |
| Sitting volleyball | 1 | 0 | 0 | 1 |
| Archery | 0 | 2 | 1 | 3 |
| Taekwondo | 0 | 1 | 2 | 3 |
| Judo | 0 | 1 | 0 | 1 |
| Total | 8 | 10 | 7 | 25 |

Medals by gender
| Gender | 1st place, gold medalist(s) | 2nd place, silver medalist(s) | 3rd place, bronze medalist(s) | Total |
| Male | 7 | 5 | 6 | 18 |
| Female | 1 | 4 | 1 | 6 |
| Mixed | 0 | 1 | 0 | 1 |
| Total | 8 | 10 | 7 | 25 |

Multiple medalists
| Name | Sport | 1st place, gold medalist(s) | 2nd place, silver medalist(s) | 3rd place, bronze medalist(s) | Total |
| Fatemeh Hemmati | Archery | 0 | 2 | 0 | 2 |

== Competitors ==
| Sport | Men | Women | Total |
|---|---|---|---|
| Archery | 4 | 2 | 6 |
| Athletics | 15 | 4 | 19 |
| Goalball | 6 | 0 | 6 |
| Judo | 2 | 0 | 2 |
| Paracanoeing | 1 | 1 | 2 |
| Powerlifting | 6 | 0 | 6 |
| Shooting | 1 | 3 | 4 |
| Sitting volleyball | 12 | 0 | 12 |
| Swimming | 2 | 0 | 2 |
| Taekwondo | 3 | 2 | 5 |
| Total | 52 | 12 | 64 |

== Archery ==
Iran entered seven athletes in all event by virtue of their result at the 2023 World Para Archery Championships in Plzeň, Czech Republic; and at the 2024 World Qualification Tournament in Dubai, United Arab Emirates.

Men

| Athlete | Event | Ranking Round | | Round of 32 | Round of 16 | Quarterfinals | Semifinals | Finals | |
| Athlete | Event | Score | Seed | Opposition Score | Opposition Score | Opposition Score | Opposition Score | Opposition Score | Rank |
|---|---|---|---|---|---|---|---|---|---|
| Hadi Nouri | Individual compound | 682 | 22 | Bonacina (ITA); W 141–139 | McQueen (GBR); L 139–140 | Did not advance | | | |
| Alisina Manshaezadeh | Individual compound | 672 | 29 | Tremblay (CAN); L 135–140 | Did not advance | | | | |
| Gholamreza Rahimi | Individual recurve | 640 | 8 | Setiawan (INA); L 4–6 | Did not advance | | | | |
| Mohammad Reza Arab Ameri | Individual recurve | 645 | 5 | Musayev (AZE); W 6–4 | Selvathamby (MAS); W 6–2 | Savaş (TUR); W 6–0 | Singh (IND); L 4–6 | Kenton-Smith (AUS); W 6–0 | 3rd place, bronze medalist(s) |

Women

| Athlete | Event | Ranking Round | | Round of 32 | Round of 16 | Quarterfinals | Semifinals | Finals | |
| Athlete | Event | Score | Seed | Opposition Score | Opposition Score | Opposition Score | Opposition Score | Opposition Score | Rank |
|---|---|---|---|---|---|---|---|---|---|
| Fatemeh Hemmati | Individual compound | 696 | 3 Q | Bye | Lin (CHN); W 142–138 | Rigault-Chupin (FRA); W 143–140 | Pine (GBR); W 146–143 | Cüre (TUR); L 141–144 | 2nd place, silver medalist(s) |
| Somayeh Rahimi | Individual recurve | 574 | 12 | Benhami (FRA); W 6–0 | Poimenidou (GRE); W 6–0 | Yang (CHN); L 0–6 | Did not advance | | |

Mixed

| Athlete | Event | Ranking Round | | Round of 16 | Quarterfinals | Semifinals | Finals | |
| Athlete | Event | Score | Seed | Opposition Score | Opposition Score | Opposition Score | Opposition Score | Rank |
|---|---|---|---|---|---|---|---|---|
| Fatemeh Hemmati; Hadi Nouri | Team compound | 1378 | 4 Q | Bye | Brazil (BRA); W 153–151 | India (IND); W 152–152 SO | Great Britain (GBR); L 151–155 | 2nd place, silver medalist(s) |
| Somayeh Rahimi; Mohammad Reza Arab Ameri | Team recurve | 1219 | 6 | South Korea (KOR); W 5–4 SO | Turkey (TUR); L 2–6 | Did not advance | | |

== Athletics ==
Iranian track and field athletes achieved quota places for the following events based on their results at the 2023 World Championships, 2024 World Championships, or through high performance allocation, as long as they meet the minimum entry standard (MES).

Key

- Note–Ranks given for track events are within the athlete's heat only
- Q = Qualified for the next round
- q = Qualified for the next round as a fastest loser or, in field events, by position without achieving the qualifying target
- DQ = Disqualified
- PR = Paralympic Record
- AR = Area (or continental) Record
- NR = National Record
- SB = Season's Best
- N/A = Round not applicable for the event
- Bye = Athlete not required to compete in round

Track & road events
Women

| Athlete | Event | Heat | | Semifinals | | Final | |
| Athlete | Event | Result | Rank | Result | Rank | Result | Rank |
|---|---|---|---|---|---|---|---|
| Hajar Safarzadeh | 200 m T12 | 25.04 PB | 1 Q | 25.06 | 2 q | 24.91 PB | 4 |
| Hajar Safarzadeh | 400 m T12 | 56.34 AR | 1 Q | 56.07 AR | 1 Q | 55.39 AR | 2nd place, silver medalist(s) |

Field events
Men

| Athlete | Event | Final | |
| Athlete | Event | Distance | Position |
|---|---|---|---|
| Ali Olfatnia | Long jump T37 | 6.04 | 4 |
| Mahdi Olad | Shot put F11 | 13.89 SB | 2nd place, silver medalist(s) |
| Amirhossein Alipour Darbeid | Shot put F11 | 14.78 AR | 1st place, gold medalist(s) |
| Aliasghar Javanmardi | Shot put F35 | 15.84 | 3rd place, bronze medalist(s) |
| Alireza Mokhtari | Shot put F53 | 8.69 SB | 3rd place, bronze medalist(s) |
| Hamed Amiri | Shot put F55 | 11.36 | 6 |
| Zafar Zaker | Shot put F55 | 11.88 | 2nd place, silver medalist(s) |
| Yasin Khosravi | Shot put F57 | 15.96 PR | 1st place, gold medalist(s) |
| Sajad Nikparast | Javelin throw F13 | 60.44 | 5 |
| Ali Pirouj | Javelin throw F13 | 69.74 PB | 2nd place, silver medalist(s) |
| Saeid Afrooz | Javelin throw F34 | 41.16 WR | 1st place, gold medalist(s) |
| Sadegh Beit Sayah | Javelin throw F41 | DQ | —N/a |
| Erfan Bondori Deraznoei | Javelin throw F54 | 29.12 | 5 |
| Amanolah Papi | Javelin throw F57 | 47.63 | 4 |
| Mahdi Olad | Discus Throw F11 | 39.15 | 4 |
| Hassan Bajoulvand | Discus Throw F11 | 41.75 PB | 2nd place, silver medalist(s) |
| Mostafa Marian | Discus Throw F56 | DQ | —N/a |

Women

| Athlete | Event | Final | |
| Athlete | Event | Distance | Position |
|---|---|---|---|
| Elham Salehi | Shot put F54 | 7.46 SB | 5 |
| Elham Salehi | Javelin throw F54 | 16.24 | 3rd place, bronze medalist(s) |
| Hashemiyeh Motaghian | Javelin throw F56 | 21.69 | 5 |
| Parastoo Habibi | Club throw F32 | 26.29 AR | 2nd place, silver medalist(s) |

== Canoeing ==
Iran earned quota places for the following events through the 2023 ICF Canoe Sprint World Championships in Duisburg, Germany; and 2024 ICF Canoe Sprint World Championships in Szeged, Hungary.

| Athlete | Event | Heats | | Semifinal | | Final | |
| Athlete | Event | Time | Rank | Time | Rank | Time | Rank |
|---|---|---|---|---|---|---|---|
| Saeid Hosseinpoor | Men's KL1 | 50.71 | 3 Q | 49.53 | 1 Q | 49.16 | 5 |
| Shahla Behrouzirad | Women's KL3 | 52.70 | 5 Q | 52.12 | 4 | Did not advance | |

== Goalball ==
Summary

| Team | Event | Group Stage | | | | Quarterfinal | Semifinal | Final / BM | |
| Team | Event | Opposition Score | Opposition Score | Opposition Score | Rank | Opposition Score | Opposition Score | Opposition Score | Rank |
|---|---|---|---|---|---|---|---|---|---|
| Iran men's | Men's tournament | France; W 12–8 | Brazil; D 7–7 | United States; L 7–14 | 3 Q | Ukraine; L 3–6 | —N/a | United States; W 4–3 | 5 |

=== Men's tournament ===
The Iranian men's goalball team qualified for the paralympic games by virtue of the results at the 2023 Asia-Pacific Championships in Hangzhou, China.

Team roster

Coach: Bahman Dousti Vala

The following is the Iran squad in the goalball tournament of the 2024 Summer Paralympics.

| No. | Player | Class | Date of birth (age) |
|---|---|---|---|
| 2 | Mohammadmahdi Nafisinasab | B3 | 5 April 2003 (aged 21) |
| 3 | Hassan Jafari | B2 | 25 March 1990 (aged 34) |
| 4 | Mahdi Abbasi | B1 | 2 November 1998 (aged 25) |
| 6 | Nematollah Sarafraz | B2 | 22 June 1985 (aged 39) |
| 7 | Milad Souri | B2 | 30 April 1995 (aged 29) |
| 8 | Mohammad Parnia Jomairan | B3 | 3 December 1991 (aged 32) |

Group play

| Pos | Team | Pld | W | D | L | GF | GA | GD | Pts | Qualification |
|---|---|---|---|---|---|---|---|---|---|---|
| 1 | Brazil | 3 | 2 | 1 | 0 | 28 | 20 | +8 | 7 | Quarter-finals |
| 2 | United States | 3 | 2 | 0 | 1 | 27 | 24 | +3 | 6 | Quarter-finals |
| 3 | Iran | 3 | 1 | 1 | 1 | 26 | 29 | −3 | 4 | Quarter-finals |
| 4 | France (H) | 3 | 0 | 0 | 3 | 17 | 25 | −8 | 0 | Quarter-finals |

Source: Paris 2024
(H) Hosts
30 August 2024
13:15

| France | 8–12 | Iran |
|---|---|---|
| Ouni 0', 9', 11', 15', 22'; Boualia 1'; Baich 13', 17' | Report | Jafari 2', 4', 6', 7', 7', 9', 12', 22'; Sarafraz 10'; Souri 17', 17'; Parnia Jomairan 23' |

South Paris Arena, Paris
Referee:
Juha Vuokila (Finland)
Azhi Mahmood (Iraq)

31 August 2024
17:30

| Brazil | 7–7 | Iran |
|---|---|---|
| Dantas 0', 2', 6', 19'; Sousa 12'; Moreno 14'; Ernesto 22' | Report | Sarafraz 4', 17', 22', 23'; Souri 17', 21', 23' |

South Paris Arena, Paris
Referee:
Patrik Larsson (Sweden)
Juha Vuokila (Finland)

1 September 2024
13:15

| Iran | 7–14 | United States |
|---|---|---|
| Souri 8', 8', 9', 21', 21'; Jafari 16', 17' | Report | Young 0', 1', 7', 16', 18', 20'; Merren 3', 6'; King 6', 8', 9'; Simpson 11', 19', 21' |

South Paris Arena, Paris
Referee:
Sarah Kuper (Germany)
Claude Dagenais (Canada)

Quarter-finals

2 September 2024
15:00

| Ukraine | 6–3 | Iran |
|---|---|---|
| Oliinyk 2', 4', 22', 23'; Strelchyk 9', 23' | Report | Sarafraz 6', 14', 16' |

South Paris Arena, Paris
Referee:
Azhi Mahmood (Iraq)
Raquel Aguado (Spain)

Fifth place match

3 September 2024
10:45

| United States | 3–4 | Iran |
|---|---|---|
| Merren 0'; King 16', 19' | Report | Jafari 3', 22'; Parnia Jomairan 3', 18' |

South Paris Arena, Paris
Referee:
Azhi Mahmood (Iraq)
Claude Dagenais (Canada)

== Judo ==
| Athlete | Event | Round of 16 | Quarterfinals | Semifinals | Repechage round 1 | Repechage round 2 | Final / BM | |
| Athlete | Event | Opposition Result | Opposition Result | Opposition Result | Opposition Result | Opposition Result | Opposition Result | Rank |
|---|---|---|---|---|---|---|---|---|
| Meysam Banitaba | 60 kg J1 | Bye | Zhu (CHN); W 01–00 | Parmar (IND); W 10–00 | Bye | | Bouamer (ALG); L 00–01 | 2nd place, silver medalist(s) |
| Mousa Gholami | 90 kg J1 | Arstanbekov (KAZ); W 10–00 | Powell (GBR); L 00–10 | Did not advance | Bye | Crețul (MDA); L 00–10 | Did not advance | 7 |

== Powerlifting ==
| Athlete | Event | Result | Rank |
Men
| Mohsen Bakhtiar | Men's 59kg | 197 | 3rd place, bronze medalist(s) |
| Amir Jafari | Men's 65kg | 206 | 4 |
| Rouhollah Rostami | Men's 80kg | 242 WR | 1st place, gold medalist(s) |
| Hamed Solhipour | Men's 97kg | 218 | 4 |
| Aliakbar Gharibshahi | Men's 107kg | 252 PR | 1st place, gold medalist(s) |
| Ahmad Aminzadeh | Men's +107kg | 263 | 1st place, gold medalist(s) |

== Shooting ==
Iran entered three para-shooter's after achieved quota places for the following events by virtue of their best finishes at the 2022, 2023 and 2024 world cup, 2022 World Championships, 2023 World Championships and 2022 Asian Para Games as long as they obtained a minimum qualifying score (MQS) by May 31, 2020.

Men

| Athlete | Event | Qualification | | Final | |
| Athlete | Event | Points | Rank | Points | Rank |
|---|---|---|---|---|---|
| Mohammadreza Mirshafiei | P1 – 10 metre air pistol SH1 | 568 | 4 Q | 111.7 | 8 |

Women

| Athlete | Event | Qualification | | Final | |
| Athlete | Event | Points | Rank | Points | Rank |
|---|---|---|---|---|---|
| Sareh Javanmardi | P2 – 10 metre air pistol SH1 | 570 | 1 Q | 236.8 | 1st place, gold medalist(s) |
| Nasrin Shahi | P2 – 10 metre air pistol SH1 | DSQ | | Did not advance | |
| Roghayeh Shojaei | R2 – 10 m air rifle standing SH1 | 617.1 | 9 | Did not advance | |
| Roghayeh Shojaei | R8 – 50 m rifle 3 Positions SH1 | 1151 | 11 | Did not advance | |

Mixed

| Athlete | Event | Qualification | | Final | |
| Athlete | Event | Points | Rank | Points | Rank |
|---|---|---|---|---|---|
| Sareh Javanmardi | P4 – 50 m pistol SH1 | 542 | 4 Q | 159.4 | 5 |
| Mohammadreza Mirshafiei | P4 – 50 m pistol SH1 | 523 | 18 | Did not advance | |

== Sitting volleyball ==
Iran men's sitting volleyball team qualified for games after winning the 2022 Sitting Volleyball World Championships held in Sarajevo, Bosnia and Herzegovina.

Summary

| Team | Event | Group stage | | | | Semifinal | Final / BM / Cl. | |
| Team | Event | Opposition Score | Opposition Score | Opposition Score | Rank | Opposition Score | Opposition Score | Rank |
|---|---|---|---|---|---|---|---|---|
| Iran men's | Men's tournament | Ukraine; W 3–0 | Brazil; W 3–0 | Germany; W 3–0 | 1 | Egypt; W 3–1 | Bosnia and Herzegovina; W 3–1 | 1st place, gold medalist(s) |

=== Men's tournament ===
Roster

The following is the Iran roster in the men's sitting volleyball tournament of the 2024 Summer Paralympics.

| No. | Player | Position | Date of birth (age) |
|---|---|---|---|
| 1 | Hamidreza Abbasifeshki | Libero | 11 December 2000 (aged 23) |
| 2 | Morteza Mehrzad | Opposite | 17 September 1987 (aged 36) |
| 3 | Meisam Ali Pour | Opposite | 13 June 1989 (aged 35) |
| 4 | Davoud Alipourian | Opposite | 6 May 1985 (aged 39) |
| 5 | Meysam Hajibabaei Movahhed | Libero | 25 February 1999 (aged 25) |
| 6 | Mohammed Nemati | Opposite | 19 August 1998 (aged 26) |
| 7 | Sadegh Bigdeli | Middle Blocker | 26 February 1984 (aged 40) |
| 8 | Majid Lashkarisanami | Setter | 6 August 1979 (aged 45) |
| 9 | Hossein Golestani | Middle Blocker | 26 February 1992 (aged 32) |
| 10 | Isa Zirahi | Middle Blocker | 4 June 1979 (aged 45) |
| 11 | Ramezan Salehi | Libero | 11 March 1979 (aged 45) |
| 12 | Mahdi Babadi | Setter | 25 March 1991 (aged 33) |

Group play

| Pos | Team | Pld | W | L | Pts | SW | SL | SR | SPW | SPL | SPR | Qualification |
|---|---|---|---|---|---|---|---|---|---|---|---|---|
| 1 | Iran | 3 | 3 | 0 | 3 | 9 | 0 | MAX | 225 | 132 | 1.705 | Semifinals |
| 2 | Germany | 3 | 2 | 1 | 2 | 6 | 4 | 1.500 | 223 | 213 | 1.047 | Semifinals |
| 3 | Brazil | 3 | 1 | 2 | 1 | 3 | 7 | 0.429 | 205 | 240 | 0.854 | Fifth place match |
| 4 | Ukraine | 3 | 0 | 3 | 0 | 2 | 9 | 0.222 | 201 | 269 | 0.747 | Seventh place match |

Source: Paris 2024

| 30 August 2024; 14:20 | Iran | 3–0 | Ukraine | North Paris Arena, Paris; Attendance: 2,833; Referees: Amina Elsergany (EGY), Benno Meijer (NED) |
| 30 August 2024; 14:20 | (25–13, 25–12, 25–18); P2 Report | | | North Paris Arena, Paris; Attendance: 2,833; Referees: Amina Elsergany (EGY), Benno Meijer (NED) |

| 1 September 2024; 12:00 | Iran | 3–0 | Brazil | North Paris Arena, Paris; Attendance: 3,860; Referees: Ayan Rakhmetov (KAZ), Khalid Shanishah (LBA) |
| 1 September 2024; 12:00 | (25–12, 25–13, 25–19); P2 Report | | | North Paris Arena, Paris; Attendance: 3,860; Referees: Ayan Rakhmetov (KAZ), Khalid Shanishah (LBA) |

| 3 September 2024; 14:00 | Germany | 0–3 | Iran | North Paris Arena, Paris; Attendance: 2,575; Referees: Benno Meijer (NED), Slavisa Kuzmenovic (BIH) |
| 3 September 2024; 14:00 | (16–25, 13–25, 16–25); P2 Report | | | North Paris Arena, Paris; Attendance: 2,575; Referees: Benno Meijer (NED), Slavisa Kuzmenovic (BIH) |

Semifinals

| 5 September 2024; 14:00 | Iran | 3–1 | Egypt | North Paris Arena, Paris; Attendance: 3,216; Referees: Neal Konowalyk (GER), Khalid Shanishah (LBA) |
| 5 September 2024; 14:00 | (25–14, 25–15, 20–25, 25–8); P2 Report | | | North Paris Arena, Paris; Attendance: 3,216; Referees: Neal Konowalyk (GER), Khalid Shanishah (LBA) |

Final

| 6 September 2024; 19:30 | Bosnia and Herzegovina | 1–3 | Iran | North Paris Arena, Paris; Attendance: 4,010; Referees: Andre Calado Ferreira (BRA), Neal Konowalyk (GER) |
| 6 September 2024; 19:30 | (25–22, 28–30, 16–25, 14–25); P2 Report | | | North Paris Arena, Paris; Attendance: 4,010; Referees: Andre Calado Ferreira (BRA), Neal Konowalyk (GER) |

== Swimming ==
| Athlete | Events | Heats | | Final | |
| Athlete | Events | Time | Rank | Time | Rank |
|---|---|---|---|---|---|
| Shahin Izadyar | 100 m breaststroke SB9 | 1:13.04 | 7 | Did not advance | |
| Sina Zeyghaminejad | 100 m breaststroke SB9 | 1:10.58 | 4 Q | 1:12.96 | 8 |
| Sina Zeyghaminejad | 200 m individual medley SM10 | 2:30.51 | 8 | Did not advance | |

== Taekwondo ==
Iran entered six athletes to compete at the Paralympics competition. Four of them qualified for Paris 2024, by virtue of finishing within the top six in the Paralympic rankings in their respective class. The other athlete qualified by winning the gold medal match at the 2024 Asian Qualification Tournament in Tai'an, China.

Men

| Athlete | Event | First round | Quarterfinals | Semifinals | Repechage | Bronze medal match | |
| Athlete | Event | Opposition Result | Opposition Result | Opposition Result | Opposition Result | Opposition Result | Rank |
|---|---|---|---|---|---|---|---|
| Saeid Sadeghianpour | –63 kg | Jagiri (SOL); W 28–2 | Torquato (BRA); L 10–22 | Did not advance | Milad (ISR); L WDR | Did not advance | 7 |
| Alireza Bakht | –80 kg | Bye | Dombayev (KAZ); W 7–5 GDP | Toshtemirov (UZB); L 12–18 | Bye | Spajić (SRB); W 29–6 | 3rd place, bronze medalist(s) |
| Hamed Haghshenas | +80 kg | Bye | Ludong (CHN); W 19–16 | Bush (GBR); L 13–26 | Bye | Omirali (KAZ); W 16–14 | 3rd place, bronze medalist(s) |

Women

| Athlete | Event | First round | Quarterfinals | Semifinals | Repechage | Final / BM | |
| Athlete | Event | Opposition Result | Opposition Result | Opposition Result | Opposition Result | Opposition Result | Rank |
|---|---|---|---|---|---|---|---|
| Maryam Abdollahpour | –47 kg | Bye | Shao (CHN); L 19–9 | Did not advance | Bye | Phuangkitcha (THA); L 4–4 | 5 |
| Zahra Rahimi | –52 kg | Shao (CHN); W 13–2 | Stumpf (BRA); W 6–4 | Japaridze (GEO); W 6–0 | Bye | Ulambayar (MGL); L 2–5 | 2nd place, silver medalist(s) |

== See also ==
- Iran at the Paralympics
- Iran at the 2024 Summer Olympics
