= 2025 World Para Archery Championships – Women's individual compound open =

Women's individual compound open at the 2025 World Para Archery Championships
- Venue: Gwangju International Archery Center
- Location: Gwangju, South Korea
- Dates: 23–28 September

Medalists
gold medal	Sheetal Devi	India
silver medal	Öznur Cüre	Turkey
bronze medal	Jodie Grinham	Great Britain

The women's individual compound open competition at the 2025 World Para Archery Championships, which will take place from 23 to 28 September 2025 in Gwangju, South Korea. Öznur Cüre is the defending champion.

== Schedule ==
All times are in Korea Standard Time (UTC+09:00).

Date	Time	Round
Tuesday, 22 September		Official practice
Wednesday, 23 September	14:00 17:35	Qualification round Elimination Round; First Round (1/48)
Friday, 25 September	14:15; 14:50 15:25; 16:00	Elimination Round; Second round (1/24); Third Round (1/16); Final Round; Quarter-finals; Semi-finals
Saturday, 26 September	16:24; 16:39	Final Round; Bronze-medal match Gold-medal match

== Qualification Round ==
Rank	Name	Nation	Score	10+X	X
1	Öznur Cüre Girdi	Turkey	703	55	17
2	Sheetal Devi	India	687	41	13
3	Jodie Grinham	Great Britain	682	37	17
4	Xu Xueqing	China	680	39	16
5	Stepanida Artakhinova	AIN	679	36	22
6	Jessica Stretton	Great Britain	679	36	14
7	Huang Qiling	China	676	38	13
8	Nur Syahidah Alim	Singapore	673	36	11
9	Eleonora Sarti	Italy	673	34	12
10	Zhang Lu	CHN	670	31	16
11	Kseniya Markitantova	Poland	666	33	11
12	Sarita Adhana	India	666	32	20
13	Teodora Audi Ayudia Ferelly	Indonesia	665	28	8
14	Jane Karla Gögel	Brazil	665	28	7
15	Nur Jannaton Abdul Jalil	Malaysia	659	31	13
16	Jyoti Baliyan	India	658	26	8
17	Lya Sanchez	Mexico	657	28	10
18	Büşra Fatma Ün	Turkey	657	27	13
19	Irene Picci	Italy	651	22	8
20	Phoebe Paterson Pine	Great Britain	649	22	6
21	Choi Na-mi	South Korea	648	24	10
22	Chang I-fen	Chinese Taipei	648	23	12
23	Zhanat Aitimova	Kazakhstan	645	22	4
24	Yu Sun-deok	South Korea	639	17	4
25	Brandi Iannoli	United States	637	27	14
26	Helena Nunes de Moraes	Brazil	635	12	7
27	Ameera Lee	Australia	629	15	4
28	Catalina Bustamante	United States	628	21	10
29	Aizada Seidan	Kazakhstan	628	17	7
30	Kim Mi-soon	South Korea	621	17	3
31	Joma Akter	Bangladesh	619	19	6
32	Liliana Lacova	Slovakia	615	16	6
33	Wendy Gardner	United States	615	14	2
34	Melissa-Anne Tanner	Australia	600	11	1
35	Wasana Khuthawisap	Thailand	564	8	1
36	Larissa Esteban Gomez	Mexico	514	9	3

== Bracket ==
Round of 32
17	Kazakhstan	150^{19}
16	Chinese Taipei	150^{17}

Round of 16
1	China	158
17	Kazakhstan	141
9	Thailand	154
8	Turkey	145
5	Australia	144
12	Poland	149
13	Slovakia	144
4	Great Britain	151
3	United States	153
14	South Korea	152
11	Netherlands	151
6	Indonesia	154
7	Italy	146
10	Canada	150
15	Mexico	148
2	India	151

Quarterfinals
1	China	152
9	Thailand	150
12	Poland	142
4	Great Britain	155
3	United States	157
6	Indonesia	153
10	Canada	152
2	India	150

Semifinals
1	(Turkey) Cüre Girdi	148
5	(Individual Neutral Athletes) Artakhinova	142
3	(United Kingdom) Grinham	140
2	(India) Devi	145

Finals
1	(Turkey) Cüre Girdi	143
2	(India) Devi	146
Third place
5	(Individual Neutral Athletes) Artakhinova	141^{8}
3	(United Kingdom) Grinham	141^{10}
