= Hemmati =

Hemmati is a surname. Notable people with the surname include:

- Abdolnaser Hemmati (born 1956), Iranian academic, politician and economist
- Anahita Hemmati (born 1973), Iranian actress
- Ehsan Hemmati, Iranian film director and writer
- Fatemeh Hemmati (born 2003), Iranian Paralympic archer
- Ferydoon Hemmati (born 1960), Iranian politician
