= Archery at the 2024 Summer Paralympics – Men's individual compound open =

Archery, Men's compound open at the XVII Paralympic Games
- Venue: Les Invalides
- Dates: 29–31 August 2024
- Competitors: 32 from 25 nations

Medalists
1st place, gold medalist(s)		Matt Stutzman	United States
2nd place, silver medalist(s)		Ai Xinliang	China
3rd place, bronze medalist(s)		He Zihao	China

The men's individual compound open archery discipline at the 2024 Summer Paralympics will be contested from 29 to 31 August.

In the ranking rounds each archer shoots 72 arrows, and is seeded according to score. In the knock-out stages each archer shoots three arrows per set against an opponent, the scores being aggregated. Losing semifinalists compete in a bronze medal match.

== Schedule ==
Time		Rounds
29 August		Ranking round
30 August		Round of 1/16
31 August	Morning	Round of 1/8
31 August	Evening	Quarterfinals; Semi finals Medal matches

== Record ==
Records are:

World record	Ai Xinliang (CHN)	709	Plzeň, Czech Republic	18 July 2023
Paralympic record	He Zihao (CHN)	705	Tokyo, Japan	27 August 2021

== Ranking round ==
The ranking round of the men's individual compound open event will be held on 29 August. All archers qualify for the 'round of 32'.

Rank	Archer	Nationality	10	X	Total	Note
1	Ai Xinliang	China	62	31	709	PR, =WR
2	Zihao He	China	57	28	704	
3	Jere Forsberg	Finland	52	25	697	
4	Kyle Tremblay	Canada	50	24	697	
5	Rakesh Kumar	India	50	17	696	
6	Nathan Macqueen	Great Britain	49	20	696	
7	Kevin Polish	United States	47	23	695	
8	Piotr van Montagu	Belgium	51	24	694	
9	Abbas Kadhim	Iraq	49	20	694	
10	Jonathon Milne	Australia	46	14	693	
11	Matteo Bonacina	Italy	45	19	691	
12	Ken Swagumilang	Indonesia	44	20	691	
13	Michael Meier	Austria	44	19	691	
14	Victor Sardina Viveros	Mexico	44	17	688	
15	Shyam Sundar Swami	India	42	16	688	
16	Marcel Pavlik	Slovakia	41	19	688	
17	Maxime Guerin	France	42	17	686	
18	Comsan Singpirom	Thailand	42	17	686	
19	Matt Stutzman	United States	41	19	686	
20	Reinaldo Charão	Brazil	44	17	685	
21	Patrick French	Australia	40	18	684	
22	Hadi Nori	Iran	41	20	682	
23	Yuya Oe	Japan	39	18	682	
24	Thierry Joussaume	France	39	19	679	
25	Serhiy Atamanenko	Ukraine	38	17	678	
26	Fernando Gale Montorio	Spain	35	15	678	
27	Martin Doric	Slovakia	34	12	674	
28	Aliou Drame	Senegal	32	15	672	
29	Alisina Manshaezadeh	Iran	31	11	672	
30	Ka Chuen Ngai	Hong Kong	35	10	670	
31	Daneshen Govinda Rajan	Malaysia	31	14	666	
32	Diego Quesada Arias	Costa Rica	14	5	313	

=WR : Equals the world record PR Paralympic Games record

== Elimination rounds ==
Round of 32
X Ai (CHN)	w/o
D Quesada (CRC)
30 August, Les Invalides, Paris
M Pavlik (SVK)	138
M Guerin (FRA)	143
30 August, Les Invalides, Paris
A Kadhim (IRQ)	141
T Joussaume (FRA)	140
30 August, Les Invalides, Paris
P v. Montagu (BEL)	140
S. Atamanenko (UKR)	139
30 August, Les Invalides, Paris
R Kumar (IND)	136
A Drame (SEN)	131
30 August, Les Invalides, Paris
K Swagumilang (INA)	140
P French (AUS)	138
30 August, Les Invalides, Paris
M Meier (AUT)	142
R Charão (BRA)	135
30 August, Les Invalides, Paris
K Tremblay (CAN)	140
Manshaezadeh (IRI)	135
30 August, Les Invalides, Paris
J Forsberg (FIN)	142
Ka CN (HKG)	137
30 August, Les Invalides, Paris
V. Sardina (MEX)	136
M Stutzman (USA)	142
30 August, Les Invalides, Paris
M Bonacina (ITA)	139
H Nori (IRI)	141
30 August, Les Invalides, Paris
N McQueen (GBR)	142
M Doric (SVK)	138
30 August, Les Invalides, Paris
K Polish (USA)	142
F Gale Montorio (ESP)	138
30 August, Les Invalides, Paris
J Milne (AUS)	147
Oe Y. (JPN)	142
30 August, Les Invalides, Paris
Sundar SS (IND)	138
C Singparom (THA)	138*
30 August, Les Invalides, Paris
ZH Hao (CHN)	144
D Govinda Rajan (MAS)	142

Round of 16
1 September, Les Invalides, Paris
X Ai (CHN)	144
M Guerin (FRA)	139
1 September, Les Invalides, Paris
A Kadhim (IRQ)	141
P v. Montagu (BEL)	143
1 September, Les Invalides, Paris
R Kumar (IND)	144*
K Swagumilang (INA)	144
1 September, Les Invalides, Paris
M Meier (AUT)	139
K Tremblay (CAN)	140
1 September, Les Invalides, Paris
J Forsberg (FIN)	141
M Stutzman (USA)	141*
1 September, Les Invalides, Paris
H Nori (IRI)	139
N McQueen (GBR)	140
1 September, Les Invalides, Paris
K Polish (USA)	144
J Milne (AUS)	142
1 September, Les Invalides, Paris
C Singparom (THA)	142
ZH Hao (CHN)	146

Quarter-finals
1 September, Les Invalides, Paris
X Ai (CHN)	148
P v. Montagu (BEL)	140
1 September, Les Invalides, Paris
R Kumar (IND)	144*
K Tremblay (CAN)	144
1 September, Les Invalides, Paris
M Stutzman (USA)	143
N McQueen (GBR)	142
1 September, Les Invalides, Paris
K Polish (USA)	146
ZH Hao (CHN)	147

Semi-finals
1 September, Les Invalides, Paris
X Ai (CHN)	145
R Kumar (IND)	143
1 September, Les Invalides, Paris
M Stutzman (USA)	148*
ZH Hao (CHN)	148

Gold medal final
1 September, Les Invalides, Paris
X Ai (CHN)	147
M Stutzman (USA)	149
Bronze medal final
1 September, Les Invalides, Paris
R Kumar (IND)	146
ZH Hao (CHN)	147
