= Abdullah Yorulmaz =

Turkish para-archer (born 1983)

Personal information
- Nationality: Turkish
- Born: 1983 (age 42–43) Denizli, Turkey

Sport
- Country: Turkey
- Sport: Paralympic archery
- Event: Compound bow
- Club: Denizli Büyükşehir Belediyespor
- Coached by: Nursel Çokak
Medal record
Men's archery compound bow
Representing Turkey
Tournaments
Gold medal – first place	2024 Dubai	Mixed team

Abdullah Yorulmaz (born 1983) is a Turkish para-archer.

== Personal life ==
Born in 1983, Abdullah Yorulmaz is a native of Denizli, Turkey.

Yorulma started working after his compulsory military service as a commando. In 2007, he had a traffic accident while riding on his motorcycle to the work place. He broke his back, and became paralyzed in both legs. he suffered greatly for years. He had to use a wheelchair for movement.

In 2014, he married Sevgi Yorulmaz (born 1982), also a wheelchair disabled person. After their marriage, his wife started also performing para archery becoming later a national team member.

== Sports career ==
Yorulmaz started archery in 2013, and debuted internationally in 2015. He is coached by Mursel Çokak. He is a member of Denizli Büyükşehir Belediyespor.

He won the gold medal with his teammate Öznur Cüre in the mixed team event at the 8th Fazza Para Archery World Ranking Tournament in Dubai, United Arab Emirates in March 2024.

In April 2025, he won the Turkish Para Archery Cup held in Antalya, and was called up to the national team. He competed at the 2025 World Para Archery Championships in Gwangju, South Korea, with his teammate Kenan Babaoğlu in the doubles compound open event, and placed eight.
