= 2025 World Para Archery Championships – Women's doubles compound open =

Women's doubles compound open at the 2025 World Para Archery Championships
- Venue: Gwangju International Archery Center
- Location: Gwangju, South Korea
- Dates: 24–27 September

Medalists
gold medal	Öznur Cüre; Büşra Ün	Turkey
silver medal	Sheetal Devi; Sarita Adhana	India
bronze medal	Phoebe Paterson Pine; Jessica Stretton	Great Britain

The women's doubles compound open competition at the 2025 World Para Archery Championships, which will take place from 23 to 27 September 2025 in Gwangju, South Korea. Phoebe Paterson Pine and Jodie Grinham of Great Britain are the defending champion.

== Schedule ==
All times are in Korea Standard Time (UTC+09:00).

Date	Time	Round
Monday, 22 September		Official practice
Tuesday, 23 September	14:00	Qualification round
Friday, 26 September	09:15 09:40; 10:05	Elimination Round; First round Final Round; Quarter-finals; Semi-finals
Saturday, 27 September	14:00; 14:20	Final Round; Bronze-medal match Gold-medal match

== Qualification Round ==
The qualification round was held on 23 September 2025.

High green denotes a bye in first round.
Light green denotes entering from first round.

Rank	Name	Nation	Score	10+X	X
1	Phoebe Paterson Pine; Jessica Stretton	Great Britain	1361	73	31
2	Öznur Cüre; Busra Fatma Un	Turkey	1360	82	30
3	Huang Qiling; Xu Xueqing	China	1356	77	29
4	Sheetal Devi; Sarita Adhana	India	1353	73	33
5	Picci Irene; Eleonora Sarti	Italy	1324	56	20
6	Jane Karla Gogel; Helena Nunes de Moraes	Brazil	1300	40	14
7	Choi Na-mi; Yu Sun-deok	South Korea	1287	41	14
8	Zhanat Aitimova; Seidan Aizada	Kazakhstan	1273	39	11
9	Bustamante Catalina; Brandi Iannoli	United States	1265	48	24
10	Ameera Lee; Melissa-Anne Tanner	Australia	1229	26	5
11	Larissa Esteban Gomez; Lya Sanchez	Mexico	1171	37	13

== Elimination round ==
The elimination and knockout rounds will take place from September 26 to 27, 2025.

Round of 16
9	United States	147
8	Kazakhstan	145
11	Mexico	130
6	Brazil	148
7	South Korea	134
10	Australia	138

Quarterfinals
1	Great Britain	157
9	United States	150
5	Italy	150
4	India	154
3	China	153
6	Brazil	140
10	Australia	146
2	Turkey	152

Semifinals
1	Great Britain	150
4	India	152
3	China	147
2	Turkey	155

Finals
4	India	149
2	Turkey	152
Bronze medal match
1	Great Britain	155
3	China	141
