= Marcos Blanco =

Venezuelan judoka (born 1992)

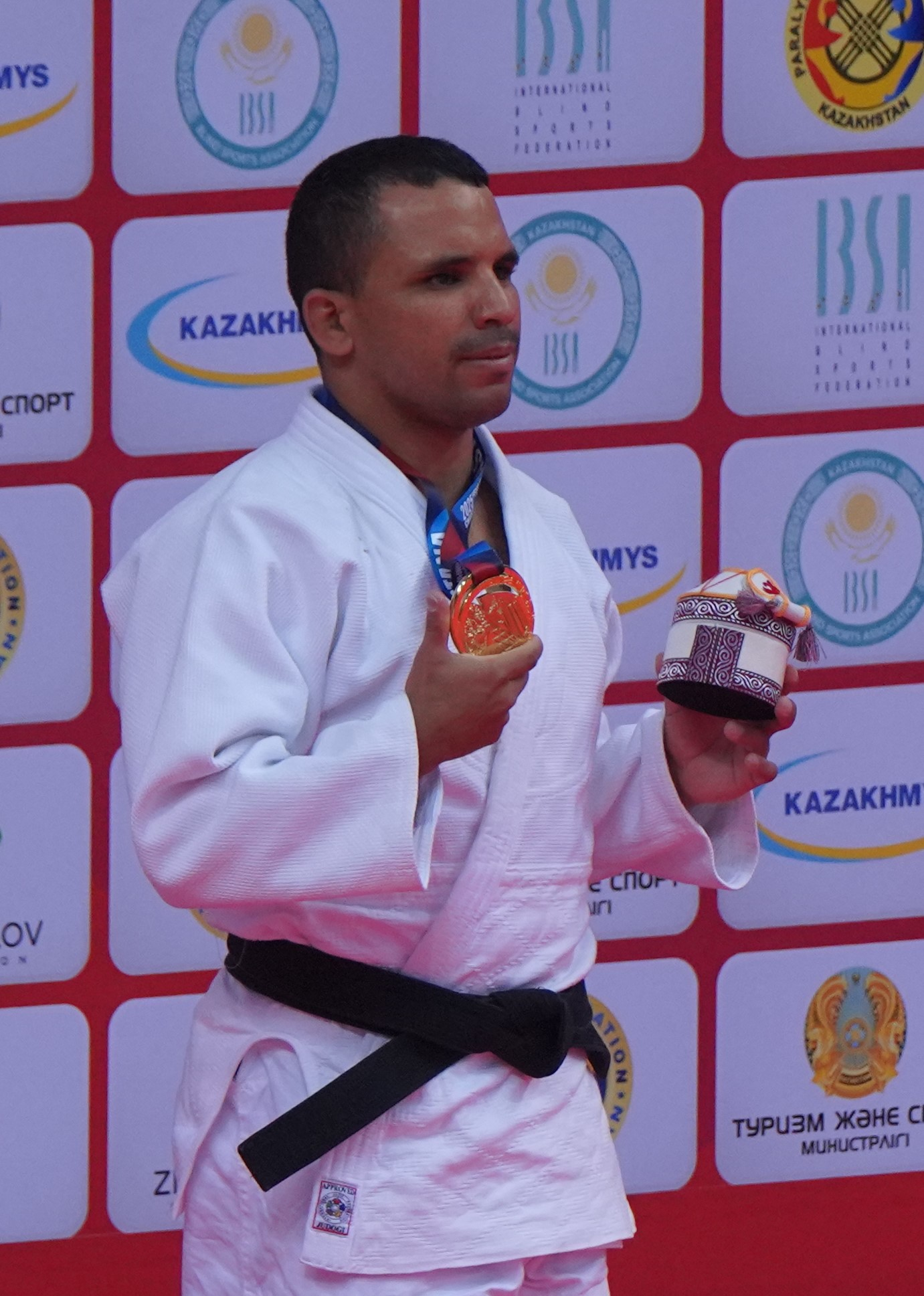

Personal information
- Born: 4 March 1992 (age 34) Higuerote, Venezuela
- Occupation: Judoka

Sport
- Country: Venezuela
- Sport: Para judo
- Disability class: J1
- Weight class: −60 kg

Achievements and titles
- Paralympic Games: (bronze) (2024)
Medal record
Men's para judo
Representing Venezuela
Paralympic Games
| Bronze medal – third place | 2024 Paris | −60 kg J1 |
Parapan American Games
| Silver medal – second place | 2019 Lima | 60 kg |
- Updated on 5 September 2024

Marcos Dennis Blanco (born 4 March 1992) is a Venezuelan judoka. He competed at the 2024 Summer Paralympics and won the bronze medal in the men's 60 kg J1 event.
