= Judo at the 2024 Summer Paralympics – Men's 60 kg J1 =

Paralympical event

Judo – Men's 60 kg J1 at the XVII Paralympic Games
- Venue: Champ de Mars, Paris
- Date: 5 September 2024
- Competitors: 10 from 10 nations

Medalists
1st place, gold medalist(s)		Abdelkader Bouamer	Algeria
2nd place, silver medalist(s)		Meysam Banitaba	Iran
3rd place, bronze medalist(s)		Kapil Parmar	India
3rd place, bronze medalist(s)		Marcos Blanco	Venezuela

The men's 60 kg J1 judo competition at the 2024 Summer Paralympics was held on 5 September 2024 at the Champ de Mars.

== Classification ==
For the first time, Paralympic judo was divided into two classifications:

- J1 – An athlete's vision impairment must result in a visual acuity of less than or equal to LogMAR 2.6 in binocular vision.
- J2 – The athlete's visual acuity must be within a range between LogMAR 1.3 and 2.5 with binocular vision, or with a binocular visual field of 60 degrees or less in diameter.

This event was in the J1 classification.

== Results ==
=== Bracket ===
Round of 16
Henry Borges (URU)	00
Zhu Shiwen (CHN)	01
A Bouamer (ALG)	10
Vitoon Kongsuk (THA)	00

Quarter finals
Kapil Parmar (IND)	10
Marcos Blanco (VEN)	00
Meysam Banitaba (IRI)	10
Zhu Shiwen (CHN)	00
A Bouamer (ALG)	10
Elielton de Oliveira (BRA)	0
Miguel Vieira (POR)	00
Junaedi (INA)	10

Semi finals
Kapil Parmar (IND)	0
Meysam Banitaba (IRI)	10
A Bouamer (ALG)	1
Junaedi (INA)	0

Final
Meysam Banitaba (IRI)	0
A Bouamer (ALG)	1

=== Repechage ===
Repechage 2
Marcos Blanco (VEN)	10
Zhu Shiwen (CHN)	1

Bronze medal
Junaedi (INA)	0
Marcos Blanco (VEN)	10

Repechage 1
Vitoon Kongsuk (THA)	00
Elielton de Oliveira (BRA)	10

Repechage 2
Elielton de Oliveira (BRA)	10
Miguel Vieira (POR)	00s1

Bronze medal
Elielton de Oliveira (BRA)	00
Kapil Parmar (IND)	10
