= Payal Nag =

Indian para archer

Payal Nag (born 2008) is an Indian para archer from Odisha. She is a quadruple amputee.

== Early life ==
Nag is from Balangir, Odisha. Her father is a daily wage mason. In Class 3, she lost all her four limbs in an electrocution accident at the age of eight. Four years after the accident, she was admitted to an orphanage, Parvatigiri Balniketan, in Balangir, with the help of the district collector. It was Sheetal Devi's coach Kuldeep Vedwan, who also spotted and trained her at the Maata Vaishno Devi Shrine Archery Academy in Katra. Her elder sister Varsha Nag, stays at the academy as her caregiver.

== Career ==
She won a gold medal beating Sheetal Devi in the final at the World Archery Para Series in Bangkok on 4 April 2026. She beat the World No.1 Devi 139–136 in the Compound event final in only her second international event. She made her international debut at the Dubai 2025 Asian Youth Para Games. In December 2025, she beat her idol, Sheetal Devi for the first time at the Para Archery Nationals in Jaipur. In her first major event in March 2025, she won a Compound Open silver at the Khelo India Para Games in Delhi.
