= Sheetal Devi =

Indian para-archer (born 2007)

- Devi in 2024

Personal information
- Born: 10 January 2007 (age 19) Loidhar, Kishtwar, Jammu & Kashmir, India

Sport
- Sport: Para-archery
- Rank: 1 (26 October 2026)
- Event: Compound

Achievements and titles
- Highest world ranking: 1 (27 November 2023)
- Personal bests: 704 (PCW, 19 October 2026); 1402 WR (PCX, 19 October 2026)
Medal record
Women's compound para-archery
Representing India
Event	1st	2nd	3rd
Paralympic Games	0	0	1
World Championships	1	2	1
World Para Series	4	2	2
Asian Para Games	4	1	0
Asian Championships	1	1	0
Total	10	6	4
Paralympic Games
Bronze medal – third place	2024 Paris	Mixed team
World Championships
Gold medal – first place	2025 Gwangju	Individual
Silver medal – second place	2023 Plzeň	Individual
Silver medal – second place	2025 Gwangju	Doubles
Bronze medal – third place	2025 Gwangju	Mixed team
World Para Series
Gold medal – first place	2026 Bangkok	Doubles
Gold medal – first place	2026 Bangkok	Mixed team
Gold medal – first place	2026 Nové Město	Mixed team
Gold medal – first place	2026 Ahmedabad	Individual
Silver medal – second place	2026 Bangkok	Individual
Silver medal – second place	2026 Nové Město	Individual
Bronze medal – third place	2026 Nové Město	Doubles
Bronze medal – third place	2026 Ahmedabad	Mixed team
Asian Para Games
Gold medal – first place	2022 Hangzhou	Individual
Gold medal – first place	2022 Hangzhou	Mixed team
Silver medal – second place	2022 Hangzhou	Doubles
Gold medal – first place	2026 Aichi-Nagoya	Mixed team
Gold medal – first place	2026 Aichi-Nagoya	Individual
- Updated on 28 October 2026

Sheetal Devi (born 10 January 2007) is an Indian female para-archer who competes in compound archery events. She is India's youngest Paralympic medalist, winning a bronze in the mixed team compound event at the 2024 Paris Paralympics. She has won gold medals at all the major competitions, including the World Championships, Asian Championships and the Asian Para Games. She is also the recipient of the Arjuna Award in 2023.

== Early life ==
Sheetal Devi was born on 10 January 2007 in Loidhar, Kishtwar district of Jammu & Kashmir. Devi was born with phocomelia, a rare medical condition resulting in the absence of arms. She is the first and only female para-archery champion without upper limbs.

In 2020, she came to the attention of the Indian Army's Rashtriya Rifles unit, which facilitated her participation in Operation Sadbhavana initiatives, providing opportunities to develop her skills. The unit supported her education and arranged medical assistance, including treatment in Bengaluru. During this period, she received support from Meghna Girish, actor Anupam Kher, and Preeti Rai of the NGO The Being You. Upon her return to Jammu and Kashmir, the Rashtriya Rifles unit assisted in her enrolment at the Shri Mata Vaishno Devi Shrine Board Sports Complex. She later progressed in her sporting career from this training base.

== Career ==
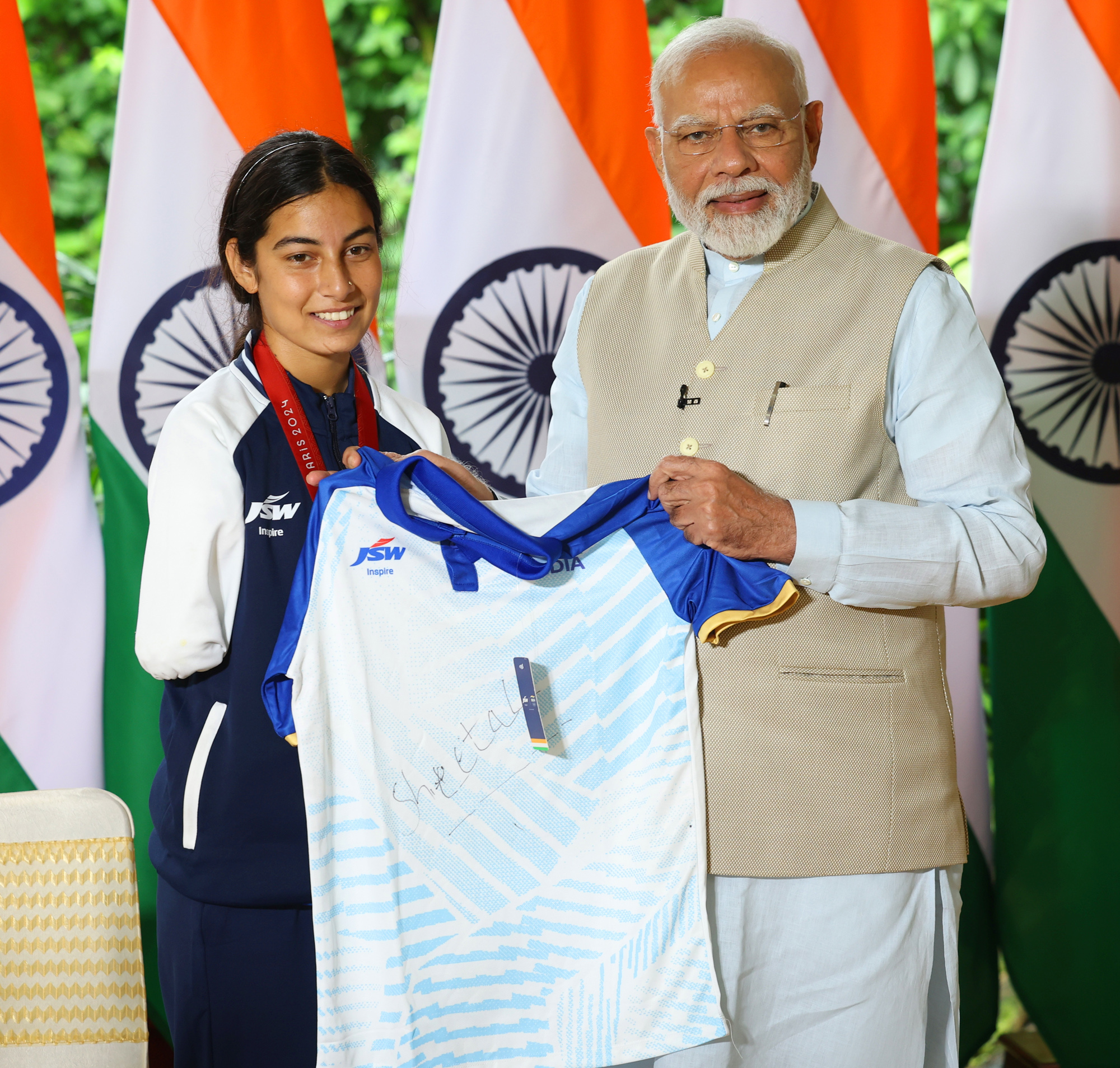
Sheetal Devi with Prime Minister Narendra Modi in 2024.

After the efforts by the Indian Army, Sheetal Devi caught the attention of coaches Abhilasha Chaudhary and Kuldeep Baidwan, who were impressed by her confidence and decided to begin her training. Although they initially considered using prosthetics to assist her, doctors advised that it was not possible in her case. Devi's ability to climb trees using only her legs had significantly developed her core strength, which became important in her training.

The coaches had never trained someone without arms for archery before. However, after researching and learning about Matt Stutzman, an archer who uses his legs, they began her training. Within 11 months of training, Devi competed in the women's compound bow event at the 2022 Asian Para Games, where she won two gold medals for India. She secured gold in the mixed doubles and women's individual, in addition to a silver medal in the women's double compound event, which moved her to the top of the para world archery rankings in the women's compound open category.

On 9 January 2024, Devi received the Arjuna Award 2023 from the President of India, Droupadi Murmu at Rashtrapati Bhavan. She became the youngest athlete to compete in women's para archery at the 2024 Summer Paralympics. She surpassed the previous world record of 698 points in the ranking round with an impressive score of 703, qualifying for the 1/16 elimination round in the women's individual compound open category. Despite being eliminated by just 1 point in the 1/8 elimination round, she overcame the setback by winning a bronze medal in the mixed team compound open category alongside Rakesh Kumar at the 2024 Summer Paralympics. On 28 September 2025, Devi won gold at the 2025 World Para Archery Championships, Gwangju defeating Oznur Cure, the defending champion and the World No.1 by a scoreline of 146-143 becoming the first armless woman to be crowned champion.

In September 2026, Devi and Rakesh Kumar broke the qualification world record in the mixed team compound open event at the Ahmedabad leg of the 2026 World Archery Para Series, scoring 1400 points and surpassing their previous world record of 1399 points set during the 2024 Summer Paralympics. She also won her first individual gold medal at the World Archery Para Series in the same leg. She also qualified to represent India at the 2026 Asian Para Games.

At the 2026 Asian Para Games in Aichi-Nagoya, Devi won gold in the women’s compound individual and compound mixed team events alongside Toman Kumar equaling the world record with 704 out of 720 points in the qualification round, bettering her own Asian record and setting a new Asian Para Games record in the process.

== Awards ==
- Arjuna Award (2023) by the Government of India
- Best Youth Athlete of the Year 2023 by Asian Paralympic Committee
- Best Women Para Archer of the Year 2023 by World Archery
- Female Para Sportsperson of the Year 2025 by Times of India Sports Awards
- Para Archer of the Year 2025 by World Archery
