= Archery at the 2024 Summer Paralympics – Mixed team compound =

2024 Paralympic archery event

Mixed team compound open at the XVII Paralympic Games
- Paralympic Archery
- Venue: Les Invalides, Paris
- Dates: 29-31 August 2024
- Competitors: 24 from 12 nations

Medalists
1st place, gold medalist(s)		Jodie Grinham; Nathan McQueen	Great Britain
2nd place, silver medalist(s)		Fatemeh Hemmati; Hadi Nori	Iran
3rd place, bronze medalist(s)		Rakesh Kumar; Sheetal Devi	India

The Mixed team compound open is one of three team events held in the 2024 Summer Paralympics in Paris, France. It contains twelve teams of one man and one woman, the ranking round having been held on 29 August and the knockout stage on 31 August.

Following the ranking round, teams ranked first to fourth enter at the quarterfinals while the fifth to twelfth teams begin at the 'round of 16'.

== Team compound Open ==
=== Records ===
Type	Name	Mark	Location	Date
WR	China; Wang Sijun; Wu Chunyan	1287	Bangkok	21 October 2019
PR	China; Zhao Lixue; Wu Chunyan	1281	Tokyo	27 August 2021

=== Ranking Round ===
The points are calculated by combining the score, Xs, and 10s of the two archers, in their team, from their individual ranking round events.

Rank	Nation	Archers	Individual Scores	Aggregate Total	Notes
1	India	Sheetal Devi	703	1399	WR Q
1	India	Rakesh Kumar	696	1399	WR Q
2	Great Britain	Jodie Grinham	693	1389	Q
2	Great Britain	Nathan McQueen	696	1389	Q
3	China	Zhou Jiamin	676	1385	Q
3	China	Ai Xinliang	709	1385	Q
4	Iran	Fatemeh Hemmati	696	1378	Q
4	Iran	Hadi Nori	682	1378	Q
5	Brazil	Jane Karla Gogel	691	1376	q
5	Brazil	Reinaldo Vagner Charão	685	1376	q
6	Italy	Eleonora Sarti	684	1375	q
6	Italy	Matteo Bonacina	691	1375	q
7	France	Julie Rigault Chupin	689	1375	q
7	France	Maxime Guerin	686	1375	q
8	Iraq	Sarah al-Hameed	669	1363	q
8	Iraq	Abbas Kadhim	694	1363	q
9	Indonesia	Teodora Audi Ayudia Ferelly	662	1353	q
9	Indonesia	Ken Swagumilang	691	1353	q
10	Australia	Ameera Lee	649	1342	q
10	Australia	Jonathon Milne	693	1342	q
11	Malaysia	Nur Jannaton Abdul Jalil	646	1312	q
11	Malaysia	Daneshen Govinda Rajan	666	1312	q
12	Costa Rica	Maria del Pilar Riveros	681	994	q
12	Costa Rica	Diego Quesada Arias	313	994	q

WR : World record Q : Qualified directly to quarterfinal round q: Qualified for round of 16

=== Competition bracket ===
Round of 16
8	Iraq	149
9	Indonesia	150
12	Costa Rica	DNS
5	Brazil
6	Italy	147
11	Malaysia	141
10	Australia	142
7	France	134

Quarterfinals
1	India	154
9	Indonesia	143
5	Brazil	151
4	Iran	153
3	China	151
6	Italy	151 SO
10	Australia	141
2	Great Britain	150

Semifinals
1	India	152
4	Iran	152 SO
6	Italy	149
2	Great Britain	156

Finals
4	Iran (silver)	151
2	Great Britain (gold)	155
Bronze medal match
1	India (bronze)	156
6	Italy	155
