= Archery at the 2024 Summer Paralympics – Women's individual compound open =

Archery, Women's compound open at the XVII Paralympic Games
- Venue: Les Invalides
- Dates: 29–1 September 2024
- Competitors: 28 from 21 nations

Medalists
1st place, gold medalist(s)		Öznur Cüre	Turkey
2nd place, silver medalist(s)		Fatemeh Hemmati	Iran
3rd place, bronze medalist(s)		Jodie Grinham	Great Britain

The women's individual compound open archery discipline at the 2024 Summer Paralympics will be contested from 29 August to 1 September. 28 archers from 21 nations will compete

In the ranking rounds each archer shoots 72 arrows, and is seeded according to score. In the single elimination knock-out stages each archer shoots three arrows per set against an opponent, the scores being aggregated. Losing semifinalists compete in a bronze medal match.

The event was open to archers with an impairment in either the top or bottom half or one side of their bodies.

== Record ==
Records are:

World record	Phoebe Paterson Pine (GBR)	698	Oxfordshire, Great Britain	3 August 2024
Paralympic record	Jessica Stretton (GBR)	694	Tokyo, Japan	27 August 2021

== Ranking round ==
The ranking round of the women's individual recurve event was held on 29 August. The top 4 archers received a bye to the 1/8 round.

Rank	Archer	Nationality	10	X	Total	Note
1	Öznur Cüre	Turkey	56	29	704	WR Q
2	Sheetal Devi	India	59	24	703	Q
3	Fatemeh Hemmati	Iran	48	22	696	Q
4	Jodie Grinham	Great Britain	47	14	693	Q
5	Jane Karla Gögel	Brazil	47	15	691	
6	Julie Rigault-Chupin	France	42	16	689	
7	Phoebe Paterson Pine	Great Britain	40	19	688	
8	Eleonora Sarti	Italy	39	15	684	
9	Sarita Adhana	India	40	15	682	
10	María Riveros	Costa Rica	38	16	681	
11	Nur Syahidah Alim	Singapore	35	11	677	
12	Zhou Jiamin	China	34	14	676	
13	Kseniya Markitantova	Poland	34	11	676	
14	Lin Yueshan	China	35	16	670	
15	Mariana Zúñiga	Chile	32	9	670	
16	Sarah Al-Hameed	Iraq	31	11	669	
17	Teodora Ferelly	Indonesia	30	14	662	
18	Choi Na-mi	South Korea	28	10	661	
19	Jeong Jin-young	South Korea	31	7	659	
20	Joma Akter	Bangladesh	28	4	658	
21	Kerrie Leonard	Ireland	28	11	653	
22	Ameera Lee	Australia	15	6	649	
23	Melissa Tanner	Australia	21	8	646	
24	Nur Jannaton Abdul Jalil	Malaysia	20	7	646	
25	Giulia Pesci	Italy	22	6	644	
26	Diana Gonzabay	Ecuador	21	5	637	
27	Sevgi Yorulmaz	Turkey	17	7	634	
28	Agustina Bantiloc	Philippines	17	2	618	

WR : world record Q : Bye to 1/8 round:

== Elimination rounds ==
1/16 Elimination Round
1	Cüre (TUR)	Bye
17	Ferelly (INA)	129
16	Al-Hameed (IRQ)	127
9	Adhana (IND)	138
24	Jannaton (MAS)	124
25	Pesci (ITA)	126
8	Sarti (ITA)	136
5	Gögel (BRA)	142
28	Bantiloc (PHI)	127
21	Leonard (IRL)	135
12	Zhou (CHN)	140
13	Markitantova (POL)	138(10+)
20	Akter (BAN)	138(10)
4	Grinham (GBR)	Bye
3	Hemmati (IRI)	Bye
19	Jeong (KOR)	134
14	Lin (CHN)	140
11	Alim (SGP)	133
22	Lee (AUS)	135
27	Yorulmaz (TUR)	127
6	Rigault-Chupin (FRA)	130
7	Paterson Pine (GBR)	142
26	Gonzabay (ECU)	141
23	Tanner (AUS)	137
10	Riveros (CRC)	133
15	Zúñiga (CHI)	139
18	Choi (KOR)	135
2	Devi (IND)	Bye

1/8 Elimination Round
1	Cüre (TUR)	143
17	Ferelly (INA)	128
9	Adhana (IND)	141
8	Sarti (ITA)	135
5	Gögel (BRA)	139
12	Zhou (CHN)	136
13	Markitantova (POL)	141
4	Grinham (GBR)	142
3	Hemmati (IRI)	142
14	Lin (CHN)	138
22	Lee (AUS)	132
6	Rigault-Chupin (FRA)	140
7	Paterson Pine (GBR)	140
23	Tanner (AUS)	136
15	Zúñiga (CHI)	138
2	Devi (IND)	137

Quarterfinals
1	Cüre (TUR)	145
9	Adhana (IND)	140
5	Gögel (BRA)	141
4	Grinham (GBR)	143
3	Hemmati (IRI)	143
6	Rigault-Chupin (FRA)	140
7	Paterson Pine (GBR)	143
15	Zúñiga (CHI)	138

Semifinals
1	Cüre (TUR)	145
4	Grinham (GBR)	143
3	Hemmati (IRI)	146
7	Paterson Pine (GBR)	143

Gold final
1	Cüre (TUR)	144
3	Hemmati (IRI)	141
Bronze final
4	Grinham (GBR)	142
7	Paterson Pine (GBR)	141
