= Ehsan Hemmati =

Iranian film director

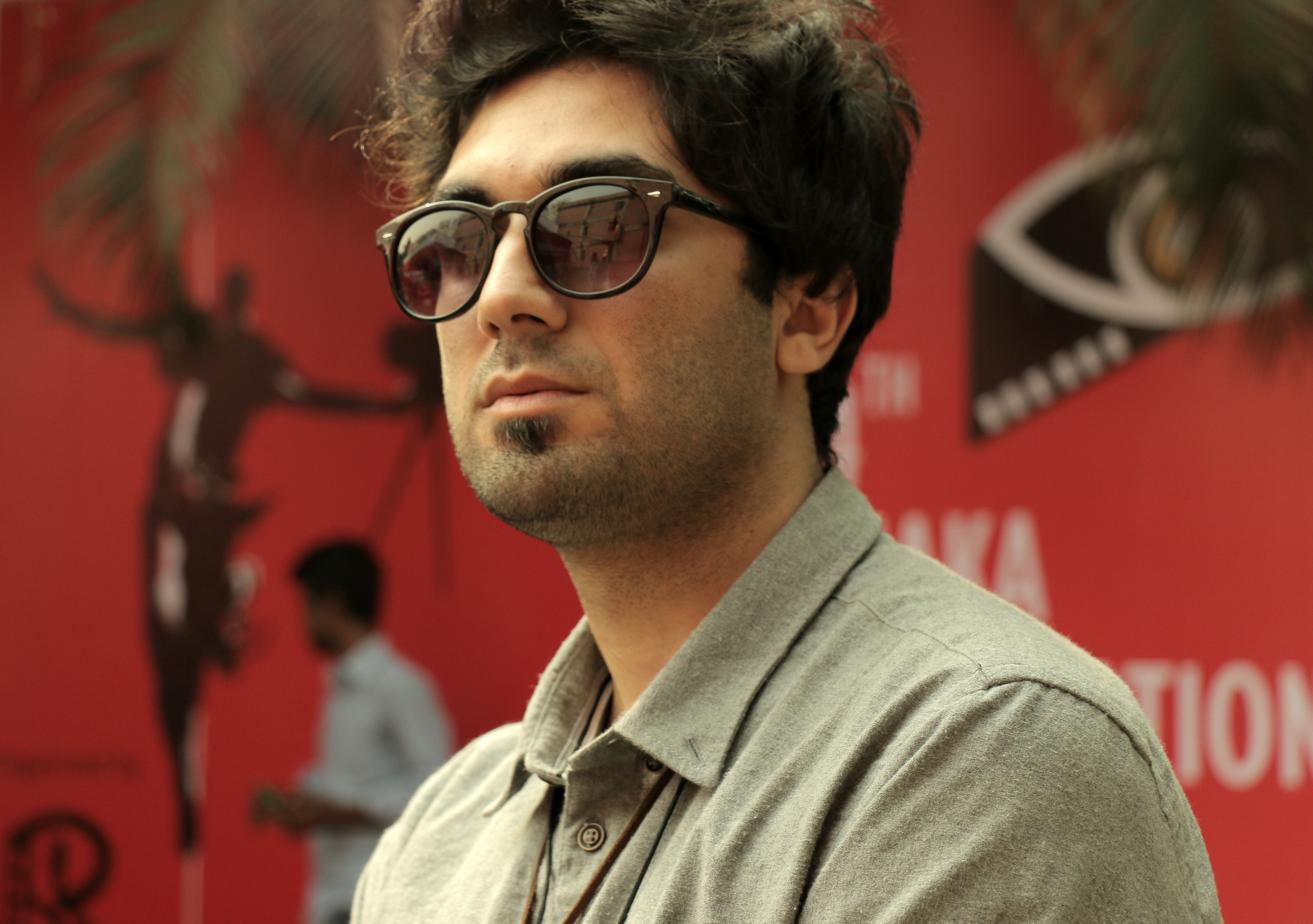
- Hemmati at the Dhaka International Film Festival
- Born: Shiraz, Iran
- Education: Ph.D. in Philosophy of Art in the Aesthetics of Cinema and M.A. in Cinema from Tehran University of Art and also B.A in Film Directing.
- Occupations: Film Director, Writer and Film Producer
- Notable work: A Side to Exit One Day Later PTSD 11
- Website: https://www.ehsanhemmati.com https://www.imdb.com/name/nm15707994/?ref_=tt_ov_1_1

Ehsan Hemmati (Persian: احسان همتی) is a Film Director and Writer from Iran. He holds a Ph.D. in Philosophy of Art with a specialization in the aesthetics of cinema, an M.A. in Cinema from Tehran University of Arts, and B.A. in Film Directing. Hemmati’s academic and artistic work focuses on film theory, the philosophy of art, and the psychological dimensions of cinematic experience.

== Career ==
Hemmati is a Ph.D. in the Philosophy of Art in the Aesthetics of Cinema. He holds a Master of Arts (M.A.) degree in Cinema from Tehran University of Arts and a Bachelor of Arts (B.A.) degree in Film Directing. He is also a researcher in Film Studies, the Philosophy of Art, and the psychological aspects of cinematic activities. Hemmati began his filmmaking career within the academic sphere, specializing in the Psychological Drama genre.

Ehsan Hemmati was nominated for Best Screenplay at the 19th Grand OFF International Short Film Festival in Warsaw, Poland, for his film A Side to Exit.

His film A Side to Exit was nominated for Best Short Film at the 24th Hafez Awards (Donyaye Tasvir Cinema and Television Awards).

He participated in the 42nd Fajr International Film Festival with the movie A Side to Exit. It is also selected in the 40th Tehran International Short Film Festival.

A Side to Exit is a film without dialogue that narrates violent spaces and activities that play a huge role in creating individual and collective violence at different levels of human society and can be a suitable platform for creating all kinds of mental disorders and mental collapse.

His film One Day Later tells a story about paranoid doubt and doubt caused by a lie in the context of social and family factors. The film One Day Later was selected at the 33rd Tehran International Short Film Festival and won the award for best set and costume design, won the award for best female actor, won the award for best male actor and won the third award for best film from the audience's point of view at the South Film and Art Festival in the country became Chile. It is also selected for the Big Bang Panorama International Short Film Festival, Athens, Greece, selected for the 12th Romanian Film Festival, selected for the 15th International Film Festival Dhaka, Bangladesh.

In the psychodrama genre, he directed PTSD 11, film about post-traumatic stress disorder. This film is selected for the 31st Tehran International Short Film Festival and the 14th Dhaka International Film Festival in Bangladesh. The movie PTSD 11 won the award for the best film editing and sound from the 50th Aftab regional film festival in Arak, Iran.

== Filmography ==
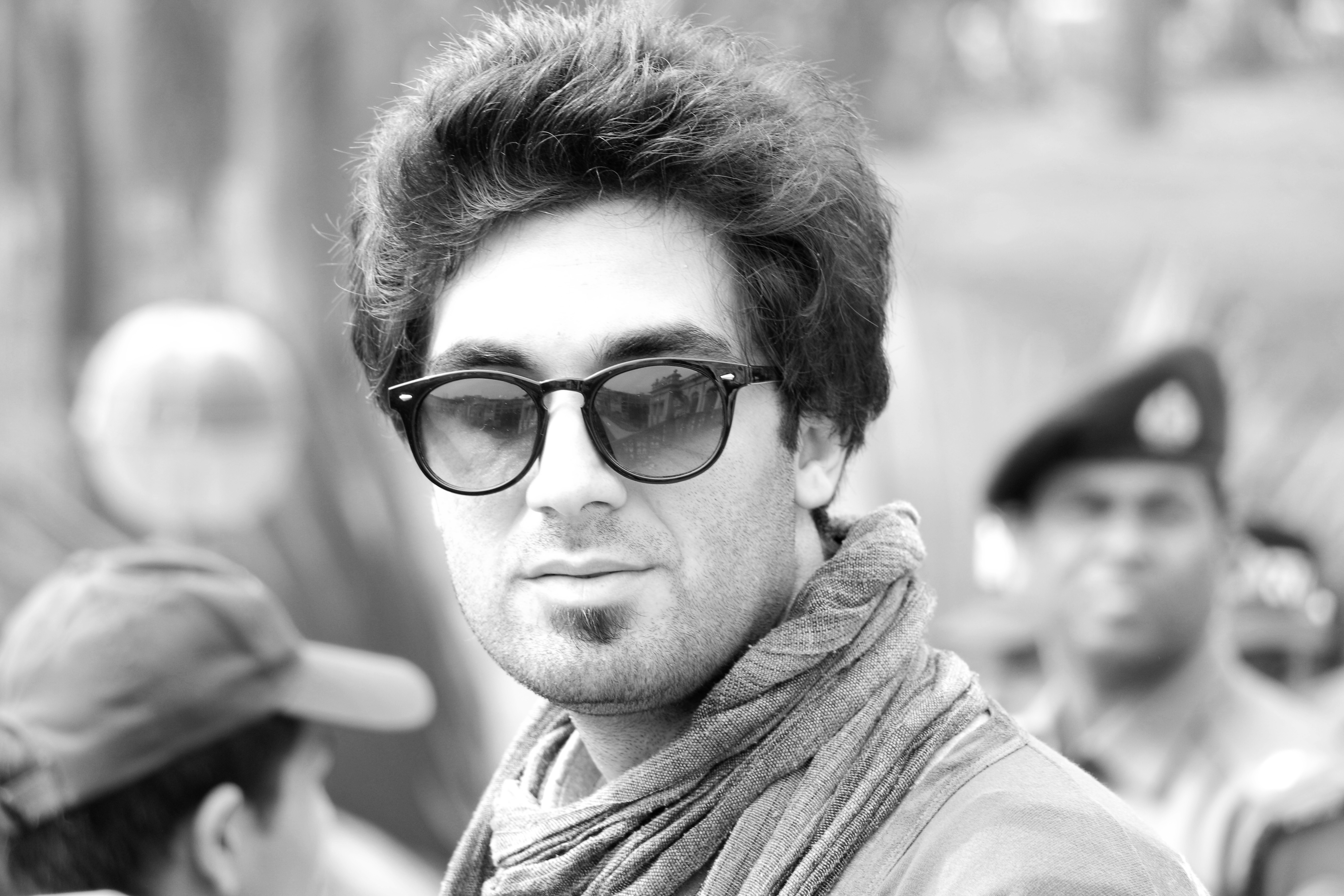
Ehsan Hemmati

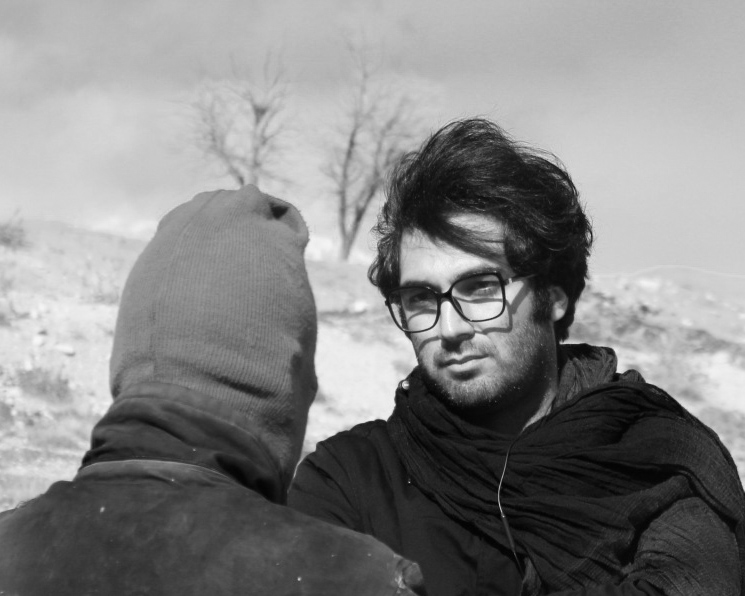
Ehsan Hemmati

Title	Director	Producer	Writer	Distribution
A Side to Exit	Yes	-	Yes	Fiction Film / Drama
One Day Later	Yes	-	-	Fiction Film / Drama
PTSD 11	Yes	Yes	-	Fiction Film / Psychodrama
Alpha	Yes	Yes	-	Experimental Film
Hill of Science	Yes	Yes	-	Documentary Film
The Identity of a Remedy	Yes	Yes	-	Documentary Film
The Fate of the Stone	Yes	Yes	Yes	Documentary Film
A House of Science Named Zand	Yes	Yes	-	Documentary Film
Taboo	-	Yes	-	Experimental Film
Tragodia	-	Yes	-	Experimental Film

== Awards and nominations ==
- A Side to Exit . Selected by the 42nd Fajr International Short Film Festival, Iran
- A Side to Exit . Selected by the 40th Tehran International Short Film Festival, Iran
- One Day Later . Awarded the best Lead Actor by the South Film and Academy Festival, Chile
- One Day Later . Awarded the best Lead Actress by the South Film and Academy Festival, Chile
- One Day Later . Awarded the best Art Direction by the South Film and Academy Festival, Chile
- One Day Later . Awarded Third Audience Award by the South Film and Academy Festival, Chile
- Alpha . Selected by the 16th Dhaka International Film Festival, Bangladesh
- One Day Later . Selected by the 15th Dhaka International Film Festival, Bangladesh
- One Day Later . Selected by the Mediterranean Film Festival Cannes, Paris
- One Day Later . Selected by the 33rd Tehran International Short Film Festival, Iran
- One Day Later . Awarded the best set design prize by the 58th local Arvand Film Festival, Abadan, Iran
- One Day Later . Nominated for best cinematography by the 58th local Arvand Film Festival, Abadan, Iran
- One Day Later . Selected by the 12th Film Festival Romania
- PTSD 11 . Selected by the 14th Dhaka International Film Festival, Bangladesh
- PTSD 11 . Selected by the 31st Tehran International Short Film Festival, Iran
- PTSD 11 . Awarded the best editing prize by the 50th local Aftab Film Festival, Arak, Iran
- PTSD 11 . Awarded the best sound mixing prize by the 50th local Aftab Film Festival, Arak, Iran
- PTSD 11 . Nominated for best cinematography by the 50th local Aftab Film Festival, Arak, Iran
- PTSD 11 . Nominated as the best movie by the 50th local Aftab Film Festival, Arak, Iran
- PTSD 11 . Awarded the best special effects prize by the 3rd Student Short Film Festival, Bushehr, Iran
- PTSD 11 . Awarded the best actor prize by the 3rd Student Short Film Festival, Bushehr, Iran
- PTSD 11 . Awarded the best set design prize by the 3rd Student Short Film Festival, Bushehr, Iran
- The Identity of a Remedy . Selected by the 3rd Student Short Film Festival, Bushehr, Iran
- Official selection in LEEDS film festival Oscar and BAFTA Qualified Film Festival for experimental film TRAGUDIA / England 2019 / As Writer & Director and sound designer
- Official selection in Mill valley film festival Oscar Qualified Film Festival for experimental film TRAGUDIA / USA 2019 / As Writer & Director and sound designer
- Official selection in the Tehran International Short Film Festival Oscar Qualified Film Festival for experimental film TABOO – Iran 2021/ Writer & Director
