= Büşra Ün =

Turkish wheelchair tennis player and archer (born 1994)

- Full name: Büşra Fatma Ün
- Country (sports): Turkey
- Born: 19 May 1994 (age 31) İzmir, Turkey
- Plays: Right handed
- Official website: www.busraun.com/busra-kimdir-

Singles
- Highest ranking: 30 (29 April 2013)
- Current ranking: 33

Doubles
- Highest ranking: 26 (13 May 2013)
- Current ranking: 35
Medal record
Women's wheelchair tennis, Wheelchair archery
Representing Turkey
World Championship
Gold medal – first place	2025 Gwangju	Doubles compound

Büşra Fatma Ün (born 19 May 1994) is a Turkish female wheelchair archer and former Paralympic wheelchair tennis player.

== Early years ==
Büşra Ün was born in İzmir. At the age of six-and-half-months, her parents noticed that she has no feeling at her feet. She was diagnosed with neuroblastoma having a malignant tumor in her right abdomen. After one-and-half-year-long chemotherapy and two surgeries, the tumor was removed. However, due to damaged nerves, she became paraplegic.

Currently, she is a student of sport management at Ege University in İzmir.

== Wheelchair tennis career ==
She began with table tennis playing, and then switched over to wheelchair tennis in February 2009 as she was studying in the high school's fourth grade in Buca. She plays right handed.

She is Turkish champion in the women's and junior's category. In 2010, she won the Balkan Championship. She is on the third place in the world's under-18 ranking. In the world's list, she climbed up to the 30th place.

Ün obtained a quota spot at the 2016 Summer Paralympics in Rio de Janeiro, Brazil. She is so the first ever Turkish wheelchair tennis player to represent her country at the Paralympics.

After the 2020 Tokyo Paralympics, she announced that she ended her wheelchair tennis career.

== Wheelchair archery career ==
After quitting wheelchair tennis playing, Ün got interested in wheelchair archery, and started her new career in 2022. In April 2025, she competed at the 2nd leg of the Turkish Para Archery Cup in Antalya, and captured the gold medal defeating Öznur Cire in the finals of the individual compound open event.

She won the gold medal with her teammate Öznur Cüre in the doubles open event at the 2025 World Para Archery Championships in Gwangju, South Korea.
