= Pooja Jatyan =

Indian para archer

Pooja Jatyan (born 1998) is a para archer from Haryana. She is the first para athlete from India to take part in an Olympic Archery event at the Rio Paralympics 2016. She took part in the recurve women's open competition and qualified for the Rio event at the final world qualifier in the Czech Republic in 2016. She qualified to represent India at the 2024 Summer Paralympics in Paris, France, her second Olympics. But she lost in the quarterfinals.

== Early life ==
Jatyan is born in Gurugram but shifted to Rohtak, Haryana after her marriage. She suffered polio in her childhood at the age of five which left impairment in her left leg. She did her post-graduate studies in Library Sciences from Baba Mastnath University. She trains at Rajiv Gandhi stadium, in Rohtak. She is the oldest of four siblings.

== Career ==
Jatyan was the first Indian archer to win an individual medal at the Para World Championships. She won a silver medal at the World Archery Para Championships at the Dubai in May 2022. She made her international debut at the 2018 Asian Para Games where she missed a bronze medal. Later, she took part in the 2019 World Championships but failed to progress beyond Round 2.

In September 2024, she took a two set lead but lost 4-6 against Chinese Wu Chunyan in the quarterfinals in the women's recurve open at the Paris Paralympics.

In 2026, she represented India at the 2026 Asian Para Games at Aichi Nagoya, Japan, and won a silver medal in the women's recurve doubles along with Bhawna Choudhary.
