= Rakesh Kumar (Paralympian) =

Indian Paralympian archer

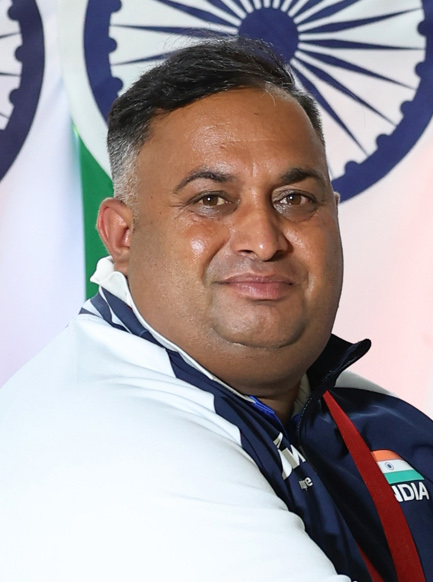
- Kumar in 2024

Personal information
- Born: 13 January 1985 (age 41) Katra, Jammu and Kashmir, India

Sport
- Sport: Para-archery
- Event: Compound
- Coached by: Kuldeep Vedwan

Achievements and titles
- Highest world ranking: 1 (2024)
- Personal best: 1399 WR PR (2024)
Medal record
Men's compound para-archery
Representing India
Paralympic Games
Bronze medal – third place	2024 Paris	Mixed team
World Championships
Gold medal – first place	2023 Plzeň	Mixed team
Silver medal – second place	2025 Gwangju	Individual
Asian Para Games
Gold medal – first place	2022 Hangzhou	Mixed team
Silver medal – second place	2022 Hangzhou	Individual
Silver medal – second place	2022 Hangzhou	Team

Rakesh Kumar (born 13 January 1985) is an Indian compound para-archer. He won a bronze medal in the mixed team compound event at the 2024 Paris Paralympics. Kumar has also won gold medals at the 2022 Asian Para Games and the 2023 World Championships in the same event.

== Career ==
He represented India at the 2020 Summer Paralympics, held in Tokyo, Japan. He won a gold medal in the men's compound open section of the 7th Fazza Para Archery World Ranking Tournament, which was held in Dubai in February 2021. Kumar is the highest-ranked compound archer in India with a world rankings of No. 1.

Rakesh was part of the team that won a gold medal in the team competition at the European Circuit 2nd leg in the year 2018 and won a bronze medal in the mixed team event at the 5th Fazza Para Archery World Ranking Tournament in the year 2019.

He was trained at the Shri Mata Vaishno Devi Shrine Board's Sports Complex and he is native of Katra, Jammu. In September 2021, the Lieutenant Governor of the Union Territory of Jammu and Kashmir, Manoj Sinha felicitated Rakesh Kumar for his performance in the 2020 Tokyo Paralympics.

He also represented India in the 2024 Paris Paralympics, in which he won the bronze medal in the mixed team compound open with Sheetal Devi.

== See also ==
- India at the 2020 Summer Paralympics
- India at the 2024 Summer Paralympics
