= Hadi Nouri =

Iranian para-archer

Hadi Nori
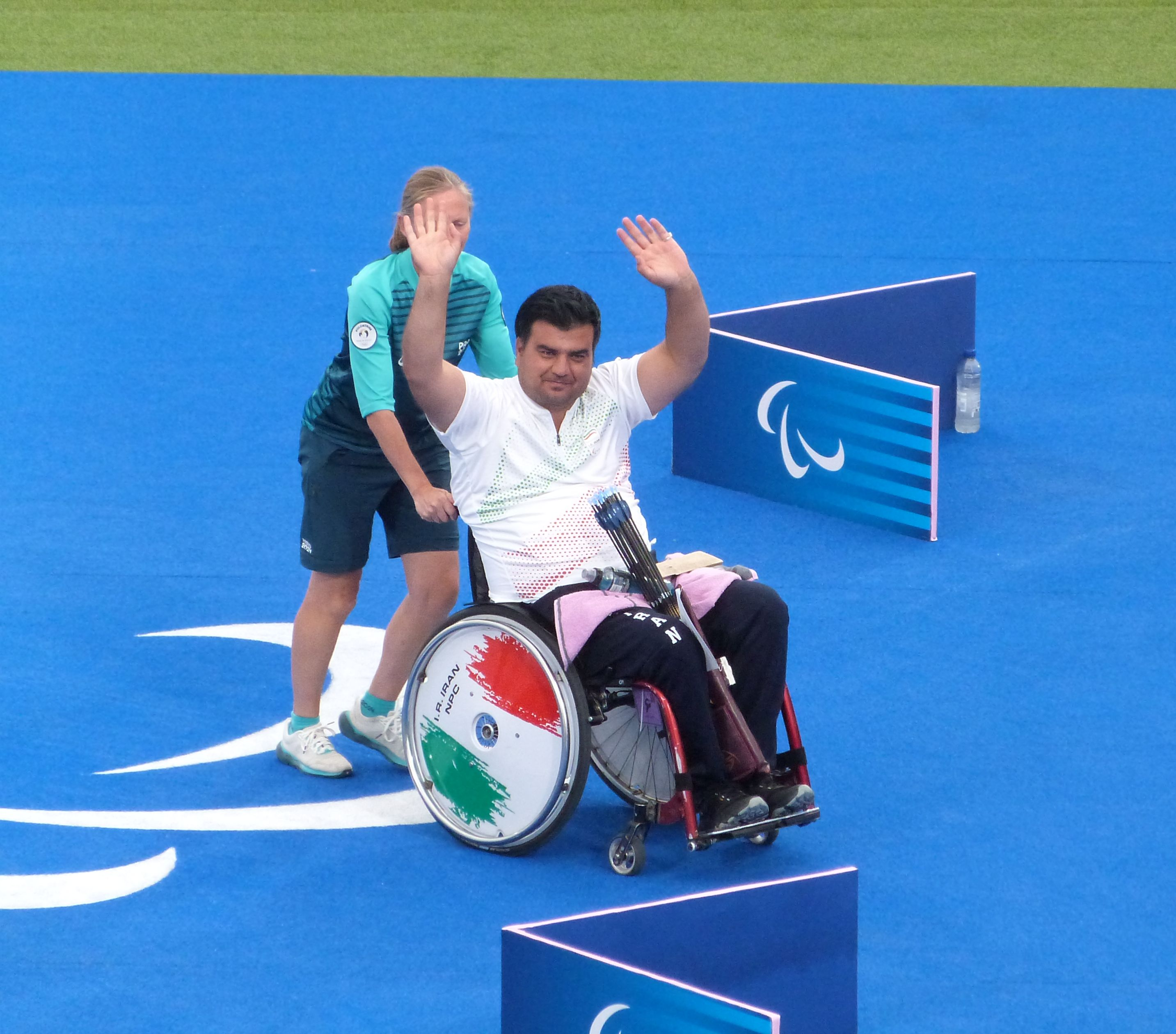

Personal information
- Nationality: Iranian
- Born: 10 April 1988 (age 38) Isfahan, Iran

Sport
- Country: Iran
- Sport: Paralympic archery
Medal record
Men's archery
Representing Iran
Summer Paralympics
| Silver medal – second place | 2024 Paris | Mixed team compound |
Asian Para Games
| Silver medal – second place | 2018 Jakarta | Mixed team compound |

Hadi Nouri or Hadi Nori (Persian: هادی نوری; born 10 April 1988) is an Iranian Paralympic archer.

== Career ==
He reached the final of the mixed team compound event at the 2024 Summer Paralympics with Fatemeh Hemmati.
