= Shyam Sundar Swami =

Indian para athlete

Shyam Sundar Swami (born 1997) is an Indian para archer from Rajasthan. He qualified for the 2024 Summer Paralympics in Paris in the men's Individual compound event of Archery competitions. He qualified for the Paris Olympics at the World Para Championships in June 2019 at Hertogenbosch with a ninth-place finish.

== Early life and education ==
Swami is from Bikaner. Before COVID-19, Anil Joshi, his coach, convinced his father, Bhagwan Das, a vegetable seller, to sell his small piece of land to buy archery equipment for his son. Though it was a difficult decision for Das, he has no regrets now as his son is selected for the Olympics. He is now employed under Rajasthan government out-of-turn job quota as a Grade 3 Physical Education Training Instructor.

== Career ==
Swami won an individual compound category gold medal at the 4th Para Senior National Archery Championship in Jind, Haryana in April 2022. He also represented India at the 2022 World Archery Para Championships.
