= Bhawna Choudhary =

Indian para archer

Bhawna Choudhary (born 2005) is an Indian para archer. She represented India at the 2026 Asian Para Games at Aichi Nagoya, Japan, and won a silver medal in the women's recurve doubles along with Pooja Jatyan.

== Career ==
Choudhary won the silver medal in the women's recurve doubles at the 2026 Asian Para Games losing the final to China’s Gao Zihan and Wang Xueqian 0-6 on 23 October 2026. They lost all three sets 31-38, 30-35 and 29-39 at the Okazaki venue.
