= Meysam Banitaba =

Iranian Paralympic judoka (born 1989)

Personal information
- Full name: Seyed Meysam Banitaba Khoram Abadi
- Nationality: Iranian
- Born: 30 March 1989 (age 37)
- Occupation: Judoka

Sport
- Country: Iran
- Sport: Para judo
- Disability class: J1
- Weight class: −60 kg
Medal record
Men's para judo
Representing Iran
Paralympic Games
Silver medal – second place	2024 Paris	−60 kg J1

Seyed Meysam Banitaba Khoram Abadi (born 30 March 1989) is an Iranian Paralympic judoka. He represented Iran at the 2024 Summer Paralympics.

== Career ==
Banitaba represented Iran at the 2024 Summer Paralympics and won a silver medal in the −60 kg J1 event.
