= Melissa Tanner =

Australian Paralympic archer (born 1973)

Melissa-Anne Tanner
Personal information
- Nationality: Australia
- Born: 14 August 1973 (age 52) Changi, Singapore

Sport
- Sport: Archery
- Disability class: Compound Open

Melissa-Anne Tanner (born 14 August 1973) is an Australian Paralympic archer. She competed at the 2024 Paris Paralympics.

== Personal ==
She was born in Singapore at an Australian Army base. She joined the Australian Airforce at the age of 18. In 2011, she broke her ankle and this resulted in part of the left leg being amputated. In 2021, her left leg was fully amputated due to Complex regional pain syndrome. She was then diagnosed with Gastroparesis and this led to her being machine fed and having a Colostomy and Pej.

Tanner was awarded a Full Blue at Griffith University while undertaking a Bachelor of Laws. She was the Director/ owner of a Lin Andrews Real Estate franchise.

== Canoeing ==
Due to her amputation she took up canoeing in 2014 represented Australia in the RIO24 World Va'a Sprint Championships, where she won six gold medals. A shoulder injury led to her giving up her dream to compete at the 2016 Rio Paralympics in para canoeing.

== Archery ==
After watching the 2020 Tokyo Paralympics, she took up para archery. She was selected to represent Australia at the 2023 World Para Archery Championships where she finished 17th in the Women's Open Compound. At the 2024 Paris Paralympics, she lost in the round of sixteen in the Women's individual compound open.
