= Vijay Sundi =

Indian para archer (born 1995)

Personal information
- Born: 1995 (age 30–31) Sikursai, West Singhbhum district, Jharkhand, India
Medal record
Men's para archery
Representing India
Asian Para Games
Gold medal – first place	2026 Aichi-Nagoya	recurve doubles

Vijay Sundi (born 1995) is an Indian para recurve archer. He represented India in the 2026 Asian Para Games and won a gold medal in the Men's recurve doubles along with Harvinder Singh. The India duo beat China's Yun Duo and Zhao Lixue 5–1 in the final.

== Early life ==
Sundi is from Sikursai village in West Singhbhum district, Jharkhand, India.

== Career ==
Sundi won gold in the recurve men's open category at the Khelo India Para Games 2025 and bronze in the recurve men's team event at the 2026 Para Archery National Championship. He won gold along with Harvinder Singh in men's para recurve doubles at the 2026 Asian Para Games.
