= Gerardo Rodríguez =

Gerardo Rodríguez may refer to:

- Gerardo Matos Rodríguez, Uruguayan musician, composer and journalist
- Carlos Gerardo Rodríguez, Mexican football midfielder
- Gerardo Rodríguez (water polo), played Water polo at the 1980 Summer Olympics
- Gerardo Enrique Rodríguez, Cuban American musician.
