= Abdelkader Bouamer =

Algerian Paralympic judoka (born 1983)

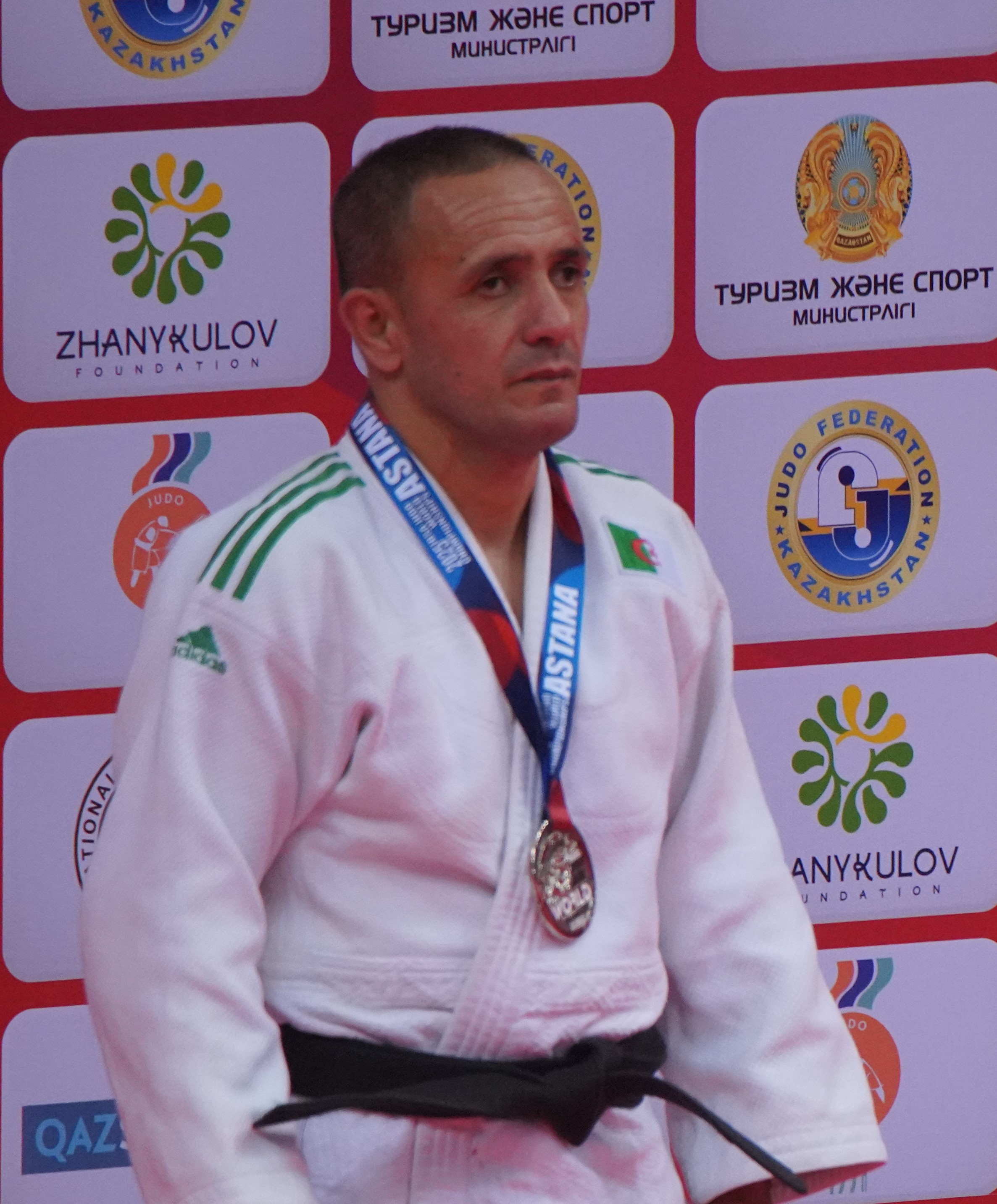

Personal information
- Born: 25 July 1983 (age 43) Boudouaou, Algeria
- Occupation: Judoka

Sport
- Country: Algeria
- Sport: Para judo
- Disability class: J1
- Weight class: −60 kg
Medal record
Men's para judo
Representing Algeria
Paralympic Games
Gold medal – first place	2024 Paris	−60 kg J1

Profile at external databases
- JudoInside.com: 170320

Abdelkader Bouamer (born 25 July 1983) is an Algerian Paralympic judoka. He represented Algeria at the 2024 Summer Paralympics.

== Career ==
Bouamer represented Algeria at the 2024 Summer Paralympics and won a gold medal in the −60 kg J1 event.
