= Ameera Lee =

Australian Paralympic archer (born 1974)

Personal information
- Nationality: Australia
- Born: 1 February 1974 (age 52)

Sport
- Sport: Archery
- Disability class: Compound Open
- Club: Sydney Olympic Park Archers

Ameera Lee (born 1 February 1974) is an Australian Paralympic archer. She competed at the 2024 Paris Paralympics.

== Personal ==
Lee was born on 1 February 1974. She has multiple sclerosis. She is a single mother with a son – Huthaifa. She is a medical secretary.

== Archery ==
She took up para archery in 2016 after being encouraged by her fifteen-year-old son. She started as a standing archer but moved to a wheelchair. Her first international competition was the 2018 Para-archery European Circuit in Olbia, Italy where she was knocked out in the quarter finals. She missed out on being selected for the 2020 Tokyo Paralympics. At the 2024 Australia Para National Archery Championships, she won the gold medal in Compound Women's Open event. She has been and remains the current National Women's Paraarchery Champion since 2017.

At the 2024 Paris Paralympics, she lost in the 1/8 round in the Women's individual compound open. She partnered with Jonathon Milne, in the Mixed team compound, where they lost in the quarter-final.

She is a New South Wales Institute of Sport scholarship athlete since 2017.

She is the first Paraarcher to win the Archery Australia Australian Open.

She is an advocate for promoting wellbeing and health for all regardless of age or ability.
