= Patrick French (archer) =

Australian Paralympic archer (born 1993)

Personal information
- Nationality: Australia
- Born: 20 May 1993 (age 33)

Sport
- Sport: Para archery
- Disability class: Compound Open
- Club: Diamond Valley Archers

Patrick French (born 20 May 1993) is an Australian Paralympic archer. He was selected to compete at the 2024 Paris Paralympics.

== Personal ==
French was born on 20 May 1993.

In 2015, he was cutting down a tree on a farm near Daylesford, Victoria, which fell in the wrong direction. The accident left him paralysed from the waist down, and with a brain injury.

== Archery ==
After taking up hunting with a compound bow in 2022, French fell in love with archery. In 2023, he won the Australian Indoor National Championships and set a new Australian record. At the 2024 Paris Paralympics, he lost in the Round of 32 in the Men's individual compound open after qualifying in twenty first.

In 2024, he was a Victorian Institute of Sport scholarship athlete.
