= Jonathon Milne =

Australian Paralympic archer

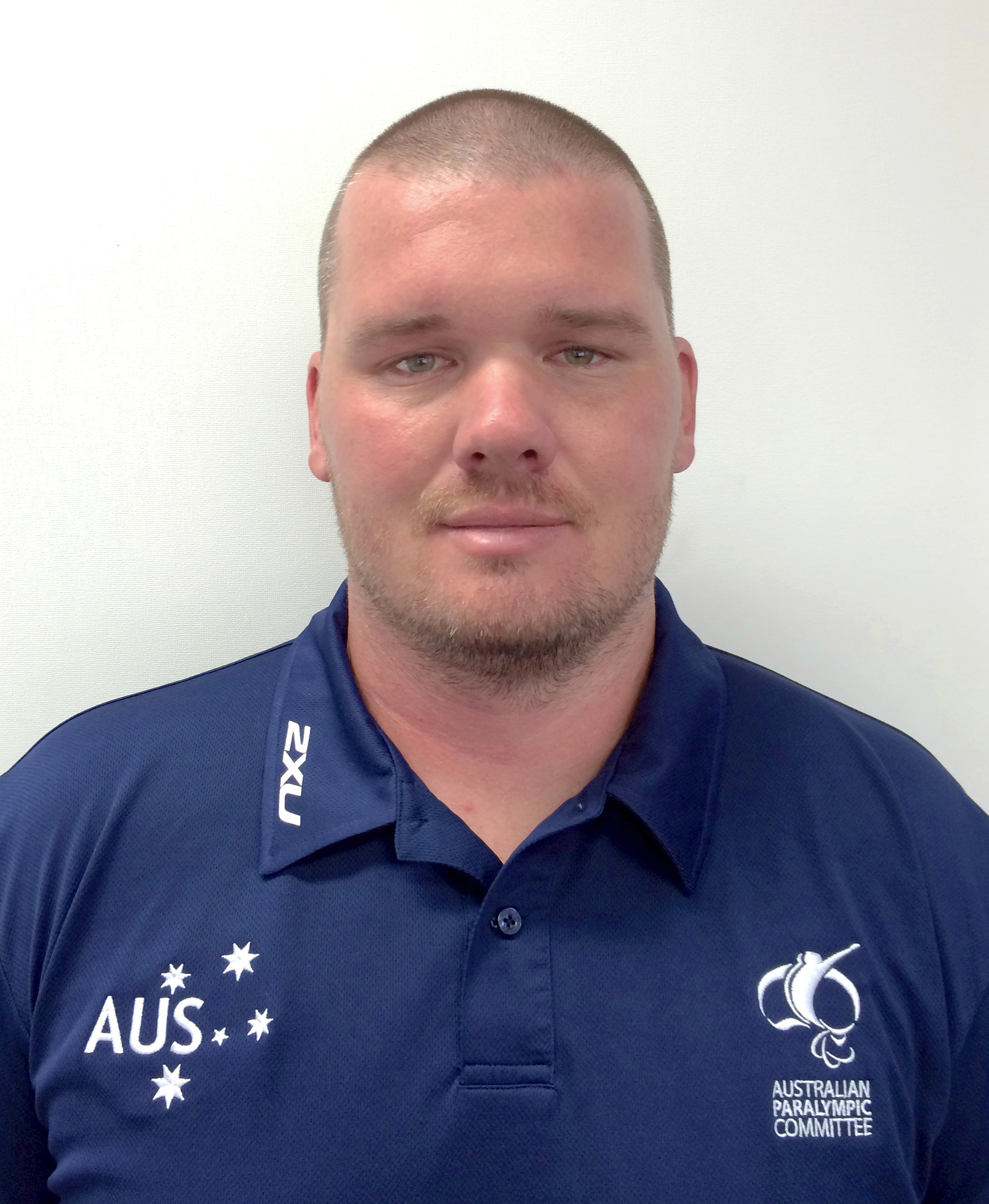

Personal information
- Nationality: Australia
- Born: 25 January 1986 (age 40) Sydney, Australia

Sport
- Sport: Archery
- Disability class: ARW2
- Club: Sydney Paralympic Archers
- Coached by: Ricci Cheah
Medal record
Men's Archery
Representing Australia
Paralympic Games
Bronze medal – third place	2016 Rio	Individual compound
World Para Archery Championship
Silver medal – second place	2022 Dubai	Team compound
Bronze medal – third place	2023 Plzeň	Individual compound

Jonathon Milne is an Australian Paralympic archer. In April 2015 he won the National Para Championships, held in Melbourne. He represented Australia at the 2016 Rio Paralympics where he won a bronze medal. Milne won a bronze medal at the 2023 World Para Archery Championships. He competed at 2024 Paris Paralympics - his third Paralympics.

== Personal ==
Jonathon Milne was born on 25 January 1986. On 23 December 2012, while swimming with his wife Sarah at Avoca Beach on the New South Wales Central Coast, Milne broke his neck diving into the ocean, leaving him paralysed from the chest down. Sarah dragged him to shore. He was taken to Royal North Shore Hospital in Sydney. He spent the next five and a half months there and the Royal Rehabilitation Hospital in Ryde. He completed a Certificate III in carpentry at TAFE in 2012, but now works full-time at the Abbey Archery store in Castle Hill, New South Wales.

== Archery ==
Milne took up archery, a sport which he had tried as a teenager, as it allowed him to keep his mind off his injuries and could be easily performed in a chair. After his accident he tried wheel-chair tennis but did not enjoy it. He would travel from Ryde to the archery range at Sydney Olympic Park.

Milne competes in the Compound Bow division. Within the division he is classified as an ARW2 athlete, for archers who are impaired in the legs.

In 2015, Milne competed at the National Championships held in Morwell, Victoria, placing eighth in target and twelfth in short-distance events against able-bodied athletes, and won the National Para championship. He was selected to compete for Australia at the 2015 Para World Championships in Donaueschingen in Germany, where if he placed within the top 19 he would qualify for the 2016 Rio Paralympics. He placed an impressive fourth, losing the bronze medal final to Great Britain's John Stubbs. As of July 2016, he is ranked number 40 in the world in the men's open compound classification, and is coached by Ricci Cheah. On 29 July 2016, the Australian Paralympic Committee announced his selection for Rio.

He was the first Australian to qualify in Paralympic archery since the 2004 Summer Paralympics in Athens, and Australia had not previously won a medal in the sport at the Paralympic Games since the 1984 Summer Paralympics.

At the 2016 Rio Paralympics, he won the bronze medal in the Men's Individual Compound - Open. He became Australia's first archery medallist since 1984 when Ian Trewhella won two silver medals. He was seeded ninth in the competition and defeated the top seed Bulent Korkmaz in the quarter-final in a match that went down to the final arrow.

At the 2020 Tokyo Paralympics, he lost in the Round of 16 to Andre Shelby of the USA in the Men's individual compound open after qualifying eighth.

Milne teamed with Garry Robinson to win the silver medal in the Men's Team Compound at the 2022 World Para Archery Championships. He won the bronze medal in the Men's Individual Compound Open at the 2023 World Para Archery Championships.

At the 2024 Paris Paralympics, he lost in the Round of 16 in the Men's individual compound open after qualifying tenth. He partnered with Ameera Lee, in the Mixed team compound where they lost in the quarter-final.

In 2024, he is a New South Wales Institute of Sport scholarship athlete.
