= Kenan Babaoğlu =

Turkish para-archer (born 1982)

Personal information
- Nationality: Turkish
- Born: 1982 (age 43–44) Kayseri, Turkey

Sport
- Country: Turkey
- Sport: Paralympic archery
- Event: Compound bow
- Club: Kayseri Spor AŞ Sports Club
Medal record
Men's archery compound bow
Representing Turkey
World Championship
Silver medal – second place	2025 Gwangju	Mixed team

Kenan Babaoğlu (born 1982) is a Turkish para-archer.

Babaoğlu is a member of Kayseri Spor AŞ Sports Club. In December 2023, he won the first place in the compound open event at the 2024 Turkish National Team Selection Tournament, and was so admitted to the national team.

He won the silver medal in the mixed team compound open event with his teammate Öznur Cüre at the 2025 World Para Archery Championships in Gwangju, South Korea.
