= Para archery classification =

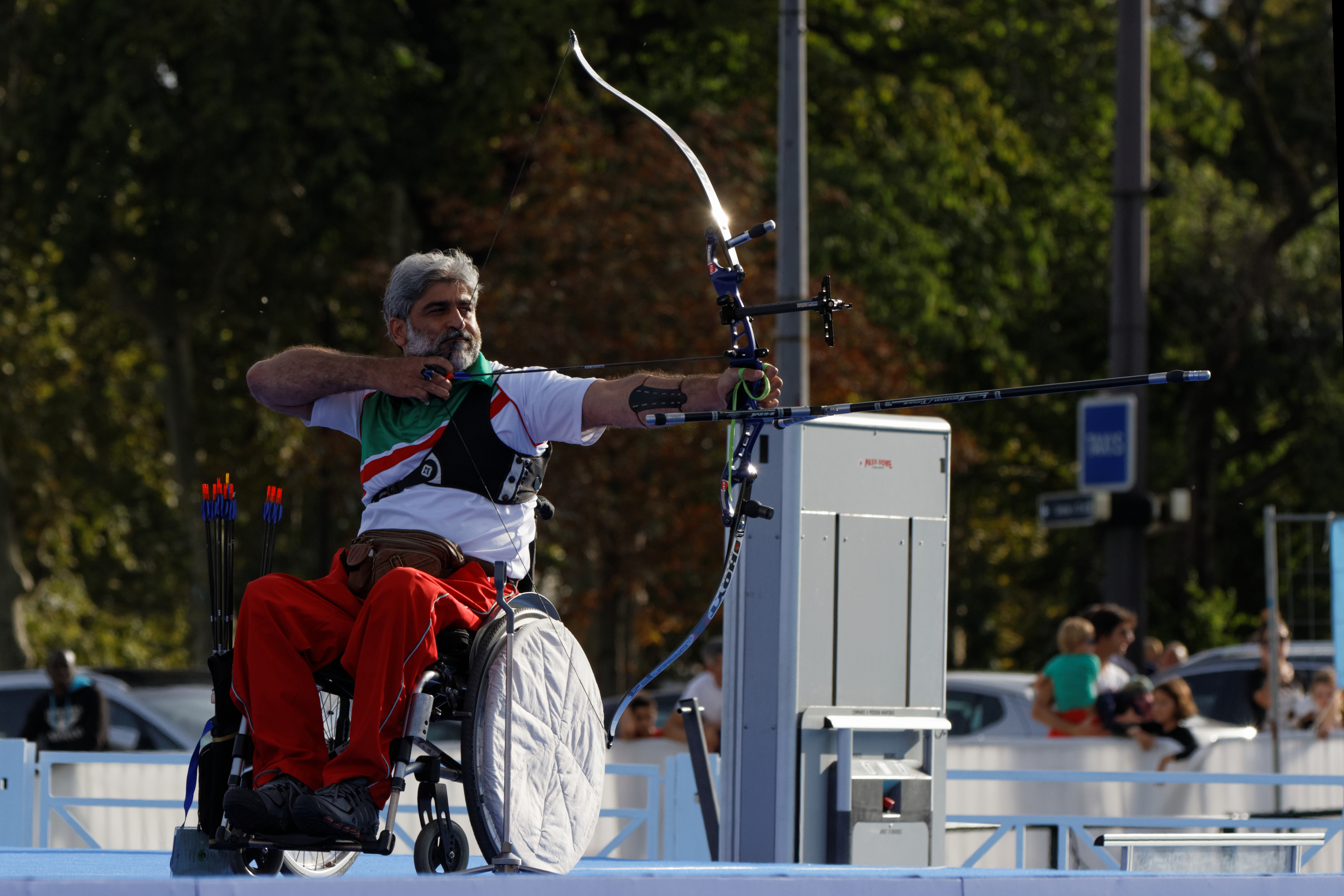
Ebrahim Ranjbar Kivaj (ARW2) in September 2013.

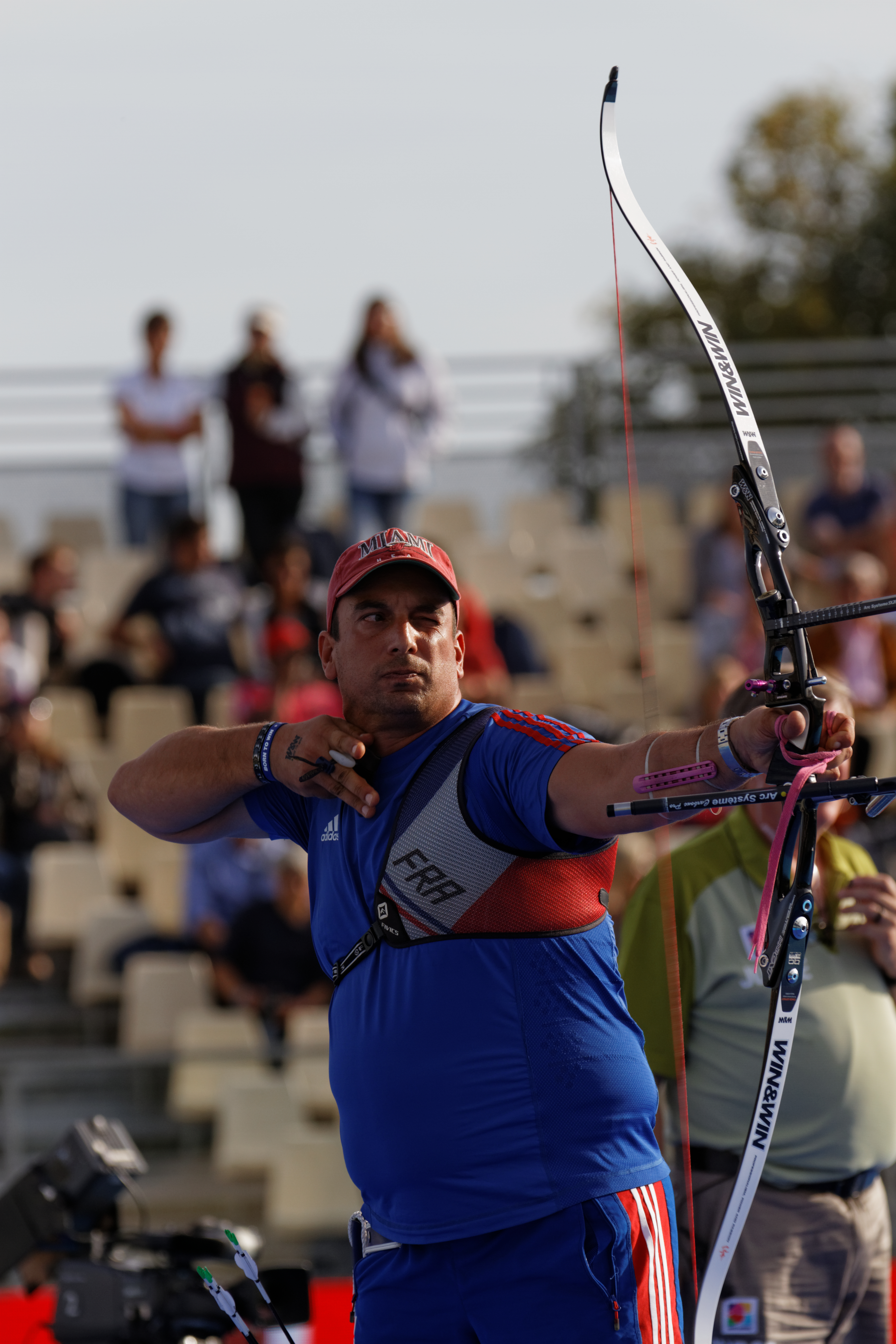
Armando Cabreira (ARST) in September 2013.

Para archery classification is the classification system for Para archery used to create a level playing field for archers with a different range of disabilities. Governance in the sport is through the International Archery Federation. Early classification systems for the sport were created during the 1940s and based on medical classification. This has subsequently changed to a functional mobility classification with the exception of blind archery.

== Definition and participation ==
Para archery classification at the Paralympic Games is the basis for determining who can compete in the sport, and within which class. It is used for the purposes of establishing fair competition. Entry is eligible to male and female athletes with a physical disability. The blind classifications are based on medical classification, no functional classification.

People with cerebral palsy are eligible to compete in archery. The Cerebral Palsy-International Sports and Recreation Association (CP-ISRA) classes of CP3, CP4, CP5, CP6, CP7 and CP8 have counterparts with the classification system used by the World Archery Federation.

== Governance ==
Governance in the sport is through the International Archery Federation (also known as the World Archery Federation or Fédération International de Tir à l’Arc – FITA) and is overseen by the International Paralympic Committee (IPC). The IPC transferred its governance to FITA in 2009 as part of the IPC's program to move governance to sport-specific bodies. FITA sets the rules for competition in the World Archery Book: the most recent version effective as of 1 April 2012. In 1983, the rules for this sport and approval for classification was done by the Federation Internationale de Tir Al'Arc.

== History ==
The classification for this sport was created during the 1940s and for much of its early history was a medical condition based classification system. In 1964, the International Sport Organization for the Disabled (ISOD) was created. They created the first formal classification system, which had 27. This was reduced to 12 classifications for the 1976 Summer Paralympics and was further reduced to nine classifications for the 1992 Summer Paralympics. In 1983, classification for cerebral palsy competitors in this sport was undertaken by the Cerebral Palsy-International Sports and Recreation Association (CP-ISRA). The classification was based upon the system designed for field athletics events. There were five cerebral palsy classifications for its competitors. Class 1 and Class 2 competitors could compete in the division 1, class 1 and class 2 events. They defined cerebral palsy as a non-progressive brain lesion that results in impairment. People with cerebral palsy or non-progressive brain damage were eligible for classification by them. The organisation also dealt with classification for people with similar impairments. For their classification system, people with spina bifida were not eligible unless they had medical evidence of loco-motor dysfunction. People with cerebral palsy and epilepsy were eligible provided the condition did not interfere with their ability to compete. People who had strokes were eligible for classification following medical clearance. Competitors with multiple sclerosis, muscular dystrophy and arthrogryposis were not eligible for classification by CP-ISRA, but were eligible for classification by International Sports Organisation for the Disabled for the Games of Les Autres. By the early 1990s, the archery classification had moved away from medical based ones to a functional classification system. Going into the 2000 Summer Paralympics, there were concerns raised by members of the cerebral palsy community about the need to maintain a multiple functional classification system inside this sport specifically for this class of athletes given the large range of functional ability inside the community with cerebral palsy and other motor functional disabilities. Because of issues in objectively identifying functionality that plagued the post Barcelona Games, the IPC unveiled plans to develop a new classification system in 2003. This classification system went into effect in 2007, and defined ten different disability types that were eligible to participate on the Paralympic level. It required that classification be sport specific, and served two roles. The first was that it determined eligibility to participate in the sport and that it created specific groups of sportspeople who were eligible to participate and in which class. The IPC left it up to International Federations to develop their own classification systems within this framework, with the specification that their classification systems use an evidence based approach developed through research.

== Eligibility ==
As of 2012, people with physical disabilities are eligible to compete in this sport. Male and female athletes with a physical disability (as defined by the IPC) can compete in the following divisions: recurve (or classic) bow, compound bow and visually impaired (VI). Within these divisions are open, standing and wheelchair classes with events for individuals and teams. The distance from the target and number of arrows shot is the same for para-archery athletes as for able-bodied competitors except for the Visually Impaired (VI) division. Athletes must have a current disability classification card or their results will not qualify for World Records, titles or any other rankings.

== Classes ==
There are three divisions in Para archery: Recurve bow, Compound bow and Visually impaired. Within these divisions, athletes are classified by their impairment(s) as follows:

- ARW1 (also known as W1). Archery Wheelchair 1. Impairment in the arms and legs. Athletes compete from a wheelchair and have “limited function in lower and upper limbs, and usually trunk eg those with high level spinal cord injuries, or high multiple limb amputations”.
- ARW2 (also known as W2). Archery Wheelchair 2. Impairment in the legs. Athletes compete from a wheelchair and have “significantly limited lower limb function with little or no upper limb impairment eg athletes with paraplegia, diplegia or double leg amputation below the knee.”
- ARST (also known as ST). Archery Standing. Athletes may compete standing or in a wheelchair, but have limited impairment.

Assistive devices must be authorized by an international classifier and listed on the athlete's classification card. Assistive devices can include:

- Wheelchair
- Chair/Stool
- Block
- Permitted body support
- Prosthesis
- Release aid
- Bow bandage
- Bow arm splint
- String arm wrist splint
- Assistant

Visually impaired athletes in the VI division must wear a blindfold for vision impairment equality.

== Process ==
For a Para archery athlete to compete at the Paralympic Games, international classification by an International Classification Panel is required. The International Classification Panel will allocate a class to the athlete and rule which (if any) assistive equipment the athlete may use. Their ruling overrides all prior classifications including those of a national basis. Athletes must be classified according to their disability and level of impairment. The classification process normally involves a physical assessment to authenticate the disability and evaluate the degree of limitation. The athlete will be observed in competition action. Results will place the athlete in one of the three classes (see Classes): this evaluation cannot be used for sports outside of Archery.

Whilst athletes may be deemed to have a disability or impairment, this does not guarantee classification. Athletes may be deemed ineligible to compete based on any of the following findings:

- their disability does not affect the physical movements required in archery
- their primary impairment is not a physical disability.

Athletes may need to undergo the classification process more than once if their impairment is of a progressive nature. For Australian competitors in this sport, the sport is not supported by the Australian Paralympic Committee. There are three types of classification available for Australian competitors: Provisional, national and international. The first is for club level competitions, the second for state and national competitions, and the third for international competitions.

== At the Paralympic Games ==
Only wheelchair classified athletes were eligible to compete at the 1960 Summer Paralympics in Rome in this sport. This continued at the 1964 Summer Paralympics in Tokyo and 1968 Summer Paralympics in Tel Aviv. Competitors with cerebral palsy classifications were allowed to compete at the Paralympics for the first time at the 1984 Summer Paralympics. At the 1992 Summer Paralympics, amputee and wheelchair disability types were eligible to participate, with classification being run through the IPC, with classification including standing, sitting and open. At the 2000 Summer Paralympics, 10 assessments were conducted at the Games. This resulted in 0 class changes. 88 male and 52 female Para archery athletes from across the world will compete at the 2012 Summer Paralympic Games. Competition is being held at The Royal Artillery Barracks from the 30 August to 5 September, with nine medal events in standing and seated classes held. A maximum of three athletes per country will compete in individual events. For each team event, a maximum of one team with three athletes per country is allowed.

For the 2016 Summer Paralympics in Rio, the International Paralympic Committee had a zero classification at the Games policy. This policy was put into place in 2014, with the goal of avoiding last minute changes in classes that would negatively impact athlete training preparations. All competitors needed to be internationally classified with their classification status confirmed prior to the Games, with exceptions to this policy being dealt with on a case by case basis. In case there was a need for classification or reclassification at the Games despite best efforts otherwise, archery classification was scheduled for 7 September and 8 September at Sambodromo. For sportspeople with physical or intellectual disabilities going through classification or reclassification in Rio, their in competition observation event is their first appearance in competition at the Games.

== Prominent athletes ==
Some prominent Para archery athletes have competed and won medals in both able-bodied and paralympic competition. The first paraplegic athlete to compete in able-bodied competition the Olympic Games was a Para archer named Neroli Fairhall of New Zealand.

== Future ==
Going forward, disability sport's major classification body, the International Paralympic Committee, is working on improving classification to be more of an evidence-based system as opposed to a performance-based system so as not to punish elite athletes whose performance makes them appear in a higher class alongside competitors who train less.
