= Fatemeh Hemmati =

Iranian para-archer (born 2003)

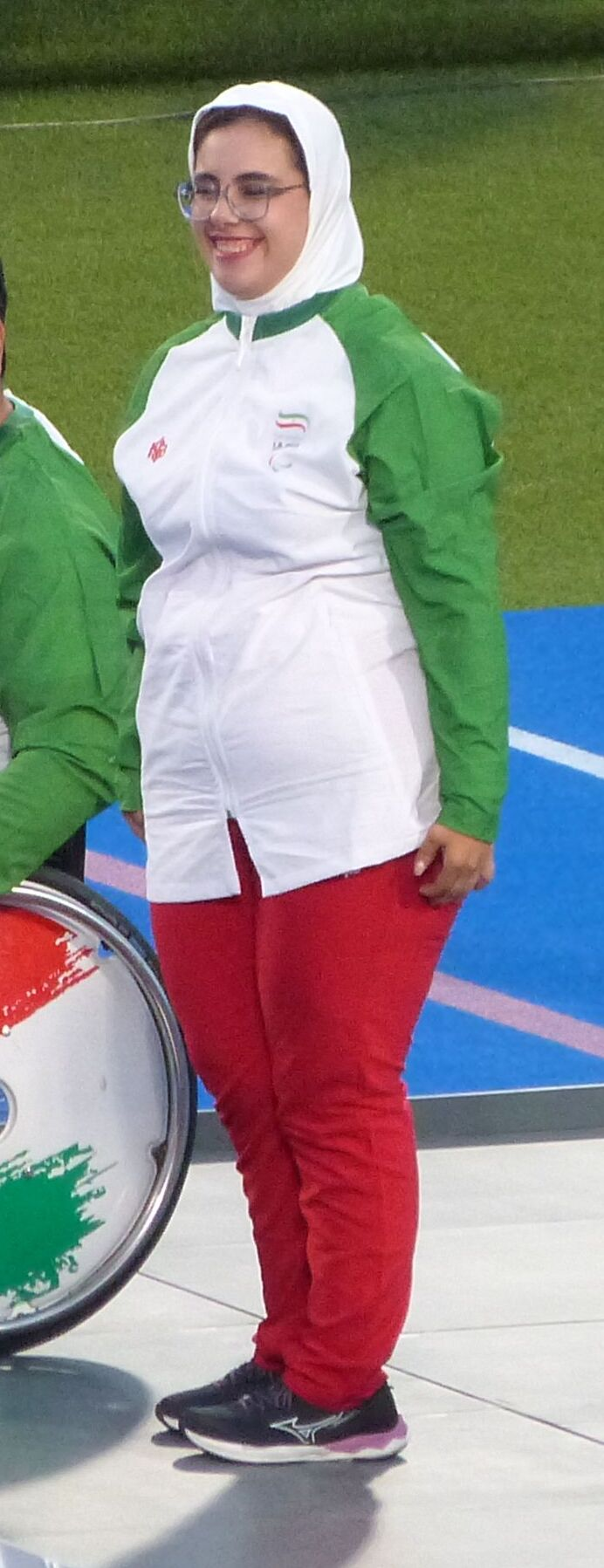
- Fatemeh Hemmati at para archery 2024 Summer Paralympic Games

Personal information
- Nationality: Iranian
- Born: 19 May 2003 (age 23)

Sport
- Country: Iran
- Sport: Paralympic archery
Medal record
Women's archery
Representing Iran
Summer Paralympics
Silver medal – second place	2024 Paris	Individual compound
Silver medal – second place	2024 Paris	Mixed team compound

Fatemeh Hemmati (Persian: فاطمه همتی; born 19 May 2003) is an Iranian Paralympian archer.

== Career ==
She won the silver medal in the women's compound event at the 2024 Summer Paralympics after knocking out the local favourite, Julie Rigault-Chupin in the competition. She was beaten by the Turkish archer Öznur Cüre.
