= Archery at the 2016 Summer Paralympics – Team compound open =

Mixed team compound open at the XV Paralympic Games
- Paralympic Archery
- Venue: Rio de Janeiro
- Competitors: 20 from 10 nations

Medalists
1st place, gold medalist(s)		Ai Xinliang; Zhou Jiamin	China
2nd place, silver medalist(s)		Jodie Grinham; John Stubbs	Great Britain
3rd place, bronze medalist(s)		Lee Ouk-soo; Kim Mi-soon	South Korea

The mixed team compound open event was one of three team events held in archery at the 2016 Summer Paralympics in Rio de Janeiro. It contained ten teams of one man and one woman, and took place on Monday 12 September 2016, the ranking round having been held on September 10. Following the restructure of the Paralympic archery events, this was the first time the event would take place.

Following a ranking round, the teams ranked 7th to 10th entered the knockout rounds at the first round stages, with the six highest seeded teams entering in the quarter final round. The losing semifinalists played off for the bronze medal.

== Team compound open ==
=== Ranking round ===
Rank	Nation	Archers	Score
1	Iran (IRI)	Hadi Nori; Somayeh Abbaspour	1342
2	China (CHN)	Ai Xinliang; Zhou Jiamin	1342
3	Turkey (TUR)	Bülent Korkmaz; Handan Biroğlu	1335
4	Italy (ITA)	Alberto Simonelli; Eleonora Sarti	1327
5	Great Britain (GBR)	John Stubbs; Jodie Grinham	1324
6	Brazil (BRA)	Andrey Muniz de Castro; Jane Karla Gogel	1316
7	Canada (CAN)	Kevin Evans; Karen van Nest	1310
8	South Korea (KOR)	Lee Ouk-soo; Kim Mi-soon	1309
9	United States (USA)	Kj Polish; Samantha Tucker	1282
10	Spain (ESP)	Guillermo Javier Rodriguez Gonzalez; Maria Carmen Rubio Larrion	1259

=== Competition bracket ===
First Round
8	South Korea	147
9	United States	146
7	Canada	144
10	Spain	137

Quarter Final
1	Iran	148
8	South Korea	153
5	Great Britain	150
4	Italy	149
3	Turkey	147
6	Brazil	145
7	Canada	143
2	China	155

Semi Final
8	South Korea	143
5	Great Britain	144
3	Turkey	139
2	China	149

Final
2	(gold) China	151
5	(silver) Great Britain	143
Third place
8	(bronze) South Korea	138
3	Turkey	128
