= Archery at the 2012 Summer Paralympics – Men's individual compound =

The Men's individual compound open is one of the events held in archery at the 2012 Summer Paralympics in London.

== W1 ==
Men's individual compound W1 at the XIV Paralympic Games
- Paralympic Archery
- Venue: The Royal Artillery Barracks
- Competitors: 12 from 8 nations

Medalists
1st place, gold medalist(s)		Jeff Fabry	United States
2nd place, silver medalist(s)		David Drahonínský	Czech Republic
3rd place, bronze medalist(s)		Norbert Murphy	Canada

=== Ranking round ===
Rank	Target/Back No.	Archer	Score
1	18A	David Drahonínský (CZE)	662
2	19A	Jeff Fabry (USA)	659
3	19C	Peter Kinik (SVK)	635
4	17B	Jean-Pierre Antonios (FIN)	632
5	18B	Osmo Kinnunen (FIN)	627
6	20C	Norbert Murphy (CAN)	623
7	19B	John Cavanagh (GBR)	616
8	18C	Fabio Azzolini (ITA)	612
9	17C	Gabriele Ferrandi (ITA)	590
10	20A	Jerry Shields (USA)	586
11	20B	Shinichi Saito (JPN)	563
12	17A	Petr Bartoš (CZE)	546

=== Competition bracket ===
==== Finals ====
Semi-finals
1	David Drahonínský (CZE)	6
5	Osmo Kinnunen (FIN)	0
6	Norbert Murphy (CAN)	3
2	Jeff Fabry (USA)	7

Finals
1	David Drahonínský (CZE)	2
2	Jeff Fabry (USA)	6
Third place
5	Osmo Kinnunen (FIN)	1
6	Norbert Murphy (CAN)	7

==== Section 1 ====
Round of 16			Quarter-finals			Semi-finals
			1	David Drahonínský (CZE)	6
8	Fabio Azzolini (ITA)	6	8	Fabio Azzolini (ITA)	5
9	Gabriele Ferrandi (ITA)	5				1	David Drahonínský (CZE)	6
5	Osmo Kinnunen (FIN)	6				5	Osmo Kinnunen (FIN)	0
12	Petr Bartoš (CZE)	0	5	Osmo Kinnunen (FIN)	6
			4	Jean-Pierre Antonios (FIN)	4

==== Section 2 ====
Round of 16			Quarter-finals			Semi-finals
			3	Jean-Pierre Antonios (FIN)	2
11	Shinichi Saito (JPN)	2	6	Norbert Murphy (CAN)	6
6	Norbert Murphy (CAN)	6				6	Norbert Murphy (CAN)	3
7	John Cavanagh (GBR)	7				2	Jeff Fabry (USA)	7
10	Jerry Shields (USA)	1	7	John Cavanagh (GBR)	1
			2	Jeff Fabry (USA)	7

== Open ==
Men's individual compound Open at the XIV Paralympic Games
- Paralympic Archery
- Venue: The Royal Artillery Barracks
- Competitors: 28 from 17 nations

Medalists
1st place, gold medalist(s)		Jere Forsberg	Finland
2nd place, silver medalist(s)		Matt Stutzman	United States
3rd place, bronze medalist(s)		Doğan Hancı	Turkey

=== Ranking round ===
Rank	Target/Back No.	Archer	Score	10's
1	18C	Matt Stutzman (USA)	685	40
2	19B	Jere Forsberg (FIN)	673	36
3	16A	Doğan Hancı (TUR)	671	32
4	21C	John Stubbs (GBR)	669	33
5	15C	Alberto Simonelli (ITA)	659	26
6	18A	Peter Kascak (SVK)	658	27
7	17B	Leos Bartos (CZE)	657	26
8	19C	Philippe Horner (SUI)	656	31
9	17C	Dugie Denton (USA)	656	25
10	24B	Marek Kantczak (POL)	653	26
11	20B	Maurice Champey (FRA)	653	25
12	18B	Keijo Kallunki (FIN)	650	31
13	23B	Guillermo Rodriguez Gonzalez (ESP)	649	21
14	23A	Ouk Soo Lee (KOR)	647	23
15	22C	John Olav Johansen (NOR)	642	23
16	20C	Richard Hennahane (GBR)	640	17
17	15B	Jiri Klich (CZE)	637	20
18	17A	Erdogan Aygan (TUR)	637	17
19	22A	Robert Larsson (SWE)	636	20
20	24A	Alexey Shcherbakov (RUS)	631	16
21	16C	Gaimpaolo Cancelli (ITA)	630	19
22	21B	Franck Huadoin (FRA)	630	15
23	21A	Bob Hudson (CAN)	629	14
24	19A	Marian Marecak (SVK)	629	13
25	20A	Kevin Evans (CAN)	626	15
26	22B	Pavlo Nazar (UKR)	623	14
27	16B	Jaroslav Zelenka (CZE)	619	19
28	15A	Abdullah Sener (TUR)	588	13

=== Competition bracket ===
==== Finals ====
Quarter-finals
1	Matt Stutzman (USA)	6
9	Dugie Denton (USA)	4
5	Alberto Simonelli (ITA)	4
13	Guillermo Rodriguez (ESP)	6
3	Doğan Hancı (TUR)	7
6	Peter Kascak (SVK)	3
7	Leos Bartos (CZE)	0
2	Jere Forsberg (FIN)	6

Semi-finals
1	Matt Stutzman (USA)	6
13	Guillermo Rodriguez (ESP)	4
3	Doğan Hancı (TUR)	3
2	Jere Forsberg (FIN)	7

Finals
1	Matt Stutzman (USA)	4
2	Jere Forsberg (FIN)	6
Third place
13	Guillermo Rodriguez (ESP)	2
3	Doğan Hancı (TUR)	6

==== Section 1 ====
Round of 32
17	Jiri Klich (CZE)	6
16	Richard Hennahane (GBR)	4
9	Dugie Denton (USA)	6
24	Marian Marecak (SVK)	2
25	Kevin Evans (CAN)	6
8	Philippe Horner (SUI)	4

Round of 16
1	Matt Stutzman (USA)	6
17	Jiri Klich (CZE)	5
9	Dugie Denton (USA)	6
25	Kevin Evans (CAN)	4

Quarter-finals
1	Matt Stutzman (USA)	6
9	Dugie Denton (USA)	4

==== Section 2 ====
Round of 32
5	Alberto Simonelli (ITA)	6
28	Abdullah Sener (TUR)	4
21	Giampaolo Cancelli (ITA)	6
12	Keijo Kallunki (FIN)	0
13	Guillermo Rodriguez (ESP)	6
20	Alexey Shcherbakov (RUS)	4

Round of 16
5	Alberto Simonelli (ITA)	6
21	Giampaolo Cancelli (ITA)	2
13	Guillermo Rodriguez (ESP)	6
4	John Stubbs (GBR)	4

Quarter-finals
5	Alberto Simonelli (ITA)	4
13	Guillermo Rodriguez (ESP)	6

==== Section 3 ====
Round of 32
19	Robert Larsson (SWE)	7
14	Ouk Soo Lee (KOR)	3
11	Maurice Champey (FRA)	1
22	Franck Haudoin (FRA)	7
27	Jaroslav Zelenka (CZE)	0
6	Peter Kascak (SVK)	6

Round of 16
3	Doğan Hancı (TUR)	7
19	Robert Larsson (SWE)	1
22	Franck Houdoin (FRA)	2
6	Peter Kascak (SVK)	6

Quarter-finals
3	Doğan Hancı (TUR)	7
6	Peter Kascak (SVK)	3

==== Section 4 ====
Round of 32
7	Leos Bartos (CZE)	7
26	Pavlo Nazar (UKR)	1
23	Bob Hudson (CAN)	0
10	Marek Kantczak (POL)	6
15	John Olav Johansen (NOR)	0
18	Erdogan Aygan (TUR)	6

Round of 16
7	Leos Bartos (CZE)	6
10	Marek Kantczak (POL)	0
18	Erdogan Aygan (TUR)	4
2	Jere Forsberg (FIN)	6

Quarter-finals
7	Leos Bartos (CZE)	0
2	Jere Forsberg (FIN)	6
