= Archery at the 2016 Summer Paralympics – Men's individual compound open =

Archery, Men's compound open at the XV Paralympic Games
- Dates: September 10–14, 2016
- Competitors: 31

Medalists
1st place, gold medalist(s)		Andre Shelby	United States
2nd place, silver medalist(s)		Alberto Simonelli	Italy
3rd place, bronze medalist(s)		Jonathon Milne	Australia

The Men's individual compound open archery discipline at the 2016 Summer Paralympics was contested from September 10 to September 13. Ranking rounds took place on 10 September, while knockout rounds continued on September 13.

In the ranking rounds each archer shot 72 arrows, and was seeded according to score. In the knock-out stages each archer shot three arrows per set against an opponent, and scores were aggregated. Matches were won by the archer with the highest aggregate. Losing semifinalists competed in a bronze medal match.

== Ranking Round ==
PR = Paralympic Record.

Rank	Nation	Archers	Score
1	Bülent Korkmaz	Turkey	687
2	KJ Polish	United States	685
3	Hadi Nori	Iran	685
4	Matt Stutzman	United States	684
5	Nathan MacQueen	Great Britain	681
6	Marcel Pavlík	Slovakia	681
7	Alberto Simonelli	Italy	678
8	John Stubbs	Great Britain	676
9	Jonathon Milne	Australia	672
10	Jere Forsberg	Finland	672
11	Gianpaolo Cancelli	Italy	670
12	Andre Shelby	United States	669
13	Lee Ouk-soo	South Korea	668
14	Ai Xinliang	China	668
15	Martin Imboden	Switzerland	667
16	Cao Hanwen	China	666
17	Erdoğan Aygan	Turkey	663
18	Michael Hall	Great Britain	662
19	Matteo Bonacina	Italy	661
20	Andrey Muniz de Castro	Brazil	661
21	Guillermo Rodriguez Gonzalez	Spain	659
22	Kevin Evans	Canada	656
23	Adam Dudka	Poland	655
24	Morten Johannessen	Norway	648
25	Methasin Chailinfa	Thailand	646
26	Alexandr Medvedev	Kazakhstan	641
27	Eric Pereira	France	640
28	Shaun Anderson	South Africa	627
29	Ricardo Alexis Rosario Vazquez	Puerto Rico	623
30	Yuhaizam Yahaya	Malaysia	622
31	Thorsteinn Halldorsson	Iceland	599

== Knockout state ==
=== Finals ===
Quarter finals
1	Bülent Korkmaz (TUR)	138
9	Jonathon Milne (AUS)	139
12	Andre Shelby (USA)	142
20	Andrey Muniz de Castro (BRA)	141
14	Ai Xinliang (CHN)	142
6	Marcel Pavlík (SVK)	138
7	Alberto Simonelli (ITA)	143
18	Michael Hall (GBR)	136

Semi finals
9	Jonathon Milne (AUS)	138
12	Andre Shelby (USA)	139
14	Ai Xinliang (CHN)	144
7	Alberto Simonelli (ITA)	146

Finals
12	Andre Shelby (USA)	144 (gold)
7	Alberto Simonelli (ITA)	143 (silver)
Third place
9	Jonathon Milne (AUS)	145 (bronze)
14	Ai Xinliang (CHN)	142

=== Section 1 ===
Round of 32
17	Erdoğan Aygan (TUR)	143
16	Cao Hanwen (CHN)	142
9	Jonathon Milne (AUS)	143
24	Morten Johannessen (NOR)	136
25	Methasin Chailinfa (THA)	135
8	John Stubbs (GBR)	139

Round of 16
1	Bülent Korkmaz (TUR)	137*
17	Erdoğan Aygan (TUR)	137
9	Jonathon Milne (AUS)	137
8	John Stubbs (GBR)	129

Quarterfinals
1	Bülent Korkmaz (TUR)	138
9	Jonathon Milne (AUS)	139

=== Section 2 ===
Round of 32			Round of 16			Quarterfinals
5	Nathan MacQueen (GBR)	144
28	Shaun Anderson (RSA)	129	5	Nathan MacQueen (GBR)	133
21	Guillermo Rodriguez Gonzalez (ESP)	131	12	Andre Shelby (USA)	138
12	Andre Shelby (USA)	143				12	Andre Shelby (USA)	142
13	Lee Ouk-soo (KOR)	139				20	Andrey Muniz de Castro (BRA)	141
20	Andrey Muniz de Castro (BRA)	140	20	Andrey Muniz de Castro (BRA)	142
29	Ricardo Rosario (ESP)	129	4	Matt Stutzman (USA)	141
4	Matt Stutzman (USA)	142

=== Section 3 ===
Round of 32			Round of 16			Quarterfinals
3	Hadi Nori (IRI)	136
30	Yuhaizim Yahaya (MAS)	126	3	Hadi Nori (IRI)	134
19	Matteo Bonacina (ITA)	135	14	Ai Xinliang (CHN)	138
14	Ai Xinliang (CHN)	143				14	Ai Xinliang (CHN)	142
11	Gianpaolo Cancelli (ITA)	146				6	Marcel Pavlík (SVK)	138
22	Kevin Evans (CAN)	128	11	Gianpaolo Cancelli (ITA)	134
27	Eric Pereira (FRA)	136	6	Marcel Pavlík (SVK)	140
6	Marcel Pavlík (SVK)	141

=== Section 4 ===
Round of 32			Round of 16			Quarterfinals
7	Alberto Simonelli (ITA)	137
26	Alexandr Medvedev (KAZ)	121	7	Alberto Simonelli (ITA)	140
23	Adam Dudka (POL)	136	10	Jere Forsberg (FIN)	136
10	Jere Forsberg (FIN)	141				7	Alberto Simonelli (ITA)	143
18	Martin Imboden (SUI)	139				15	Michael Hall (GBR)	136
15	Michael Hall (GBR)	141	15	Michael Hall (GBR)	139
31	Thorsteinn Halldorssonn (ISL)	129	2	KJ Polish (USA)	133
2	KJ Polish (USA)	143
