= Archery at the 2000 Summer Paralympics – Men's individual W1 =

Men's individual W1 at the XI Paralympic Games
- Venue: Sydney, Australia
- Dates: 20 to 25 October 2000
- Competitors: 11 from 7 nations

Medalists
1st place, gold medalist(s)		Zdenek Sebek	Czech Republic
2nd place, silver medalist(s)		Olivier Hatem	France
3rd place, bronze medalist(s)		Dejan Miladinovic	France

The men's individual W1 archery event was held from 20 to 25 October 2000 in Sydney, Australia.

== Ranking round ==
Rank	Competitor	Points	Notes
1	Zdenek Sebek (CZE)	643	
2	Larry Townes (USA)	617	
3	Olivier Hatem (FRA)	609	
4	Dejan Miladinovic (FRA)	600	
5	Reiner Schneider (GER)	596	
6	John Cavanagh (GBR)	596	
7	Koichi Minami (JPN)	593	
8	Aaron Cross (USA)	575	
9	Kurt MacCaferri (SUI)	566	
10	Sid Williams (USA)	528	
11	Bernard Saramon (FRA)	518	

== Competition bracket ==
Round of 16
Kurt MacCaferri (SUI)	117
Aaron Cross (USA)	156
John Cavanagh (GBR)	127
Bernard Saramon (FRA)	129
Sid Williams (USA)	132
Koichi Minami (JPN)	152

Quarterfinals
Zdenek Sebek (CZE)	109
Aaron Cross (USA)	91
Reiner Schneider (GER)	102
Dejan Miladinovic (FRA)	105
Olivier Hatem (FRA)	92
Bernard Saramon (FRA)	81
Koichi Minami (JPN)	93
Larry Townes (USA)	96

Semifinals
Zdenek Sebek (CZE)	110
Dejan Miladinovic (FRA)	105
Olivier Hatem (FRA)	97
Larry Townes (USA)	90

Final
Zdenek Sebek (CZE)	109
Olivier Hatem (FRA)	97
Third place
Dejan Miladinovic (FRA)	102
Larry Townes (USA)	94
