= Archery at the 2016 Summer Paralympics – Women's individual compound open =

Archery, Women's compound open at the XV Paralympic Games
- Dates: September 10–16, 2016
- Competitors: 17

Medalists
1st place, gold medalist(s)		Zhou Jiamin	China
2nd place, silver medalist(s)		Lin Yueshan	China
3rd place, bronze medalist(s)		Kim Mi-soon	South Korea

The Women's individual compound open archery discipline at the 2016 Summer Paralympics was contested from September 10 to September 16. Ranking rounds took place on 10 September, while single elimination knockout rounds continued on September 16.

In the ranking rounds each archer shot 72 arrows, and was seeded according to score. In the knock-out stages each archer shot three arrows in each of five sets against an opponent, and scores were aggregated. Matches were won by the higher aggregate scorer. Losing semifinalists competed in a bronze medal match.

== Ranking Round ==
PR = Paralympic Record.

Rank	Archers	Nation	Score
1	Zhou Jiamin	China	674
2	Somayeh Abbaspour	Iran	657
3	Jane Karla Gogel	Brazil	655
4	Karen Van Nest	Canada	654
5	Zandra Reppe	Sweden	652
6	Lin Yueshan	China	651
7	Eleonora Sarti	Italy	649
8	Handan Biroğlu	Turkey	648
9	Kseniya Markitantova	Ukraine	645
10	Jodie Grinham	Great Britain	643
11	Choi Yuen Lung	Hong Kong	642
12	Kim Mi-soon	South Korea	641
13	Syahidah Alim Nur	Singapore	626
14	Nako Hirasawa	Japan	624
15	Lucia Kupczyk	Germany	607
16	María Carmen Rubio	Spain	600
17	Sam Tucker	United States	597

== Knockout stage ==
=== Final four ===
Semi final
1	Zhou Jiamin (CHN)	138
12	Kim Mi-soon (KOR)	132
6	Lin Yueshan (CHN)	137
2	Somayeh Abbaspour (IRI)	129

Gold medal match
1	Zhou Jiamin (CHN)	138 (gold)
6	Lin Yueshan (CHN)	138 (silver)
bronze medal match
12	Kim Mi-soon (KOR)	140 (bronze)
2	Somayeh Abbaspour (IRI)	138

=== Section 1 ===
Preliminary round
17	Sam Tucker (USA)	124
16	María Carmen Rubio (ESP)	133

Round of 16
1	Zhou Jiamin (CHN)	144
16	María Carmen Rubio (ESP)	136
9	Kseniya Markitantova (UKR)	137
8	Handan Biroğlu (TUR)	139
5	Zandra Reppe (SWE)	135
12	Kim Mi-soon (KOR)	142
13	Syahidah Alim Nur (SIN)	140
4	Karen van Nest (CAN)	135

Quarter final
1	Zhou Jiamin (CHN)	144
8	Handan Biroğlu (TUR)	132
12	Kim Mi-soon (KOR)	137
13	Syahidah Alim Nur (SIN)	135

Semi final
1	Zhou Jiamin (CHN)	138
12	Kim Mi-soon (KOR)	132

=== Section 2 ===
Round of 16
3	Jane Karla Gogel (BRA)	140
14	Nako Hirasawa (JPN)	131
11	Choi Yuen Lung (HKG)	130
6	Lin Yueshan (CHN)	141
7	Eleonora Sarti (ITA)	132
10	Jodie Grinham (GBR)	133
15	Lucia Kupczyk (GER)	129
2	Somayeh Abbaspour (IRI)	140

Quarter final
3	Jane Karla Gogel (BRA)	139
6	Lin Yueshan (CHN)	141
10	Jodie Grinham (GBR)	136
2	Somayeh Abbaspour (IRI)	137

Semi final
6	Lin Yueshan (CHN)	137
2	Somayeh Abbaspour (IRI)	129
