= Iran at the 2016 Summer Paralympics =

- IPC code: IRI
- NPC: I.R. Iran National Paralympic Committee
- Website: www.paralympic.ir

in Rio de Janeiro
- Competitors: 110 in 12 sports
- Flag bearer: Eshrat Kordestani
- Medals Ranked 15th: Gold 8 Silver 9 Bronze 7 Total 24

Summer Paralympics appearances (overview)
- 1988; 1992; 1996; 2000; 2004; 2008; 2012; 2016; 2020; 2024

Iran competed at the 2016 Summer Paralympics in Rio de Janeiro, Brazil, from 7 September to 18 September 2016.

== Competitors ==
Sport	Men	Women	Total
Archery	4	3	7
Athletics	23	3	26
Cycling	1	0	1
Football 5-a-side	10	0	10
Football 7-a-side	12	0	12
Judo	3	0	3
Paracanoeing	0	1	1
Powerlifting	6	0	6
Shooting	2	4	6
Swimming	1	0	1
Volleyball	12	12	24
Wheelchair basketball	12	0	12
Total	87	23	110

== Medalists ==
Medal	Name	Sport	Event	Date
Gold	Gholamreza Rahimi	Archery	Men's individual recurve open	13 September
Gold	Zahra Nemati	Archery	Women's Individual recurve open	15 September
Gold	Mohammad Khalvandi	Athletics	Men's Javelin Throw–F57	12 September
Gold	Majid Farzin	Powerlifting	Men's 80 kg	12 September
Gold	Siamand Rahman	Powerlifting	Men's +107 kg	14 September
Gold	Sareh Javanmardi	Shooting	Women's 10m air pistol SH1	9 September
Gold	Sareh Javanmardi	Shooting	Mixed 50m pistol SH1	14 September
Gold	Sitting Volleyball team: Mehrzad Mehravan; Morteza Mehrzad; Majid Lashkarisanami; Davoud Alipourian (c); Abolfazl Oliyaei; Ramezan Salehihajikolaei; Sadegh Bigdeli; Meisam Ali Pour; Hossein Golestani; Isa Zirahi; Arash Khormali; Mahdi Babadi	Sitting volleyball	Sitting volleyball	18 September
Silver	Zahra Nemati; Ebrahim Ranjbarkivaj	Archery	Team recurve open	11 September
Silver	Saman Pakbaz	Athletics	Men's Shot Put – F12	8 September
Silver	Alireza Ghaleh Naseri	Athletics	Men's Discus Throw – F56	10 September
Silver	Sajad Mohammadian	Athletics	Men's Shot Put – F42	12 September
Silver	Abdollah Heydari	Athletics	Men's Javelin Throw – F57	12 September
Silver	Sajad Nikparast	Athletics	Men's Javelin Throw – F13	14 September
Silver	Hamed Amiri	Athletics	Men's Shot Put – F55	16 September
Silver	Football 5-a-side team: Meysam Shojaeiyan; Behzad Zadaliasghari; Mohammadreza Mehninasab; Hossein Rajabpour (c); Ahmadreza Shahhosseini; Sadegh Rahimighasr; Amir Pourrazavi; Mohammad Heidari; Rasool Baseri; Akbar Shoushtari	Football 5-a-side	Football 5-a-side	17 September
Silver	Football 7-a-side team: Moslem Khazaei Pirsarabi; Hashem Rastegarimobin (c); Lotfollah Jangjou; Rasoul Atashafrouz; Sadegh Hassani Baghi; Mohammad Kharat; Behnam Sohrabi; Hossein Tiz Bor; Mehdi Jamali; Jasem Bakhshi; Hassan Safari; Farzad Mehri; Moslem Akbari; Babak Safari	Football 7-a-side	Football 7-a-side	16 September
Bronze	Ebrahim Ranjbarkivaj	Archery	Men's individual recurve open	13 September
Bronze	Peyman Nasiri Bazanjani	Athletics	Men's 1500m T20	13 September
Bronze	Asadollah Azimi	Athletics	Men's Shot Put – F53	14 September
Bronze	Javad Hardani	Athletics	Men's Javelin Throw – F38	15 September
Bronze	Mohsen Kaedi	Athletics	Men's Javelin Throw – F34	15 September
Bronze	Javid Ehsani Shakib	Athletics	Men's Shot Put – F57	17 September
Bronze	Ali Sadeghzadeh	Powerlifting	Men's –107 kg	14 September

Medals by sport
Sport	Gold medal	Silver medal	Bronze medal	Total
Archery	2	1	1	4
Powerlifting	2	0	1	3
Shooting	2	0	0	2
Athletics	1	6	5	12
Sitting volleyball	1	0	0	1
Football 5-a-side	0	1	0	1
Football 7-a-side	0	1	0	1
Total	8	9	7	24

Medals by date
Day	Date	Gold medal	Silver medal	Bronze medal	Total
1	8 September	0	1	0	1
2	9 September	1	0	0	1
3	10 September	0	1	0	1
4	11 September	0	1	0	1
5	12 September	2	2	0	4
6	13 September	1	0	2	3
7	14 September	2	1	2	5
8	15 September	1	0	2	3
9	16 September	0	2	0	2
10	17 September	0	1	1	2
11	18 September	1	0	0	1
Total		8	9	7	24

Medals by gender^{(Comparison graphs)}
Gender	1st place, gold medalist(s)	2nd place, silver medalist(s)	3rd place, bronze medalist(s)	Total	Percentage
Male	5	8	7	20	83.33%
Female	3	0	0	3	12.50%
Mixed	0	1	0	1	4.17%
Total	8	9	7	24	100%

== The death of Para-cyclist ==
Iranian Para-cyclist Bahman Golbarnezhad died following an accident during men's C4/C5 road race at the Rio 2016 Paralympics. He was involved in a serious crash on Saturday (17 September) and sustained severe injuries to his neck. The 48-year-old rider received emergency treatment at the scene before being transported to hospital where he succumbed to his injuries. Following Golbarnezhad's passing, the Iranian flag has been lowered to half-mast in the Paralympic Village. The Paralympic flag will also be flown at half-mast in the Paralympic Village and at the Riocentro venue, where Iran played Bosnia and Herzegovina in the sitting volleyball gold medal match on Sunday (18 September).

== Disability classifications ==
Every participant at the Paralympics has their disability grouped into one of five disability categories; amputation, the condition may be congenital or sustained through injury or illness; cerebral palsy; wheelchair athletes, there is often overlap between this and other categories; visual impairment, including blindness; Les autres, any physical disability that does not fall strictly under one of the other categories, for example dwarfism or multiple sclerosis. Each Paralympic sport then has its own classifications, dependent upon the specific physical demands of competition. Events are given a code, made of numbers and letters, describing the type of event and classification of the athletes competing. Some sports, such as athletics, divide athletes by both the category and severity of their disabilities, other sports, for example swimming, group competitors from different categories together, the only separation being based on the severity of the disability.

== Archery ==
Iran earned a spot in archery at both the 2016 Olympic and Paralympic Games at the 2015 Asian Archery Championships as a result of performance of Zahra Nemati at the event. She also carried the Iranian flag into the Olympic opening ceremony. Should she compete in both, she will be the first archer to do so since Italy's Paola Fantato did this at the 1996 Summer Paralympics. She took up the sport in 2006, two years after a spinal-cord injury that occurred during an accident. Prior to that, she competed in taekwondo where she had a black belt. Six months after taking up the sport, she won the Iranian national championships. She competed at the 2011 Archery World Championships, and set four world records at the Italy hosted event. She will go to Rio as a defending Paralympic gold medalist in the women's individual recurve W1/W2, and bronze medalist in the women's team recurve open. She also won gold at the 2013 World Championships in Bangkok, Thailand. She also won a bronze medal at the same event.

Men

Athlete	Event	Ranking round		Round of 32	Round of 16	Quarterfinals	Semifinals	Finals	
Athlete	Event	Score	Seed	Opposition score	Opposition score	Opposition score	Opposition score	Opposition score	Rank
Gholamreza Rahimi	Individual recurve open	624	5	Kim (KOR); W 6–2	Yu (CHN); W 6–0	Ueyama (JPN); W 6–2	Ranjbar (IRI); W 6–4	Netsiri (THA); W 7–3	1st place, gold medalist(s)
Ebrahim Ranjbar	Individual recurve open	637	1	Jonasts (LAT); W 6–2	Phillips (GBR); W 6–4	Sawicki (POL); W 7–3	Rahimi (IRI); L 6–4	Rezende (BRA); W 7–1	3rd place, bronze medalist(s)
Majid Kakoosh	Individual compound W1	628	7	—N/a	Hatem (FRA); W 131–129	Drahoninsky (CZE); L 144–124	Did not advance		
Hadi Nori	Individual compound open	685	3	Yahaya (MAS); W 136–126	Ai (CHN); L 138–134	Did not advance			

Women

Athlete	Event	Ranking round		Round of 32	Round of 16	Quarterfinals	Semifinals	Finals	
Athlete	Event	Score	Seed	Opposition score	Opposition score	Opposition score	Opposition score	Opposition score	Rank
Mohadeseh Kohansal	Individual recurve open	541	24	Eroglu (TUR); W 6–2	Dzoba-Balyan (UKR); L 0–6	Did not advance			
Zahra Nemati	Individual recurve open	627	2	Valiyeva (AZE); W 6–0	Jo (KOR); W 6–0	Mijno (ITA); W 6–4	Lee (KOR); W 6–0	Wu (CHN); W 6–4	1st place, gold medalist(s)
Somayeh Abbaspour	Individual compound open	657	2	Bye	Kupczyk (GER); W 140–129	Grinham (GBR); W 137–136	Lin (CHN); L 137–129	Kim (KOR); L 140–138	4

Mixed

Athlete	Event	Ranking Round		Round of 16	Quarterfinals	Semifinals	Finals	
Athlete	Event	Score	Seed	Opposition Score	Opposition Score	Opposition Score	Opposition Score	Rank
Zahra Nemati; Ebrahim Ranjbar	Team recurve open	1264	1	France (FRA); W 6–0	Great Britain (GBR); W 5–4	Italy (ITA); W 6–0	China (CHN); L 3–5	2nd place, silver medalist(s)
Somayeh Abbaspour; Hadi Nori	Team compound open	1342	1	Bye	South Korea (KOR); L 148–153	Did not advance		

== Athletics ==
The following 24 men and 3 woman will represent Iran at 2016 Summer Paralympics. A total of 27 athletes will compete for Iran at the 2016 Summer Paralympics.

Men

Track

Athlete (Guide)	Events	Heat		Final	
Athlete (Guide)	Events	Time	Rank	Time	Rank
Hamid Eslami (Hossein Salehi Manesh)	1500m T11	DSQ		Did not advance	
Peyman Nasiri Bazanjani	1500m T20	—N/a		3:56.24	3rd place, bronze medalist(s)
Ahmad Ojaghloo	100m T47	11.22	5 Q	11.27	8

Field

Athlete	Events	Result	Rank
Saman Pakbaz	Shot Put – F12	15.98	2nd place, silver medalist(s)
Yunes Seifipour	Shot Put – F32	8.40	5
Siamak Saleh-Farajzadeh	Shot Put – F34	10.65	6
Mohsen Hosseinipanah	Shot Put – F35	13.14	5
Mehran Nekouei Majd	Shot Put – F35	14.54	4
Sajad Mohammadian	Shot Put – F42	14.31	2nd place, silver medalist(s)
Asadollah Azimi	Shot Put – F53	8.14	3rd place, bronze medalist(s)
Alireza Mokhtari	Shot Put – F53	7.87 SB	4
Jalil Bagheri	Shot Put – F55	11.16 SB	6
Hamed Amiri	Shot Put – F55	11.40 WR	2nd place, silver medalist(s)
Javid Ehsani Shakib	Shot Put – F57	14.13 PB	3rd place, bronze medalist(s)
Mohsen Kaedi	Shot Put – F34	10.70	5
Mohsen Kaedi	Javelin Throw – F34	33.42 SB	3rd place, bronze medalist(s)
Sajjad Nikparast	Javelin Throw – F13	62.74 SB	2nd place, silver medalist(s)
Javad Hardani	Javelin Throw – F38	48.46 PB	3rd place, bronze medalist(s)
Mohammad Fathi Ganji	Javelin Throw – F46	54.67 PB	4
Mohammad Khalvandi	Javelin Throw – F57	46.12 WR	1st place, gold medalist(s)
Abdollah Heydari	Javelin Throw – F57	43.77	2nd place, silver medalist(s)
Ali Mohammadyari	Discus Throw Throw – F56	NM	-
Alireza Ghaleh Naseri	Discus Throw Throw – F56	44.04	2nd place, silver medalist(s)
Ali Olfatnia	Long Jump – T37	5.52 SB	9

Women

Athlete	Events	Result	Rank
Batul Jahangiri	Shot Put – F33	4.57	6
Hashemieh Mottaghian	Javelin Throw – F56	19.83	4
Maryam Soltani	Javelin Throw – F34	15.00	7

== Cycling ==
With one pathway for qualification being one highest ranked NPCs on the UCI Para-Cycling male and female Nations Ranking Lists on 31 December 2014, Iran qualified for the 2016 Summer Paralympics in Rio, assuming they continued to meet all other eligibility requirements.

Athlete	Event	Time	Rank
Bahman Golbarnezhad	Men's road race C4-5	DNF	-
Bahman Golbarnezhad	Men's time trial C4	46:03.62	14

== 5-a-side football ==
Iran qualified for the Paralympics after finishing first at the 2015 IBSA Blind Football Asian Championships. Iran opened round robin play 5–0 win against Malaysia. Next, they drew 0–0 with Japan. Their third game saw them crush India 10–0. They then drew 0–0 with China. Their last game of group play was a 4–0 win against South Korea. Their win put them second in round robin play. They met China in a single placement final, which they won in a 1–0 penalty shootout. Iran's Ahmadreza Shahhosseini was given the tournament's Golden Boot as the tournament's top scorer. The team was coached by Javad Felfeli with Mohammadreza Shaddelbasir the team's guide.

The following is the Iran squad in the football 5-a-side tournament of the 2016 Summer Paralympics.

No.	Pos.	Player	Class	Date of birth (age)
1	GK	Meysam Shojaeiyan	Sighted	22 October 1988 (aged 27)
2	DF	Amir Pourrazavi	B1	26 March 1985 (aged 31)
4	DF	Mohammadreza Mehninasab	B1	21 April 1995 (aged 21)
7	FW	Hossein Rajabpour	B1	5 September 1986 (aged 30)
8	DF	Mohammad Heidari	B1	21 March 1984 (aged 32)
9	FW	Sadegh Rahimighasr	B1	27 May 1995 (aged 21)
10	FW	Behzad Zadaliasghari	B1	5 June 1988 (aged 28)
11	DF	Ahmadreza Shahhosseini	B1	6 March 1990 (aged 26)
12	FW	Rasool Baseri	B1	28 July 1996 (aged 20)
13	GK	Akbar Shoushtari	Sighted	12 August 1984 (aged 32)

Pos	Team	Pld	W	D	L	GF	GA	GD	Pts	Qualification
1	Brazil (H)	3	2	1	0	5	1	+4	7	Semi finals
2	Iran	3	1	2	0	2	0	+2	5	Semi finals
3	Turkey	3	0	2	1	1	3	−2	2	5th–6th place match
4	Morocco	3	0	1	2	2	6	−4	1	7th–8th place match

Source: Paralympic.org
(H) Hosts
9 September 2016
16:00

Turkey	0–0	Iran
	Report

Olympic Tennis Centre, Rio de Janeiro
Attendance: 2,811
Referee: Lucio Morgado (Brazil)

11 September 2016
9:00

Morocco	0–2	Iran
	Report	Rajabpour 13'; Zadaliasghari 14'

Olympic Tennis Centre, Rio de Janeiro
Attendance: 2,374
Referee: Mariano Travaglino (Argentina)

13 September 2016
9:00

Brazil	0–0	Iran
	Report

Olympic Tennis Centre, Rio de Janeiro
Attendance: 2,355
Referee: Mariano Travaglino (Argentina)

Semi-final

15 September 2016
20:00

Argentina	0–0	Iran
	Report
Penalties
Espinillo (penalty missed); Velo (penalty scored); Véliz (penalty missed)	1–2	(penalty scored) Rahimighasr; (penalty scored) Shahhosseini

Olympic Tennis Centre, Rio de Janeiro
Attendance: 2,907
Referee: Lucio Morgado (Brazil)

Gold medal match

17 September 2016
17:00

Brazil	1–0	Iran
Ricardinho 12'	Report

Olympic Tennis Centre, Rio de Janeiro
Attendance: 3,118
Referee: Mariano Travaglino (Argentina)

== 7-a-side football ==
Iran qualified for the 2016 Rio Games following the suspension of Russia. The IPC ruled that there could not be a redraw for the groups. This resulted in Iran being put into Group A with the Netherlands, Argentina and the United States.

Iran goes to Rio as reigning 2008 and 2012 Paralympic bronze medalists. They had missed out on qualification for Rio initially because they had visa issues that did not allow them to participate in the IFCPF World Championships, and there were not enough teams to allow for a viable Asian qualifying competition. The IFCPF said in their rationale for picking Iran that it would increase continental inclusion from 2 to 3, and they would be replacing one potential medalist with another potential medalist. Iran goes into the tournament ranked 12th in the world.

Pos	Team	Pld	W	D	L	GF	GA	GD	Pts	Qualification
1	Iran	3	3	0	0	7	1	+6	9	Semi finals
2	Netherlands	3	1	1	1	4	4	0	4	Semi finals
3	Argentina	3	1	0	2	4	7	−3	3	5th–6th place match
4	United States	3	0	1	2	4	7	−3	1	7th–8th place match

Source: Paralympic.org

== Judo ==
Athlete	Event	Preliminaries	Quarterfinals	Semifinals	Repechage Final	Final / BM	
Athlete	Event	Opposition Result	Opposition Result	Opposition Result	Opposition Result	Opposition Result	Rank
Seyed Omid Nouri Jafari	Men's 81 kg	Junk (GER); W 1113–0001	Lee (KOR); L 0003–0002	Did not advance	Khalilov (UZB); W 0111–0021	Kosinov (UKR); L 000–100	5
Hamed Alizadeh	Men's 100 kg	Porter (USA); W 0s1–110	Fernandez Sastre (CUB); L 11s3–0s2	Did not advance	Abdullakhanli (AZE); L 0s1–0s2	Did not advance	
Hamzeh Nadri	Men's +100 kg	Montero (VEN); W 0–101	Jimenez (CUB); L 0–0s1	Did not advance	Albdoor (IRQ); W 0s4–100	Masaki (JPN); L 0s2–100	5

== Paracanoeing ==
Iran earned a qualifying spot at the 2016 Summer Paralympics in this sport following their performance at the 2015 ICF Canoe Sprint & Paracanoe World Championships in Milan, Italy where the top six finishers in each Paralympic event earned a qualifying spot for their nation. Shahla Behrouzirad earned the spot for Iran after finishing sixth in the women's KL3 event.

Women

Athlete	Event	Heats		Semi-Finals		Final	
Athlete	Event	Time	Rank	Time	Rank	Time	Rank
Shahla Behrouzirad	Women's KL3	58.900	5	56.580	5	Did not advance	

== Powerlifting ==
Siamand Rahman worked on qualifying for the 2016 Games at the 2015 IPC Powerlifting Asian Open Championships. Competing in the men's over 107 kg event, he set a new world record of 295 kg on his way to winning gold.

Athlete	Event	Total lifted	Rank
Hamzeh Mohammadi	Men's –65 kg	187 kg	4
Majid Farzin	Men's –80 kg	240 kg WR	1st place, gold medalist(s)
Seyedhamed Solhipouravanji	Men's –88 kg	NM	-
Saman Razi	Men's –97 kg	221 kg	4
Ali Sadeghzadeh	Men's –107 kg	226 kg	3rd place, bronze medalist(s)
Siamand Rahman	Men's +107 kg	310 kg WR PR	1st place, gold medalist(s)

== Shooting ==
The first opportunity to qualify for shooting at the Rio Games took place at the 2014 IPC Shooting World Championships in Suhl. Shooters earned spots for their NPC. Iran earned a qualifying spot at this event in the P2 – 10m Air Pistol Women SH1 event as a result of Sareh Javanmardi winning a gold medal.

The country sent shooters to 2015 IPC IPC Shooting World Cup in Osijek, Croatia, where Rio direct qualification was also available. They earned a qualifying spot at this event based on the performance of Samira Eram in the P2 – 10m Air Pistol Women SH1 event. Because no woman qualified based on the criteria in P3 – 25m Pistol Mixed SH1 event at this competition, an extra spot on the women's side was given in the P4 – 50m Pistol Mixed SH1. Iran's Alieh Mahmoudi acquired this spot for her country.

The third opportunity for direct qualification for shooters to the Rio Paralympics took place at the 2015 IPC IPC Shooting World Cup in Sydney, Australia. At this competition, Mahdi Zamani earned a qualifying spot for their country in the P1- Men's 10m Air Pistol SH1 event. Masoumeh Khodabakhshi earned another qualifying spot for Iran in the R4- Mixed 10m Air Rifle Standing SH2 event.

Athlete	Event	Qualification		Final	
Athlete	Event	Score	Rank	Score	Rank
Mahdi Zamanishurabi	Men's 10m air pistol SH1	551-7x	24	Did not advance	
Sareh Javanmardi	Women's 10m air pistol SH1	376-8x	2 Q	193.4 FPR	1st place, gold medalist(s)
Sareh Javanmardi	Mixed 50m pistol SH1	534-3x	3 Q	189.5	1st place, gold medalist(s)
Samira Eram	Women's 10m air pistol SH1	358-4x	16	Did not advance	
Alieh Mahmoudikordkheili	Women's 10m air pistol SH1	376-9x	1 Q	72.7	8
Alieh Mahmoudikordkheili	Mixed 50m pistol SH1	522-7x	12	Did not advance	
Masoumeh Khodabakhshi	Mixed 10m Air Rifle Standing SH2	627.0	14	Did not advance	

== Swimming ==
Athlete	Events	Heats		Final	
Athlete	Events	Time	Rank	Time	Rank
Shahin Izadyar	50 m freestyle S10	25.32	4	Did not advance	
Shahin Izadyar	100 m breaststroke SB9	1:09.63	5 Q	1:10.82	8

== Sitting volleyball ==
=== Men ===
Iran men's national sitting volleyball team qualified for the 2016 Games at the World Championships. Iran men's national sitting volleyball team were also in the qualification run for the 2016 Summer Paralympics at the 2014 Asian Para-Games, losing the gold medal match in sets of 25–12, 25–20, 29–27 against China men's national sitting volleyball team.

Pos	Team	Pld	W	L	Pts	SW	SL	SR	SPW	SPL	SPR	Qualification
1	Iran	3	3	0	6	9	0	MAX	228	173	1.318	Semi-finals
2	Bosnia and Herzegovina	3	2	1	5	6	3	2.000	206	184	1.120	Semi-finals
3	Ukraine	3	1	2	4	3	8	0.375	237	265	0.894	Classification 5th / 6th
4	China	3	0	3	3	2	9	0.222	216	265	0.815	Classification 7th / 8th

Source: Paralympic.org

10 September 2016; 10:00	Iran	3–0	China	Riocentro - Pavilion 6, Rio de Janeiro
10 September 2016; 10:00	(25–22, 25–13, 25–14); Report			Riocentro - Pavilion 6, Rio de Janeiro

12 September 2016; 20:30	Iran	3–0	Bosnia and Herzegovina	Riocentro - Pavilion 6, Rio de Janeiro
12 September 2016; 20:30	(25–17, 25–22, 25–17); Report			Riocentro - Pavilion 6, Rio de Janeiro

14 September 2016; 20:30	Ukraine	0–3	Iran	Riocentro - Pavilion 6, Rio de Janeiro
14 September 2016; 20:30	(22–25, 26–28, 20–25); Report			Riocentro - Pavilion 6, Rio de Janeiro

=== Women ===
Iran women's national sitting volleyball team qualified for the 2016 Summer Paralympics after reaching the finals of the 2014 Asian Para Games, the first time the women's team had qualified for the Paralympics. They won the event, after beating China who had previously qualified for the 2016 Games at the world championships earlier in the year in sets of 25–15, 25–12, and 25–15. Maleki Zeinab Dizicheh was one of the team's key players in the tournament. In the year before the Games, the team trained in Isfahan, where there were 20 members at camp along with players from the junior national team. Warm up events for the team include the March 2015 Intercontinental Cup.

Pos	Team	Pld	W	L	Pts	SW	SL	SR	SPW	SPL	SPR	Qualification
1	China	3	3	0	6	9	2	4.500	246	169	1.456	Semi-finals
2	United States	3	2	1	5	8	3	2.667	256	156	1.641	Semi-finals
3	Iran	3	1	2	4	3	6	0.500	160	197	0.812	Classification 5th / 6th
4	Rwanda	3	0	3	3	0	9	0.000	85	225	0.378	Classification 7th / 8th

Source: Paralympic.org

10 September 2016; 14:00	United States	3-0	Iran	Riocentro - Pavilion 6, Rio de Janeiro
10 September 2016; 14:00	(25–17, 25–13, 25–9); Report			Riocentro - Pavilion 6, Rio de Janeiro

12 September 2016; 10:00	Rwanda	0–3	Iran	Riocentro - Pavilion 6, Rio de Janeiro
12 September 2016; 10:00	(10–25, 19–25, 18–25); Report			Riocentro - Pavilion 6, Rio de Janeiro

14 September 2016; 14:00	Iran	0–3	China	Riocentro - Pavilion 6, Rio de Janeiro
14 September 2016; 14:00	(16–25, 19–25, 11–25); Report			Riocentro - Pavilion 6, Rio de Janeiro

== Wheelchair basketball ==
The Iran men's national wheelchair basketball team has qualified for the 2016 Rio Paralympics. During the draw, Brazil had the choice of which group they wanted to be in. They were partnered with Spain, who would be in the group Brazil did not select. Brazil chose Group B, which included Iran, the United States, Great Britain, Germany and Algeria. That left Spain in Group A with Australia, Canada, Turkey, the Netherlands and Japan.

Pos	Team	Pld	W	L	PF	PA	PD	Pts	Qualification
1	United States	5	5	0	402	206	+196	10	Quarter-finals
2	Great Britain	5	4	1	364	263	+101	9	Quarter-finals
3	Brazil (H)	5	2	3	309	314	−5	7 (Note: Head-to-head record: Brazil 3 pts, +11 PD; Germany 3 pts, +6 PD; Iran 3 pts, −17 PD)	Quarter-finals
4	Germany	5	2	3	337	314	+23	7	Quarter-finals
5	Iran	5	2	3	295	361	−66	7	9th/10th place playoff
6	Algeria	5	0	5	187	436	−249	5	11th/12th place playoff

Source: Paralympic.org
Rules for classification: 1) Points; 2) Head-to-head results; 3) Points difference; 4) Points scored.
(H) Hosts

== See also ==
- Iran at the 2016 Summer Olympics
