= Archery at the 2004 Summer Paralympics – Men's individual W1 =

Men's Individual W1 at the XII Paralympic Games
- Paralympic Archery
- Venue: Olympic Baseball Centre (Athens)
- Dates: 21–25 September
- Competitors: 12 from 10 nations

Medalists
1st place, gold medalist(s)		John Cavanagh	Great Britain
2nd place, silver medalist(s)		Anders Groenberg	Sweden
3rd place, bronze medalist(s)		Jeffrey Fabry	United States

The men's individual W1 archery competition at the 2004 Summer Paralympics was held from 21 to 25 September at the Olympic Baseball Centre (Athens).

The event was won by John Cavanagh, representing Great Britain.

== Results ==
=== Ranking Round ===
Rank	Competitor	Points	Notes
1	Jeffrey Fabry (USA)	667	WR
2	Anders Groenberg (SWE)	661	
3	Zdenek Sebek (CZE)	643	
4	Olivier Hatem (FRA)	628	
5	John Cavanagh (GBR)	624	
6	Koichi Minami (JPN)	617	
7	Eric Hassberg (GER)	606	
8	Robert Lehner (SUI)	603	
9	Jean-Pierre Antonios (FIN)	603	
10	Aaron Cross (USA)	587	
11	Chuck Lear (USA)	585	
12	Daniele Cassiani (ITA)	386	

=== Competition bracket ===
Round of 16
Jean-Pierre Antonios (FIN)	160
Robert Lehner (SUI)	155
John Cavanagh (GBR)	164
Daniele Cassiani (ITA)	114
Chuck Lear (USA)	133
Koichi Minami (JPN)	150
Eric Hassberg (GER)^{[2]}	150
Aaron Cross (USA)	150

Quarterfinals
Jeffrey Fabry (USA)	109
Jean-Pierre Antonios (FIN)	102
John Cavanagh (GBR)	102
Olivier Hatem (FRA)	93
Zdenek Sebek (CZE)	103
Koichi Minami (JPN)	95
Eric Hassberg (GER)	102
Anders Groenberg (SWE)^{[3]}	102

Semifinals
Jeffrey Fabry (USA)	108
John Cavanagh (GBR)^{[1]}	108
Zdenek Sebek (CZE)	96
Anders Groenberg (SWE)	99

Final
John Cavanagh (GBR)	108
Anders Groenberg (SWE)	102
Third place
Jeffrey Fabry (USA)	108
Zdenek Sebek (CZE)	96

^{[1]} Decided by additional arrows: 6:9
^{[2]} Decided by additional arrows: 9:8
^{[3]} Decided by additional arrows: 9:9,8:8,8:X
