= Jodie Grinham =

British Paralympic archer

Jodie Grinham MBE
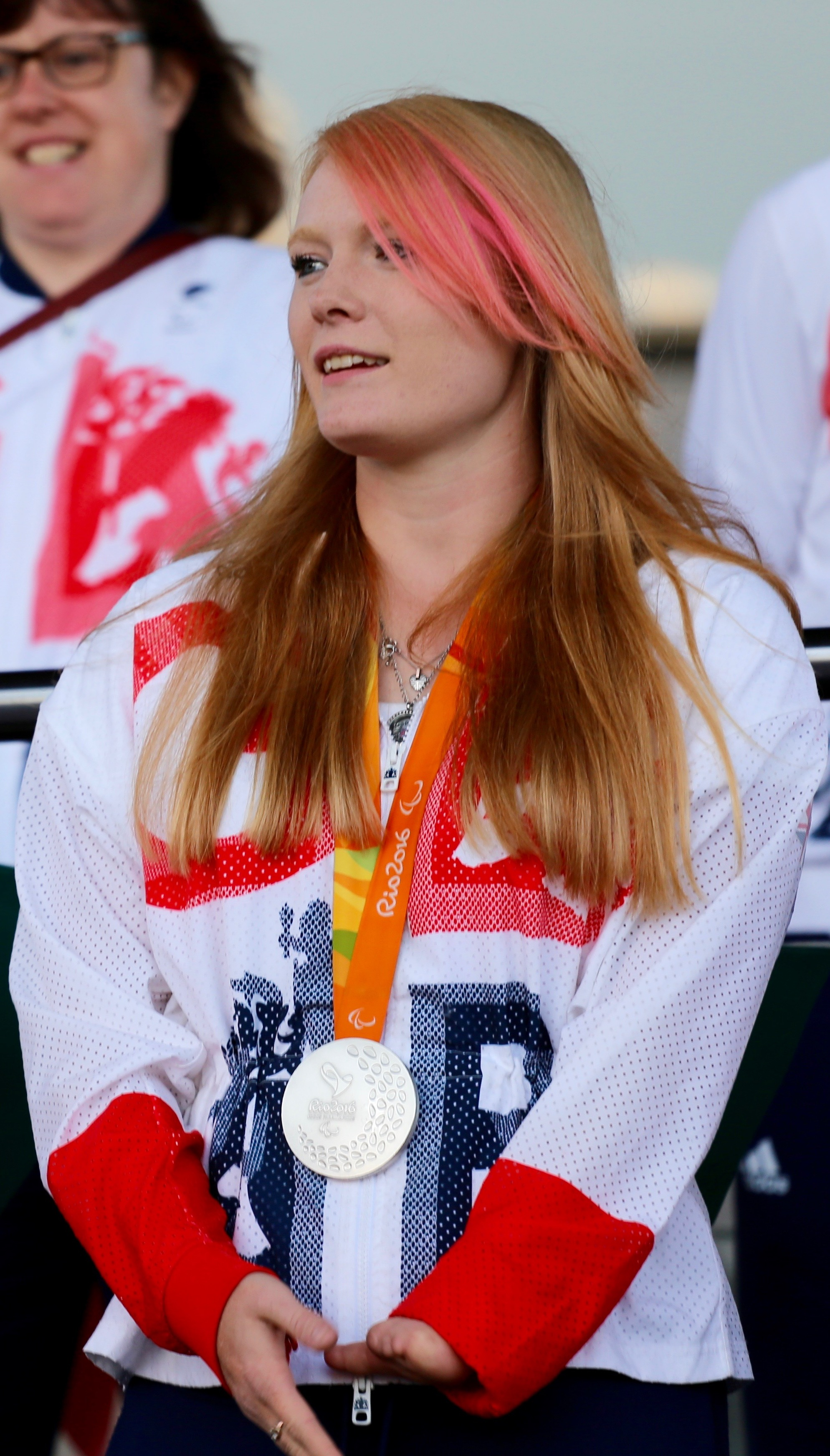
- Jodie Grinham with her 2016 Paralympic silver medal

Personal information
- Born: 26 July 1993 (age 33) Haverfordwest, Pembrokeshire, Wales
- Education: BPP Law School

Sport
- Country: United Kingdom
- Sport: Archery
- Event: Compound archery
Medal record
Women's Archery
Representing Great Britain
Paralympic Games
Gold medal – first place	2024 Paris	Mixed team compound
Silver medal – second place	2016 Rio	Mixed team compound
Bronze medal – third place	2024 Paris	Individual compound
World Championships
Bronze medal – third place	2025 Gwangju	Individual
- Updated on 19 November 2024

Jodie Michelle Grinham (born 26 July 1993) is a British archer who represents Great Britain in the Summer Paralympics. She won a silver medal at the 2016 Summer Paralympics in Rio de Janeiro and at the 2024 Summer Paralympics she won team gold and individual bronze, while seven months pregnant with her second child.

== Personal life ==
Grinham was born with a short left arm, no fingers and only half a thumb on her left hand. She was the first person with such a disability to attempt archery, so to avoid breaking the rule that the bow must not be attached to the archer, Grinham and her father Symon created a novel way of helping her grip her bow.

She was a student at BPP Law School in Waterloo, London.

== Career ==
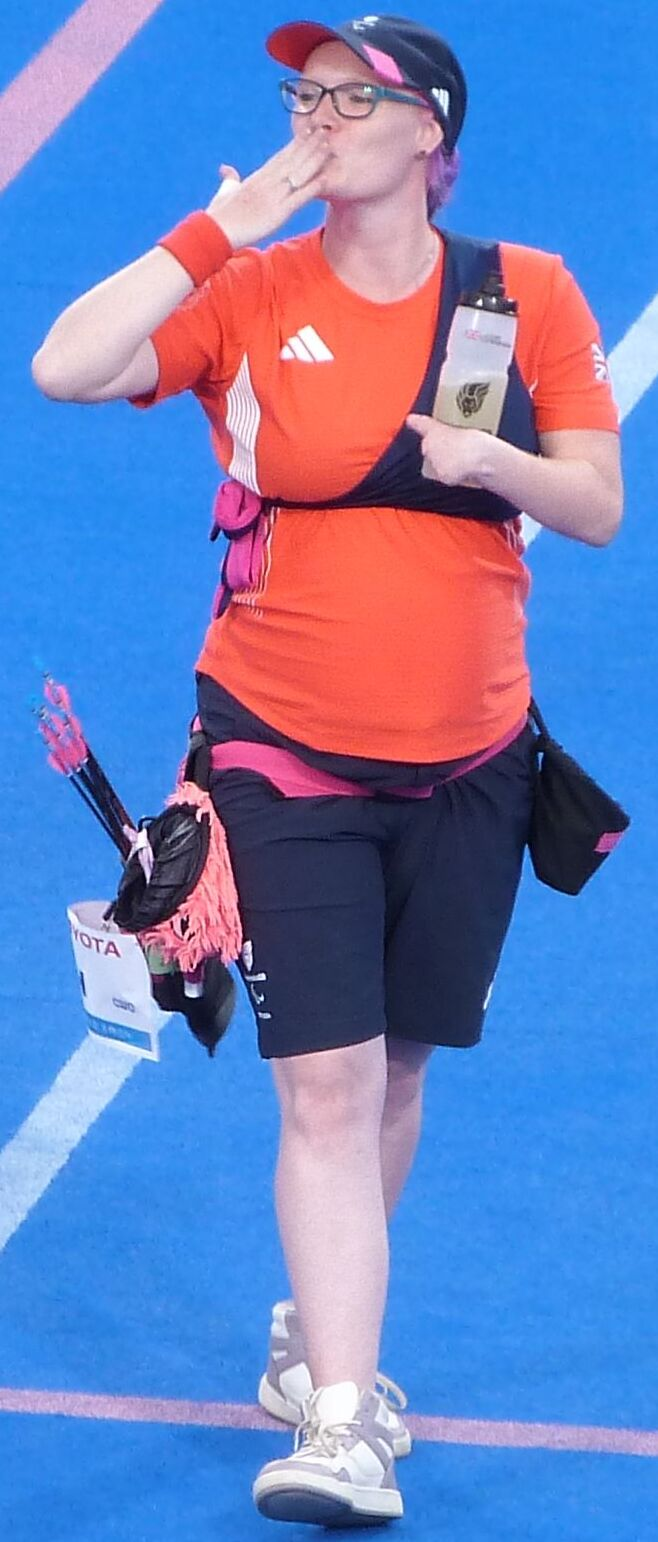
Grinham at the 2024 Summer Paralympics

Grinham first started archery in 2008. She was first selected for the Great Britain archery team in 2014, and finished seventh at the World Para-archery Championships in Germany in 2015.

=== 2016 Summer Paralympics ===
Grinham competed in the women's individual compound open and the team compound open events at the 2016 Summer Paralympics.

In the individual event, Grinham reached the quarter-finals, losing to Somayeh Abbaspour of Iran.

In the team event, Grinham partnered John Stubbs. The pair finished the preliminary ranking round seeded 5th of 10 teams with a score of 1,324. After defeating Italy in the quarterfinals and South Korea in semi-finals, Grinham and Stubbs faced China in the gold medal match, but were bested by the Chinese duo of Zhou Jiamin and Ai Xinliang 151-143. This was however enough to earn Grinham a silver medal.

=== 2024 Summer Paralympics ===
Grinham competed in the 2024 Summer Paralympics in Paris in the women's Individual Compound event and the Mixed Team Compound. She achieved a personal best in the individual compound open ranking round, shooting a score of 693 and winning the bronze medal. She also won gold in the mixed team compound alongside Nathan MacQueen.

Grinham was also the first-ever Paralympic athlete known to compete while pregnant, competing at seven-months pregnant.
