= Archery at the 2008 Summer Paralympics – Men's individual compound =

The Men's individual compound was one of the events held in archery at the 2008 Summer Paralympics in Beijing. There were two classes: a class for W1 wheelchair competitors and an open class. In the ranking round each archer shot 72 arrows; in the knockout stages the tally was reduced to 12 arrows each.

== W1 ==
Men's individual compound W1 at the XIII Paralympic Games
- Paralympic Archery
- Venue: Olympic Green Archery Field
- Dates: 9–14 September 2008
- Competitors: 12 from 9 nations

Medalists
1st place, gold medalist(s)		David Drahoninsky	Czech Republic
2nd place, silver medalist(s)		John Cavanagh	Great Britain
3rd place, bronze medalist(s)		Jeff Fabry	United States

The W1 class was won by David Drahoninsky, representing Czech Republic.

=== Ranking Round ===
Rank	Archer	Score	10's	X's	Notes
1	David Drahoninsky (CZE)	665	27	8	PR
2	Jeff Fabry (USA)	661	29	9	
3	John Cavanagh (GBR)	640	14	2	
4	Osmo Kinnunen (FIN)	627	17	6	
5	Norbert Murphy (CAN)	627	17	5	
6	An Seong-pyo (KOR)	619	13	4	
7	Olivier Hatem (FRA)	616	14	8	
8	Jean-Pierre Antonios (FIN)	606	11	2	
9	Robert Lehner (SUI)	603	10	5	
10	Fabio Luca Azzolini (ITA)	593	11	3	
11	Zdenek Sebek (CZE)	586	9	4	
12	Chuck Lear (USA)	577	14	1	

=== Competition bracket ===
Round of 16
Robert Lehner (SUI)	94
Jean-Pierre Antonios (FIN)	89
Norbert Murphy (CAN)	98
Chuck Lear (USA)	75
Zdenek Sebek (CZE)	100
An Seong Pyo (KOR)	104
Olivier Hatem (FRA)	101
Fabio Luca Azzolini (ITA)	107

Quarterfinals
David Drahoninsky (CZE)	106
Robert Lehner (SUI)	102
Norbert Murphy (CAN)	97
Osmo Kinnunen (FIN)	111
John Cavanagh (GBR)	106
An Seong Pyo (KOR)	104
Fabio Luca Azzolini (ITA)	97
Jeff Fabry (USA)	113

Semifinals
David Drahoninsky (CZE)	99
Osmo Kinnunen (FIN)	97
John Cavanagh (GBR)	109
Jeff Fabry (USA)	107

Final
David Drahoninsky (CZE)	108
John Cavanagh (GBR)	103
Third place
Osmo Kinnunen (FIN)	101
Jeff Fabry (USA)	111

== Open ==
Men's individual compound Open at the XIII Paralympic Games
- Paralympic Archery
- Venue: Olympic Green Archery Field
- Dates: 9–13 September
- Competitors: 20 from 14 nations

Medalists
1st place, gold medalist(s)		John Stubbs	Great Britain
2nd place, silver medalist(s)		Alberto Simonelli	Italy
3rd place, bronze medalist(s)		Philippe Horner	Switzerland

The Open class was won by John Stubbs, representing Great Britain.

=== Ranking Round ===
Rank	Archer	Score	10's	X's	Notes
1	John Stubbs (GBR)	691	46	20	WR
2	Lee Ouk-soo (KOR)	686	44	10	
3	Fred Stevens (GBR)	681	40	12	
4	Go Sung-kil (KOR)	680	38	11	
5	Philippe Horner (SUI)	679	36	15	
6	Joe Bailey (USA)	676	38	14	
7	Jiri Klich (CZE)	676	37	15	
8	Pavlo Nazar (UKR)	676	36	11	
9	Kevin Evans (CAN)	675	33	12	
10	Hakan Tornstrom (SWE)	675	32	9	
11	Keijo Kallunki (FIN)	675	31	15	
12	Maurice Champey (FRA)	674	33	12	
13	Michael Arenz (GER)	670	28	10	
14	T. J. Pemberton (USA)	668	29	7	
15	Alberto Simonelli (ITA)	667	34	16	
16	Eric Bennett (USA)	667	28	7	
17	Kweon Hyun-ju (KOR)	662	31	11	
18	Anders Gronberg (SWE)	657	32	7	
19	Tom Vangen (NOR)	654	27	10	
20	Sean Martin Heary (IRL)	652	18	1	

=== Competition bracket ===
Round of 32
Kweon Hyun Ju (KOR)	106
Eric Bennett * (USA)	106
Michael Arenz (GER)	104
Sean Martin Heary (IRL)	108
Tom Vangen (NOR)	103
T. J. Pemberton (USA)	106
Alberto Simonelli (ITA)	112
Anders Gronberg (SWE)	107

Round of 16
John Stubbs (GBR)	117
Eric Bennett (USA)	114
Kevin Evans (CAN)	110
Pavlo Nazar (UKR)	109
Philippe Horner (SUI)	113
Maurice Champey (FRA)	109
Sean Martin Heary (IRL)	113
Go Sung Kil (KOR)	112
Fred Stevens (GBR)	105
T. J. Pemberton (USA)	115
Keijo Kallunki (FIN)	110
Joe Bailey (USA)	115
Jiri Klich (CZE)	106
Hakan Tornstrom (SWE)	103
Alberto Simonelli (ITA)	115
Lee Ouk Soo (KOR)	112

Quarterfinals
John Stubbs (GBR)	111
Kevin Evans (CAN)	110
Philippe Horner (SUI)	113
Sean Martin Heary (IRL)	99
T. J. Pemberton (USA)	114
Joe Bailey (USA)	112
Jiri Klich (CZE)	110
Alberto Simonelli (ITA)	111

Semifinals
John Stubbs (GBR)	114
Philippe Horner (SUI)	109
T. J. Pemberton (USA)	110
Alberto Simonelli (ITA)	116

Final
John Stubbs (GBR)	116
Alberto Simonelli (ITA)	111
Third place
Philippe Horner (SUI)	115
T. J. Pemberton (USA)	111

* Decided by additional arrows: Kweon Hyun Ju shot 9, 8; Eric Bennett shot 9, 9.
