= Norbert Murphy =

Canadian archer (born 1956)

Personal information
- Born: January 29, 1956 (age 70) Vaudreuil-Dorion, Quebec, Canada

Sport
- Country: Canada
- Sport: Paralympic archery
- Event: Individual Compound W1
- Coached by: Vladimir Kopechy
Medal record
Paralympic Games
Archery
Bronze medal – third place	2012 London	Men's individual compound

Norbert Murphy (born 29 January 1956 in Vaudreuil-Dorion, Quebec) is a Canadian archer. He won a bronze medal at the 2012 Summer Paralympics in the Men's individual compound W1. He is currently 3rd in the world in the Men's Compound W1.

== His Disability ==
Murphy is in a wheelchair. W1 means athletes compete from a seated position and have an impairment that affects their arms, legs and trunk.

== Paralympics ==
He competed at the 2000 Summer Paralympics in Sydney, Australia, in the Men's Individual W2. He came 23rd in the ranking round so he did not advance to the 1/16 Final.

He also competed at the 2008 Summer Paralympics in Beijing, China in the Men's Individual Compound W1. He came 5th, so he advanced to the 1/8 Final. In the 1/8 final, he was against United States' Chuck Lear, whom he won 98-75. He then played against Finland's Osmo Kinnunen in the quarterfinals, who got a bye in the 1/8 round. He lost 97-111.

He also competed at the 2012 Summer Paralympics in London, United Kingdom in the Men's Individual Compound W1. He came 6th in the ranking round, advancing to the 1/8 round. In the 1/8 round, he competed against Japan's Shinichi Saito, which he won 6-2. In the quarterfinals, he was against Slovakia's Peter Kinik, which he won 6-0. In the semi-finals he was against United States' Jeff Fabry, who he lost 7-3. Fabry, the following day went on to win the gold medal. In the bronze medal match, he was against Czech Republic's David Drahoninsky. He won 7-1 and got the bronze medal. This was the first medal for Canada in archery in the Paralympics or Olympics.

== IPC Archery World Championships ==
Murphy has competed in all of the IPC World Championships from 1998 to 2009.

=== 1998 IPC World Archery Championships ===
He competed in the 1998 IPC World Archery Championships in Stoke Mandeville, United Kingdom in the Men's Recurve Bow W2. He came 23rd in the ranking round, advancing to the 1/16 round. In the 1/16 round, he competed against Finnish Pertii Pulkkinen, which he won 142-138. In the 1/8 of finals, he competed against Norwegian Rolf Edvardsen, which he won 142-122. In the 1/4 finals he was against Italian Giuseppe Gabelli, which he lost 98-101. Overall, he was 12th.

=== 1999 IPC World Archery Championships ===
He competed in the 1999 IPC World Archery Championships in Christchurch, New Zealand in the Men's Recurve Bow W2. He came 12th in the ranking round, advancing to the 1/16 round. In the 1/16 round, he competed against Israeli Amit Dror, which he won 134-133. In the 1/8 he was against French Charles Est which he lost 127-159. Overall, he was 16th.

=== 2001 IPC World Archery Championships ===
He competed in the 2001 IPC World Archery Championships in Nymburk, Czech Republic in the Men's Recurve Bow W2. He came 23rd in the ranking round, advancing to the 1/16 round. He was against Czech Jirí Klich, which he lost 140-140*. Overall, he was 25th.

=== 2003 IPC World Archery Championships ===
He competed in the 2003 IPC World Archery Championships in Madrid, Spain in the Men's Recurve Bow W2. He came 26th in the ranking round, advancing to the 1/32 round. In the 1/32 round he was against Hong Kong's Kong Sang Li which he won 136-106. In the 1/16 round, he competed against Ukrainian Roman Hutnyk, which he lost 131-143. Overall, he was 29th.

=== 2005 IPC World Archery Championships ===
He competed in the 2005 IPC World Archery Championships in Massa Carrara, Italy in the Men's Compound Bow W1. He came 6th in the ranking round, advancing to the 1/8 round. In the 1/8 round he was against Czech Martin Bartos, which he won 153-134. In the 1/4 round, he was against British John Cavanagh, which he lost 97-109. Overall, he was 8th.

=== 2007 IPC World Archery Championships ===
He competed in the 2007 IPC World Archery Championships in Cheongju, South Korea in the Men's Compound Bow W1. He came 4th in the ranking round, advancing to the 1/8 round. In the 1/8 round he was against Finnish Jean Pierre Antonios, which he won 108-100. In the 1/4 round he was against Czech David Drahoninsky, which he lost 105-110. Overall, he was 5th.

=== 2009 IPC World Archery Championships ===
He competed in the 2009 IPC World Archery Championships in Nymburk, Czech Republic in the Men's Compound Bow W1. He came 4th in the ranking round, advancing to the 1/4 round. In the 1/4 round he was against British John Cavanagh, which he won 107-104. In the semifinals, he was against Jeffrey Fabry, which he lost 102-109. In the bronze medal match he was against Italian Fabio Azzolini, which he won 104-103. Overall, he was 3rd.

=== 2014 Suspension ===
In 2014 World Archery, the international governing body for archery, brought down its decision regarding Norbert Murphy. The decision reads as follows: “That Mr. Norbert Murphy be prohibited from seeking a further classification until 23 June 2016, being a period of two years from the date upon which the athlete intentionally misrepresented skills and/or abilities”.

It was ruled that he broke the World Archery Rules in terms of classification at a world ranking para-archery tournament in Nove Mesto, Czech Republic in late June 2014. The matter was dealt with by the chief classifier on site at the tournament. Under Article 11.0 of the International Paralympic Committee (IPC) Classification Code and World Archery Article 1.14.1 it was up to the World Archery Board of Justice and Ethics to evaluate the case and decide if Mr. Murphy had broken the rules and establish the sanction. Articles 11.1 and 11.3 of the IPC Classification Code state: "An Athlete who, in the opinion of the Classification Panel, is intentionally misrepresenting skills and/or abilities shall be considered in violation of the Classification Rules. If the Athlete intentionally misrepresents skills and/or abilities, the Athlete will not be allocated a Sport Class or Sport Class Status, and will not be permitted to compete at that Competition in that Sport." For the full details on article 11.0 of the IPC Classification Code, go to:

Mr. Murphy has been deemed to be ineligible for classification as a result of his intentional misrepresentation of his physical strength, joint and muscle movement, and balance during the classification process. By deliberately "faking" his level of physical impairment, he sought to have himself classified in a class with the more severely impaired athletes and thus gain a competitive advantage. There is strong indisputable evidence of this misrepresentation based on what the trained Classifiers observed and their video footage of Mr. Murphy taken while he was on and off the field of play following the classification testing.

Archery Canada no longer recognized Mr. Murphy as a member-in-good standing. Therefore, his registration (membership) with Archery Canada and correspondingly with Archery Quebec is suspended for a two-year period retroactive from June 23, 2014 through to June 23, 2016. As a result, he lost all financial support available to Paralympic athletes.

The World Archery decision only applies forward from the date of the classification misrepresentation of June 23, 2014. Therefore, it has no impact on results achieved by Mr. Murphy prior to this date.
