= Archery at the 2004 Summer Paralympics – Men's team =

Men's Teams open at the XII Paralympic Games
- Paralympic Archery
- Venue: Olympic Baseball Centre (Athens)
- Dates: 26 September
- Competitors: 12

Medalists
1st place, gold medalist(s)		Jung Young Joo; Lee Hak Young; Lee Hong Gu	South Korea
2nd place, silver medalist(s)		Koichi Minami; Kimimasa Onodera; Shinji Sakodo	Japan
3rd place, bronze medalist(s)		Kevin Stone; Jeffrey Fabry; Aaron Cross	United States

The Men's Teams open archery competition at the 2004 Summer Paralympics was held on 26 September at the Olympic Baseball Centre (Athens).

The event was won by the team representing South Korea.

== Results ==
=== Ranking Round ===
Rank	Competitor	Points	Notes
1	South Korea	1885	WR
2	United States	1859	
3	Japan	1840	
4	Great Britain	1835	
5	Poland	1834	
6	Germany	1824	
7	France	1804	
8	Slovakia	1790	
9	Spain	1783	
10	Italy	1749	
11	Ukraine	1726	
12	Iran	1679	

=== Competition bracket ===
Round of 16
Spain	209
Slovakia^{[1]}	209
Poland	221
Iran	210
Ukraine	229
Germany	221
France	197
Italy^{[2]}	197

Quarterfinals
South Korea	217
Slovakia	213
Poland	209
Great Britain	221
Japan	226
Ukraine	206
Italy	223
United States	226

Semifinals
South Korea	236
Great Britain	231
Japan	215
United States	0^{[3]}

Final
South Korea	236
Japan	223
Third place
Great Britain	212
United States	231

^{[1]} Decided by additional arrows: 18:26
^{[2]} Decided by additional arrows: 22:25
^{[3]} Zero score recorded "For infringement of IPC rules"

== Team Lists ==
South Korea; Jung Young Joo; Lee Hak Young; Lee Hong Gu	United States; Kevin Stone; Jeffrey Fabry; Aaron Cross	Japan; Koichi Minami; Kimimasa Onodera; Shinji Sakodo	Great Britain; Alexander Gregory; John Cavanagh; Andrew Baylis
Poland; Ryszard Bukanski; Tomasz Lezanski; Piotr Sawicki	Germany; Eric Hassberg; Hermann Nortmann; Mario Oehme	France; Olivier Hatem; Eddy Gobbato; Stephane Gilbert	Slovakia; Jaroslav Lazo; Imrich Lyocsa; Vladimir Majercak
Spain; Manuel Candela; Jose Manuel Marin; Juan Miguel Zarzuela	Italy; Marco Vitale; Oscar de Pellegrin; Salvatore Carrubba	Ukraine; Serhiy Atamanenko; Roman Hutnyk; Yuriy Kopiy	Iran; Ghasem Javani Gorgabi; Heshmatollah Kazemi Rad; Majid Kehtari
