= Hancı =

Hancı is a Turkish-language occupational surname literally meaning "innkeeper" ("han keeper"), Notable people with the surname include:

- Abdurrahman Hancı (1923-2007), Turkish architect
- Doğan Hancı (born 1970), Turkish para-archer
- Gönül Hancı (born 1955), Turkish actress
- Münevver Hancı (born 2001), Turkish track and field athlete
