= Grinham =

Grinham is a surname. Notable people with the surname include:

- James Grinham (christened 20 December 1798-death unknown), English amateur cricketer
- Jodie Grinham (born 1993), British archer
- Judy Grinham (born 1939), British competitive swimmer
- Natalie Grinham (born 1978), Australian squash player
- Rachael Grinham (born 1977), Australian squash player
