= Powerlifting at the 2016 Summer Paralympics – Men's 107 kg =

Powerlifting – Men's 107 kg at the XV Paralympic Games
- Venue: Riocentro
- Date: 14 September 2016
- Competitors: 10 from 10 nations
- Winning lift: 238.0 kg PR

Medalists
1st place, gold medalist(s)		Pavlos Mamalos	Greece
2nd place, silver medalist(s)		Mohamed Ahmed	Egypt
3rd place, bronze medalist(s)		Ali Sadeghzadeh	Iran

The men's 107 kg powerlifting event at the 2016 Summer Paralympics was contested on 14 September at Riocentro.

== Records ==
There are twenty powerlifting events, corresponding to ten weight classes each for men and women. The weight categories were significantly adjusted after the 2012 Games so most of the weights are new for 2016. As a result, no Paralympic record was available for this weight class prior to the competition. The existing world records were as follows.

Record Type	Weight	Country	Venue	Date
World record	243 kg	Elshan Huseynov (AZE)	Eger	27 November 2015
Paralympic record	–	–	–	–

== Results ==
Rank	Name	Body weight (kg)	Attempts (kg)				Result (kg)
Rank	Name	Body weight (kg)	1	2	3	4	Result (kg)
1st place, gold medalist(s)	Pavlos Mamalos (GRE)	104.8	233.0	234.0	238.0 PR	~~243.5~~	238.0
2nd place, silver medalist(s)	Mohamed Ahmed (EGY)	101.73	225.0	~~233.0~~	233.0	–	233.0
3rd place, bronze medalist(s)	Ali Sadeghzadeh (IRI)	105.8	226.0	~~234.0~~	~~234.0~~	–	226.0
4	Cai Huichao (CHN)	97.26	210.0	215.0	~~226.0~~	–	215.0
5	Haidarah Abdallah Hasan Alkawamleh (JOR)	103.27	192.0	200.0	204.0	–	204.0
6	Zhyrgalbek Orosbaev (KGZ)	105.37	203.0	~~211.0~~	~~211.0~~	–	205.0
7	Nuriddin Davlatov (UZB)	99.54	195.0	200.0	~~210.0~~	–	200.0
8	Md Saad Mohd Shahmil (MAS)	104.16	~~190.0~~	192.0	196.0	–	196.0
9	Ruben Soroseb (NAM)	103.44	~~190.0~~	190.0	~~200.0~~	–	190.0
-	Elshan Huseynov (AZE)	102.9	~~232.0~~	~~232.0~~	~~232.0~~	–	NMR
