= Powerlifting at the 2004 Summer Paralympics – Men's 90 kg =

2004 paralympics event

Men's Up To 90 kg at the XII Paralympic Games
- Paralympic Powerlifting
- Venue: Nikaia Olympic Weightlifting Hall
- Dates: 26 September 2004
- Competitors: 14 from 13 nations
- Winning weight(kg): 240.0

Medalists
1st place, gold medalist(s)		Park Jong Chul	South Korea
2nd place, silver medalist(s)		Ryszard Rogala	Poland
3rd place, bronze medalist(s)		Wu Ya Dong	China

The Men's 90 kg powerlifting event at the 2004 Summer Paralympics was competed on 26 September. It was won by Park Jong Chul, representing South Korea.

== Final round ==
26 Sept. 2004, 17:15

Rank	Athlete	Weight(kg)	Notes
1st place, gold medalist(s)	Park Jong Chul (KOR)	240.0	PR
2nd place, silver medalist(s)	Ryszard Rogala (POL)	220.0	
3rd place, bronze medalist(s)	Wu Ya Dong (CHN)	217.5	
4	Abd Elmonem Farag (EGY)	215.0	
5	Bernd Vogel (GER)	212.5	
6	Pavlos Mamalos (GRE)	207.5	
7	Coetzee Wium (RSA)	190.0	
8	Frank Gyland (NOR)	187.5	
9	Sandor Sas (HUN)	182.5	
10	Steve Green (AUS)	175.0	
11	Jose Chirinos (VEN)	170.0	
12	Abdulmonem Al Najar (KSA)	165.0	
13	Vasileios Giannoukas (GRE)	150.0	
14	Peter Stefanides (SVK)	142.5	
