= Mohamed Ahmed (powerlifter) =

Egyptian paralympic powerlifter

Sport
- Country: Egypt
- Sport: Powerlifting
Medal record
Representing Egypt
Paralympic Games
Powerlifting
Silver medal – second place	2016 Rio de Janeiro	Men's 107 kg

Mohamed Ahmed is an Egyptian paralympic powerlifter. He competed at the 2016 Summer Paralympics in the powerlifting competition, winning the silver medal in the men's 107 kg event.
