= Ryszard Rogala =

Polish Paralympic powerlifter

Personal information
- Born: 11 March 1975 (age 51) Sierakow, Poland

Sport
- Country: Poland
- Sport: Paralympic powerlifting
Medal record
Paralympic powerlifting
Representing Poland
Paralympic Games
Silver medal – second place	2004 Athens	Men's -90kg
Bronze medal – third place	2008 Beijing	Men's -90kg
World Championships
Bronze medal – third place	2002 Kuala Lumpur	Men's -90kg
Bronze medal – third place	2006 Busan	Men's -90kg

Ryszard Rogala (born 11 March 1975) is a Paralympic powerlifter of Poland. He began competing in Poland in 1999. He has won Paralympic medals for his nation.

He lost both his legs in 1995 after he fell under a train. He is now a county councillor in his hometown.
