= Kim Mi-soon =

South Korean Paralympic archer

Personal information
- Nationality: South Korean

Sport
- Country: South Korea
- Sport: Archery
Medal record
Representing South Korea
Paralympic Games
Bronze medal – third place	2016 Rio	Women's individual compound open
Bronze medal – third place	2016 Rio	Team compound open
World Para Archery Championship
Gold medal – first place	2015 Donaueslign	Individual compound open event

Kim Mi-soon (Korean: 김미순) is a South Korean Paralympic archer.

Kim is from Andong, South Korea. She began archery in 2010 and made her international debut in 2014.

She competed at the 2016 Summer Paralympics where she won bronze medals in the Women's individual compound open and Team compound open events.

She also won a gold medal at the 2015 World Para Archery Championship in the individual compound open event.
