= Pavlos Mamalos =

Greek Paralympic powerlifter

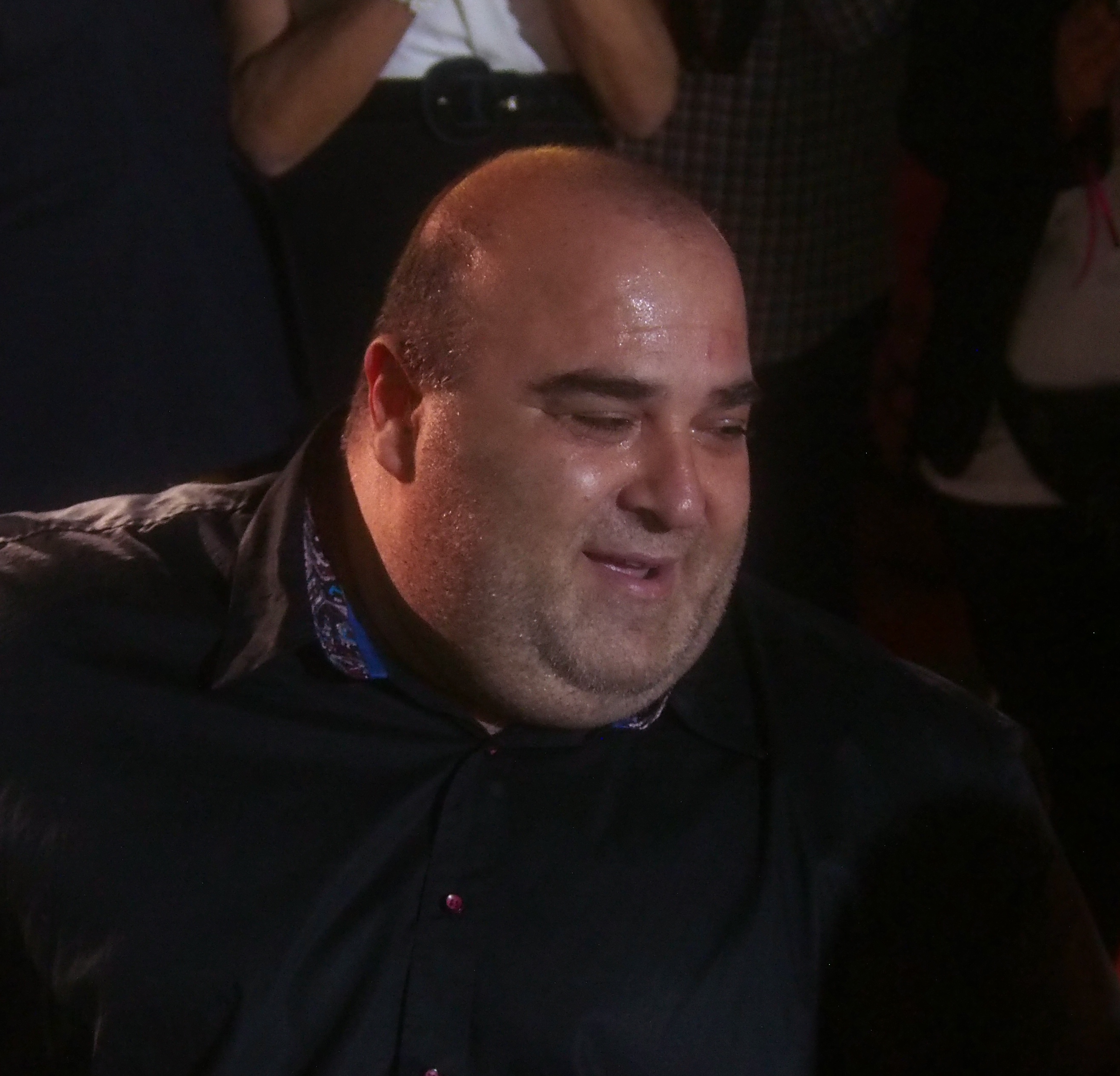

Personal information
- Nationality: Greek
- Born: 8 February 1971 (age 55) Aspropyrgos, Greece

Sport
- Country: Greece
- Sport: Paralympic powerlifting
Medal record
Representing Greece
Paralympic Games
Gold medal – first place	2016 Rio de Janeiro	Men's 107 kg
Silver medal – second place	2008 Beijing	Men's 82.5 kg
Bronze medal – third place	2012 London	Men's 90 kg

Pavlos Mamalos (born February 8, 1971) is a Greek paralympic athlete in powerlifting, a Paralympic gold medalist and World Championships silver medalist. He was awarded as the Best Greek male athlete with a disability for 2016.

Mamalos has participated in four consecutive Summer Paralympics. He was first in the Rio de Janeiro 2016 Paralympics in Men's 107 kg, silver medalist in the 2008 Paralympics in Men's 82.5 kg and bronze medalist in the 2012 Summer Paralympics in Men's 90 kg. In his first Paralympic Games (Athens, 2004) he took the sixth place in Men's 90 kg.

== See also ==
- Greece at the 2016 Summer Paralympics
