= Michael Hall (archer) =

British Paralympic archer (born 1975)

Personal information
- Nationality: British
- Born: 20 July 1975 (age 50) Liverpool, England

Sport
- Sport: Archery
- Event: Compound
- Coached by: Michael Peart
Medal record
Representing Great Britain
Dutch Para Archery Tournament
Gold medal – first place	2015 Almere	Men's compound open
Bronze medal – third place	2015 Almere	Men's compound open (team)

Michael Hall (born 20 July 1975) is a British Paralympic archer.

He has competed at the Summer Paralympics, World Para Archery Championships and the Para Continental Championships.
