= Jeff Fabry =

American Paralympic archer

- Coast Guard Lt. Sancho Johnson (left) and Jeff Fabry (right)

Personal information
- Full name: Jeffrey Fabry
- Born: April 14, 1973 (age 53) Hanford, California, U.S.
- Home town: Lemore, California, U.S.
Medal record
Men's para archery
Representing United States
Paralympic Games
| Gold medal – first place | 2012 London | Individual compound W1 |
| Bronze medal – third place | 2004 Athens | Men's Individual W1 |
| Bronze medal – third place | 2004 Athens | Men's teams open |
| Bronze medal – third place | 2008 Beijing | Individual compound W1 |

Jeffrey Fabry (born April 14, 1973, in Hanford, California) is an American amputee and Paralympic archer. He won bronze medals at the 2004 Summer Paralympics and the 2008 Summer Paralympics, and a gold medal at the United States at the 2012 Summer Paralympics.

He became disabled after he lost most of his right arm and right leg in a motorcycle accident when he was 15. He credits his wife, Crystal for getting him into the sport. He is also the father of two children: Rebecca & Joseph.
