= Philippe Horner =

Swiss Paralympic archer

Medal record

Archery

Representing Switzerland

Paralympic Games
Bronze medal – third place	2008 Beijing	Men's individual compound - Open

Philippe Horner is a Swiss paralympic archer. He won the bronze medal at the Men's individual compound - Open event at the 2008 Summer Paralympics in Beijing.
