= Doğan Hancı =

Turkish Paralympic archer (born 1970)

Personal information
- Nationality: Turkish
- Born: 30 September 1970 (age 56) Erzurum, Turkey

Sport
- Country: Turkey
- Sport: Paralympic archery
- Event: Men's individual compound ARW2
- Club: Erzurum Okçuluk İhtisas Spor Kulübü
- Coached by: Hikmet Dumanoğlu

Achievements and titles
- Paralympic finals: 2012
Medal record
Men's archery
Representing Turkey
Paralympic Games
Bronze medal – third place	2012 London	ind comp open
- Updated on 3 September 2012

Doğan Hancı (born 30 September 1970 in Erzurum, Turkey), is a Turkish para-archer of wheelchair class ARW2.

He became paralyzed as a result of a wrong injection.

He represented Turkey at the 2012 Summer Paralympics in the category of individual compound open and won the bronze medal scoring 671 points.
