= Lucia Kupczyk =

German Paralympic archer

Personal information
- Born: 30 November 1962 (age 63) Frankfurt, Germany

Sport
- Country: Germany
- Sport: Para archery
- Club: BS Laichinger
Medal record
Para archery
Representing Germany
World Championships
Silver medal – second place	2015 Donaueschingen	Team compound
European Championships
Gold medal – first place	2014 Nottwil	Team compound open
Gold medal – first place	2016 Saint-Jean-de-Monts	Team compound open

Lucia Kupczyk (born 30 November 1962) is a German Paralympic archer who competes in international archery competitions. She is a World silver medalist and a two-time European champion and has competed at the 2016 Summer Paralympics where she reached the round of 16 in the individual compound.
