= María Carmen Rubio =

Spanish Paralympic archer

María Rubio
Personal information
- Full name: María Carmen Rubio Larrion
- Nationality: Spanish
- Born: 17 September 1961 (age 64) Pamplona, Navarra, Spain

Sport
- Country: Spain
- Sport: Archery

María Carmen Rubio Larrion (Note: In this Spanish name, the first or paternal surname is Rubio and the second or maternal family name is Larrion.) (born 17 September 1961) is an archer from Spain. She has represented Spain in archery at the 2012 Summer Paralympics in London, and at the World Championships, where she finished sixth in the women's individual compound event in 2013. She has also represented Spain at European Championships.

== Personal ==
Rubio was born in Pamplona, Navarra on 17 September 1961. She continued to reside in the region in 2013.

== Archery ==
Rubio received a scholarship from fellow countryman and multiple Tour de France winner Miguel Induráin, enabling her to compete.

Rubio competed at the 2006 European Championship in Nymburk, Czech Republic where she finished first. In April 2008, she was one of four Navarre women on the short list to attend the Beijing Paralympics. She competed at the Italian hosted 2011 World Championships where she had a fourth and fifth place finish. In 2010, she competed at the Spanish Archery Championship for Physically Handicapped, where she earned a gold medal in the women's recurve event. In August 2010, she participated in the Vichy, France hosted European adaptive archery championships where she finished fifth in the women's team event after failing to qualify for the semi-finals. Her teammate for the event was Ainara Badiola.

Vitoria-Gasteiz hosted the Spanish adaptive archery national indoor championships in February 2011, with Rubio finishing second in the women's compound event. In April 2011, he participated in a Spanish adaptive archery competition. She competed in the first place finals, defeating Badiola in a tiebreaker arrow. Ibiza hosted the June 2011 Spanish adaptive championships, where she met Badiola in the gold medal match. The World Championships were held in July 2011, where Rubio finished fifth in the women's open compound event, sixth in the women's team compound event, and seventh in the mixed compound team event.

The London qualifying competition, the British Open, was held August 2011 in Heathrow at Stoke Mandeville, with Rudio competing to try to earn Spain one of the twenty qualifying sports on offer. There was no funding for her and other Spanish archers to compete at the London hosted event because Spanish Sports Federation for Persons with Physical Disabilities refused to prioritize the sport after poor performances by Spanish archers at the previous world championships held in Turin. Funding to attend instead came from regional sports federations. On the first qualifying day of competition, there was winds up to 40 kilometers an hour. That day, she scored a 642. Her earlier performance in the ranking round where she finished eighth meant she did not have to participate in the first qualifying round. She finished in third place. Spain had a qualifying competition to determine who would represent the country at the 2012 Games. Participating at the March 2012 qualifying event, she met the minimum IPC qualifying score of 650 with two scores of 651 and 653 in the women's open test compound bow.

Club Arquero Chiclana organized the 2012 Spanish national championships in June 2012. There, Rubio finished first in the women's open compound event.

Rubio competed in archery at the 2012 Summer Paralympics, finishing 6th in the individual compound bow after reaching the quarter final round, where she lost to Danielle Brown. Brown was top seeded after the qualifying round and Rubio was the bottom seed. The London Games were her first. Going into the Games, her goal was to finish in the top 12. At the conclusion of her competitive archery at the Games, she saw London with her family.

Following the merger of the Spanish archery federations for archers with disabilities and those without, a combined national championship was held in February 2013. Rubio was one of ten archers with disabilities to take part, and the only woman with a disability to participate in the compound event. A score 549 points in the individual compound bow put her in eleventh position, and was not enough to qualify her for the next round. In Bangkok in November 2013, she competed in the IPC World Archery Championships. She earned selection to compete in Bangkok following a qualifying event in Spain. She finished seventh overall in the first qualifying round, before going on to finish sixth overall. In the team competition, where she shot with Guillermo Rodríguez, the pair first met the team from Thailand. In July 2013, she was one of 306 from Navarre named as a "Deportistas de élite", a category of Spanish elite sportspeople that provides a number of benefits.
