= Guillermo Rodríguez (archer) =

Spanish Paralympic athlete

Personal information
- Full name: Guillermo Javier Rodríguez González
- Nationality: Spanish
- Born: 7 February 1960 (age 66) Naron, A Coruña

Sport
- Country: Spain
- Sport: Archery

Guillermo Javier Rodríguez González (born 7 February 1960) is an adaptive archer from Spain. He won a gold medal at the Spanish Archery Championship for the Physically Handicapped in 2010. Gonzalez represented Spain at the 2012 Summer Paralympics and the 2013 IPC World Championships. He shoots both the recurve and compound bows. He finished just out of the medals at the London Paralympics.

== Personal ==
Guillermo was born on 7 February 1960 in Naron, A Coruña. He is from Galicia, and nicknamed Willy. He lost partial use of his legs following a traffic accident.

== Archery ==
Rodríguez took up the sport in 2005, is an ARST classified archer, and is a member of two archery clubs, ADM Ferrol and Arco Ferrol.

In 2010, Rodríguez competed at the Spanish Archery Championship for the Physically Handicapped, earning a gold medal in the men's recurve event. In August 2010, he participated in the Vichy, France-hosted European adaptive archery championships, where he finished fifth after losing 5–4 to British archer John Stubbs in the semi-finals.

The London qualifying competition was held in August 2011 in London at Stoke Mandeville, with Rodríguez competing to try to earn Spain one of the twenty qualifying spots on offer. There was no funding for him and other Spanish archers to compete at the London-hosted event because Federación Española de persones con Discapacitad Física refused to prioritize the sport after poor performances by Spanish archers at the previous world championships held in Turin. Funding to attend instead came from regional sports federations. The 9th Toralín Ponferrada Archery Challenge was held in December 2011. It was an indoor shooting event, with adaptive archers competing against able-bodied archers. Rodríguez finished third in the senior men's compound event. Spain had a qualifying competition to determine who would represent the country at the 2012 Games. Participating in the March 2012 qualifying event, he scored 680 and 681.

The 21st edition of the Trofeo Sílex archery competition was held in June 2012. Representing the Ferrol archery club, he finished first in the senior men's compound bow event. Club Arquero Chiclana organized the 2012 Spanish national championships in June 2012. There, Rodríguez finished first in the men's open compound event.

Coached by national team coach Irene Cuesta, Rodríguez competed in archery at the 2012 Summer Paralympics, finishing fourth in the compound bow event. After qualifying for the semi-finals, he had to face American Matt Sutzman. The London heat caused issues with Rodríguez's bow, resulting in shots going "eight to the left". Losing the match, he then met Turkish archer Hanci Dogar in the bronze medal match that he lost. Rodríguez blamed not gaining a medal on the weather and temperature that affected his aluminium bow. His fourth-place finish was the best of all Spanish archers at the 2012 Paralympic Games. Later, upon returning home from London, he was congratulated by Ferrol mayor José Manuel Rey, and the Councillor for Sports Susana Martinez Galdos at a ceremony at Ferrol's townhall.

The X Toralin Archery Challenge and III Botillo Trophy took place in November 2012, with Rodríguez participating. Following the merger of the Spanish archery federations for archers with disabilities and those without, a combined national championship was held in February 2013. Rodríguez was one of ten archers with disabilities to take part. A score 571 points in the individual compound bow put him in 23 position, and qualified him for the team event representing Galacia. His team went on to finish in fourth place. In Bangkok in November 2013, he competed in the IPC World Archery Championships. He earned selection to compete in Bangkok following a qualifying event in Spain. He qualified through to the first qualifying round. He finished with a combined score of 679 in qualifying, which placed in eighth overall out of sixty total competitors in his classification. The high placing meant he was put directly into the round of 32, which was a head-to-head shooting category. There he met British shooter Maguire. While ranked above him, Rodríguez lost by one point and did not advance further. In the team competition, where he shot with María Carmen Rubio, the pair first met the team from Thailand.
