= Zhou Jiamin =

Chinese Paralympic archer (born 1990)

Personal information
- Born: 9 February 1990 (age 36) Zhejiang, China

Sport
- Sport: Archery
- Club: Shau Shufen
Medal record
Archery
Representing China
Paralympic Games
Gold medal – first place	2016 Rio de Janeiro	Individual compound open
Gold medal – first place	2016 Rio de Janeiro	Team compound open
Asian Para Games
Gold medal – first place	2018 Jakarta	Team compound open
Bronze medal – third place	2018 Jakarta	Individual compound open

Zhou Jiamin (Chinese: 周佳敏; pinyin: Zhōu Jiāmǐn; born 9 February 1990) is a Chinese Paralympic archer.

In the 2016 Summer Paralympics, her debut games, Zhou won two gold medals.

Paralympics
Preceded by Rong Jing	Flagbearer for China (with Wang Hao) (Japan) Tokyo 2020	Succeeded by Incumbent
