= Aaron Cross =

American quadriplegic archer (born 1975)

Personal information
- Born: June 28, 1975 (age 51) Waterloo, Iowa, U.S.

Sport
- Sport: Para archery
- Disability: Tetraplegia
Medal record
Representing United States
Paralympics
Bronze medal – third place	2004 Athens	Men's team

Aaron Cross (born June 28, 1975, Waterloo, Iowa) is a quadriplegic American archer.

== Education and sport ==
He graduated from Augsburg College in 1997. He is currently working on his Masters in Vocational Rehabilitation Counseling at Saint Cloud State University.

Cross was paralyzed in an accident while training for the Olympics.

He competed in the 1996 Summer Paralympics, taking fourth place, and in the 2000 Summer Paralympics, taking fifth place. He went on to compete in the 2002 Wheel-chair Archery World Championships in Nymburk. He won bronze in the Men's team event in archery at the 2004 Summer Paralympics.

As a member of the U.S. World Archery Team, he won a Team Silver 2002, a Bronze in 1994, and a Gold in 1993.

Cross has been featured in nationally syndicated magazines such as, Sport' N Spokes, Paraplegic News, Target and Spirit Magazine along with being featured on local, regional and national print and electronic media such as ABC and NBC.

In 2005, he was the first wheelchair user to attempt and finish a Navy SEAL (SAC) training course. He completed the course a second time in 2009.

- SCSU advance delegation to assess accessibility for Beijing, China
- U.S. Team Captain for the 2000 and 2004 Paralympic Archery Team
- Team Bronze 2004 Paralympic Medal Winner — archery
- Athlete Representative to the U.S. Olympic Committee for archery, 1996-2003
- Paralympic Committee (USOC, USPC) for archery, 2000–02
- Governor to the Minnesota State Archery Association, 2000–02
- Target VP to the Minnesota State Archery Association, 2002–04
- President of the St. Cloud Archery Association, 2000-2004
- Technical Delegate to International Paralympic Committee, 1996-2000

== Awards ==
- Safari Club International Pathfinder Award, 2013
- Judd Jacobson Award for Success in Community and Professional, 2011
- Augsburg College Decade Award for Excellence in Profession and Community, 2005
- Toastmasters International of District Six, Speaker of the Year for Communication and Leadership in Community, State and Profession 2000
- Augsburg College, Key Maker Award Recognition for Academic Achievement, Personal Growth, in College and Career 1997
- Technical High School Commencement Speaker, St. Cloud, MN, 1993
