= Alberto Simonelli =

Italian Paralympic archer

Medal record

Archery

Representing Italy

Paralympic Games
Silver medal – second place	2008 Beijing	Individual compound - Open
Silver medal – second place	2016 Rio	Individual compound - Open

World Championships
Silver medal – second place	2017 Mexico	Team

Alberto Simonelli is an Italian paralympic archer. He won the silver medal at the Men's individual compound - Open event at the 2008 Summer Paralympics in Beijing.

== See also ==
- Italy at the 2008 Summer Paralympics
- Italy at the 2016 Summer Paralympics
