= Ai Xinliang =

Chinese Paralympic archer (born 1997)

Personal information
- Born: 19 May 1997 (age 29)

Sport
- Country: China
- Sport: Paralympic archery
Medal record
Men's compound para-archery
Paralympic Games
Gold medal – first place	2016 Rio de Janeiro	Mixed team
Silver medal – second place	2024 Paris	Individual
Bronze medal – third place	2020 Tokyo	Individual
World Para Archery Championship
Gold medal – first place	2017 Beijing	Individual
Gold medal – first place	2019 's-Hertogenbosch	Mixed team
Gold medal – first place	2023 Plzeň	Doubles
Bronze medal – third place	2019 's-Hertogenbosch	Men's team
Bronze medal – third place	2023 Plzeň	Mixed team
Asian Para Games
Gold medal – first place	2018 Indonesia	Individual
Gold medal – first place	2018 Indonesia	Mixed team
Gold medal – first place	2022 Hangzhou	Doubles
Silver medal – second place	2022 Hangzhou	Mixed team

Ai Xinliang (born 19 May 1997) is a Chinese Paralympic archer.

== Career ==
Ai won the gold medal in the team compound open event at the 2016 Summer Paralympics held in Rio de Janeiro, Brazil. In 2021, he won the bronze medal in the men's individual compound open event at the 2020 Summer Paralympics held in Tokyo, Japan.

He won silver in the men's individual compound open event at the 2024 Summer Paralympics in Paris, France, losing a shoot-off to Matt Stutzman from the United States.
