= John Stubbs (archer) =

English archer (born 1965)

Medal record

Archery

Representing United Kingdom

Paralympic Games
Gold medal – first place	2008 Beijing	Men's individual compound
Silver medal – second place	2016 Rio de Janeiro	Team compound open

John Stephen Stubbs MBE (born 12 July 1965) is an English competitive archer. Stubbs has competed in four Summer Paralympic Games, winning gold in the men's individual compound at the 2008 Games and silver in the team compound open at the 2016 Games.

== Achievements ==
2003
(silver) IPC World Archery Championships, team, Madrid
2005
(gold) IPC World Archery Championships, individual, Massa Carrara
(silver) IPC World Archery Championships, team, Massa Carrara
2008
(gold) World Invitational Disabled Competition, individual, Stoke Mandeville
(gold) Summer Paralympics, individual, Beijing
2009
(gold) European Archery Disabled Invitational Tournament, Stoke Mandeville
(silver) IPC World Championships, Men's team, Nymburk
2010
(bronze) Arizona Cup, individual, Phoenix, Arizona
(bronze) European Para Championships, individual, Vichy
2011
(silver) IPC World Championships, individual, Turin
2013
(gold) World Archery Para Championships, individual, Bangkok
(gold) World Archery Para Championships, team, Bangkok
(silver) World Archery Para Championships, mixed team, Bangkok
2014
(bronze) First Asian Grand Prix, mixed team, Bangkok
(bronze) European Para-Archery Championships, individual, Nottwil
(bronze) European Para Archery Championships, mixed team, Nottwil
2016
(silver) Summer Paralympics, mixed team, Rio de Janeiro
