= Zdeněk Šebek =

Czech Paralympic archer (born 1959)

Personal information
- Nationality: Czech
- Born: 14 November 1959 (age 67) Ústí nad Orlicí, Czechoslovakia

Sport
- Sport: Archery; Track and field
Medal record
Men's archery
Representing Czech Republic
Paralympic Games
Gold medal – first place	2000 Sydney	Individual W1

Zdeněk Šebek (born 14 November 1959) is a Czech Paralympic archer and former track and field athlete.

He competed at the 1992 and 1996 Summer Paralympics as a track and field athlete competing in the javelin throw, discus throw and shot put. He also competed in the wheelchair sprints at the 1992 Summer Paralympics where he did not advance into the finals.

For the 2000 Paralympics, he switched from track and field athletics to archery, and had a successful debut in this sport by winning the gold medal in the Men's Individual W1. He has also competed in archery at the 2004 and 2008 Paralympics. At the 2007 wheelchair World Archery Championships, Šebek won gold as part of the Czech Republic team. This was his fourth career gold medal at the World Championships.
