= Somayeh Abbaspour =

Iranian Paralympic archer (born 1985)

Personal information
- Born: 7 September 1985 (age 40) Birjand, Iran

Sport
- Sport: Archery
- Event: Compound
Medal record
Representing Iran
Asian Para Games
Silver medal – second place	2018 Jakarta	Team compound open
Asian Para Archery Championships
Silver medal – second place	2015 Bangkok	Women's individual compound open
Silver medal – second place	2015 Bangkok	Mixed team compound open

Somayeh Abbaspour (born 7 September 1985) is an Iranian Paralympic archer.

Abbaspour has competed once at the Summer Paralympics, three times at the World Para Archery Championships and once at the Para Continental Championships.
