= John Cavanagh (archer) =

British Paralympic archer (born 1956)

Personal information
- Born: 21 July 1956 (age 69) London, England
Medal record
Men's archery
Representing Great Britain
Paralympic Games
Gold medal – first place	2004 Athens	Individual W1
Silver medal – second place	2008 Beijing	Individual compound W1

John Cavanagh (born 21 July 1956 in London) is a disabled British archer. He won gold at the men's W1 individual compound of the 2004 Summer Paralympics and silver at the men's W1 individual compound of the 2008 Summer Paralympics.
