= Olivier Hatem =

French Paralympic archer (born 1973)

Personal information
- Nationality: French
- Born: 16 January 1973 (age 53) La Tronche, France
Medal record
Men's para archery
Representing France
Paralympic Games
Silver medal – second place	2000 Sydney	Individual W1
Silver medal – second place	2000 Sydney	Teams Open

Olivier Hatem (born 16 January 1973) is a French Paralympic archer from La Tronche, France.

In archery at the 2000 Summer Paralympics, he won two silver medals. He also competed in the 2004, 2008, and 2016 Summer Paralympics.
