= Turkey at the 2024 Summer Paralympics =

- Flag of Turkey
- IPC code: TUR
- NPC: Turkish Paralympic Committee

in Paris, France August 28, 2024 – September 8, 2024
- Competitors: 94 in 15 sports
- Flag bearers: Mahmut Bozteke; Sevilay Öztürk
- Medals Ranked 23rd: Gold 6 Silver 10 Bronze 12 Total 28

Summer Paralympics appearances (overview)
- 1992; 1996; 2000; 2004; 2008; 2012; 2016; 2020; 2024

Turkey, officially named Türkiye by the IPC competed at the 2024 Summer Paralympics in Paris, France, from 28 August to 8 September 2024. This was the country's eighth appearance.

== Medalists ==
Medal	Name	Sport	Event	Date
Gold	Mahmut Bozteke	Taekwondo	Men's 63 kg	30 August
Gold	Öznur Cüre	Archery	Women's individual compound open	31 August
Gold	Turkey women's national goalball team: Fatma Gül Güler; Reyhan Yılmaz; Sevda Altınoluk; Şeydanur Kaplan; Berfin Altan; Sevtap Altunoluk	Goalball	Women's tournament	5 September
Gold	Umut Ünlü	Swimming	Men's 50 m freestyle S3	6 September
Gold	İbrahim Bölükbaşı	Judo	Men's +90 kg J2	7 September
Gold	Umut Ünlü	Swimming	Men's 200 m freestyle S3	7 September
Silver	Ali Can Özcan	Taekwondo	Men's 58 kg	29 August
Silver	Gamze Gürdal	Taekwondo	Women's 57 kg	30 August
Silver	Fatih Çelik	Taekwondo	Men's 70 kg	30 August
Silver	Aysel Özgan	Shooting	Women's 10 metre air pistol SH1	31 August
Silver	Mohammad Khalvandi	Athletics	Men's javelin throw	31 August
Silver	Aysel Önder	Athletics	Women's 400 m T20	3 September
Silver	Abdullah Kayapınar	Powerlifting	Men's −49 kg	4 September
Silver	Besra Duman	Powerlifting	Women's −55 kg	5 September
Silver	Sadık Savaş; Merve Nur Eroğlu	Archery	Mixed Team Recurve	5 September
Silver	Kübra Korkut	Table tennis	Women's Individual C7	5 September
Bronze	Meryem Betül Çavdar	Taekwondo	Women's 52 kg	29 August
Bronze	Abdullah Öztürk; Nesim Turan	Table tennis	Men's doubles MD8	30 August
Bronze	Ali Öztürk	Table tennis	Men's Individual C5	3 September
Bronze	Nazmiye Muratlı	Powerlifting	Women's −45 kg	4 September
Bronze	Ebru Acer	Table tennis	Women's Individual C11	5 September
Bronze	Ecem Taşın	Judo	Women's 48 kg J1	5 September
Bronze	Cahide Eke	Judo	Women's 48 kg J2	5 September
Bronze	Sevilay Öztürk	Swimming	Women's 50 m butterfly S5	6 September
Bronze	Hakan Akkaya	Wheelchair fencing	Men's épée A	6 September
Bronze	Fatma Damla Altın	Athletics	Women's Long Jump T20	6 September
Bronze	Sibel Çam	Powerlifting	Women's −73 kg	7 September
Bronze	Nazan Akın Güneş	Judo	Women's +70 kg J1	7 September

=== Disqualified Medalists ===
Medal	Name	Sport	Event	Date
Gold	Serkan Yıldırım	Athletics	Men's 100 metres T12	31 August 2024

=== Medals by Sport ===
Medals by sport
Sport	1st place, gold medalist(s)	2nd place, silver medalist(s)	3rd place, bronze medalist(s)	Total
Swimming	2	0	1	3
Taekwondo	1	3	1	5
Archery	1	1	0	2
Judo	1	0	3	4
Goalball	1	0	0	1
Powerlifting	0	2	2	4
Athletics	0	2	1	3
Table tennis	0	1	3	4
Shooting	0	1	0	1
Wheelchair fencing	0	0	1	1
Total	6	10	12	28

=== Multiple Medalists ===
Multiple medalists
Name	Sport	1st place, gold medalist(s)	2nd place, silver medalist(s)	3rd place, bronze medalist(s)	Total
Umut Ünlü	Swimming	2	0	0	2

== Competitors ==
Sport	Men	Women	Total
Archery	4	5	9
Athletics	6	10	16
Badminton	0	2	2
Blind football	10	—N/a	10
Goalball	0	6	6
Judo	5	5	10
Paratriathlon	1	0	1
Powerlifting	2	3	5
Rowing	1	1	2
Shooting	3	5	8
Swimming	2	4	6
Table tennis	3	5	8
Taekwondo	4	4	8
Wheelchair Fencing	1	0	1
Wheelchair Tennis	2	0	2
Total	44	50	94

== Archery ==
Turkey entered nine athletes into the games by virtue of their result at the 2023 World Para Archery Championships in Plzeň, Czech Republic; and through 2024 World Qualification Tournament in Dubai, United Arab Emirates.

Men

Athlete	Event	Ranking Round		Round of 32	Round of 16	Quarterfinals	Semifinals	Finals	
Athlete	Event	Score	Seed	Opposition Score	Opposition Score	Opposition Score	Opposition Score	Opposition Score	Rank
Bahattin Hekimoğlu	Individual W1	661	2	—N/a	Tonon (ITA); L 134-138	Did not advance			5
Yiğit Caner Aydın	Individual W1	640	8	Anderson (RSA); L 132-133	Did not advance				9
Sadık Savaş	Individual Recurve	646	4	Rezende (BRA); W 6–0	Netsiri (THA); W 6–4	Arab Ameri (IRI); L 6–0	Did not advance		5
Yavuz Papağan	Individual Recurve	605	18	Fabčič (SLO); W 6–4	Kwak (KOR); L 2–6	Did not advance			9

Women

Athlete	Event	Ranking Round		Round of 32	Round of 16	Quarterfinals	Semifinals	Finals	
Athlete	Event	Score	Seed	Opposition Score	Opposition Score	Opposition Score	Opposition Score	Opposition Score	Rank
Nil Mısır	Individual W1	572	9	—N/a	Pellizzari (ITA); W 118-112	Musilová (CZE); L 125-126	Did not advance		5
Öznur Cüre	Individual Compound	704 WR	1	—N/a	Ferelly (INA); W 143-128	Adhana (IND); W 145-140	Grinham (GBR); W 145-143	Hemmati (IRI); W 144-141	1st place, gold medalist(s)
Sevgi Yorulmaz	Individual Compound	634	27	Chupin (FRA); L 127-130	Did not advance				17
Merve Nur Eroğlu	Individual Recurve	581	8	Bye	Olszewska (POL); L 0-6	Did not advance			9
Yağmur Şengül	Individual Recurve	579	10	Posada (CUB); W 6-0	Pooja (IND); L 0-6	Did not advance			9

Mixed

Athlete	Event	Ranking Round		Round of 16	Quarterfinals	Semifinals	Finals	
Athlete	Event	Score	Seed	Opposition Score	Opposition Score	Opposition Score	Opposition Score	Rank
Bahattin Hekimoğlu; Nil Mısır	Team W1	1233	5	—N/a	South Korea; L 132-134	Did not advance		5
Sadık Savaş; Merve Nur Eroğlu	Team Recurve	1227	3	—N/a	Ukraine; W 5-3	Slovenia; W 5-4	Italy; L 2-6	2nd place, silver medalist(s)

== Athletics ==
Turkish track and field athletes achieved quota places for the following events based on their results at the 2023 World Championships, 2024 World Championships, or through high performance allocation, as long as they meet the minimum entry standard (MES).

Key

- Note–Ranks given for track events are within the athlete's heat only
- Q = Qualified for the next round
- q = Qualified for the next round as a fastest loser or, in field events, by position without achieving the qualifying target
- DQ = Disqualified
- PR = Paralympic Record
- AR = Area (or continental) Record
- NR = National Record
- N/A = Round not applicable for the event
- Bye = Athlete not required to compete in round

Track & road events

Athlete	Event	Heat		Final	
Athlete	Event	Result	Rank	Result	Rank
~~Serkan Yıldırım~~	~~Men's 100 metres T12~~	~~10.89~~ DQ	~~1 Q~~	~~10.70~~ DQ	~~1~~
~~Serkan Yıldırım~~	~~Men's 400 m T12~~	—N/a DQ			
Oğuz Akbulut	Men's 400 m T12	50.04	4 Q	50.68	4
Mikail Al	Men's 1500 m T13	—N/a		3:55.34	8
Mikail Al	Men's 5000 m T13	—N/a		16:12.45	7
Aysel Önder	Women's 400 m T20	54.96 WR	1 Q	55.23	2nd place, silver medalist(s)
Hamide Doğangün	Women's 100 m T53	—N/a		16.88	6
Hamide Doğangün	Women's 400 m T53	—N/a		56.90	5
Hamide Doğangün	Women's 800 m T53	—N/a		1:51.70	4

Field events
Men

Athlete	Event	Final	
Athlete	Event	Distance	Position
Abdullah Ilgaz	High jump T47	1.98	4
Muhammet Atıcı	Shot Put F20	16.09	5
Mohammad Khalvandi	Javelin throw F57	49.97	2nd place, silver medalist(s)

Women

Athlete	Event	Final	
Athlete	Event	Distance	Position
Büşra Nur Tırıklı	Discus Throw F11	26.08	8
Esra Bayrak	Long Jump T20	5.64	4
Fatma Damla Altın	Long Jump T20	5.73	3rd place, bronze medalist(s)
Reyhan Taşdelen	Long Jump T20	5.11	12
Serap Demirkapu	Javelin throw F13	DNS	
Ebrar Keskin	Shot Put F20	13.66	5
Eda Yıldırım	Shot Put F20	11.95	13
Rabia Cirit	Shot Put F40	7.46	9

== Badminton ==
Turkey has qualified two para badminton players for the following events, through the release of BWF para-badminton Race to Paris Paralympic Ranking.

Athlete	Event	Group Stage				Quarterfinal	Semifinal	Final / BM	
Athlete	Event	Opposition Score	Opposition Score	Opposition Score	Rank	Opposition Score	Opposition Score	Opposition Score	Rank
Emine Seçkin	Women's singles WH2	Yamazaki (JPN); L (15–21, 14–21)	Yutong (CHN); L (5–21, 8–21)	—N/a	3	Did not advance			7
Halime Yıldız	Women's singles SL3	Ito (JPN); W (21–10, 21–4)	Henpraiwan (THA); W (21-12, 21–18)	Zuxian (CHN); L (9–21, 10-21)	2 Q	Kozyna (UKR); L (21–14, 15-21, 24-26)	Did not advance		5

== Blind football ==
The Turkish men's team qualified for the games after winning the 2022 European Championships held in Pescara, Italy.

Summary

Team	Event	Group Stage				7th–8th place	
Team	Event	Opposition Score	Opposition Score	Opposition Score	Rank	Opposition Score	Rank
Turkey men's	Men's tournament	Brazil; L 0–3	China; L 0–2	France; L 0–2	4	Japan; W 2–0	7

Team roster

Coach: Niyazi Metin

The following is the Turkey squad in the football 5-a-side tournament of the 2024 Summer Paralympics.

No.	Pos.	Player	Class	Date of birth (age)
1	GK	Hüseyin Saygılı	Sighted	6 May 1991 (aged 33)
2	MF	Recep Aydeniz	B1	19 December 1995 (aged 28)
3	DF	Muhammed Ali Öktem	B1	10 August 2001 (aged 23)
5	DF	Ertuğrul Demirel	B1	11 October 1990 (aged 33)
7	MF	Emre Aslan	B1	7 November 1996 (aged 27)
10	MF	Celal Çoban	B1	23 June 1993 (aged 31)
11	FW	Hasan Şatay	B1	7 October 1994 (aged 29)
14	FW	Oğuzhan Yokuş	B1	13 September 1996 (aged 27)
16	DF	Semih Deniz	B1	4 January 1989 (aged 35)
23	GK	Kerem Yıldırır	Sighted	25 January 2004 (aged 20)

Group stage

Pos	Team	Pld	W	D	L	GF	GA	GD	Pts	Qualification
1	Brazil	3	2	1	0	6	0	+6	7	Semi-finals
2	France (H)	3	2	0	1	3	3	0	6	Semi-finals
3	China	3	1	1	1	2	1	+1	4	Fifth place match
4	Turkey	3	0	0	3	0	7	−7	0	Seventh place match

Source: Paris 2024
(H) Hosts
1 September 2024
18:30

Brazil	3–0	Turkey
Nonato 6' (pen.), 21' (pen.); Gonçalves 20'	Report

Eiffel Tower Stadium, Paris
Attendance: 9,160
Referee: Jose Alfredo Martinez Ibarra (Mexico)

2 September 2024
18:30

Turkey	0–2	China
	Report	Zhu 20'; Tang 24'

Eiffel Tower Stadium, Paris
Attendance: 8,814
Referee: Rodolphe-Marc-Pierrick Bonnin (France)

3 September 2024
20:30

Turkey	0–2	France
	Report	Villeroux 5'; Baron 20'

Eiffel Tower Stadium, Paris
Attendance: 10,580
Referee: Jose Alfredo Martinez Ibarra (Mexico)

Seventh place match

5 September 2024
10:30

Turkey	2–0	Japan
Şatay 22'; Aslan 29'	Report

Eiffel Tower Stadium, Paris
Attendance: 8,979
Referee: Ellen Dayane Grosskopf (Brazil)

== Goalball ==
Summary

Team	Event	Group Stage				Quarterfinal	Semifinal	Final / BM	
Team	Event	Opposition Score	Opposition Score	Opposition Score	Rank	Opposition Score	Opposition Score	Opposition Score	Rank
Turkey women's	Women's tournament	Brazil; D 3–3	China; L 5–7	Israel; W 5–4	2 Q	South Korea; W 6–3	Brazil; W 3–1	Israel; W 8–3	1st place, gold medalist(s)

=== Women's tournament ===
The Turkish women's goalball team entered the Paralympic games after winning the 2022 IBSA Goalball World Championships in Matosinhos, Portugal.

Team roster

Coach: Gultekin Karasu

The following is the Turkey squad in the goalball tournament of the 2024 Summer Paralympics.

No.	Player	Class	Date of birth (age)
1	Fatma Gül Güler	B2	12 February 2004 (aged 20)
2	Reyhan Yılmaz	B2	18 November 2001 (aged 22)
3	Sevda Altunoluk	B2	1 April 1994 (aged 30)
4	Şeydanur Kaplan	B2	23 March 2000 (aged 24)
7	Sevtap Altunoluk	B3	1 October 1995 (aged 28)
8	Berfin Altan	B3	24 November 2003 (aged 20)

Group stage

Pos	Team	Pld	W	D	L	GF	GA	GD	Pts	Qualification
1	China	3	3	0	0	16	7	+9	9	Quarter-finals
2	Turkey	3	1	1	1	13	14	−1	4	Quarter-finals
3	Israel	3	1	0	2	13	15	−2	3	Quarter-finals
4	Brazil	3	0	1	2	8	14	−6	1	Quarter-finals

Source: Paris 2024
Rules for classification: 1) points; 2) goal difference; 3) number of wins; 4) goals against; 5) head-to-head goal difference.
29 August 2024
10:30

Turkey	3–3	Brazil
Sevd. Altunoluk 2', 4', 22'	Report	de Lima 0', 7'; Vitorino 12'

South Paris Arena, Paris
Referee:
Romualdas Vaitekus (Lithuania)
Janice Dawson (Canada)

30 August 2024
19:00

China	7–5	Turkey
Wang Chunyan 1', 6', 6', 12', 13', 13', 16'	Report	Sevt. Altunoluk 0', 1', 3', 5'; Güler 5'

South Paris Arena, Paris
Referee:
Janice Dawson (Canada)
Sarah Kuper (Germany)

31 August 2024
10:30

Turkey	5–4	Israel
Sevd. Altunoluk 7', 8', 8', 14'; Güler 9'	Report	Mahamid 13'; Ben-David 15', 20'; Mizrahi 23'

South Paris Arena, Paris
Referee:
Claude Dagenais (Canada)
Antonios Christodoulos (Greece)

Quarter-finals

3 September 2024
19:45

Turkey	6–3	South Korea
Sevd. Altunoluk 0', 2', 6', 12'; Güler 6'; Altan 22'	Report	Seo Min-ji 5'; Sim Seon-hwa 17', 23'

South Paris Arena, Paris
Referee:
Antonios Christodoulos (Greece)
Linda Welborn (United States)

Semi-finals

4 September 2024
19:45

Brazil	1–3	Turkey
Vitorino 6'	Report	Güler 2'; Altunoluk 3', 8'

South Paris Arena, Paris
Referee:
Manar Obeidat (Jordan)
Juha Vuokila (Finland)

Bronze medal match

5 September 2024
17:45

Israel	3–8	Turkey
Ben-David 3', 8', 18'	Report	Sevd. Altunoluk 1', 3', 4', 15'; Güler 1', 4', 5', 8'

South Paris Arena, Paris
Referee:
Kazuto Ono (Japan)
Raquel Aguado (Spain)

== Judo ==
Men

Athlete	Event	Round of 16	Quarterfinals	Semifinals	Repechage 1	Repechage 2	Final / BM	
Athlete	Event	Opposition Result	Opposition Result	Opposition Result	Opposition Result	Opposition Result	Opposition Result	Rank
Gökçe Yavuz	−73 kg J1	Iafa (POR); L 00–10	Did not advance					9
Yasin Çimciler	−90 kg J1	Bye	Teodori (ITA); W 10–00	Cavalcante (BRA); L 00–11	—N/a	Bye	Crețul (MDA); L 01–10	5
Onur Taştan	+90 kg J1	—N/a	Dashtseren (MGL); L 00–10	Did not advance	—N/a	Utepov (KAZ); W 10–00	Grandry (FRA); L 00–10	5
Recep Çiftçi	−73 kg J2	Vargoczki (ROM); L 00–10	Did not advance					9
İbrahim Bölükbaşı	+90 kg J2	—N/a	Bye	Skelley (GBR); W 01–00	—N/a	Bye	Chikoidze (GEO); W 01–00	1st place, gold medalist(s)

Women

Athlete	Event	Round of 16	Quarterfinals	Semifinals	Repechage	Final / BM	
Athlete	Event	Opposition Result	Opposition Result	Opposition Result	Opposition Result	Opposition Result	Rank
Ecem Taşın	−48 kg J1	Bye	Müller (GER); W 10–00	Hangai (JPN); L 00–01	Bye	Masourou (GRE); W 10-00	3rd place, bronze medalist(s)
Merve Uslu	−70 kg J1	Bye	Souza (BRA); L 00–10	Did not advance	Lauria (ITA); W 10–00	Pernheim (SWE); L 00–11	5
Nazan Akın Güneş	+70 kg J1	Bye	Ismiyeva (AZE); W 10–00	Zoaga (BRA); L 00-10	Bye	Ergasheva (UZB); W 10–00	3rd place, bronze medalist(s)
Cahide Eke	−48 kg J2	Bye	Ivanytska (UKR); W 01–00	Nauatbek (KAZ); L 00–11	Bye	Thal (GER); W 10-00	3rd place, bronze medalist(s)
Döndü Yeşilyurt	−57 kg J2	Brussig (GER); W 11–00	Arce Payno (ESP); L 00–11	Did not advance	Wang (CHN); W 10–01	Fedossova (KAZ); L 00–11	5

== Paratriathlon ==
One triathletes earned quota places for Turkey in paratriathlon at the 2024 Summer Paralympics.

Athlete	Event	Swim	Trans 1	Bike	Trans 2	Run	Total time	Rank
Uğurcan Özer	Men's PTS5	11:32	0:58	30:51	0:32	17:24	1:01:17	6

== Powerlifting ==
Turkey secured five quotas by virtue of the world rankings when the qualifying period ended on 26 June 2024.

Athlete	Event	Total lifted	Rank
Abdullah Kayapınar	Men's −49 kg	180	2nd place, silver medalist(s)
Uğur Yumuk	Men's −72 kg	180	7
Nazmiye Muratlı	Women's −45 kg	108	3rd place, bronze medalist(s)
Besra Duman	Women's −55 kg	113	2nd place, silver medalist(s)
Sibel Çam	Women's −73 kg	120	3rd place, bronze medalist(s)

== Rowing ==
Athlete	Event	Heats		Repechage		Final	
Athlete	Event	Time	Rank	Time	Rank	Time	Rank
Nurşen Şen; Yiğit Doğukan Bozkurt	PR2 mixed double sculls	9:28.00	5 R	9:50.70	5 FB	10:01.19	9

== Shooting ==
Turkey entered three para-shooter's after achieved quota places for the following events by virtue of their best finishes at the 2022, 2023 and 2024 world cup, 2022 World Championships, 2023 World Championships, 2023 European Para Championships and 2024 European Championships, as long as they obtained a minimum qualifying score (MQS) by July 15, 2024.

Men

Athlete	Event	Qualification		Final	
Athlete	Event	Points	Rank	Points	Rank
Murat Oğuz	P1 - 10 m air pistol SH1	560	12	Did not advance	
Muharrem Korhan Yamaç	P1 - 10 m air pistol SH1	555	17	Did not advance	

Women

Athlete	Event	Qualification		Final	
Athlete	Event	Points	Rank	Points	Rank
Aysel Özgan	P2 - 10 m air pistol SH1	560	4 Q	231.1	2nd place, silver medalist(s)
Ayşegül Pehlivanlar	P2 - 10 m air pistol SH1	556	7 Q	190.9	4
Çağla Baş	R2 – 10 m air rifle standing SH1	613.0	14	Did not advance	

Mixed

Athlete	Event	Qualification		Final	
Athlete	Event	Points	Rank	Points	Rank
Murat Oğuz	P3 – 25 m pistol SH1	540	23	Did not advance	
Muharrem Korhan Yamaç	P3 – 25 m pistol SH1	561	15	Did not advance	
Cevat Karagöl	P4 – 50 m pistol SH1	495	27	Did not advance	
Ayşegül Pehlivanlar	P4 – 50 m pistol SH1	533	8 Q	142.7	6
Erhan Coşkuner	R3 – 10 m air rifle prone SH1	632.7	12	Did not advance	
Erhan Coşkuner	R6 - 50 metre rifle prone SH1	609.1	32	Did not advance	
Hakan Çevik	R5 – 10 m air rifle standing SH2	619.1	28	Did not advance	
Hakan Çevik	R5 – 10 m air rifle prone SH2	635.7	10	Did not advance	

== Swimming ==
Men

Athlete	Event	Heats		Final	
Athlete	Event	Result	Rank	Result	Rank
Umut Ünlü	50 m freestyle S3	44.90	1 Q	44.83	1st place, gold medalist(s)
Umut Ünlü	50 m backstroke S3	52.97	7 Q	53.17	7
Umut Ünlü	200m individual medley SM3	3:16.68	5 Q	3:18.00	6
Umut Ünlü	200 m freestyle S3	3:20.29	1 Q	3:19.53	1st place, gold medalist(s)
Turgut Aslan Yaraman	100 m freestyle S8	1:00.64	10	Did not advance	
Turgut Aslan Yaraman	100 m backstroke S8	1:08.87	7Q	1:07.72	4
Turgut Aslan Yaraman	200m individual medley SM8	2:32.28	11	Did not advance	
Turgut Aslan Yaraman	400 m freestyle S8	4:45.71	14	Did not advance	

Women

Athlete	Event	Heats		Final	
Athlete	Event	Result	Rank	Result	Rank
Sümeyye Boyacı	50 m butterfly S5	51.87	8 Q	49.67	7
Sümeyye Boyacı	50 m backstroke S5	43.84	5 Q	43.30	4
Sümeyye Boyacı	100 m freestyle S5	1:32.44	10	Did not advance	
Sümeyye Boyacı	200 m freestyle S5	3:17.25	12	Did not advance	
Sevilay Öztürk	50 m butterfly S5	44.70	3 Q	43.70	3rd place, bronze medalist(s)
Sevilay Öztürk	50 m backstroke S5	45.34	8 Q	43.30	7
Sevilay Öztürk	100 m freestyle S5	1:35.50	14	Did not advance	
Sevilay Öztürk	200m individual medley SM5	4:00.04	10	Did not advance	
Elif İldem	50 m backstroke S2	1:44.64	9	Did not advance	
Elif İldem	100 m backstroke S2	3:37.03	9	Did not advance	
Meryem Nur Tunug	200 m freestyle S5	3:37.91	17	Did not advance	
Meryem Nur Tunug	200m individual medley SM5	4:19.93	14	Did not advance	

== Table tennis ==
Turkey entered seven athletes for the Paralympic games. Ebru Acer take her spot after winning the 2023 Virtus Global Games held in Vichy, France. Later on, the other quotas being secure by Abdullah Öztürk and Kübra Öçsoy Korkut by virtue of their gold medal results in their respective class, thought the 2023 European Championships in Sheffield, Great Britain. Meanwhile, the other athletes vying for the games through the allocations of final ITTF world ranking.

Men

Athlete	Event	Round of 16	Quarterfinals	Semifinals/ BM	Final	
Athlete	Event	Opposition Result	Opposition Result	Opposition Result	Opposition Result	Rank
Abdullah Öztürk	Individual C4	Ogunkunle (NGR); L 1-3	Did not advance			9
Nesim Turan	Individual C4	Rodríguez (CHI); W 3-1	Kim (KOR); L 1-3	Did not advance		5
Ali Öztürk	Individual C5	Liu (CHN); W 3-2	Baus (GER); W 3-2	Urhaug (NOR); L 0–3	Did not advance	3rd place, bronze medalist(s)
Abdullah Öztürk; Nesim Turan	Doubles MD8	Argentina; W 3–1	South Korea; W 3–0	Germany; L 2–3	Did not advance	3rd place, bronze medalist(s)

Women

Athlete	Event	Round of 16	Quarterfinals	Semifinals/ BM	Final	
Athlete	Event	Opposition Result	Opposition Result	Opposition Result	Opposition Result	Rank
Hatice Duman	Individual C3	Ragazzini (ITA); L 0-3	Did not advance			9
Kübra Öçsoy Korkut	Individual C7	Bye	Perez (MEX); W 3-2	Twomey (GBR); W 3-2	van Zon (NED); W 2-3	2nd place, silver medalist(s)
Merve Demir	Individual C10	Partyka (POL); L 0-3	Did not advance			9
Ebru Acer	Individual C11	Bye	Ferney (FRA); W 3-1	Wada (JPN); L 2-3	Did not advance	3rd place, bronze medalist(s)
Merve Demir; Neslihan Kavas	Women's doubles WD20	Sweden; W 3–0	Chinese Taipei; L 0–3	Did not advance		5

Doubles

Athlete	Event	Round of 32	Round of 16	Quarterfinals	Semifinals	Final / BM	
Athlete	Event	Opposition Result	Opposition Result	Opposition Result	Opposition Result	Opposition Result	Rank
Abdullah Öztürk; Hatice Duman	Doubles MD8	—N/a	Slovakia; L 0–3	Did not advance			9

== Taekwondo ==
Turkey entered eight athletes to compete at the Paralympics competition. All of them qualified for Paris 2024, by virtue of finishing within the top six in the Paralympic rankings in their respective division.

Men

Athlete	Event	First round	Quarterfinals	Semifinals	Repechage	Final / BM	
Athlete	Event	Opposition Result	Opposition Result	Opposition Result	Opposition Result	Opposition Result	Rank
Ali Can Özcan	–58 kg	Bye	Villalobos (ESP); W 22–17	Zeynalov (AZE); W 23–18	—N/a	Yasur (ISR); L 12–19	2nd place, silver medalist(s)
Mahmut Bozteke	–63 kg	Bye	Milad (ISR); W 30–7	Torquato (BRA); W 10–6	—N/a	Erdene (MGL); W 9–7	1st place, gold medalist(s)
Fatih Çelik	–70 kg	Bye	Nikoladze (GEO); W 24–19	Kudo (JPN); W 15–10	—N/a	Khalilov (AZE); L 2–15	2nd place, silver medalist(s)
Mehmet Sami Saraç	+80 kg	Keita (SEN); L 4–6	Did not advance				11

Women

Athlete	Event	First round	Quarterfinals	Semifinals	Repechage	Final / BM	
Athlete	Event	Opposition Result	Opposition Result	Opposition Result	Opposition Result	Opposition Result	Rank
Nurcihan Ekinci	–47 kg	Tanwar (IND); W 19–0	Phuangkitcha (THA); L 4–8	Did not advance	Khudadadi (RPT); L 1–9	Did not advance	7
Meryem Betül Çavdar	–52 kg	Bye	Japaridze (GEO); L 6–7	—N/a	Stumpf (BRA); W 8–6	Quijano (MEX); W 6–3	3rd place, bronze medalist(s)
Gamze Gürdal	–57 kg	Bye	War (FIJ); W 29–5	Mičev (SRB); W 14–1	—N/a	Yujie (CHN); L 0–11	2nd place, silver medalist(s)
Seçil Er	–65 kg	Bye	Dassi (CMR); L 6–13	Did not advance	Gkentzou (GRE); L 2–23	Did not advance	7

== Wheelchair fencing ==
At the end of the qualification period, Turkey had qualified the following fencer for Paris. One fencer were announced in Turkey's squad for the Games.

Individual

Athlete	Event	Round of 16	Quarterfinals	Semifinals	Repechage 4	Final / BM	
Athlete	Event	Opposition Result	Opposition Result	Opposition Result	Opposition Result	Opposition Result	Rank
Hakan Akkaya	Men's foil A	Kano (JPN); W 15–12	Ovsath (HUN); W 15–14	Betti (ITA); L 9–15	Lambertini (ITA); L 11–15	Did not Advance	6
Hakan Akkaya	Men's épée A	Nalewajek (POL); W 15–5	Rossi (ITA); W 15–10	Gilliver (GBR); L 6–15	Manko (UKR); W 14–13	Lambertini (ITA); W 15–13	3rd place, bronze medalist(s)

== Wheelchair tennis ==
Turkey entered two players into the Paralympics.

Athlete	Event	Round of 16	Quarterfinals	Semifinals	Final / BM	
Athlete	Event	Opposition Result	Opposition Result	Opposition Result	Opposition Result	Rank
Ahmet Kaplan	Quads singles	Wagner (USA); W 6–1, 6-2	Lapthorne (GBR); W 6-4, 3-6, 6-3	Vink (NED); L 1-6, 1-6	Sasson (ISR) L 7-5, 4-6, 1-6	4
Uğur Altınel	Quads singles	Slade (GBR); L 6–7^{6–8}, 7–6^{7–1}, 6–1	Did not advance			9
Ahmet Kaplan; Uğur Altınel	Quads doubles	—N/a	Pena / Silva (BRA); L 2-6, 1-6	Did not advance		5

== See also ==
- Turkey at the 2024 Summer Olympics
- Turkey at the Paralympics
