= European Para-Archery Championships =

International sporting competition

The European Para-Archery Championships is a competition for European disabled archers.

== Editions ==
Number	Year	City	Country	Date
	2006	Nymburk	Czech Republic	
	2010	Vichy	France	9–14 August
	2014	Nottwil	Switzerland	26 July – 3 August
	2016	Saint-Jean-de-Monts	France	2–10 April
	2018	Plzeň	Czech Republic	11–19 August
	~~2020~~†	Olbia	Italy	18–26 April
	2022	Rome	Italy	2–8 August

- † The 2020 European Championships were cancelled due to the COVID-19 pandemic.

== Medal table ==
As of 2022.

Rank	Nation	Gold	Silver	Bronze	Total
1	Great Britain	14	15	12	41
2	Italy	12	12	16	40
3	Russia	12	11	7	30
4	Turkey	7	11	11	29
5	Poland	6	3	3	12
6	Czech Republic	3	3	4	10
7	Finland	3	1	1	5
8	Germany	2	1	2	5
8	Sweden	2	1	2	5
10	Slovakia	2	0	1	3
10	Switzerland	2	0	1	3
12	France	1	5	2	8
13	Ukraine	1	0	3	4
14	Belgium	1	0	0	1
14	Romania	1	0	0	1
16	Spain	0	2	2	4
17	Cyprus	0	2	0	2
18	Greece	0	1	0	1
18	Netherlands	0	1	0	1
20	Andorra	0	0	1	1
Totals (20 entries)		69	69	68	206

== Medalists ==
=== 2010 (Vichy) ===
Event	Gold	Silver	Bronze
Men's compound W1	Finland; Jean-Pierre Antonios	Czech Republic; David Drahoninsky	Finland; Osmo Kinnunen
Men's compound class open	Switzerland; Philippe Horner	Italy; Alberto Simonelli	Great Britain; John Stubbs
Women's compound class open	Great Britain; Danielle Brown	Great Britain; Pippa Britton	Sweden; Zandra Reppe
Men's recurve W2	Great Britain; Paul Browne	Turkey; Mustafa Demir	Poland; Piotr Sawicki
Women's recurve W2	Ukraine; Roksolana Dzoba	Italy; Elisabetta Mijno	Turkey; Hatice Bayar
Men's recurve standing	Russia; Mikhail Oyun	France; Alexandre Lasvenes	Russia; Timur Tuchinov
Women's recurve standing	Great Britain; Kay Lucas	Netherlands; Eliane Salden-Otten	Switzerland; Magali Comte
Visually impaired open	France; Noel Gabriele	Italy; Claudio Peruffo	Italy; Filomena Autiero
Men's compound team	Switzerland; Olivier Gradel; Philippe Horner; Martin Imboden	Great Britain; John Murray; John Stubbs; Eric Thomas	Sweden; Pierre Claesson; Robert Larsson; Hakan Tornstrom
Women's compound team	Russia; Stepanida Artakhinova; Marina Lyznnikova; Olga Polegaeva	Great Britain; Danielle Brown; Pippa Britton; Melanie Clarke	Turkey; Aliye Cayci; Gülbin Su; Semray Tas Ozer
Men's recurve team	Russia; Timur Tuchinov; Mikhail Oyun; Oleg Shestakov	Great Britain; Kenny Allen; Phillip Bottomley; Paul Browne	Italy; Oscar De Pellegrin; Mario Esposito; Marco Vitale
Women's recurve team	Turkey; Hatice Bayar; Ozlem Hacer Kalay; Hanife Ozturk	Italy; Veronica Floreno; Elisabetta Mijno; Mariangela Perna	Czech Republic; Miroslava Cerna; Lenka Kuncova; Marketa Sidkova
Mixed compound team	Great Britain; John Stubbs; Danielle Brown	Sweden; Robert Larsson; Zandra Reppe	Turkey; Erdogan Aygan; Gülbin Su
Mixed recurve team	Italy; Oscar De Pellegrin; Elisabetta Mijno	Great Britain; Kenny Allen; Kate Murray	Poland; Tomasz Lezanski; Grażyna Wojciechowska

=== 2014 (Nottwil) ===
129 archers from 24 countries participated.

Event	Gold	Silver	Bronze
Recurve men open	Bato Tsydendorzhiev (RUS)	Stephane Gilbert (FRA)	Alessandro Erario (ITA)
Recurve women open	Elisabetta Mijno (ITA)	Milena Olszewska (POL)	Svetlana Barantseva (RUS)
Compound women open	Zandra Reppe (SWE)	Mel Clarke (GBR)	Burcu Dağ (TUR)
Compound men open	Marcel Pavlik (SVK)	Jere Forsberg (FIN)	John Stubbs (GBR)
Men W1 (recurve/comp)	Jean-Pierre Antonios (FIN)	John Cavanagh (GBR)	David Drahonínský (CZE)
Women W1 (recurve/comp)	Jo Frith (GBR)	Vicky Jenkins (GBR)	Chloe Ball (GBR)
Compound mixed team	Turkey; Doğan Hancı; Burcu Dağ	Russia; Aleksander Zubar; Stepanida Artakhinova	Great Britain; John Stubbs; Mel Clarke
Compound mixed team	Poland; Ireneusz Kapusta; Milena Olszewska	Germany; Maik Szarszewski; Jennifer Hess	Great Britain; Hazel Chaisty; Kate Murray; David Phillips
Recurve men open team	Great Britain; David Phillips; Paul Browne; Simon Powell	Russia; Bato Tsydendorzhiev; Ruslan Ochur; Anton Ziapaev	Italy; Ezio Luvisetto; Alessandro Erario; Roberto Airoldi
Recurve women open team	Italy; Elisabetta Mijno; Veronica Floreno; Annalisa Rosada	Russia; Svetlana Barantseva; Irina Batorova; Margarita Sidorenko	Turkey; Merve Nur Eroğlu; Ozlem Kalay; Hatice Bayar
Compound men open team	Italy; Alberto Simonelli; Mirco Falcier; Matteo Bonacina	Turkey; Doğan Hancı; Erdoğan Aygan; Bülent Korkmaz	France; Philippe Horner; Bryan Leloup; Eric Pereira
Compound women open team	Germany; Karina Granitza; Lucia Kupczyk; Vanessa Bui	Russia; Stepanida Artakhinova; Olga Polegaeva; Valentina Pavlova	Turkey; Burcu Dağ; Gülbin Su; Handan Biroğlu
Mixed team W1 (rec/comp)	Great Britain; John Cavanagh; Jo Frith	Russia; Elena Krutova; Konstantin Donskoi	Only two teams competed

=== 2016 (Saint-Jean-de-Monts) ===
Event	Gold	Silver	Bronze
Visually impaired 2 / 3	Steve Prowse (GBR)	Christophe Gerardin (FRA)	Claudio Peruffo (ITA)
Recurve men open	Bato Tsydendorzhiev (RUS)	Maxime Guerin (FRA)	Maik Szarszewski (GER)
Recurve women open	Svetlana Barantseva (RUS)	Merve Nur Eroğlu (TUR)	Milena Olszewska (POL)
Compound men open	Alberto Simonelli (ITA)	Aleksandr Zubar (RUS)	Guillermo Rodríguez González (ESP)
Compound women open	Tatiana Andrievskaia (RUS)	Handan Biroğlu (TUR)	Stepanida Artakhinova (RUS)
Men W1 (rec/comp)	David Drahonínský (CZE)	Omer Asik (TUR)	Igor Meshkov (RUS)
Women W1 (rec/comp)	Jo Frith (GBR)	Jessica Stretton (GBR)	Vicky Jenkins (GBR)
Recurve mixed team open	Poland; Milena Olszewska; Piotr Sawicki	Russia; Bato Tsydendorzhiev; Svetlana Barantseva	Italy; Roberto Airoldi; Elisabetta Mijno; Annalisa Rosada
Compound mixed team open	Sweden; Zandra Reppe; Pierre Claesson	Italy; Alberto Simonelli; Eleonora Sarti	Ukraine; Kseniya Markitantova; Serhiy Atamanenko
Recurve men open team	Poland; Ireneusz Kapusta; Piotr Sawicki; Pawel Daleszynski	France; Nicolas Mennesson; Maxime Guerin; Stephane Gilbert	Italy; Roberto Airoldi; Ezio Luvisetto; Alessandro Erario
Recurve women open team	Russia; Margarita Sidorenko; Svetlana Barantseva; Irina Rossiyskaya	Turkey; Zehra Özbey Torun; Merve Nur Eroğlu; Hatice Bayar	Great Britain; Hazel Chaisty; Amanda George; Tania Nadarajah
Compound men open team	Turkey; Erdoğan Aygan; Doğan Hancı; Bülent Korkmaz	Italy; Giampaolo Cancelli; Alberto Simonelli; Matteo Bonacina	Ukraine; Pavlo Nazar; Serhiy Atamanenko; Ivan Dziadyk
Compound women open team	Germany; Lucia Kupczyk; Vanessa Bui; Karina Granitza	Russia; Stepanida Artakhinova; Tatiana Andrievskaia; Nonna Alexandrova	Ukraine; Natalia Pavuk; Kseniya Markitantova; Larysa Mikhnieva
Mixed team W1 (rec/comp)	Great Britain; Jo Frith; John Walker	Russia; Elena Krutova; Igor Meshkov	Spain; Liliana Oliveros Leal; Manuel Sanchez Camus

=== 2018 (Plzeň) ===
126 archers from 27 nations competed.

Event	Gold	Silver	Bronze
Men's visually impaired 1	Italy; Matteo Panariello	Cyprus; Christos Misos	Andorra; Jordi Casellas
Men's visually impaired 2/3	Great Britain; Steve Prowse	Italy; Giovanni Maria Vaccaro	Great Britain; Nicholas Thomas
Men's recurve open	Poland; Ireneusz Kapusta	Russia; Bato Tsydendorzhiev	Germany; Maik Szarszewski
Women's recurve open	Poland; Milena Olszewska	Turkey; Merve Nur Eroglu	Italy; Elisabetta Mijno
Men's compound open	Italy; Matteo Bonacina	Russia; Nail Gatin	Slovakia; Marcel Pavlik
Women's compound open	Russia; Stepanida Artakhinova	Italy; Maria Andrea Virgilio	Russia; Yulia Alekseeva
Men's W1	Turkey; Bahattin Hekimoglu	Czech Republic; David Drahoninsky	Turkey; Naci Yenier
Women's W1	Great Britain; Jo Frith	Great Britain; Victoria Rumary	Italy; Asia Pellizzari
Men's recurve open team	Russia; Sergey Khutakov; Bato Tsydendorzhiev; Anton Ziapaev	Poland; Pawel Daleszynski; Ireneusz Kapusta; Piotr Sawicki	Italy; Roberto Airoldi; Fabio Tomasulo; Stefano Travisani
Men's compound open team	Italy; Matteo Bonacina; Giampaolo Cancelli; Alberto Simonelli	Turkey; Erdogan Aygan; Taner Eren; Bulent Korkmaz	Russia; Nail Gatin; Ivan Kozlov; Ruslan Ramazanov
Women's compound open team	Russia; Yulia Alekseeva; Nonna Alexandrova; Stepanida Artakhinova	Italy; Giulia Pesci; Eleonora Sarti; Maria Andrea Virgilio	Czech Republic; Tereza Brandtlova; Lenka Kuncova; Sarka Musilova
Mixed recurve team open	Russia; Sergey Khutakov; Svetlana Barantseva	Poland; Pawel Daleszynski; Milena Olszewska	Great Britain; David Phillips; Hazel Chaisty
Mixed compound team open	Slovakia; Marcel Pavlik; Diana Pashchenkova	Great Britain; Nathan MacQueen; Jessica Stretton	Russia; Nail Gatin; Stepanida Artakhinova
Mixed W1 team	Czech Republic; David Drahoninsky; Sarka Musilova	Great Britain; John Cavanagh; Victoria Rumary	Italy; Daniele Cassiani; Asia Pellizzari

=== 2022 (Rome) ===
Event	Gold	Silver	Bronze
Men's visually impaired 1	Belgium; Ruben Van Hollebeke	Cyprus; Christos Misos	Italy; Matteo Panariello
Men's visually impaired 2/3	Italy; Daniele Piran	Spain; Adrián Orjales Vidal	Great Britain; Phillip Tranter
Men's recurve open	Romania; Eugen Patru	Turkey; Yavuz Papağan	Italy; Stefano Travisani
Women's recurve open	Italy; Elisabetta Mijno	Greece; Dorothea Poimenidou	Turkey; Merve Nur Eroğlu
Men's compound open	Finland; Jere Forsberg	Italy; Matteo Bonacina	France; Maxime Guérin
Women's compound open	Great Britain; Phoebe Paterson Pine	Turkey; Öznur Cüre	Great Britain; Jessica Stretton
Men's W1 open	Czech Republic; David Drahoninsky	Turkey; Yiğit Caner Aydın	Turkey; Bahattin Hekimoğlu
Women's W1 open	Turkey; Nil Mısır	Czech Republic; Tereza Brandtlova	Italy; Asia Pellizzari
Men's recurve open doubles	Turkey; Yavuz Papağan; Sadık Savaş	Great Britain; David Phillips; Cameron Radigan	Italy; Stefano Travisani; Giuseppe Verzini
Men's compound open doubles	Italy; Matteo Bonacina; Giampaolo Cancelli	Spain; Fernando Galé Montorio; Adrián Martínez Torre	Great Britain; Jamie Harris; Nathan MacQueen
Women's compound open doubles	Turkey; Öznur Cüre; Sevgi Yorulmaz	Great Britain; Phoebe Paterson Pine; Jessica Stretton	Italy; Eleonora Sarti; Maria Andrea Virgilio
Mixed recurve team open	Poland; Milena Olszewska; Lukasz Ciszek	Italy; Elisabetta Mijno; Stefano Travisani	Turkey; Merve Nur Eroğlu; Yavuz Papağan
Mixed compound team open	Great Britain; Jessica Stretton; Nathan MacQueen	Italy; Maria Andrea Virgilio; Matteo Bonacina	Turkey; Öznur Cüre; Bülent Korkmaz
Mixed W1 team	Italy; Asia Pellizzari; Paolo Tonon	Great Britain; Victoria Kingstone; Martin Saych	Czech Republic; Tereza Brandtlova; David Drahoninsky

== See also ==
- European Archery Championships
- World Para Archery Championship
