= Archery at the 2024 Summer Paralympics – Women's individual recurve open =

Archery, Women's recurve open at the XVII Paralympic Games
- Dates: 29 August – 4 September 2024
- Competitors: 23 from 19 nations

Medalists
1st place, gold medalist(s)		Wu Chunyan	China
2nd place, silver medalist(s)		Wu Yang	China
3rd place, bronze medalist(s)		Elisabetta Mijno	Italy

The women's individual recurve open archery discipline at the 2024 Summer Paralympics will be contested from 29 August to 3 September at Les Invalides.

In the ranking rounds each archer shoots 72 arrows, and is seeded according to score. In the knock-out stages each archer shoots three arrows per set against an opponent, the scores being aggregated. Losing semifinalists compete in a bronze medal match. As the field contained 24 archers, the eight highest-ranked archers in the ranking round, will progress directly to the round of 16 places.

== Record ==
Records are:

World record	Elisabetta Mijno (ITA)	674	Rotterdam, Netherlands	15 August 2023
Paralympic record	Wu Chunyan (CHN)	642	Tokyo, Japan	27 August 2021

== Ranking round ==
The ranking round of the men's individual recurve event will be held on 29 August.

Rank	Archer	Nationality	10	X	Total	Note
1	Elisabetta Mijno	Italy	20	5	641	
2	Wu Chunyan	China	14	6	630	
3	Selengee Demberel	Mongolia	18	7	622	
4	Wu Yang	China	13	6	603	
5	Dorothea Poimenidou	Greece	11	1	588	
6	Živa Lavrinc	Slovenia	10	4	588	
7	Pooja Jatyan	India	10	1	585	
8	Merve Nur Eroğlu	Turkey	11	7	581	
9	Milena Olszewska	Poland	11	4	580	
10	Yağmur Şengül	Turkey	15	7	579	
11	Flora Kliem	Germany	8	0	578	
12	Somayeh Rahimi	Iran	10	1	574	
13	Phattaraphon Pattawaeo	Thailand	6	1	571	
14	María Daza	Colombia	9	3	558	
15	Veronica Floreno	Italy	11	3	552	
16	Amanda Jennings	Australia	7	1	531	
17	Wahyu Retno Wulandari	Indonesia	9	1	526	
18	Oyun-Erdene Buyanjargal	Mongolia	8	2	524	
19	Anna-Viktoriia Shevchenko	Ukraine	6	1	514	
20	Jang Gyeong-suk	South Korea	8	2	510	
21	Aziza Benhami	France	7	1	466	
22	Daniela Campos	Peru	2	2	459	
23	Leydis Posada	Cuba	3	2	456	

== Knockout rounds ==
The knockout rounds will be held on 3 September 2024.

=== Top half ===
Round of 32
17	Wulandari (INA)	3	23	13	25	17	25
16	Jennings (AUS)	7	23	22	27	15	27
21	Benhami (FRA)	0	22	21	23	-	-
12	Rahimi (IRI)	6	28	24	27	-
13	Pattawaeo (THA)	6	22	23	22	-	-
20	Jang (KOR)	0	5	15	20	-	-

Round of 16
1	Mijno (ITA)	6	29	28	25	-	-
16	Jennings (AUS)	0	24	26	24	-	-
9	Olszewska (POL)	6	26	24	25	-	-
8	Eroğlu (TUR)	0	24	21	23	-	-
5	Poimenidou (GRE)	0	22	25	24	-	-
12	Rahimi (IRI)	6	27	27	26	-	-
13	Pattawaeo (THA)	0	22	22	26	-	-
4	Wu Y (CHN)	6	28	24	28	-	-

Quarterfinals
1	Mijno (ITA)	6	26	27	27	-	-
9	Olszewska (POL)	0	21	23	23	-	-
12	Rahimi (IRI)	0	22	17	22	-	-
4	Wu Y (CHN)	6	26	25	23	-	-

Semifinals
1	Mijno (ITA)	4	29	25	26	29	25
4	Wu Y (CHN)	6	24	28	27	26	26

=== Bottom half ===
Round of 32
19	Shevchenko (UKR)	6	23	26	24	26	-
14	Daza (COL)	2	25	17	21	19	-
11	Kliem (GER)	6	22	24	19	23	-
22	Campos (PER)	2	20	13	21	17	-
23	Posada (CUB)	0	15	18	20	-	-
10	Şengül (TUR)	6	26	23	24	-	-
15	Floreno (ITA)	0	19	15	21	-	-
18	Buyanjargal (MGL)	6	22	21	27	-	-

Round of 16
3	Demberel (MGL)	6	21	24	23	25	-
19	Shevchenko (UKR)	2	17	23	27	21	-
11	Kliem (GER)	4	27	22	24	25	18
6	Lavrinc (SLO)	6	20	23	25	24	19
7	Jatyan (IND)	6	27	26	27	-	-
10	Şengül (TUR)	0	24	22	26	-	-
18	Buyanjargal (MGL)	0	23	23	25	-	-
2	Wu C (CHN)	6	29	28	27	-	-

Quarterfinals
3	Demberel (MGL)	6	27	27	26	20	26
6	Lavrinc (SLO)	4	23	28	25	26	23
7	Jatyan (IND)	4	28	25	27	24	24
2	Wu C (CHN)	6	23	24	28	27	27

Semifinals
3	Demberel (MGL)	4	29	21	26	29	26
2	Wu C (CHN)	6	27	26	27	27	27

=== Finals ===
Gold medal match
4	Wu Yang (CHN)	1	27	28	27	24	-
2	Wu Chunyan (CHN)	7	27	29	28	28	-
Bronze medal match
1	Elisabetta Mijno (ITA)	6	23	30	27	29	-
3	Selengee Demberel (MGL)	2	24	28	24	22	-
