= Archery at the 2016 Summer Paralympics – Team recurve open =

Mixed team recurve open at the XV Paralympic Games
- Paralympic archery
- Venue: Rio de Janeiro
- Competitors: 32 from 16 nations

Medalists
| 1st place, gold medalist(s) | | Zhao Lixui; Wu Chunyan | China |
| 2nd place, silver medalist(s) | | Ebrahim Ranjbarkivaj; Zahra Nemati | Iran |
| 3rd place, bronze medalist(s) | | Roberto Airoldi; Elisabetta Mijno | Italy |

The Mixed team recurve open event is one of three team events to be held in Archery at the 2016 Summer Paralympics in Rio de Janeiro. It contained sixteen teams of one man and one woman, and took place on Sunday 11 September 2016. The ranking round determining the makeup and seeding of the teams was held on September 10.

Following a ranking round, all sixteen teams entered. the knockout rounds at the first round stages, with no byes. The losing semifinalists play off for the bronze medal.

The event was won by second seeds Zhao Lixui and Wu Chunyan, representing China, who defeated top seeds Ebrahim Ranjbarkivaj and Zahra Nemati of Iran in the gold medal match, the bronze saw fourth seeds Roberto Airoldi and ElisaBetta Mijno of Italy overcome surprise semifinalists Mongolia, who had earlier defeated third seeds Poland.

== Team recurve open ==
=== Ranking round ===
All recurve archers, male and female, take part in the initial ranking rounds, leading to their seedings in the respective individual events. Simultaneously, the highest ranking scores posted by each nation in the men's and women's event respectively are added together to create the ranking for the mixed team recurve event. The archers posting those scores then become their country's designated team in the knockout stages of the team recurve event.

| Rank | Nation | Archers | Score |
|---|---|---|---|
| 1 | Iran (IRI) | Ebrahim Ranjbarkivaj; Zahra Nemati | 1264 |
| 2 | China (CHN) | Zhao Lixui; Wu Chunyan | 1246 |
| 3 | Poland (POL) | Piotr Sawicki; Milena Olszewska | 1240 |
| 4 | Italy (ITA) | Roberto Airoldi; Elisabetta Mijno | 1225 |
| 5 | South Korea (KOR) | Kim Min Su; Lee Hwa Sook | 1224 |
| 6 | Germany (GER) | Maik Szarszewski; Jennifer Hess | 1223 |
| 7 | Thailand (THA) | Hanreuchai Netsiri; Wasana Khuthawisap | 1217 |
| 8 | Great Britain (GBR) | David Phillips; Tania Nadarajah | 1162 |
| 9 | Chinese Taipei (TPE) | Tseng Lung-hui; Lee Yun-hsien | 1161 |
| 10 | Turkey (TUR) | Sadik Savas; Merve Nur Eroglu | 1148 |
| 11 | Mongolia (MGL) | Dambadondog Baatarjav; Oyun-Erdene Buyanjargal | 1146 |
| 12 | Brazil (BRA) | Francisco Cordeiro; Fabíola Dergovics | 1145 |
| 13 | Latvia (LAT) | Gints Jonasts; Ieve Melle | 1133 |
| 14 | Iraq (IRQ) | Jawad Al-Musawi; Zaman Al-Saeda | 1117 |
| 15 | Czech Republic (CZE) | Vaclav Kostal; Marketa Sidkova | 1116 |
| 16 | France (FRA) | Maxime Guerin; Brigitte Duboc | 1110 |

=== Competition bracket ===
Following the ranking round and seeding, the teams were drawn, by rank, in a single elimination tournament, save for the third place match for bronze for the losing semifinalists.

Round of 16
1 | Iran (IRI) | 6
16 | France (FRA) | 0
9 | Chinese Taipei (TPE) | 2
8 | Great Britain (GBR) | 6
5 | South Korea (KOR) | 1
12 | Brazil (BRA) | 5
13 | Latvia (LAT) | 0
4 | Italy (ITA) | 6
3 | Poland (POL) | 6
14 | Iraq (IRQ) | 2
11 | Mongolia (MGL) | 5
6 | Germany (GER) | 3
7 | Thailand (THA) | 5
10 | Turkey (TUR) | 3
15 | Czech Republic (CZE) | 0
2 | China (CHN) | 6

Quarter final
1 | Iran (IRI) | 5
8 | Great Britain (GBR) | 4
12 | Brazil (BRA) | 2
4 | Italy (ITA) | 6
3 | Poland (POL) | 4
11 | Mongolia (MGL) | 5
7 | Thailand (THA) | 0
2 | China (CHN) | 6

Semi final
1 | Iran (IRI) | 6
4 | Italy (ITA) | 0
11 | Mongolia (MGL) | 0
2 | China (CHN) | 6

Medal finals
1 | (silver) Iran (IRI) | 3
2 | (gold) China (CHN) | 5
Third place
4 | (bronze) Italy (ITA) | 5
11 | Mongolia (MGL) | 1
