= Archery at the 2024 Summer Paralympics =

Archery at the XVII Paralympic Games
- Pictogram for Para Archery
- Venue: Esplanade des Invalides
- Dates: 29 August 2024 – 5 September 2024
- Competitors: 137 from 47 nations

Archery at the 2024 Summer Paralympics was held at Esplanade des Invalides in Paris. It consisted of nine events (3 men, 3 women, 3 mixed open teams). It was expected that there would be 140 archer slots.

== Medal table ==
The final archery medal table at the conclusion of the competition events was as follows:

* Host nation (France)

| Rank | NPC | Gold | Silver | Bronze | Total |
|---|---|---|---|---|---|
| 1 | China | 3 | 3 | 2 | 8 |
| 2 | United States | 2 | 0 | 0 | 2 |
| 3 | Turkey | 1 | 1 | 0 | 2 |
| 4 | Italy | 1 | 0 | 2 | 3 |
| 5 | Great Britain | 1 | 0 | 1 | 2 |
| 5 | India | 1 | 0 | 1 | 2 |
| 7 | Czech Republic | 0 | 2 | 1 | 3 |
| 7 | Iran | 0 | 2 | 1 | 3 |
| 9 | Poland | 0 | 1 | 0 | 1 |
| 10 | Slovenia | 0 | 0 | 1 | 1 |
| Totals (10 entries) | | 9 | 9 | 9 | 27 |

== Medal summary ==
| Event | Class | Gold | Silver | Bronze |
|---|---|---|---|---|
| Men's individual | W1 | Jason Tabansky; United States | Han Guifei; China | Zhang Tianxin; China |
| Women's individual | W1 | Chen Minyi; China | Šárka Musilová; Czech Republic | Tereza Brandtlová; Czech Republic |
| Mixed team | W1 | China; Chen Minyi; Zhang Tianxin | Czech Republic; David Drahonínský; Šárka Musilová | Italy; Daila Dameno; Paolo Tonon |
| Men's individual compound | Open | Matt Stutzman; United States | Ai Xinliang; China | He Zihao; China |
| Women's individual compound | Open | Öznur Cüre; Turkey | Fatemeh Hemmati; Iran | Jodie Grinham; Great Britain |
| Mixed team compound | Open | Great Britain; Jodie Grinham; Nathan MacQueen | Iran; Fatemeh Hemmati; Hadi Nori | India; Rakesh Kumar; Sheetal Devi |
| Men's individual recurve | Open | Harvinder Singh; India | Łukasz Ciszek; Poland | Mohammad Reza Ameri; Iran |
| Women's individual recurve | Open | Wu Chunyan; China | Wu Yang; China | Elisabetta Mijno; Italy |
| Mixed team recurve | Open | Italy; Elisabetta Mijno; Stefano Travisani | Turkey; Merve Nur Eroğlu; Sadık Savaş | Slovenia; Živa Lavrinc; Dejan Fabčič |

== Qualification ==
A total of 140 archer slots will be achieved.

| Means of qualification | Date | Venue | Individual berths | Mixed team berths | Qualified |
|---|---|---|---|---|---|
| 2023 World Para Archery Championships | 17–23 July 2023 | (Czech Republic) Plzeň | 54 | 12 | |
| 2023 European Para Championships | 10–20 August 2023 | (Netherlands) Rotterdam | 10 | —N/a | |
| 2023 Parapan American Games | 17–26 November 2023 | (Chile) Santiago | 10 | —N/a | |
| 2023 Asian Para Archery Championships | 19–28 November 2023 | (Thailand) Bangkok | 10 | —N/a | |
| 2024 Africa–Oceania Qualification Tournament | 4 March 2024 | (United Arab Emirates) Dubai | 6 | —N/a | |
| 2024 World Qualification Tournament | 5 March 2024 | (United Arab Emirates) Dubai | 12 | —N/a | |
| Bipartite Commission Invitation | 2 July 2024 | | 8 | —N/a | |
| Host Country Allocation | 13 September 2017 | (Peru) Lima | 3 | —N/a | France (FRA) |
| Total | | | 140 | | |

== See also ==
- Archery at the 2024 Summer Olympics
