= Yavuz Papağan =

Turkish Paralympic archer (born 1987)

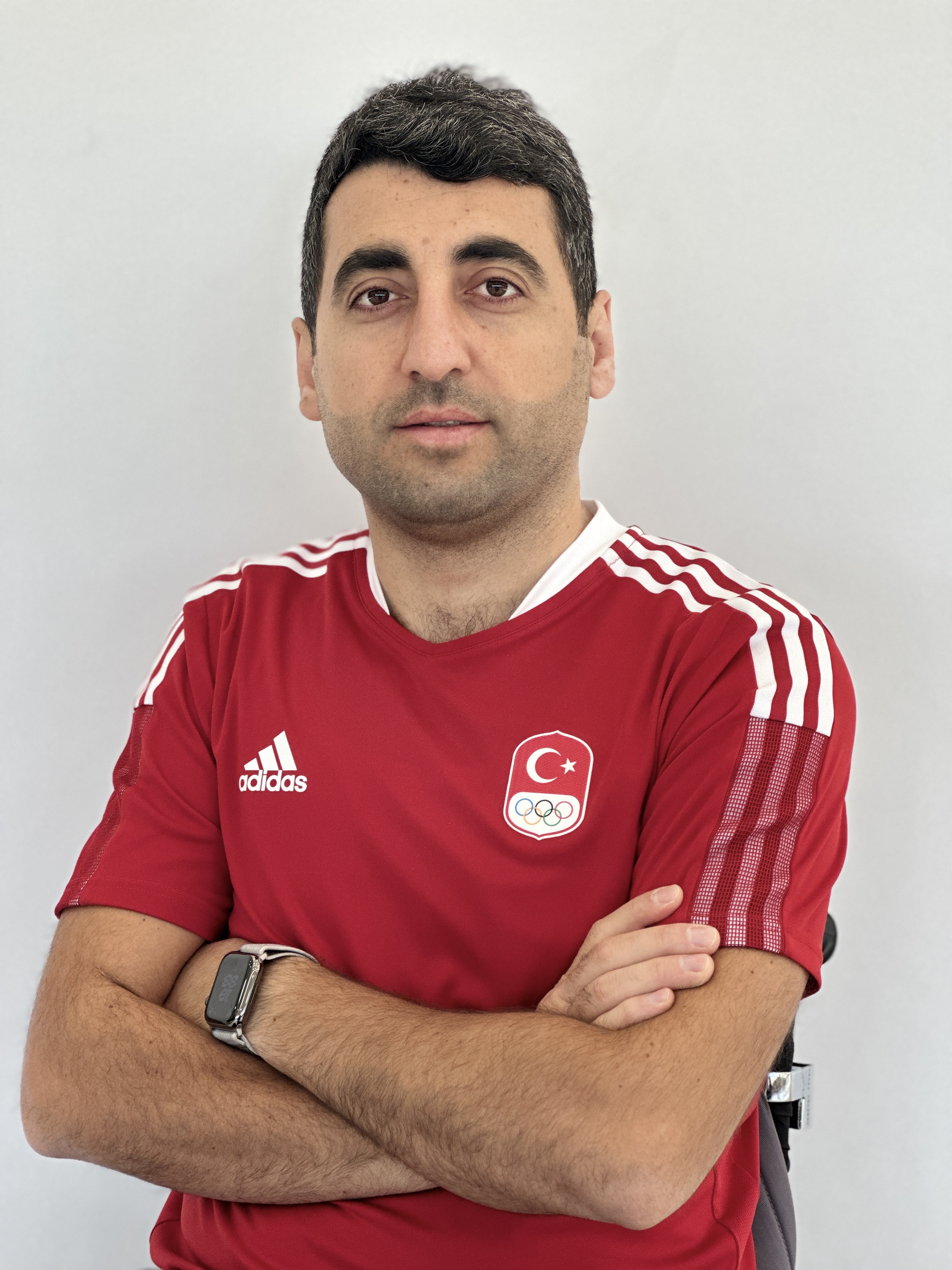
- Yavuz Papağan )2023)

Personal information
- Nationality: Turkish
- Born: 1 July 1987 (age 39) Muş, Turkey

Sport
- Country: Turkey
- Sport: Paralympic archery
- Event: Recurve bow W2
- Club: Istanbul BBSK
Medal record
Men's archery Recurve bow
Representing Turkey
World Championship
Gold medal – first place	2023 Plzeň	Open doubles
Islamic Solidarity Games
Gold medal – first place	2021 Konya	Team
Gold medal – first place	2021 Konya	Mixed team
European Para Championships
Silver medal – second place	2023 Kop van Zuid	Open team
European Championships
Bronze medal – third place	2024 Rome	Open team
Gold medal – first place	2022 Rome	Open doubles
Silver medal – second place	2022 Rome	Open Individual

Yavuz Papağan (born 1 July 1987) is a Turkish para-archer. He is a World and European champion, competing in the men's recurve bow event of disability class W2.

== Sport career ==
Papağan started archery during his time at the Turkish Armed Forces Rehabilitaion Center in Ankara. In 2017, he became an active para-archer. He competes in the Recurve Open event of wheelchair disability class W2. He is a member of Istanbul BB SK.

=== 2022 ===
Papağan competed at the 2022 World Para Archery Championships in Dubai, United Arab Emirates. In the Open individual event, he ranked ninth, and in the Open team event with Sadık Savaş reached the fourth place.

At the 2022 European Para-Archery Championships in Rome, Italy, Papağan took the silver medal in the Open Individual event, and won the gold medal with teammate Sadık Savaş in the Open team event.

Papağan won the gold medal with Merve Nur Eroğlu in the Mixed team event, and another gold medal with Sadık Savaş in the men's team event at the 2021 Islamic Solidarity Games in Konya, Turkey, which were held one year later due to COVID-19 pandemic.

=== 2023 ===
He and Sadık Savaş captured the gold medal in the Open doubles event at the 2023 World Para Archery Championships in Plzeň, Czech Republic. He ranked ninth in the Open individual event, and sixth in the Open team event. The same year, he and Sadık Savaş won the silver medal in the Open team event at the European Para Championships in Kop van Zuid, Netherlands.

=== 2024 ===
He and his teammate Sadık Savaş defeated the Ukrainian team in the Recurve men open team event, and won the bronze medal at the 2024 European Para-Archery Championships in Rome, Italy.

He received a quota to represent Turkey at the 2024 Summer Paralympics in Paris, France.

== Personal life ==
Yavuz Papağan was born in Muş, Turkey on 1 July 1987.

On 18 September 2012, terrorists carried out an attack on a military convoy on the Bingöl-Muş highway in southeastern Turkey. Nine soldiers died and 70 servicemen were wounded in the attack. Papağan, who was performing compulsory military service as a Gendarmerie Commando Private stationed im Tunceli, was among the wounded personnel when a bullet hit his spinal cord. He lost the ability to walk. He was treated at the Gülhane Military Medical Academy (GATA) and then at the Turkish Armed Forces Rehabilitation Center in Ankara. In 2015, he was decorated with the "State Medal of Honor" and its certificate.

On 23 March 2015, Papağan married to Semiha Kızılboğa in Muş. He is father of a child.

He is a student of Sport coaching in the Faculty of Sports science at Muş Alparslan University.
