= Poland at the 2024 Summer Paralympics =

- Flag of Poland
- IPC code: POL
- NPC: Polish Paralympic Committee
- Website: www.paralympic.org.pl

in Paris, France August 28, 2024 – September 8, 2024
- Competitors: 53 in 12 sports
- Flag bearers: Lucyna Kornobys; Maciej Lepiato
- Medals Ranked 16th: Gold 8 Silver 6 Bronze 9 Total 23

Summer Paralympics appearances (overview)
- 1972; 1976; 1980; 1984; 1988; 1992; 1996; 2000; 2004; 2008; 2012; 2016; 2020; 2024

Poland competed at the 2024 Summer Paralympics in Paris, France, from 28 August to 8 September.

== Medalists ==
Medal	Name	Sport	Event	Date
Gold	Kamil Otowski	Swimming	Men's 100m backstroke S1	29 August
Gold	Kamil Otowski	Swimming	Men's 50m backstroke S1	31 August
Gold	Patryk Chojnowski; Piotr Grudzień	Table tennis	Men's doubles MD18	1 September
Gold	Patryk Chojnowski	Table tennis	Men's singles MS10	4 September
Gold	Rafał Czuper	Table tennis	Men's singles MS2	5 September
Gold	Barbara Bieganowska-Zając	Athletics	Women's 1500m T20	6 September
Gold	Karolina Kucharczyk	Athletics	Women's long jump T20	6 September
Gold	Karolina Pęk	Table tennis	Women's singles WS9	7 September
Silver	Lucyna Kornobys	Athletics	Women's shot put F34	3 September
Silver	Michał Dąbrowski	Wheelchair fencing	Men's sabre B	3 September
Silver	Kinga Dróżdż	Wheelchair fencing	Women's sabre A	3 September
Silver	Łukasz Ciszek	Archery	Men's individual recurve open	4 September
Silver	Natalia Partyka	Table tennis	Women's singles WS10	4 September
Silver	Renata Śliwińska	Athletics	Women's shot put F40	7 September
Bronze	Lech Stoltman	Athletics	Men's shot put F55	30 August
Bronze	Karolina Pęk; Piotr Grudzień	Table tennis	Mixed doubles XD17	31 August
Bronze	Natalia Partyka; Karolina Pęk	Table tennis	Women's doubles WD20	31 August
Bronze	Marek Dobrowolski	Shooting	Men's 50m rifle three positions	3 September
Bronze	Zbigniew Maciejewski	Cycling	Men's road time trial C1	4 September
Bronze	Dorota Bucław	Table tennis	Women's singles WS1-2	5 September
Bronze	Rafał Wilk	Cycling	Men's road race MH4	5 September
Bronze	Maciej Lepiato	Athletics	Men's high jump T64	6 September
Bronze	Michał Dąbrowski	Wheelchair fencing	Men's épée B	6 September

== Competitors ==
The following is the list of number of competitors in the Games.

Sport	Men	Women	Total
Archery	1	2	3
Athletics	10	8	18
Badminton	1	1	2
Boccia	1	1	2
Cycling	1	1	2
Equestrian	0	1	1
Paracanoeing	1	2	3
Rowing	1	1	2
Shooting	1	1	4
Swimming	2	1	3
Table tennis	6	5	11
Taekwondo	0	1	1
Total	25	24	49

== Archery ==
Poland secured three quota places. Two of the quotas being secured the in recurve event by virtue of their result at the 2023 World Para Archery Championships in Plzeň, Czech Republic, meanwhile the other being secured through 2023 European Para Championships in Rotterdam, Netherlands.

Athlete	Event	Ranking Round		Round of 32	Round of 16	Quarterfinals	Semifinals	Finals	
Athlete	Event	Score	Seed	Opposition Score	Opposition Score	Opposition Score	Opposition Score	Opposition Score	Rank
Łukasz Ciszek	Men's individual recurve	642	6 Q	White (USA); W 26-27	Ueyama (JPN); W 27-29	Zhao (CHN); W 27-28	Kenton-Smith (AUS); W 25-28	Singh (IND); L 27-29	2nd place, silver medalist(s)
Kseniya Markitantova	Women's individual compound	676	13	Akter (BAN); W 138*-138	Grinham (GBR); L 141-142	Did not advance			
Milena Olszewska	Women's individual recurve	580	9	Bye	Eroğlu (TUR); W 24-25	Mijno (ITA); L 23-27	Did not advance		
Łukasz Ciszek; Milena Olszewska	Mixed team recurve	1222	4	—N/a	France; W6-0	India; L0-6	Did not advance		

== Athletics ==
Polish track and field athletes achieved quota places for the following events based on their results at the 2023 World Championships, 2024 World Championships, or through high performance allocation, as long as they meet the minimum entry standard (MES).

Key

- Note–Ranks given for track events are within the athlete's heat only
- Q = Qualified for the next round
- q = Qualified for the next round as a fastest loser or, in field events, by position without achieving the qualifying target
- DQ = Disqualified
- PR = Paralympic Record
- AR = Area (or continental) Record
- NR = National Record
- SB = Season's Best
- N/A = Round not applicable for the event
- Bye = Athlete not required to compete in round

Track & road events

Athlete	Event	Heat		Semifinal		Final	
Athlete	Event	Result	Rank	Result	Rank	Result	Rank
Michal Derus	Men's 100 m T47	10.92	4	Did not advance			
Michał Kotkowski	Men's 400 m T37	52.45	6 Q	—N/a		51.83	5
Aleksander Kossakowski	Men's 1500 m T11	4:18.19	6 q	—N/a		4:18.86	6
Ingrid Renecka	Women's 100 m T35	—N/a				15.29	5
Jagoda Kibil	Women's 100 m T35	—N/a				15.54	6
Joanna Mazur	Women's 400 m T11	1:04.01	3 q	1:03.93	4	Did not advance	
Joanna Mazur	Women's 1500 m T11	4:56.30	6 q	—N/a		4:59.71	6
Barbara Bieganowska-Zając	Women's 1500 m T20	—N/a				4:26.06	1st place, gold medalist(s)

Field events
Men

Athlete	Event	Final	
Athlete	Event	Distance	Position
Łukasz Mamczarz	High jump T63	1.77	7
Maciej Lepiato	High jump T64	2.03	4
Jakub Miroslaw	Shot put F37	13.12	9
Bartosz Gorczak	Shot put F53	8.43 PB	4
Lech Stoltman	Shot put F55	11.90	3rd place, bronze medalist(s)
Damian Ligeza	Shot put F55	11.18	8
Rafal Rocki	Discus throw F52	17.92	5
Robert Jachimowicz	Discus throw F52	17.69	6

Women

Athlete	Event	Final	
Athlete	Event	Distance	Position
Karolina Kucharczyk	Long jump T20	5.82	1st place, gold medalist(s)
Joanna Oleksiuk	Shot put F33	6.40	4
Lucyna Kornobys	Shot put F34	8.60	2nd place, silver medalist(s)
Renata Śliwińska	Shot put F40	8.75	1st place, gold medalist(s)
Roza Kozakowska	Club throw F32	N/A	DQ R6.16.1
Faustyna Kotłowska	Discus throw F64	39.89	4

== Badminton ==
Poland has qualified two para badminton players for the following events, through the release of BWF para-badminton Race to Paris Paralympic Ranking.

Athlete	Event	Group Stage				Quarterfinal	Semifinal	Final / BM
Athlete	Event	Opposition Score	Opposition Score	Opposition Score	Rank	Opposition Score	Opposition Score	Rank
Bartłomiej Mróz	Men's singles SU5	Cheah Liek Hou (MAS); L (10–21, 6–21)	Suryo Nugroho (INA); L (13-21, 10-21)	Méril Loquette (FRA); L (21-15, 19-21, 14-21)	4	Did not advance		
Oliwia Szmigiel	Women's singles SH6	Hernández (PER); W (21-13, 21-8)	Rachel Choong (GBR); L (17-21, 21-10, 21-16)	Bye	3 Q	Nithya Sre Sivan (IND); L (4-21, 7-21)	Did not advance	

== Boccia ==
Poland entered two athletes, to compete in the BC3 event. Damian Iskrzycki and Edyta Owczarz qualified for the games after nominated as one of the two highest ranked individuals, not yet qualified, through the release of final world ranking for Paris 2024.

Athlete	Event	Pool matches						Quarterfinals	Semifinals	Final / BM	
Athlete	Event	Opposition Score	Opposition Score	Opposition Score	Opposition Score	Opposition Score	Rank	Opposition Score	Opposition Score	Opposition Score	Rank
Damian Iskrzycki	Men's individual BC3	Tse (HKG); W 6-4	Romero (ARG); W 7-1	Peska (CZE); W 4-2	—N/a		1 Q	Wilson (GBR); W 4-1	Jeong (KOR); L 1-6	Polychronidis (GRE); L 5-4	4
Edyta Owczarz	Women's individual BC3	Kla-Ham (THA); W 3-2	Cermakova (CZE); W 6-4	Heckel (FRA); W 9-2	—N/a		1 Q	Calado (BRA); L 1-5	Did not advance		
Damian Iskrzycki; Edyta Owczarz	Mixed pairs BC3					—N/a					

== Cycling ==
Poland entered two para-cyclists (one in each gender) after finished the top eligible nation's at the 2022 UCI Nation's ranking allocation ranking.

=== Track ===
Men

Athlete	Event	Qualification		Final	
Athlete	Event	Result	Rank	Result	Rank
Karol Kopicz	Men's time trial B				
Karol Kopicz	Men's pursuit B	4:19.202	8	Did not advance	

== Equestrian ==
Poland entered one para-equestrian into the Paralympic equestrian competition, by virtue of the nations individual final world para dressage rankings.

Individual

Athlete	Horse	Event	Total	
Athlete	Horse	Event	Score	Rank
Monika Bartys	Caspar	Individual championship test grade IV		
Monika Bartys	Caspar	Individual freestyle test grade IV		

== Paracanoeing ==
Poland earned quota places for the following events through the 2023 ICF Canoe Sprint World Championships in Duisburg, Germany; and 2024 ICF Canoe Sprint World Championships in Szeged, Hungary.

Athlete	Event	Heats		Semifinal		Final	
Athlete	Event	Time	Rank	Time	Rank	Time	Rank
	Men's KL3						
	Women's KL3						
	Women's VL3						

== Rowing ==
Polish rowers qualified boats in each of the following classes at the 2023 World Rowing Championships in Belgrade, Serbia.

Athlete	Event	Heats		Repechage		Final	
Athlete	Event	Time	Rank	Time	Rank	Time	Rank
Michal Grzegorz Gadowski; Jolanda Majka	PR2 mixed double sculls	8:07.76	2 FA				

Qualification Legend: FA=Final A (medal); FB=Final B (non-medal); R=Repechage

== Shooting ==
Poland entered four para-shooter's after achieved quota places for the following events by virtue of their best finishes at the 2022, 2023 and 2024 world cup, 2022 World Championships, 2023 World Championships, 2023 European Para Championships and 2024 European Championships, as long as they obtained a minimum qualifying score (MQS) by May 31, 2020.

Men

Athlete	Event	Qualification		Final	
Athlete	Event	Points	Rank	Points	Rank
Marek Dobrowolski	R7 – 50 m rifle 3 positions SH1				

Women

Athlete	Event	Qualification		Final	
Athlete	Event	Points	Rank	Points	Rank
Emilia Trześniowska	R2 – 10 m air rifle standing SH1				

Mixed

Athlete	Event	Qualification		Final	
Athlete	Event	Points	Rank	Points	Rank
Szymon Sowiński	P3 – 25 m pistol SH1				
Emilia Babska	R3 – 10 m air rifle prone SH1				

== Swimming ==
Poland secured three quotas at the 2023 World Para Swimming Championships after finishing in the top two places in Paralympic class disciplines.

Athlete	Event	Heats		Final	
Athlete	Event	Result	Rank	Result	Rank
Kamil Otowski	Men's 100 m backstroke S1	—N/a		2:17.85	1st place, gold medalist(s)
	Men's 200 m freestyle S2				
Jacek Czech	Men's 100 m backstroke S2	2:08.06	4 Q		
	Women's 400 m freestyle S10				

== Table tennis ==
Poland entered eleven athletes for the Paralympic games. Rafał Czuper, Patryk Chojnowski, Karolina Pęk and Natalia Partyka qualified for the games by virtue of their gold medal results, in their respective class, through the 2023 European Para Championships held in Sheffield, Great Britain; meanwhile, the other athletes qualified through the allocations of ITTF final world ranking.

Men

Athlete	Event	Group Stage				Quarterfinals	Semifinals	Final / BM	
Athlete	Event	Opposition Result	Opposition Result	Opposition Result	Rank	Opposition Result	Opposition Result	Opposition Result	Rank
Rafał Czuper	Individual C2								
Tomasz Jakimczuk	Individual C2								
Maciej Nalepka	Individual C3								
Piotr Grudzień	Individual C8								
Patryk Chojnowski	Individual C10								
Igor Misztal	Individual C10								

Women

Athlete	Event	Group Stage				Quarterfinals	Semifinals	Final / BM	
Athlete	Event	Opposition Result	Opposition Result	Opposition Result	Rank	Opposition Result	Opposition Result	Opposition Result	Rank
Dorota Bucław	Individual C1–2								
Katarzyna Marszał	Individual C6								
Karolina Pęk	Individual C9								
Natalia Partyka	Individual C10								
Krystyna Łysiak	Individual C11								

== Taekwondo ==
Poland entered one athletes to compete at the Paralympics competition. Patrycja Zewar qualified for Paris 2024, following the triumph of his gold medal results in women's 65 kg classes, at the 2024 European Qualification Tournament in Sofia, Bulgaria.

Athlete	Event	First round	Quarterfinals	Semifinals	Repechage 1	Repechage 2	Final / BM	
Athlete	Event	Opposition Result	Opposition Result	Opposition Result	Opposition Result	Opposition Result	Opposition Result	Rank
Patrycja Zewar	Women's –65 kg	Gkentzou (GRE); L 0-22	Did not advance					

== See also ==
- Poland at the 2024 Summer Olympics
- Poland at the Paralympics
