= Archery at the 2024 Summer Paralympics – Qualification =

Qualification for archery at the 2024 Summer Paralympics begins on 1 July 2023 to 1 July 2024.

== Timeline ==
Competition	Date	Venue	Berths
2023 World Para Archery Championships	17–23 July 2023	(Czech Republic) Pilsen	54 individual berths 32 male 22 female
2023 European Para Championships	10–20 August 2023	(Netherlands) Rotterdam	10 individual berths 5 male 5 female
2023 Asian Para Championships	16–25 November 2023	(Thailand) Bangkok	10 individual berths 5 male 5 female
2023 Parapan American Games	17–26 November 2023	(Chile) Santiago	10 individual berths 5 male 5 female
2024 Africa-Oceania Qualification Tournament	2024	(United Arab Emirates) Dubai	6 individual berths 3 male 3 female
2024 World Qualification Tournament	2024	(United Arab Emirates) Dubai	12 individual berths 6 male 6 female
Host country allocation	13 September 2017	(Peru) Lima	6 individual berths 3 male 3 female
Bipartite Commission Invitation	2024	—	4 individual berths 2 male 2 female
Total			140

== Quotas ==
Qualification slots are allocated to the NPC, not to an individual athlete. However, bipartite commissions are allocated to the athlete, not to the NPC.

- An NPC can enter a maximum of two eligible archers per individual event. Maximum total of six male and six female slots.
- An NPC automatically enters a maximum of one team, composed of one male and one female archer. The team members are selected from the archers who compete in their respective individual event.

=== Men ===
Competition	Venue	Individual W1	Individual Compound Open	Individual Recurve Open
Host country	—	France	France	—
2023 World Championships; Individual allocation	(Czech Republic) Pilsen	Australia; Turkey	Australia; Belgium; China; Costa Rica; France; India; Indonesia; Iran; Iran; Iraq; Italy; Slovakia; Spain; Ukraine; United States; United States	China; France; India; Indonesia; Indonesia; Mexico; Poland; Slovakia; South Korea; Thailand; Turkey; Turkey; Ukraine; United States
2023 World Championships; Mixed team allocation	(Czech Republic) Pilsen	China; Czech Republic; Italy; South Korea	Brazil; China; Great Britain; India	China; Iran; Italy; Japan
2023 European Championships	(Netherlands) Rotterdam	Hungary	Finland; Slovakia	Czech Republic; Latvia
2023 Asian Championships	(Thailand) Bangkok	China	Japan; Thailand	Chinese Taipei; Malaysia
2023 Parapan American Games	(Chile) Santiago	Brazil	Canada; Mexico	United States; Colombia
2024 Africa-Oceania Qualification Tournament	(United Arab Emirates) Dubai	South Africa	Australia	Australia
2024 World Qualification Tournament	(United Arab Emirates) Dubai	Turkey; Finland	Malaysia; Austria	Brazil; Iran
Bipartite Commission Invitation	—	—	Hong Kong; Senegal	Azerbaijan; Bangladesh; Guatemala

=== Women ===
Competition	Venue	Individual W1	Individual Compound	Individual Recurve
Host country	—	France	France	France
2023 World Championships; Individual allocation	(Czech Republic) Pilsen	China; Czech Republic	Australia; China; France; Great Britain; India; Iran; Iran; Iraq; Singapore; South Korea; Turkey; Turkey	China; India; Italy; Poland; Slovenia; Thailand; Turkey; Turkey
2023 World Championships; Mixed team allocation	(Czech Republic) Pilsen	China; Czech Republic; Italy; South Korea	Brazil; China; Great Britain; India	China; Iran; Italy; Japan
2023 European Championships	(Netherlands) Rotterdam	Great Britain	Italy; Poland	Germany; Ukraine
2023 Asian Championships	(Thailand) Bangkok	—	Indonesia; Malaysia	Mongolia; South Korea
2023 Parapan American Games	(Chile) Santiago	United States	Costa Rica; Chile	Peru; Colombia
2024 Africa-Oceania Qualification Tournament	(United Arab Emirates) Dubai	—	Australia	Australia
2024 World Qualification Tournament	(United Arab Emirates) Dubai	Italy; Turkey	Italy; Bangladesh	Mongolia; Indonesia
Bipartite Commission Invitation	—	—	Ecuador; Ireland; Philippines	Cuba; Greece

=== Mixed teams ===
Competition	Venue	Mixed team W1	Mixed team Compound	Mixed team Recurve
2023 World Championships	(Czech Republic) Pilsen	China; Czech Republic; Italy; South Korea	Brazil; China; Great Britain; India	China; Iran; Italy; Japan

== See also ==
- Archery at the 2024 Summer Olympics – Qualification
