= Archery at the 2024 Summer Paralympics – Mixed team recurve =

Mixed team recurve open at the XVII Paralympic Games
- Paralympic archery
- Venue: Les Invalides
- Dates: 29 August 2024 (ranking round); 5 September 2024 (match play)
- Competitors: 28 from 14 nations
- Teams: 14

Medalists
1st place, gold medalist(s)		Elisabetta Mijno; Stefano Travisani	Italy
2nd place, silver medalist(s)		Merve Nur Eroglu; Sadik Savas	Turkey
3rd place, bronze medalist(s)		Dejan Fabcic; Ziva Lavrinc	Slovenia

The Mixed team recurve open event is one of three team events to be held in Archery at the 2024 Summer Paralympics at Les Invalides in Paris. It contained fourteen teams of one man and one woman.

Following a ranking round, all fourteen teams entered. the knockout rounds at the first round stages, with the top two progressing directly to the quarterfinals. The losing semifinalists play off for the bronze medal.

== Ranking round ==
The ranking round was held on 29 August 2024.

Rank	NPC	Name	Scores		Notes
Rank	NPC	Name	Individual	Team	Notes
1	Italy	Elisabetta Mijno	641	1268	
1	Italy	Stefano Travisani	627	1268	
2	China	Chunyan Wu	630	1266	
2	China	Jun Gan	636	1266	
3	Turkey	Merve Nur Eroglu	581	1227	
3	Turkey	Sadik Savas	646	1227	
4	Poland	Milena Olszewska	580	1222	
4	Poland	Lukasz Ciszek	642	1222	
5	India	Pooja	585	1222	
5	India	Harvinder Singh	637	1222	
6	Iran	Ghahderijani Somayeh Rahimi	574	1219	
6	Iran	Ameri Mohammad Reza Arab	645	1219	
7	Slovenia	Ziva Lavrinc	588	1203	
7	Slovenia	Dejan Fabcic	615	1203	
8	Thailand	Phattharaphon Pattawaeo	571	1195	
8	Thailand	Hanreuchai Netsiri	624	1195	
9	Indonesia	Wahyu Retno Wulandari	526	1173	
9	Indonesia	Kholidin	647	1173	
10	Colombia	María Daza	558	1169	
10	Colombia	Héctor Ramírez	611	1169	
11	South Korea	Gyeongsuk Jang	510	1157	
11	South Korea	Geonhwi Kwak	647	1157	
12	Australia	Amanda Jennings	531	1127	
12	Australia	Taymon Kenton-Smith	596	1127	
13	France	Aziza Benhami	466	1118	
13	France	Guillaume Toucoullet	652	1118	
14	Ukraine	Anna-Viktoriia Shevchenko	514	1118	
14	Ukraine	Ruslan Tsymbaliuk	604	1118	

== Matchplay ==
Matchplay elimination was played on 5 September 2024.

Round of 16
5 September 2024, Les Invalides, Paris
Indonesia	6
Thailand	2
5 September 2024, Les Invalides, Paris
India	5
Australia	4
5 September 2024, Les Invalides, Paris
Poland	6
France	0
5 September 2024, Les Invalides, Paris
Turkey	5
Ukraine	3
5 September 2024, Les Invalides, Paris
South Korea	4
Iran	5
5 September 2024, Les Invalides, Paris
Slovenia	6
Colombia	2

Quarter-finals
5 September 2024, Les Invalides, Paris
Italy	5
Indonesia	3
5 September 2024, Les Invalides, Paris
India	6
Poland	0
5 September 2024, Les Invalides, Paris
Turkey	6
Iran	2
5 September 2024, Les Invalides, Paris
China	4
Slovenia	5

Semi-finals
5 September 2024, Les Invalides, Paris
Italy	6
India	2
5 September 2024, Les Invalides, Paris
Turkey	5
Slovenia	4

Final
5 September 2024, Les Invalides, Paris
Italy	6
Turkey	2
Bronze final
5 September 2024, Les Invalides, Paris
India	4
Slovenia	5
