= Archery at the 2023 European Para Championships =

- Location: Kop van Zuid, Netherlands
- Start date: 16 August
- End date: 20 August

Archery at the 2023 European Para Championships will be held between 16 and 20 August 2023.

The championships offers as a qualifier for the 2024 Summer Paralympics in each of the men's and women's individual compound and recurve open events (except visually impaired events) will be given one qualification spot.

== Medal table ==
* Host nation (Netherlands)

Rank	Nation	Gold	Silver	Bronze	Total
1	Turkey	6	4	2	12
2	Italy	5	5	2	12
3	Great Britain	3	0	2	5
4	Belgium	1	1	0	2
4	France	1	1	0	2
6	Spain	0	2	0	2
7	Poland	0	1	1	2
8	Cyprus	0	1	0	1
9	Andorra	0	0	1	1
9	Finland	0	0	1	1
9	Hungary	0	0	1	1
9	Latvia	0	0	1	1
9	Ukraine	0	0	1	1
Totals (13 entries)		16	15	12	43

== Medalists ==
=== Individual events ===
Event	Gold	Silver	Bronze
Men's individual recurve open	Sadık Savaş; Turkey	Guillaume Toucoullet; France	Gints Jonasts; Latvia
Men's individual compound open	Nathan MacQueen; Great Britain	Fernando Galé Montorio; Spain	Jere Forsberg; Finland
Men's individual W1	Maurizio Panella; Italy	Bahattin Hekimoğlu; Turkey	Tamás Gáspár; Hungary
Women's individual recurve open	Elisabetta Mijno; Italy	Yağmur Şengül; Turkey	Milena Olszewska; Poland
Women's individual compound open	Sevgi Yorulmaz; Turkey	Kseniya Markitantova; Poland	Öznur Cüre; Turkey
Visually impaired open 1	Ruben Vanhollebeke; Belgium	Christos Misos; Cyprus	Jordi Casellas Albiol; Andorra
Visually impaired open 2/3	Daniele Piran; Italy	Kathleen Meurrens; Belgium	Giovanni Maria Vaccaro; Italy

=== Team events ===
Event	Gold	Silver	Bronze
Men's team recurve open	Great Britain; David Phillips; Cameron Rodigan	Turkey; Sadık Savaş; Yavuz Papağan	Italy; Stefano Travisani; Giuseppe Verzini
Men's team compound open	France; Thierry Joussaume; Maxime Guérin	Spain; Fernando Galé Montorio; Adrián Martínez Torre	Netherlands; Roy Klaassen; Mark de Gier
Men's team W1	Turkey; Bahattin Hekimoğlu; Yiğit Caner Aydın	Italy; Paolo Tonon; Maurizio Panella	None awarded
Women's team recurve open	Turkey; Merve Nur Eroglu; Yağmur Şengül	Italy; Elisabetta Mijno; Veronica Floreno	None awarded
Women's team compound open	Turkey; Sevgi Yorulmaz; Öznur Cüre	Italy; Eleonora Sarti; Maria Andrea Virgilio	Great Britain; Jodie Grinham; Jessica Stretton
Women's team W1	Italy; Asia Pellizzari; Daila Dameno	None awarded	None awarded
Mixed team recurve open	Turkey; Sadık Savaş; Yağmur Şengül	Italy; Elisabetta Mijno; Stefano Travisani	Ukraine; Ruslan Tsymbaliuk; Anna-Viktoriia Shevchenko
Mixed team compound open	Great Britain; Nathan MacQueen; Phoebe Paterson Pine	Italy; Eleonora Sarti; Matteo Bonacina	Turkey; Murat Turan; Öznur Cüre
Mixed team W1	Italy; Asia Pellizzari; Paolo Tonon	Turkey; Bahattin Hekimoğlu; Nil Mısır	Great Britain; Martin Saych; Victoria Kingstone

== See also ==
- Archery at the 2023 European Games
