= Christopher Davis (archery) =

Australian Paralympic archer

Personal information
- Nationality: Australia

Sport
- Sport: Archery
- Disability class: ARW1
- Club: Mount Petrie Bowmen
Medal record
Men's Archery
Representing Australia
World Para Archery Championship
Bronze medal – third place	2023 Plzeň	Men's W1

Christopher Davis is an Australian Paralympic archer. In 2023, he won the gold medal in Men's W1 at the 2023 World Para Archery Championships. He won Australia's first ever gold medal at World Para Archery Championships.

== Personal ==
Davis at the age of five caught a virus that led to him being intensive care and this led to him losing strength in his limbs. He has worked for Queensland Health as a social worker for twenty years. He is married to Donna, an ultramarathoner.

== Archery ==
Davis is classified as a W1 archer and competes in the most impaired Paralympic event. He decided to pursue archer later in life after witnessing Matt Stutzman, an armless archer compete at the Paralympics. He took up archery in 2019. Davis shoots his compound bow with a mouthtab, biting down on the material attached to the string and pushing the bow away from him to build tension. Davis finished seventh in the Men's W1 at the 2022 World Para Archery Championships, his first major international event. At the age of 51, he won the gold medal in Men's W1 at the 2023 World Para Archery Championships. In the final he defeated Bahattin Hekimoglu 131 to 127.

He is a scholarship athlete at the Queensland Academy of Sport (QAS).
