= Archery at the 2024 Summer Paralympics – Mixed team W1 =

Mixed team W1 at the XVII Paralympic Games
- Paralympic Archery
- Venue: Esplanade des Invalides, Paris
- Dates: 29 August 2024 (ranking round); 2 September 2024 (match play)
- Competitors: 14 from 7 nations
- Teams: 7

Medalists
1st place, gold medalist(s)		Zhang Tianxin; Chen Minyi	China
2nd place, silver medalist(s)		David Drahonínský; Sarka Musilova	Czech Republic
3rd place, bronze medalist(s)		Paolo Tonon; Daila Dameno	Italy

The mixed team W1 is one of three team events held at the 2024 Summer Paralympics in Paris, France. It contain seven teams of one man and one woman. The ranking round will be held on 29 August.

Following a ranking round, the teams ranked 2nd to 7th entered the knockout rounds at the quarterfinal stages, with the highest seeded team entering in the semi-final round. The losing semifinalists played off for the bronze medal. Knockouts were decided on an aggregate score basis, with each archer shooting 8 arrows apiece.

== Record ==
Records are:

144 Arrows Ranking Round
World record	China	1326	Plzeň, Czech Republic	19 July 2023
Paralympic record	China	1290	Tokyo, Japan	27 August 2021

16 Arrows Match
World record	Great Britain	152	Nové Město nad Metují, Czech Republic	11 July 2015
Paralympic record	Great Britain	144	Rio de Janeiro, Brazil	17 September 2016

== Result ==
=== Ranking round ===
Rank	Nation	Score	10s	Xs	Notes
1	China	1324	58	26	PR Q
1	Zhang Tianxin	674	33	17	PR Q
1	Chen Minyi	650	25	9	PR Q
2	Czech Republic	1316	54	19	q
2	David Drahonínský	657	27	9	q
2	Sarka Musilova	659	27	10	q
3	Italy	1261	41	12	q
3	Paolo Tonon	652	24	10	q
3	Daila Dameno	609	17	2	q
4	South Korea	1236	23	4	q
4	Park Hong-jo	613	8	0	q
4	Kim Ok-geum	623	15	4	q
5	Turkey	1233	31	10	q
5	Bahattin Hekimoglu	661	24	7	q
5	Nil Mısır	572	7	3	q
6	United States	1201	33	10	q
6	Jason Tabansky	654	25	8	q
6	Tracy Otto	547	8	2	q
7	Brazil	1130	21	9	q
7	Eugênio Santana	627	19	9	q
7	Juliana Ferreira da Silva	503	2	0	q

PR : Paralympic Games Record Q: qualified directly to semifinal q: qualified to quarterfinal

== Knockout rounds ==
Quarterfinals
4	South Korea	134
5	Turkey	132
3	Italy	139
6	United States	126
2	Czech Republic	144
7	Brazil	121

Semifinals
1	China	145
4	South Korea	139
3	Italy	138
2	Czech Republic	146

Gold Medal Match
1	China	147
2	Czech Republic	143
Bronze Medal Match
4	South Korea	132
3	Italy	134
