= Victoria Kingstone =

Victoria Kingstone may refer to:

- Victoria Kingstone (archer)
- Victoria Kingstone (politician)
