= Bülent Korkmaz (archer) =

Turkish Paralympic archer (born 1975)

Personal information
- Nationality: Turkish
- Born: 5 March 1975 (age 51) Turkey
- Home town: Biga, Çanakkale Province, Turkey

Sport
- Country: Turkey
- Sport: Paralympic archery
- Event: Compound bow

Achievements and titles
- Paralympic finals: 2016
Medal record
Men's archery – compound bow
Representing Turkey
Summer Paralympics
Silver medal – second place	2020 Tokyo	Mixed team compound
World Para Archery Championships
Silver medal – second place	2015 Donaueschingen	Men's Team Compound
European Para-Archery Championships
Bronze medal – third place	2022 Rome	Mixed Team Compound
Silver medal – second place	2018 Plzen	Men's Team Compound
Gold medal – first place	2016 Saint-Jean-de-Monts	Men's Team Compound
Silver medal – second place	2014 Nottwil	Men's Team Compound
- Updated on 2 September 2016

Bülent Korkmaz (born 5 March 1975) is a Turkish Paralympian archer competing in the Men's compound bow event.

== Early life ==
Bülent Korkmaz was born on 5 March 1975. He lives in Biga town of Çanakkale Province, where he is employed by the municipality.

== Sporting career ==
Korkmaz won with the national team a silver medal at the 2014 European Para Archery Championships in Nottwil, Switzerland, a silver medal at the 2015 World Para Archery Championships in Donaueschingen, Germany, and a gold medal at the 2016 European Para Archery Championships in Saint-Jean-de-Monts, France.

He obtained a quota spot for the 2016 Summer Paralympics in Rio de Janeiro, Brazil. He won the silver medal with his teammate Öznur Cüre in the Mixed team compound event at the Archery at the 2020 Summer Paralympics.
