= Victoria Kingstone (archer) =

Personal information
- Born: 7 August 1981 (age 44) Chatham, England

Sport
- Sport: Para archery
- Event: W1
- Club: Guildford AC
- Coached by: Andrea Gales
Medal record
Women's para-archery
Representing Great Britain
European Para Championships
Gold medal – first place	2023 Rotterdam	Individual compound/Recurve W1
Silver medal – second place	2022 Rome	Team W1
Bronze medal – third place	2023 Rotterdam	Team W1

Victoria Kingstone (born 7 August 1981) competes in Para archery for Great Britain in the W1 Classification.

== Career ==
Kingstone originally played Wheelchair basketball, however after being diagnosed with Osteoporosis, and made the switch to Archery in 2017.

Kingstone’s first major competition was at the 2019 World Para Archery Championship. Here she placed 6th in the Individual W1.

At the 2022 World Para Archery Championships, she placed 7th in the Individual W1.

In the team event at the European championships she won a silver medal, placing 5th in the individual.

The following year, she placed 6th in the team event at the 2023 World Para Archery Championships and 8th in the individual. At the European championships that year, she won gold in the individual compound/recurve W1 and a bronze in the team W1. She was also selected to be part of the UK sports programme.

At the 2024 European Para-Archery Championships she placed 4th in both the individual and team events.

Kingstone was selected to compete at the 2024 Summer Paralympics in the individual W1. There she placed 6th.
