= Öznur Cüre =

Turkish para-archer (born 1997)

Personal information
- Full name: Öznur Cüre Girdi
- Nationality: Turkish
- Born: Öznur Cüre; 1 October 1997 (age 28) Kağıthane, Istanbul, Turkey
- Education: Sport management Istanbul Aydın University
- Height: 1.65 m (5 ft 5 in)
- Weight: 78 kg (172 lb)

Sport
- Country: Turkey
- Sport: Paralympic archery
- Event: Compound bow W2
- Club: Okçuluk Vakfı SK
- Coached by: Elanur Karakoç and Hasan Basri Hancı
Medal record
Women's archery compound bow W2
Representing Turkey
Paralympic Games
Gold medal – first place	2024 Paris	Individual compound
Silver medal – second place	2020 Tokyo	Mixed team
World Championships
Gold medal – first place	2022 Dubai	Doubles
Gold medal – first place	2023 Plzeň	Individual
Gold medal – first place	2025 Gwangju	Doubles
Silver medal – second place	2025 Gwangju	Individual
Silver medal – second place	2025 Gwangju	Mixed team
European Championships
Gold medal – first place	2024 Rome	Individual
Gold medal – first place	2024 Rome	Team
Silver medal – second place	2022 Rome	Individual
Bronze medal – third place	2022 Rome	Mixed team
European Para Championships
Gold medal – first place	2023 Rotterdam	Doubles
Bronze medal – third place	2023 Rotterdam	Individual
Bronze medal – third place	2023 Rotterdam	Mixed team
Tournaments
Gold medal – first place	2024 Dubai	Mixed team

Öznur Cüre Girdi (née Öznur Cüre, born 1 October 1997) is a Turkish Paralympian archer competing in the women's compound bow W2 event. She is Paralympics, world and European champion, and holds a world record.

== Sport career ==
During her physical therapy for paralysis in hospitals away from home, Cüre started playing sitting volleyball. She did not continue with this sport, however. After completing her physical therapy, she returned to Istanbul, and started her sport career in para archery in 2019, when she met para archer Bahattin Hekimoğlu, who invited her to join the Okçuluk Vakfı Sports Club.

She is 1.65 m (5 ft 5 in) tall at 78 kg (172 lb). She competes in the W2 wheelchair disability class of compound bow events. She is coached by Elanur Karakoç and Hasan Basri Hancı.

=== 2020 ===
Cüre ranked fourth in the Compound Women Open Individual and Compound Open Mixed Team event with her teammate Murat Turan at 6th Fazza Para Archery World Ranking Tournament in Dubai, United Arab Emirates.

She competed at the 2020 World Qualification Tournament in Nové Město nad Metují, Czech Republic, and qualified for the 2020 Tokyo Paralympics.

=== 2021 ===
At the 7th Fazza Para Archery World Ranking Tournament in Dubai, United Arab Emirates, she ranked fifth in the Compound Women Open Individual, and took the fourth place in the Compound Open Mixed Team event with Murat Turan.

She represented Turkey at the delayed 2020 Summer Paralympics in the Individual compound open and Mixed team compound events. She won the silver medal with her teammate Bülent Korkmaz in the Mixed team compound event at the 2020 Summer Paralympics.

=== 2022 ===
She and her teammate Sevgi Yorulmaz set a new world record with 1,344 points in the Compound Women Open Doubles event of the Ranking round at the 2022 World Para Archery Championships in Dubai, United Arab Emirates and won the gold medal in the final.

=== 2023 ===
She clinched the world champion title in the Compound Women Open event at the 2023 World Para Archery Championships in Plzeň, Czech Republic.

=== 2024 ===
She won a gold medal with her teammate Abdullah Yorulmaz in the mixed team event at the 8th Fazza Para Archery World Ranking Tournament in Dubai, United Arab Emirates in March 2024. Cüre set a new world record with 704 points in the Ranking round of the Women's individual compound open event at the 2024 Summer Paralympics in Paris, France, and qualified for the Elimination rounds taking the first place. She claimed the gold medal in the Women's individual event at the 2024 Paris Paralympics beating the Iranian Fatemeh Hemmati.

=== 2025 ===
She won the gold medal with her teammate Büşra Ün in the doubles open event at the 2025 World Para Archery Championships in Gwangju, South Korea.

== Personal life ==
Öznurr Cüre was born in Kağıthane district of Istanbul, Turkey on 1 October 1997. She has two older sisters and a young brother.

In 2014 returning from Ordu to Istanbul, her father Kasım Cüre caused a traffic accident with the car roll-over. Her mother was paralyzed down the neck, and she from the waist down. She received physical therapy in Bolu and later in Düzce.

She attended Istanbul Aydın University studying Sport management in the Faculty of Sports science.

In February 2023, she married Fatih Girdi from Zonguldak, and appended her spouse's family name Girdi to her surname. The couple lives in Istanbul.
