= Burcu Dağ =

Turkish para-archer (born 1981)

Personal information
- Nationality: Turkish
- Born: June 28, 1981 (age 44)

Sport
- Country: Turkey
- Sport: Para-archery
- Event: Compound bow Standing
Medal record
yes
Women's archery Compound bow Standing
Representing Turkey
World Archery Championships
Gold medal – first place	2013 Bangkok	Open
Gold medal – first place	2013 Bangkok	Open women's Team
European Para-Archery Championships
Gold medal – first place	2014 Nottwil	Mixed team
Bronze medal – third place	2014 Nottwil	Women's team

Burcu Dağ (born June 28, 1981) is a Turkish female para-archer competing in the women's Compound bow Standing event.

She began with archery in 2011. She shoots right-handed.

Dağ won a gold medal in the individual event and another gold medal in the team event at the 2013 World Para-archery Championships held in Bangkok, Thailand.

In 2014, she won a bronze medal with her teammates Gülbin Su and Handan Biroğlu, and a gold medal in the mixed team event at the European Para-Archery Championships in Nottwil, Switzerland.
