= Handan Biroğlu =

Turkish Paralympic archer (born 1981)

Personal information
- Born: 1 March 1981 (age 45) Erzincan, Turkey

Sport
- Sport: Paralympic archery
- Event: Compound bow
- Club: Ankara Bozoklar SK
- Coached by: Okyay Tunç Küçükkayalar

Achievements and titles
- Paralympic finals: 2016
Medal record
Women's archery Compound bow
Representing Turkey
European Para-Archery Championships
Silver medal – second place	2016 Saint-Jean-de-Monts	Open
Bronze medal – third place	2014 Nottwil	Open Team
- Updated on 10 April 2016

Handan Biroğlu (born 1 March 1981) is a Turkish female para-archer competing in the women's compound bow event. She represents her country at the 2016 Paralympics.

== Early life ==
Handan Biroğlu was born in Erzincan, Turkey on 1 March 1981. She resides in Ankara. In 2001, she was paralyzed due to a spinal cord injury she sustained in a bus accident, and has since required the use of a wheelchair.

Biroğlu became pregnant about a year after her accident. During her pregnancy, physicians advised her to abort due to her paraplegia and to her fetus' brain defect. However, she decided to give birth, risking her own life. Two years after her accident, she became the mother of a daughter. Six years after her daughter's birth, she and her husband separated. Biroğlu raised her daughter Nurdan alone in her father's home.

Biroğlu says "The existence of my daughter gave me zest for my life", and adds that she "chose archery to be a powerful role model for my daughter."

== Sporting career ==
In late 2013, Biroğlu began to practise archery in the compound bow event by training under the instruction of coach Macide Erdener at the archery field in Lozan Park of Çankaya, Ankara. She competed for the archery-specialized sports club Ankara Okçuluk İhtisas SK, before she transferred to Ankara Bozoklar SK. She has been coached by Okyay Tunç Küçükkayalar since 2014.

Biroğlu is right-handed and shoots 69 cm (27 in) long arrows, with a bow draw weight of 26 kg (57 lb). In 2015, she was named Disabled Sportsperson of the Year in Turkey. In March 2014, a year after taking up archery, Biroğlu qualified to join the training camp of the Turkish national team after ranking fourth at the Turkish Indoor Archery Para Championships.

She competed internationally for the first time in the 2014 European Para Archery Championships held in Nottwil, Switzerland. She placed eighth in the Compound Bow Open Women event, and won the bronze medal in the Compound Women Open Team event with her teammates Burcu Dağ and Gülbin Su after defeating Italy in the finals. At the 2015 World Archery Para Championships held in Donaueschingen, Germany, Biroğlu placed fifth in the Compound Women Open event after defeating Ireland's Kerrie-Louise Leonard, securing a spot in the 2016 Rio Paralympics. She took the silver medal in the Compound Women Open event at the 2016 European Para Archery Championships in Saint-Jean-de-Monts, France after being beaten by Russia's Tatiana Andrievskaia in the final.

Biroğlu was the runner-up at the 2016 Turkish Archery Para Championships held in Kemer, Antalya.

== Honors ==
Individual

- Disabled Sportsperson of the Year in Turkey 2015.

== See also ==
- Turkish women in sports
