= Pooja Khanna =

Indian paralympic archer

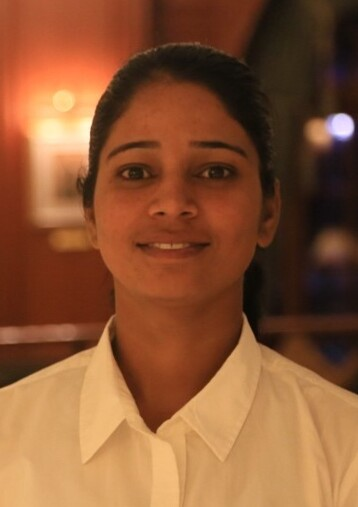

Personal information
- Nationality: Indian
- Born: Pooja Khanna; 19 November 1990 (age 35) Rohtak, Harayana, India

Sport
- Country: India
- Sport: Archery,
- Disability: Poliomyelitis (Right Leg)

Achievements and titles
- Paralympic finals: Represented (2016)
- Highest world ranking: 41 (2018)
Medal record
Women's Archery
Representing India
Para National Archery Championship 2016
Gold medal – first place	Rohtak	Recurve

Pooja Khanna is India's first ever Paralympic Archery player. She debuted at the 2016 Rio Paralympics at the age of 25 and was the only archer from India among all 19 athletes sent to the Games. She secured a fifth-place in the final Paralympic Qualifier which secured India's spot in the 2016 Olympics under World Quota Recurve Women Open in the Czech Republic 2016. Her Olympics journey ended at Round 32 after she failed to defeat Poland's Milena Olszewska by 2–6. She was able to secure a rank of 29 out of the 32 archers participating.

== Early life and education ==
Pooja Khanna was born in Rohtak, Haryana to parents who struggled by doing odd jobs for their living. Her father used to be a bin and scrap collector. On being not able to see her father's misery and financial inadequacy, she decided to venture into sports. She was diagnosed with Poliomyelitis during childhood. Her initial interest was in Shooting but instead she pursued her career in Discus throw until 2014, when she finally switched to Archery. Because of her disability and their financial condition, her parents were against of their daughter taking up Archery, but eventually started supporting her. She was born to a Dalit family and during her training faced discrimination and untouchability. She completed her Masters degree in Library Sciences from Baba Mastnath University, Rohtak. She is the eldest sibling out of four children.

== Career ==
Her journey in sports began with her love and passion for Shooting since childhood. Her original plan was to compete at the highest level in Shooting. She used to get trained in Shooting at Rajiv Gandhi Stadium in Rohtak, but left her dream to compete at the highest level, because of less future scope and high costs. After leaving Shooting, she started her career in Discus throw and continued with it for three years and even played games at higher levels. It was only until 2014, when she discovered her likeness and inclination towards Archery, and learnt it in just two and a half years.

=== Rio Olympics, 2016 ===
The Rio 2016 Paralympics marked the first time in history that an Indian athlete competed in the Para-archery event. Pooja made it till the Round 32 where she was pitted against Poland's Milena Olszewska. The match had 4 sets, which started with Milena scoring 25 to Pooja's 22. The second set finished with Milena's 23 to Pooja's 21. In the third set, Pooja scored more than Milena which was 25-24. In the fourth set, Milena again defeated Pooja by scoring 23-22. Pooja's overall score lead to her exit from her Olympics journey.

Pooja secured 29th spot out of 32 participants, whereas, Milena secured 4th spot.
