= 2023 World Para Archery Championships =

- Location: Plzeň, Czech Republic
- Dates: 17–23 July 2023
- Competitors: 291 from 54 nations

The 14th World Para Archery Championships took place in Plzeň, Czech Republic from 17 to 23 July 2023.

== Medals table ==
* Host nation (Czech Republic)

| Rank | Nation | Gold | Silver | Bronze | Total |
|---|---|---|---|---|---|
| 1 | China | 7 | 1 | 3 | 11 |
| 2 | Italy | 2 | 6 | 0 | 8 |
| 3 | Turkey | 2 | 2 | 1 | 5 |
| 4 | Great Britain | 2 | 1 | 1 | 4 |
| 5 | Australia | 1 | 1 | 1 | 3 |
| 5 | India | 1 | 1 | 1 | 3 |
| 7 | Czech Republic* | 1 | 0 | 3 | 4 |
| 8 | United States | 1 | 0 | 1 | 2 |
| 9 | Brazil | 0 | 2 | 1 | 3 |
| 10 | Iran | 0 | 1 | 2 | 3 |
| 11 | Poland | 0 | 1 | 0 | 1 |
| 11 | Ukraine | 0 | 1 | 0 | 1 |
| 13 | Belgium | 0 | 0 | 1 | 1 |
| 13 | Japan | 0 | 0 | 1 | 1 |
| 13 | South Korea | 0 | 0 | 1 | 1 |
| Totals (15 entries) | | 17 | 17 | 17 | 51 |

== Medal summary ==
| Event | Gold | Silver | Bronze |
|---|---|---|---|
| Compound Men Open | Matteo Bonacina; Italy | Nathan MacQueen; Great Britain | Jonathon Milne; Australia |
| Compound Women Open | Öznur Cüre; Turkey | Sheetal Devi; India | Jane Karla Gögel; Brazil |
| Compound Men Open Doubles | China; Ai Xinliang; He Zihao | Iran; Alisina Manshaezadeh; Hadi Nori | United States; Kevin Polish; Matt Stutzman |
| Compound Women Open Doubles | Great Britain; Phoebe Paterson Pine; Jodie Grinham | Brazil; Jane Karla Gögel; Helena Nunes de Moraes | India; Sarita; Jyoti |
| Compound Open Mixed Team | India; Sarita; Rakesh Kumar | Brazil; Jane Karla Gögel; Reinaldo Vagner Charao Ferreira | China; Lin Yueshan; Ai Xinliang |
| Men W1 | Christopher Davis; Australia | Bahattin Hekimoğlu; Turkey | David Drahonínský; Czech Republic |
| Women W1 | Zhang Lu; China | Asia Pellizzari; Italy | Chen Minyi; China |
| Men W1 Doubles | China; Zhang Tianxin; Han Guifei | Turkey; Bahattin Hekimoğlu; Yiğit Caner Aydın | Czech Republic; David Drahonínský; Karel Davídek |
| Women W1 Doubles | China; Zhang Lu; Chen Minyi | Italy; Asia Pellizzari; Daila Dameno | Czech Republic; Šárka Musilová; Tereza Brandtlová |
| W1 Mixed Team | Czech Republic; Tereza Brandtlová; David Drahonínský | Italy; Asia Pellizzari; Paolo Tonon | South Korea; Kim Ok-geum; Park Hong-jo |
| Visually Impaired 1 | Matteo Panariello; Italy | Craig Newbery; Australia | Ruben Vanhollebeke; Belgium |
| Visually Impaired 2 / 3 | Steve Prowse; Great Britain | Daniele Piran; Italy | Nicholas Thomas; Great Britain |
| Recurve Men Open | Kevin Mather; United States | Ruslan Tsymbaliuk; Ukraine | Mohammad Reza Arab Ameri; Iran |
| Recurve Women Open | Wu Chunyan; China | Milena Olszewska; Poland | Wu Yang; China |
| Recurve Men Open Doubles | Turkey; Yavuz Papağan; Sadık Savaş | China; Zhao Lixue; Gan Jun | Iran; Mohammad Reza Arab Ameri; Gholamreza Rahimi |
| Recurve Women Open Doubles | China; Wu Chunyan; Wu Yang | Italy; Elisabetta Mijno; Vincenza Petrilli | Turkey; Yağmur Şengül; Merve Nur Eroğlu |
| Recurve Open Mixed Team | China; Wu Chunyan; Zhao Lixue | Italy; Elisabetta Mijno; Stefano Travisani | Japan; Chika Shigesada; Tomohiro Ueyama |

== Participants ==
A total of 291 archers from the national teams of the following 54 countries was registered to compete at 2023 World Para Archery Championship.

- Andorra (1)
- Australia (11)
- Austria (4)
- Azerbaijan (5)
- Belgium (3)
- Brazil (9)
- Canada (4)
- Chile (1)
- China (17)
- Colombia (4)
- Costa Rica (1)
- Cyprus (1)
- Czech Republic (8)
- Spain (4)
- Finland (2)
- France (7)
- United Kingdom (14)
- Georgia (3)
- Guatemala (1)
- Hong Kong (3)
- Hungary (2)
- Indonesia (5)
- India (13)
- Iran (10)
- Ireland (1)
- Iraq (4)
- Iceland (1)
- Italy (20)
- Japan (5)
- Kazakhstan (6)
- South Korea (12)
- Latvia (3)
- Lithuania (1)
- Malaysia (5)
- Mexico (10)
- Mongolia (5)
- Netherlands (2)
- Pakistan (1)
- Poland (6)
- Romania (8)
- South Africa (3)
- Senegal (1)
- Singapore (1)
- Slovenia (2)
- Serbia (1)
- Sri Lanka (1)
- Switzerland (1)
- Slovakia (4)
- Thailand (9)
- Chinese Taipei (7)
- Turkey (11)
- Ukraine (6)
- United States (16)
- Uzbekistan (5)
