= Wu Yang (archer) =

Chinese Paralympic archer (born 1992)

Personal information
- Born: 1 January 1992 (age 34) Hancheng, Shaanxi, China

Sport
- Country: China
- Sport: Para-archery
Medal record
Representing China
Para-archery
Paralympic Games
Silver medal – second place	2024 Paris	Individual recurve open
World Championships
Bronze medal – third place	2023 Plzeň	Individual recurve open
Asian Para Games
Gold medal – first place	2022 Hangzhou	Doubles recurve open
Silver medal – second place	2022 Hangzhou	Individual recurve open

Wu Yang (born 1 January 1992) is a Chinese para-archer. She represented China at the 2024 Summer Paralympics.

== Career ==
Yang competed at the 2023 World Para Archery Championships and won a bronze medal in the individual recurve open.

Yang represented China at the 2024 Summer Paralympics and won a silver medal in the individual recurve open.
