= Kseniya Markitantova =

Ukrainian Paralympic archer

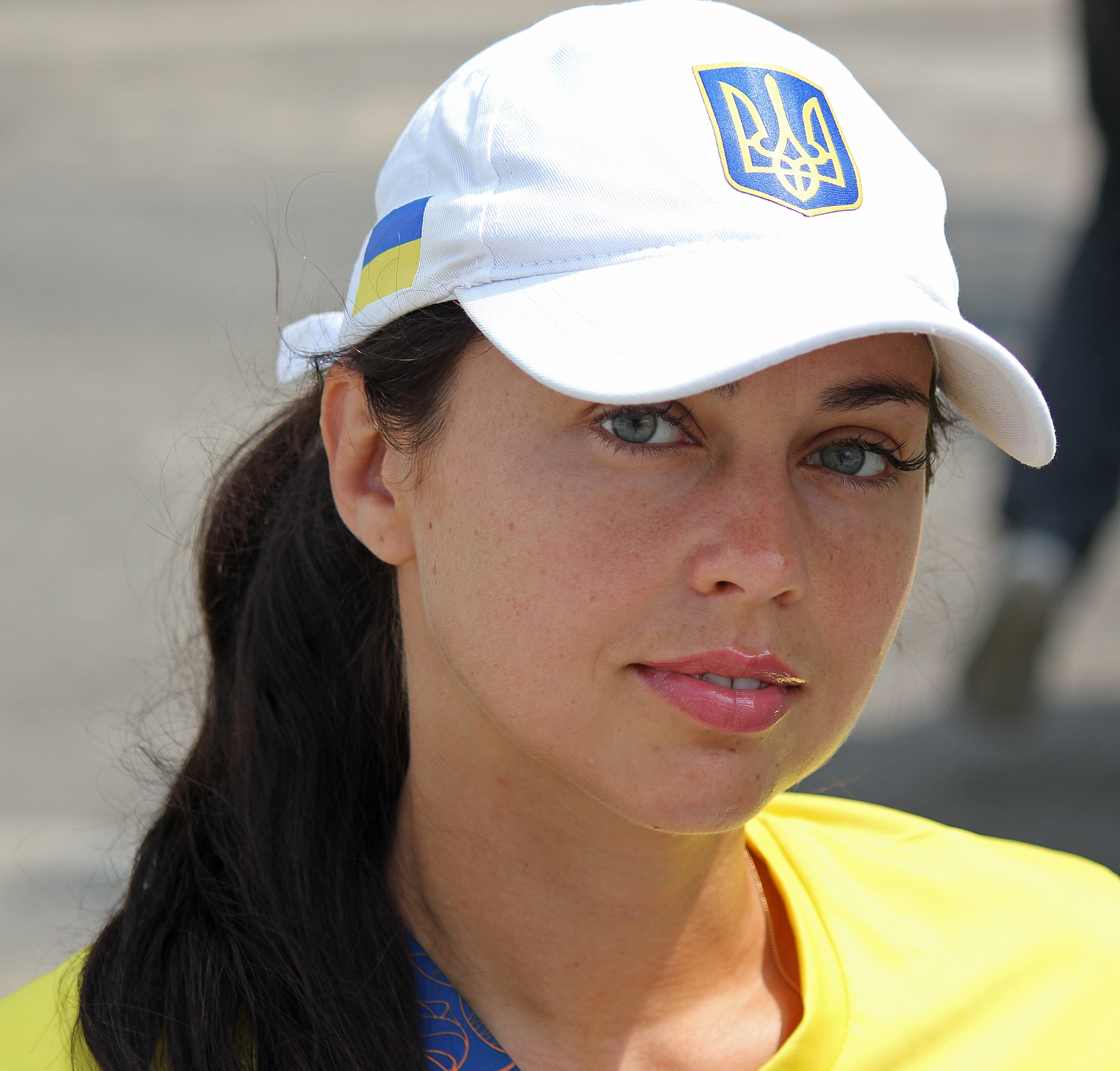
- Kseniya Markitankova

Personal information
- Nationality: Ukrainian
- Born: 15 July 1981 (age 44) Kyiv, Ukraine

Sport
- Sport: Archery
- Event: Compound
Medal record
Women's archery compound bow
Representing Ukraine
European Para Championships
Silver medal – second place	2023 Rotterdam	Women's individual compound open

Kseniya Markitantova (Ukrainian: Ксенія Маркітантова; born 15 July 1981) is a Ukrainian Paralympic archer.

== Career ==
Markitantova competed for Ukraine in the 2012 and 2016 Summer Paralympics in women's compound. She competed for Poland at the 2024 Summer Paralympics.
