= Yağmur Şengül =

Turkish para-archer (born 1994)

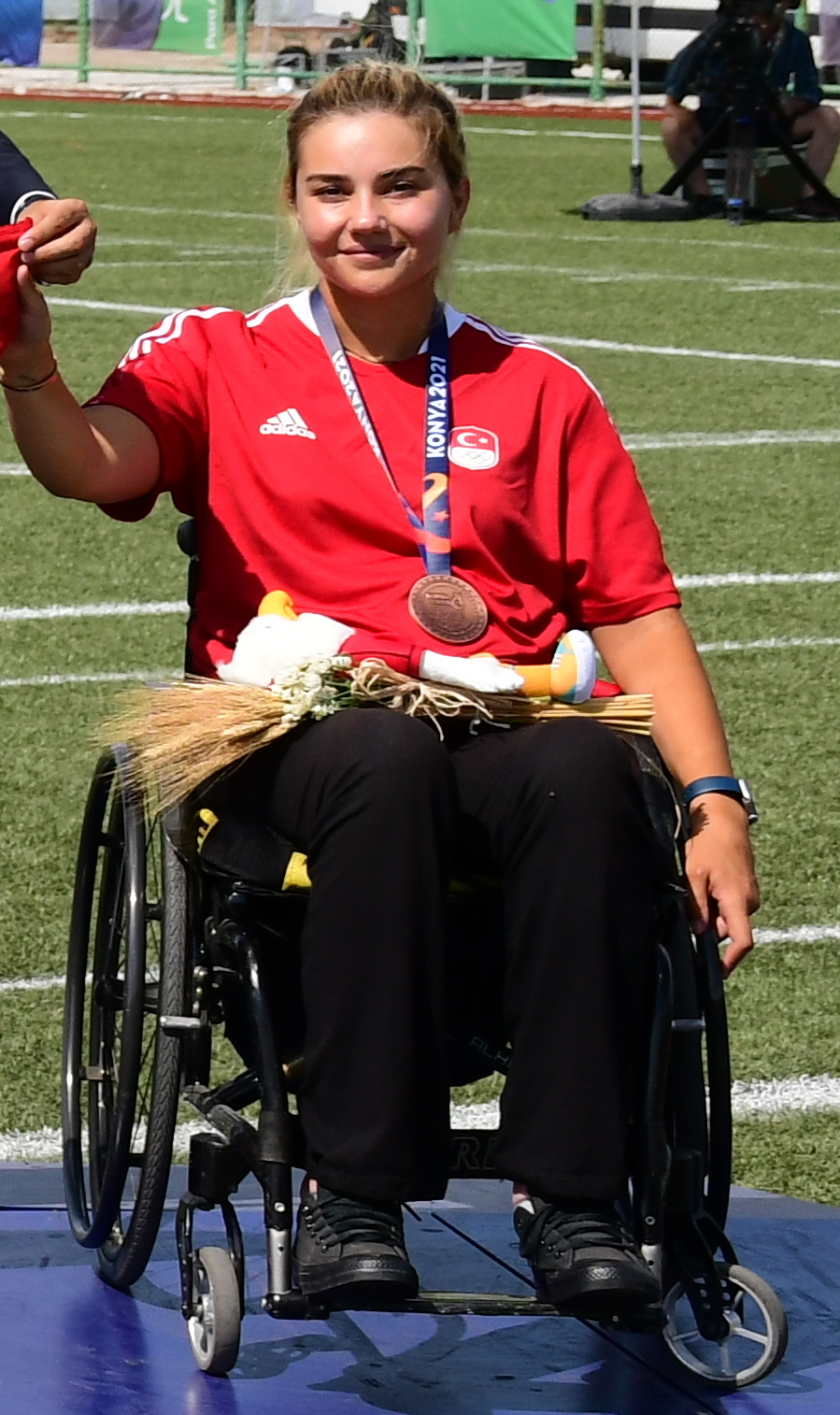

Personal information
- Nationality: Turkish
- Born: 18 January 1994 (age 32) Turkey

Sport
- Country: Turkey
- Sport: Paralympic archery
- Event: Recurve bow W2
Medal record
Women's archery recurve bow W2
Representing Turkey
World Championships
Bronze medal – third place	2023 Plzeň	Open Doubles
European Para Championships
Silver medal – second place	2023 Rotterdam	Women's individual recurve open

Yağmur Şengül (born 18 January 1994) is a Turkish Paralympian archer competing in the Women's recurve bow W2 event.

== Career ==
Şengül competed at the 2018 European Para-Archery Championships in Plzeň, Czech Republic, and placed fourth losing the bronze medal match. She won the gold medal in the Individual recurve event at the 7th Fazza Para Archery World Ranking Tournament in Dubai, United Arab Emirates in 2021.

She is competing at the 2020 Summer Paralympics in the Individual recurve open and Mixed team recurve events.
