= Roberto Airoldi =

Italian Paralympic archer (born 1976)

Personal information
- Nationality: Italian
- Born: 19 January 1976 (age 50) Novara, Italy

Sport
- Sport: Archery
- Club: ASD Arcieri Cameri
- Coached by: Rocco Tarullo
Medal record
Representing Italy
Paralympic Games
Archery
Bronze medal – third place	2016 Rio de Janeiro	Mixed team recurve open

Roberto Airoldi (born 19 January 1976) is an Italian Paralympic archer.

In the 2016 Summer Paralympics, his debut games, Airoldi won his first Paralympic medal which was bronze.

Airoldi's hobbies are motorbiking, rugby and trekking.
