= Paolo Tonon =

Italian paralympic archer (born 1989)

Personal information
- Born: 28 November 1989 (age 36)

Sport
- Country: Italy
- Sport: Para-archery
Medal record
Para-archery
Representing Italy
Paralympic Games
| Bronze medal – third place | 2024 Paris | Mixed team W1 |
World Championships
| Silver medal – second place | 2023 Plzeň | Mixed team W1 |
European Championships
| Gold medal – first place | 2022 Rome | Mixed team W1 |
European Para Championships
| Gold medal – first place | 2023 Rotterdam | Mixed team W1 |
| Silver medal – second place | 2023 Rotterdam | Team W1 |

Paolo Tonon (born 28 November 1989) is an Italian paralympic archer. He competed at the 2024 Summer Paralympics, winning the bronze medal in the mixed team W1 event, and just missed out on a bronze medal in the Men's individual W1 individual event, finishing in 4th.
