= Živa Lavrinc =

Slovenian Paralympic archer (born 1989)

Personal information
- Nationality: Slovenian
- Born: 31 May 1989 (age 37)

Sport
- Country: Slovenia
- Sport: Paralympic archery
- Event: Recurve bow
Medal record
Archery
Representing Slovenia
Paralympic Games
Bronze medal – third place	2024 Paris	Mixed team recurve open

Živa Lavrinc (born 31 May 1989) is a Slovenian para-archer. She represented Slovenia at the 2024 Summer Paralympics.

== Career ==
Lavrinc represented Slovenia at the 2024 Summer Paralympics and won a bronze medal in the mixed team recurve open event, along with Dejan Fabčič.
