= Nathan MacQueen =

British Paralympic archer (born 1991)

Nathan MacQueen MBE
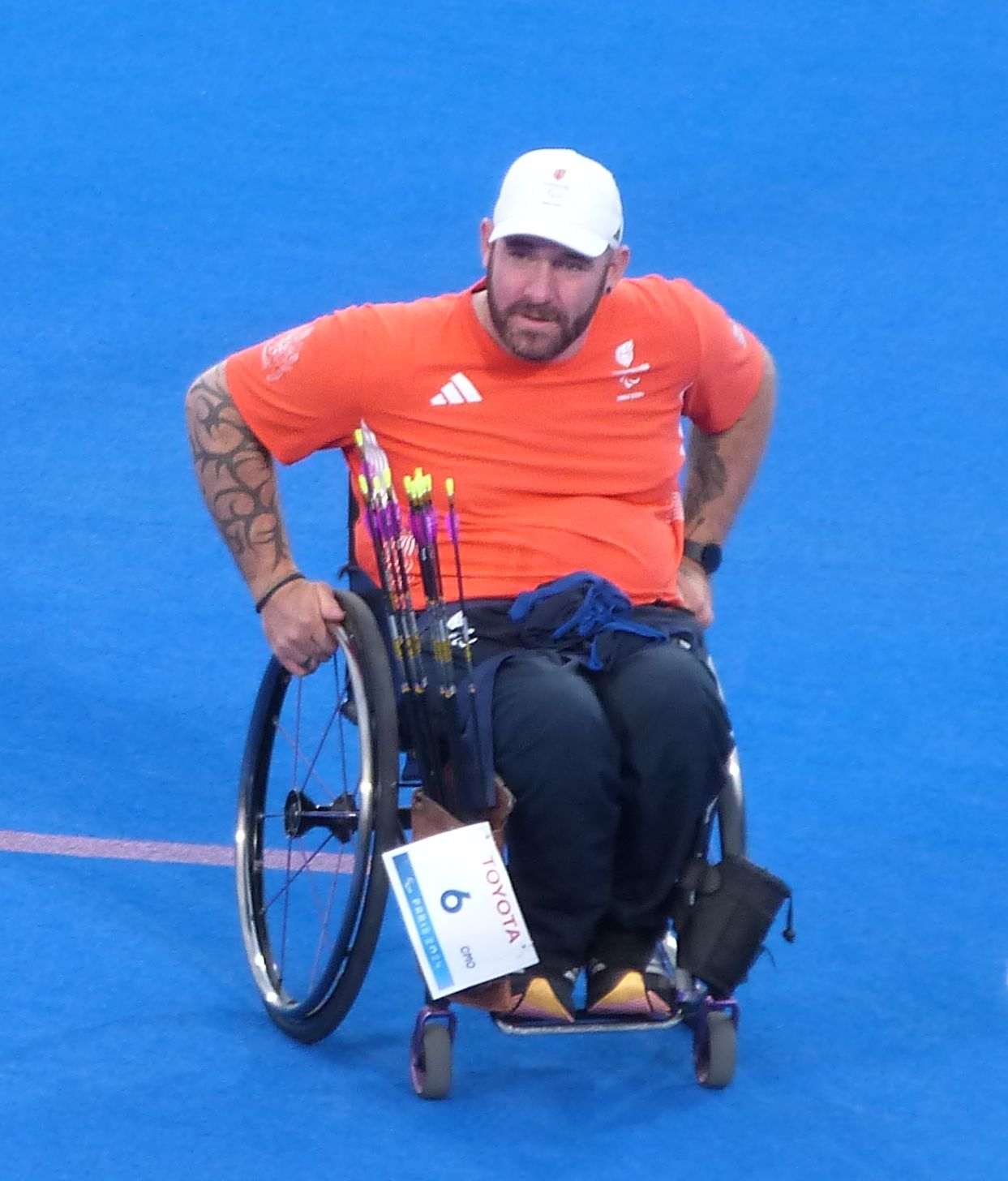
- MacQueen in 2024

Personal information
- Born: 24 June 1991 (age 35) Dumfries, Scotland

Sport
- Sport: Para archery
- Event: Compound
- Club: Balbardie Archers
- Coached by: Shaun Teasdale
Medal record
Men's compound para-archery
Representing Great Britain
Paralympic Games
Gold medal – first place	2024 Paris	Mixed team
World Championships
Silver medal – second place	2023 Plzeň	Individual
Bronze medal – third place	2025 Gwangju	Individual
Bronze medal – third place	2025 Gwangju	Double
European Para Championships
Gold medal – first place	2023 Rotterdam	Individual
Dutch Para Archery Tournament
Bronze medal – third place	2015 Almere	Team

Nathan MacQueen (born 24 June 1991) is a British Paralympic archer. He has competed at the Summer Paralympics.

== Career ==
A talented sportsman, MacQueen was a regular rugby player for Glasgow Warriors at under 21 level, before a serious motorbike accident left him paralysed at 18 years old.

Even before his injury, MacQueen was part of Scotland’s archery team. However, after a shoulder injury curtailed his powerlifting and basketball careers, his focus switched solely to archery. He made his international debut just months before Rio 2016, in which he placed 9th.

Following on from this success MacQueen has won multiple medals at both European and International levels. 2023 saw Nathan rise up the rankings to world number 1, winning silver at the World Para Championships, and becoming double European Paralympic Champion.

As of February 2024, MacQueen trains at Lilleshall Hall National Sports Centre, and at his main sponsor's storage facility, Purdie Worldwide, in Bathgate.

Nathan qualified to participate in both the individual and mixed team compound alongside Jodie Grinham for the 2024 Summer Paralympics. He came 5th in the individual and won gold in the mixed team event.
