= Sevgi Yorulmaz =

Turkish para-archer (born 1982)

Personal information
- Nationality: Turkish
- Born: 20 April 1982 (age 44) Batman, Turkey

Sport
- Country: Turkey
- Sport: Paralympic archery
- Event: Compound bow W2
- Club: Okçular Vakfı
Medal record
Women's archery Compound bow W2
Representing Turkey
World Championships
Gold medal – first place	2022 Dubai	Women Open Doubles
European Para Championships
Gold medal – first place	2023 Rotterdam	Women's individual compound open

Sevgi Yorulmaz (born 20 April 1982) is a Turkish Paralympian archer competing in the Women's compound bow W2 event. She lives in Denizli, Turkey. She is a member of the "Okçular Vakfı" ("Archers Foundation").

== Personal life ==
In 2014, she married Abdullah Yorulmaz (born 1983), also a wheelchair disabled person. After their marriage, she started also performing para archery like her husband.

== Sports career ==
She represented Turkey at the 2020 Summer Paralympics in the Individual compound open event.

At the 2022 World Para Archery Championships in Dubai, United Arab Emirates, she won the gold medal in the Compound Women Open Doubles event together with her teammate Öznur Cüre.
