= Bahattin Hekimoğlu =

Turkish para-archer (born 1989)

Personal information
- Born: 12 January 1989 (age 37) Şişli, Istanbul, Turkey
- Years active: 2016–

Sport
- Sport: Paralympic archery
- Disability: Permanent paralysis due to spinal cord injury
- Disability class: W1 (Wheelchair)
- Event: Recurve bow
- Club: Okçular Vakfı S.K.

Achievements and titles
- World finals: World Para Archery Championship
- Regional finals: European Para-Archery Championships
Medal record
Men's archery Recurve bow W1
Representing Turkey
Paralympic Games
Bronze medal – third place	2020 Tokyo	Individual W1
World Championship
Gold medal – first place	2019 s-Hertogenbosch	Individual W1
Silver medal – second place	2023 Plzeň	Individual W1
Silver medal – second place	2023 Plzeň	Men W1 Doubles
European Championships
Gold medal – first place	2018 Plzeň	Individual W1
European Para Championships
Silver medal – second place	2023 Rotterdam	Individual W1
Tournaments
Gold medal – first place	2021 Dubai	Individual W1
Gold medal – first place	2021 Dubai	Mixed team
- Updated on 27 February 2021

Bahattin Hekimoğlu (born 12 January 1989) is a Turkish world and European champion para-archer competing in the men's recurve bow W1 (wheelchair) event.

== Early years ==
Hekimoğlu was born in the Şişli district of Istanbul, Turkey on 12 January 1989.

After finishing high school in 2006, Hekimoğlu was about to enroll at Sakarya University. During the summer vacation that year, he went with his friends to Heybeliada, Istanbul to swim. Hekimoğlu hit the seabed after he jumped headfirst into the sea from the pier. He broke his neck, could not get out of the water, drowned, and his heart stopped. He was rescued by a physician, and was rushed to a hospital. He later learned that he was paralyzed following surgery for the spinal cord injury. He was not able to walk, and did not leave his home for the next two years. In 2008, his life changed when he received a motorized wheelchair from the "Türkiye Omurilik Felçlileri Derneği - TOFD" ("Turkey Spinal Cord Paralytics Association").

In 2013, Hekimoğlu joined the project "Disabled Designers - The Swallow Project" and received vocational training in graphic design. After twelve months of training, he was employed by the TOFD.

== Sports career ==
In 2016, Hekimoğlu decided to get involved in sport. He exercised three months long with pulleys for physical strength. By December of that year, he joined the "Okçular Vakfı Spor Kulübü" ("Archers Foundation Sports Club") obtaining his license. He became champion in the Turkish Outdoor Para Archery Championship.

Competing in the W1 class of the recurve division, Hekimoğlu won the gold medal at the 2018 European Para Archery Championships held in Plzeň, Czech Republic. He took the gold medal in the Individual W1 event at the 2019 World Para Archery Championship in 's-Hertogenbosch, Netherlands. At the 2021 Fazza Para Archery World Ranking Tournament held in Dubai, United Arab Emirates, he captured two gold medals, one in the Individual W1 and the other in the mixed team event together with his teammate Fatma Danabaş.
