= Sadık Savaş =

Turkish Paralympic archer (born 1987)

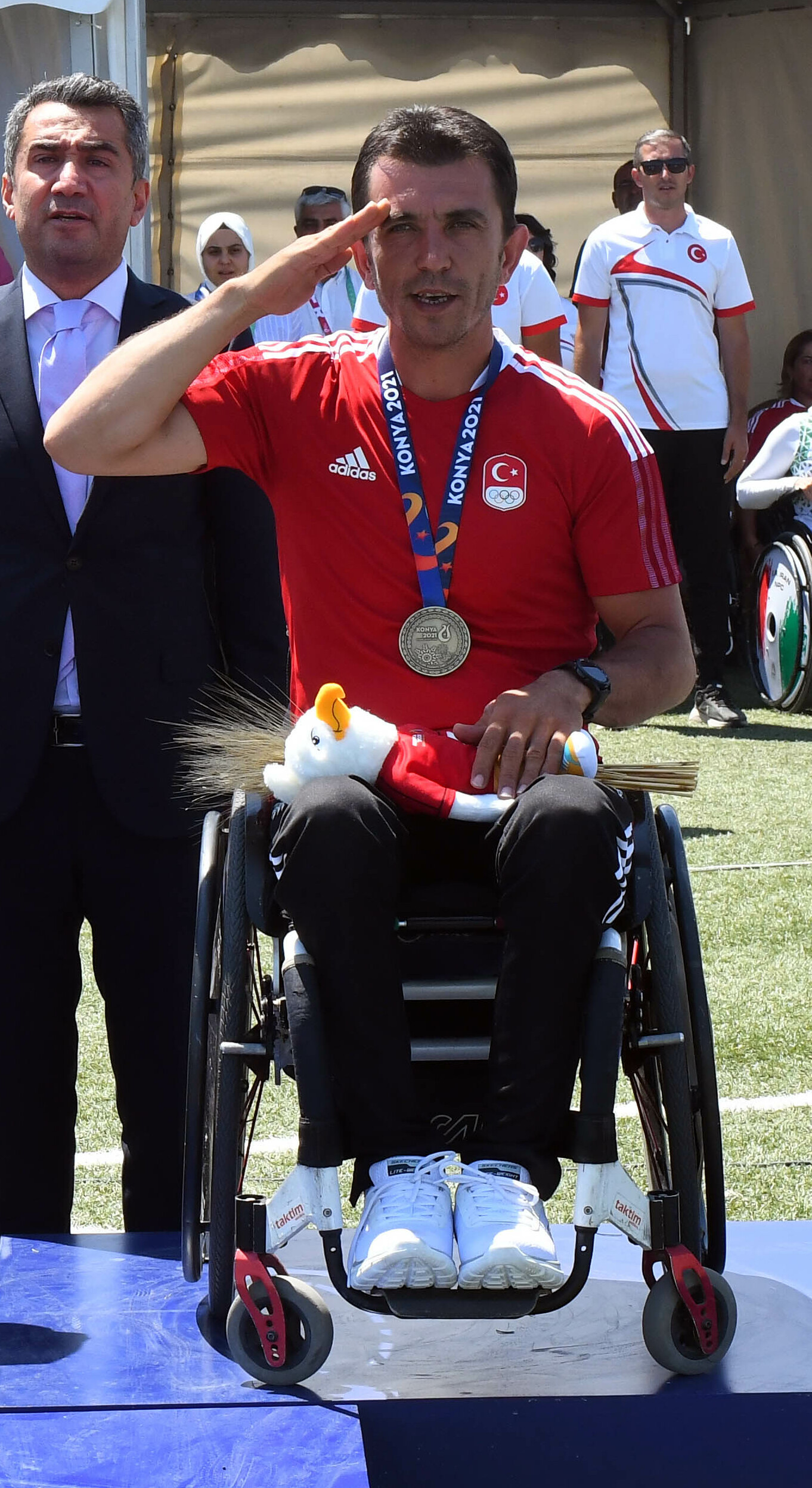
- Sadık Savaş at the 2021 Islamic Solidarity Games

Personal information
- Nationality: Turkish
- Born: 16 August 1987 (age 38) Yozgat, Turkey
- Home town: Ankara, Turkey

Sport
- Country: Turkey
- Sport: Paralympic archery
- Event: Recurve bow
- Coached by: Oğuzhan Polat

Achievements and titles
- Paralympic finals: 2016
Medal record
Men's archery Recurve bow
Representing Turkey
Paralympic Games
Silver medal – second place	2024 Paris	Mixed team recurve open
World Championships
Gold medal – first place	2023 Plzeň	Recurve open doubles
European Para Championships
Gold medal – first place	2023 Rotterdam	Men's individual recurve open
Tournaments
Silver medal – second place	2021 Dubai	Mixed team
- Updated on 27 February 2021

Sadık Savaş (born 16 August 1987) is a Turkish Paralympian archer competing in the Men's recurve bow event.

== Early life ==
Sadık Savaş was born on 16 August 1987. He lives in Ankara, Turkey.

== Sporting career ==
Savaş began his archery career in 2010, and debuted internationally in 2013. He has been coached by Oğuzhan Polat since 2012.

He obtained a quota for the 2016 Summer Paralympics Games in Rio de Janeiro, Brazil.

Savaş is right-handed and shoots 71 cm (28 in)-long arrows, with a bow draw weight of 18.5 kg (41 lb).

In 2021, he won the silver medal in the Mixed team event together with his teammate Merve Nur Eroğlu at the 7th Fazza Para Archery World Ranking Tournament held in Dubai, United Arab Emirates.
