= Elisabetta Mijno =

Italian Paralympic archer (born 1986)

Personal information
- Born: 10 January 1986 (age 40) Moncalieri, Italy

Sport
- Sport: Archery
- Club: Fiamme Azzurre
- Coached by: Giorgio Botto
Medal record
Archery
Representing Italy
Paralympic Games
Gold medal – first place	2024 Paris	Mixed team recurve open
Silver medal – second place	2012 London	Women's individual recurve W1/W2
Silver medal – second place	2020 Tokyo	Mixed team recurve open
Bronze medal – third place	2016 Rio de Janeiro	Mixed team recurve open
Bronze medal – third place	2024 Paris	Women's individual recurve
World Para-Archery Championships
Silver medal – second place	2025 Gwangju	Mixed Double Recurve open
European Para Championships
Gold medal – first place	2023 Rotterdam	Women's individual recurve open

Elisabetta Mijno (born 10 January 1986) is an Italian Paralympic archer.

== Career ==
At the 2012 Summer Paralympics, Mijno won a silver medal. Then, at the 2016 Summer Paralympics, she won a bronze.

She studied medicine at the University of Turin in Orbassano, Italy. Her hobbies are travelling, photography and reading.
