= Merve Nur Eroğlu =

Turkish para-archer (born 1993)

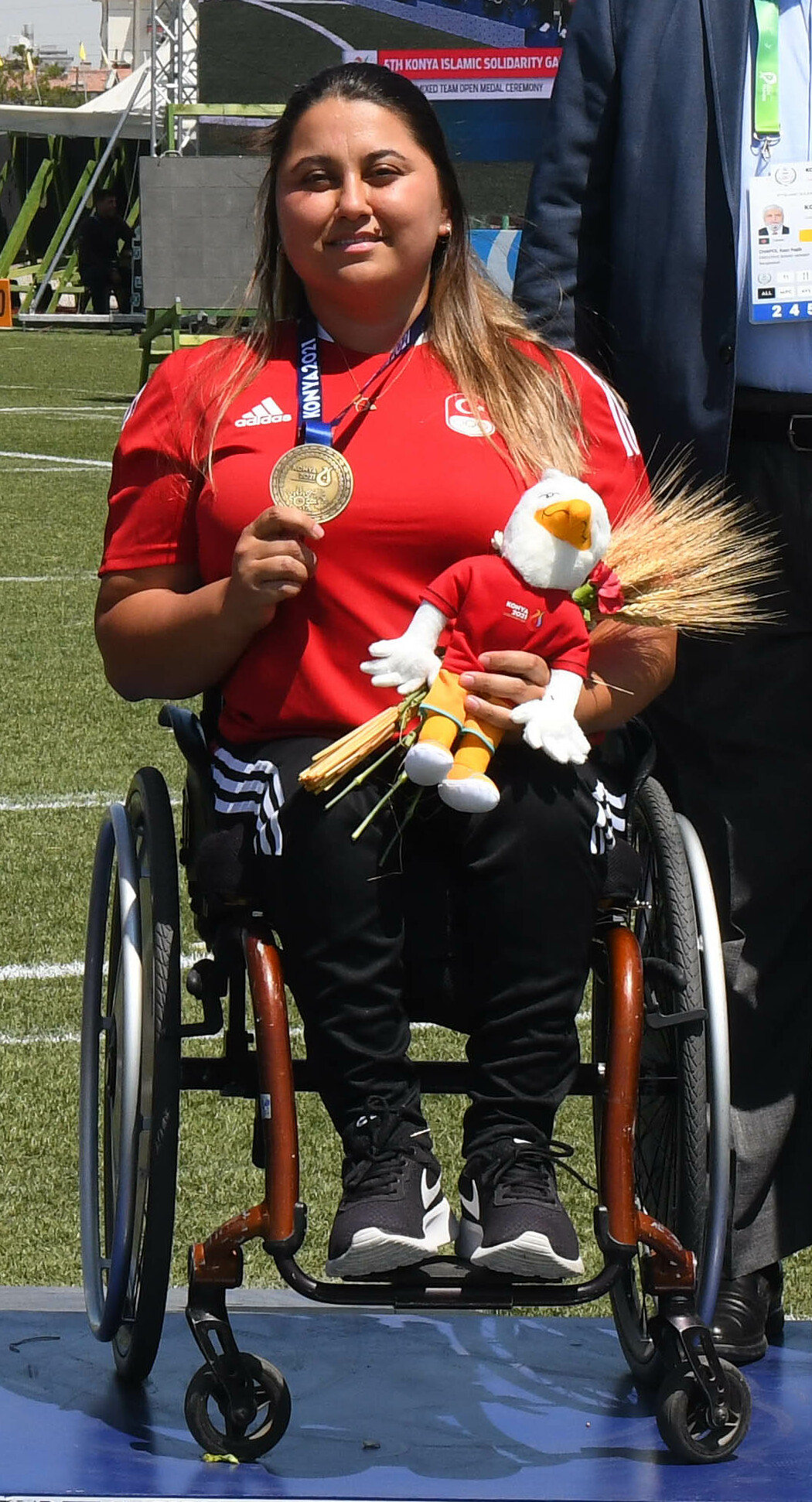
- Merve Nur Eroğlu at the 2021 Islamic Solidarity Games

Personal information
- Born: 25 March 1993 (age 33) Bolu, Turkey
- Years active: 2011–

Sport
- Sport: Paralympic archery
- Event: Recurve bow
- Coached by: Ahmet Soner Mersinli
Medal record
Women's archery Recurve bow
Representing Turkey
Paralympic Games
Silver medal – second place	2024 Paris	Mixed team recurve open
World Championships
Silver medal – second place	2017 Beijing	Open Ind
Silver medal – second place	2019 s-Hertogenbosch	Open Ind
Bronze medal – third place	2023 Plzeň	Open Doubles
European Championships
Silver medal – second place	2016 Saint-Jean-de-Monts	Open Ind
Bronze medal – third place	2014 Nottwil	Open Team
Tournaments,
Bronze medal – third place	2021 Dubai	Individual
Silver medal – second place	2021 Dubai	Mixed team
- Updated on 27 February 2021

Merve Nur Eroğlu (born 25 March 1993) is a Turkish para-archer competing in the women's recurve bow event. She took part at the 2016 Summer Paralympics.

== Early life ==
Merve Nur Eroğlu was born in Bolu, Turkey on 25 March 1993. She lives in her hometown.

At the age of six, she became paralyzed following a traffic accident. She uses a wheelchair.

== Sporting career ==
Eroğlu began with archery after finishing the high school in 2011. She trains at the sports hall of Bolu Police. She is coached by Ahmet Soner Mersinli.

She competed at the 2016 European Qualifier held in Saint-Jean-de-Monts, France, and obtained a quota spot for the 2016 Paralympics in Rio de Janeiro, Brazil.

In 2021, she won the bronze medal in the Individual and the silver medal in the Mixed team event together with her teammate Sadık Savaş at the 7th Fazza Para Archery World Ranking Tournament held in Dubai, United Arab Emirates.
