= Milena Olszewska =

Polish Paralympic archer (born 1984)

Personal information
- Full name: Milena Magdalena Olszewska
- Nationality: Polish
- Born: 21 May 1984 (age 42) Czarnków, Poland

Sport
- Sport: Archery
- Club: Gzsn Start
- Coached by: Ryszard Bukański
Medal record
Women's archery
Representing Poland
Paralympic Games
Bronze medal – third place	2012 London	Ind. recurve standing
Bronze medal – third place	2016 Rio de Janeiro	Ind. recurve open
European Para Championships
Bronze medal – third place	2023 Rotterdam	Ind. recurve open

Milena Magdalena Olszewska (born 21 May 1984) is a Polish Paralympic archer.

She has won two Paralympic bronze medals.

== Biography ==
Milena Olszewska was born with underdevelopment of her right leg, and at the age of 15 the leg was amputated. She completed her pedagogical studies at the State Higher Vocational School in Gorzów Wielkopolski and was employed in the office of the Gorzów Disability Sport "Start".

In 2007 she began training in archery, trained by Alicja Bukańska and coached by Ryszard Bukański. In 2009 she debuted at the World Para-Archery Championships, occupying 5th place in the team. In 2012 she made her debut at the Summer Paralympics in London, winning a bronze medal in the individual standing competition.

In 2013 she won the world championship in the slalom (with Piotr Sawicki), in the same competition she took third place individually. In 2013, she was ranked as the world's first disabled archer. In 2014 and 2016 she won the European Championship, in the same event she occupied second and third place respectively in the individual tournament. In 2016, at the Summer Paralympics in Rio de Janeiro, Milena won an individual bronze medal in the recurve (in open play this time).

She was decorated with Brown (2013) and Silver (2016) Cross of Merit (2013).
