= Brazil at the 2024 Summer Paralympics =

Sporting event delegation

- Flag of Brazil
- IPC code: BRA
- NPC: Brazilian Paralympic Committee
- Website: www.cpb.org.br (in Portuguese)

in Paris, France August 28, 2024 – September 8, 2024
- Competitors: 255 (138 men and 117 women) in 20 sports
- Flag bearers (opening): Gabriel Araújo; Elizabeth Gomes
- Flag bearers (closing): Fernando Rufino; Carolina Santiago
- Medals Ranked 5th: Gold 25 Silver 25 Bronze 38 Total 88

Summer Paralympics appearances (overview)
- 1972; 1976; 1980; 1984; 1988; 1992; 1996; 2000; 2004; 2008; 2012; 2016; 2020; 2024

Brazil competed at the 2024 Summer Paralympics in Paris, France, from 28 August to 8 September 2024.

Paralympic gold medalists in 2020 Summer Paralympics, the swimmer Gabriel Araújo and parathlete Elizabeth Gomes were the country's opening ceremony flagbearers. Meanwhile, Paralympic champions, the paracanoeist Fernando Rufino and swimmer Carolina Santiago were the country's flagbearers during the closing ceremony. On 25th March 2026, Ronan Cordeiro was disqualified from Men's PTS5 in Paratriathlon and lost his silver medal due to doping violations.

== Medalists ==
Medal	Name	Sport	Event	Date
Gold	Gabriel Araújo	Swimming	Men's 100 metre backstroke S2	29 August
Gold	Júlio Cesar Agripino	Athletics	Men's 5000 metres T11	30 August
Gold	Ricardo Mendonça	Athletics	Men's 100 metres T37	30 August
Gold	Petrúcio Ferreira	Athletics	Men's 100 metres T47	30 August
Gold	Ana Carolina Moura	Taekwondo	Women's 65 kg	30 August
Gold	Carolina Santiago	Swimming	Women's 100 metre backstroke S12	31 August
Gold	Gabriel Araújo	Swimming	Men's 50 metre backstroke S2	31 August
Gold	Fernanda Yara da Silva	Athletics	Women's 400 metres T47	31 August
Gold	Claudiney Batista	Athletics	Men's discus throw F56	2 September
Gold	Carolina Santiago	Swimming	Women's 50 metre freestyle S13	2 September
Gold	Gabriel Araújo	Swimming	Men's 200 metre freestyle S2	2 September
Gold	Elizabeth Gomes	Athletics	Women's discus throw F53	2 September
Gold	Yeltsin Jacques	Athletics	Men's 1500 metres T11	3 September
Gold	Jerusa Geber	Athletics	Women's 100 metres T11	3 September
Gold	Carolina Santiago	Swimming	Women's 100 metre freestyle S12	4 September
Gold	Talisson Glock	Swimming	Men's 400 metre freestyle S6	6 September
Gold	Alana Maldonado	Judo	Women's 70 kg J2	6 September
Gold	Rayane Soares	Athletics	Women's 400 metres T13	7 September
Gold	Mariana D'Andrea	Powerlifting	Women's 73 kg	7 September
Gold	Arthur Cavalcante da Silva	Judo	Men's 90 kg J1	7 September
Gold	Wilians Silva de Araújo	Judo	Men's +90 kg J1	7 September
Gold	Rebeca de Souza	Judo	Women's +70 kg J2	7 September
Gold	Jerusa Geber	Athletics	Women's 200 metres T11	7 September
Gold	Tayana Medeiros	Powerlifting	Women's 86 kg	8 September
Gold	Fernando Rufino	Paracanoeing	Men's VL2	8 September
Silver	Phelipe Rodrigues	Swimming	Men's 50 metre freestyle S10	29 August
Silver	Thalita Simplício	Athletics	Women's 400 metres T11	31 August
Silver	Wendell Belarmino	Swimming	Men's 50 metre freestyle S11	31 August
Silver	Joeferson Marinho	Athletics	Men's 100 metres T12	31 August
Silver	Alexandre Galgani	Shooting	R5 Mixed 10 metre air rifle prone SH2	1 September
Silver	Elizabeth Gomes	Athletics	Women's shot put F54	2 September
Silver	Débora Carneiro	Swimming	Women's 100 metre breaststroke SB14	2 September
Silver	Aser Mateus Ramos	Athletics	Men's long jump T36	2 September
Silver	Raíssa Machado	Athletics	Women's javelin throw F56	3 September
Silver	Rayane Soares	Athletics	Women's 100 metres T13	3 September
Silver	Bartolomeu Chaves	Athletics	Men's 400 metres T37	4 September
Silver	Patrícia Pereira	Swimming	Women's 50 metre breaststroke SB3	4 September
Silver	Douglas Matera; Matheus Rheine; Carolina Santiago; Lucilene Sousa	Swimming	Mixed 4 × 100 metre freestyle relay 49 pts	4 September
Silver	Wanna Helena Brito	Athletics	Women's shot put F32	4 September
Silver	Talisson Glock	Swimming	Men's 100 metre freestyle S6	5 September
Silver	Carolina Santiago	Swimming	Women's 100 metre breaststroke SB12	5 September
Silver	Cecília Jerônimo de Araújo	Swimming	Women's 50 metre freestyle S8	5 September
Silver	Brenda Souza	Judo	Women's 70 kg J1	6 September
Silver	Gabriel Bandeira	Swimming	Men's 100 metre backstroke S14	6 September
Silver	Zileide Cassiano da Silva	Athletics	Women's long jump T20	6 September
Silver	Thiago Paulino dos Santos	Athletics	Men's shot put F57	6 September
Silver	Ricardo Mendonça	Athletics	Men's 200 metres T37	7 September
Silver	Luis Carlos Cardoso	Paracanoeing	Men's KL1	7 September
Silver	Erika Zoaga	Judo	Women's +70 kg J1	7 September
Silver	Igor Tofalini	Paracanoeing	Men's VL2	8 September
Bronze	Gabriel Bandeira	Swimming	Men's 100 metre butterfly S14	29 August
Bronze	Yeltsin Jacques	Athletics	Men's 5000 metres T11	30 August
Bronze	Cátia Oliveira; Joyce Oliveira	Table tennis	Women's doubles WD5	30 August
Bronze	Talisson Glock	Swimming	Men's 200 metre individual medley SM6	30 August
Bronze	Giovanna Boscolo	Athletics	Women's club throw F32	30 August
Bronze	Talisson Glock; Patrícia Pereira; Lídia Vieira da Cruz; Daniel Xavier; Samuel de Oliveira	Swimming	Mixed 4 × 50 metre freestyle relay 20 pts	30 August
Bronze	Silvana Fernandes	Taekwondo	Women's 57 kg	30 August
Bronze	Bruna Alexandre; Danielle Rauen	Table tennis	Women's doubles WD20	31 August
Bronze	Luiz Manara; Claudio Massad	Table tennis	Men's doubles MD18	31 August
Bronze	Maria Clara Augusto	Athletics	Women's 400 metres T47	31 August
Bronze	Cícero Nobre	Athletics	Men's javelin throw F57	31 August
Bronze	Lídia Vieira da Cruz	Swimming	Women's 150 metre individual medley SM4	1 September
Bronze	Arthur Xavier Ribeiro; Gabriel Bandeira; Beatriz Carneiro; Ana Karolina Soares	Swimming	Mixed 4 × 100 metre freestyle relay S14	1 September
Bronze	André Rocha	Athletics	Men's discus throw F52	1 September
Bronze	Beatriz Carneiro	Swimming	Women's 100 metre breaststroke SB14	2 September
Bronze	Vinícius Rodrigues	Athletics	Men's 100 metres T63	2 September
Bronze	Vitor Tavares	Badminton	Men's singles SH6	2 September
Bronze	Júlio Cesar Agripino	Athletics	Men's 1500 metres T11	3 September
Bronze	Bruna Alexandre	Table tennis	Women's singles WS10	3 September
Bronze	Mariana Ribeiro	Swimming	Women's 100 metre backstroke S9	3 September
Bronze	Mayara Petzold	Swimming	Women's 50 metre butterfly S6	3 September
Bronze	Lorena Spoladore	Athletics	Women's 100 metres T11	3 September
Bronze	Mateus Evangelista	Athletics	Men's long jump T37	3 September
Bronze	Lara Aparecida de Lima	Powerlifting	Women's 41 kg	4 September
Bronze	Verônica Hipólito	Athletics	Women's 100 metres T36	4 September
Bronze	Ariosvaldo Fernandes	Athletics	Men's 100 metres T53	4 September
Bronze	Mariana Ribeiro	Swimming	Women's 100 metre backstroke S9	4 September
Bronze	Brazil men's national goalball team: André Dantas; Emerson Ernesto; Romário Marques; Leomon Moreno; Paulo Saturnino; Josemárcio Sousa	Goalball	Men's tournament	5 September
Bronze	Rosicleide Andrade	Judo	Women's 48 kg J1	5 September
Bronze	Antônia Keyla da Silva	Athletics	Women's 1500 metres T20	6 September
Bronze	Maria de Fátima Castro	Powerlifting	Women's 67 kg	6 September
Bronze	Christian Gabriel Costa	Athletics	Men's 200 metres T37	7 September
Bronze	Paulo Henrique Andrade	Athletics	Men's long jump T13	7 September
Bronze	Miquéias Rodrigues	Paracanoeing	Men's KL3	7 September
Bronze	Marcelo Casanova	Judo	Men's 90 kg J2	7 September
Bronze	Brazil national blind football team: Luan Gonçalves; Maicon Júnior; Cássio Lopes; Jonatan da Silva; Jeferson Gonçalves; Raimundo Nonato; Tiago da Silva; Ricardo Alves; Jardiel Soares; Matheus Bumussa	Blind football	Men's tournament	7 September
Bronze	Lídia Vieira da Cruz	Swimming	Women's 50 metre backstroke S4	7 September
Bronze	Thomaz Ruan de Moraes	Athletics	Men's 400 metres T47	7 September

Medals by sport
Sport	1st place, gold medalist(s)	2nd place, silver medalist(s)	3rd place, bronze medalist(s)	Total
Athletics	10	11	15	36
Swimming	7	9	10	26
Judo	4	2	2	8
Powerlifting	2	0	2	4
Paracanoeing	1	2	1	4
Taekwondo	1	0	1	2
Shooting	0	1	0	1
Table tennis	0	0	4	3
Badminton	0	0	1	1
Blind football	0	0	1	1
Goalball	0	0	1	1
Total	25	25	38	88

Medals by gender
Gender	1st place, gold medalist(s)	2nd place, silver medalist(s)	3rd place, bronze medalist(s)	Total
Female	13	12	18	43
Male	12	11	18	42
Mixed	0	2	2	4
Total	25	25	38	88

Medals by day
Day	1st place, gold medalist(s)	2nd place, silver medalist(s)	3rd place, bronze medalist(s)	Total
29 August	1	1	1	3
30 August	4	0	5	9
31 August	3	3	5	11
1 September	0	1	3	4
2 September	4	3	3	10
3 September	2	2	6	10
4 September	1	4	4	9
5 September	0	3	2	5
6 September	2	4	2	8
7 September	6	3	7	16
8 September	2	1	0	3
Total	25	25	38	88

=== Multiple medallists ===
The following competitor won multiple medals at the 2024 Paralympic Games.

Name	Medal	Sport	Event
Carolina Santiago	Gold; Gold; Gold; Silver; Silver	Swimming	Women's 100 metre backstroke S12; Women's 50 metre freestyle S13; Women's 100 metre freestyle S12; Mixed 4 × 100 metre freestyle relay 49 pts Women's 100 metre breaststroke SB12
Gabriel Araújo	Gold; Gold; Gold	Swimming	Men's 100 metre backstroke S2; Men's 50 metre backstroke S2; Men's 200 metre freestyle S2
Ricardo Mendonça	Gold; Silver	Athletics	Men's 100 metres T37; Men's 200 metres T37
Júlio Cesar Agripino	Gold; Bronze	Athletics	Men's 5000 metres T11; Men's 1500 metres T11
Yeltsin Jacques	Gold; Bronze	Athletics	Men's 1500 metres T11; Men's 5000 metres T11
Bruna Alexandre	Bronze; Bronze	Table tennis	Women's doubles WD20; Women's singles WS10

== Competitors ==
The following is the list of number of competitors in the Games. Note that reserves in some sports are not counted:

Sport	Men	Women	Total
Archery	3	2	5
Athletics	38	33	71
Badminton	2	1	3
Blind football	10	—N/a	10
Boccia	5	4	9
Cycling	3	3	6
Equestrian	2	0	2
Goalball	6	6	12
Judo	7	8	15
Paracanoeing	4	4	8
Paratriathlon	1	2	3
Powerlifting	4	7	11
Rowing	3	4	7
Shooting	2	0	2
Sitting volleyball	12	12	24
Swimming	21	16	37
Table tennis	6	9	15
Taekwondo	2	4	6
Wheelchair fencing	4	3	7
Wheelchair tennis	4	0	4
Total	138	117	255

== Archery ==
Brazilian para-archers secured a quota place in the mixed team compound, men's W1 and men's recurve, event by virtue of their result at the 2023 World Para Archery Championships in Plzeň, Czech Republic and 2023 Parapan American Games in Santiago, Chile; and at the 2024 World Qualification Tournament in Dubai, United Arab Emirates.

Men

Athlete	Event	Ranking Round		Round of 32	Round of 16	Quarterfinals	Semifinals	Finals	
Athlete	Event	Score	Seed	Opposition Score	Opposition Score	Opposition Score	Opposition Score	Opposition Score	Rank
Eugênio Franco	Individual W1	627	11	—N/a	Tabansky (USA); L 135–142	Did not advance			
Reinaldo Charão	Individual compound open	685	20	Meier (AUT); L 122–137	Did not advance				
Luciano Rezende	Individual recurve open	495	29	Savaş (TUR); L 0–6	Did not advance				

Women

Athlete	Event	Ranking Round		Round of 32	Round of 16	Quarterfinals	Semifinals	Finals	
Athlete	Event	Score	Seed	Opposition Score	Opposition Score	Opposition Score	Opposition Score	Opposition Score	Rank
Juliana Ferreira	Individual W1	503	11	—N/a	Kingstone (GBR); L 77–128	Did not advance			9
Jane Karla Gögel	Individual compound open	691	5	Bantiloc (PHI); W 143–127	Zhou (CHN); W 139–136	Grinham (GBR); L 141–143	Did not advance		5

Mixed

Athlete	Event	Ranking Round		Round of 16	Quarterfinals	Semifinals	Finals	
Athlete	Event	Score	Seed	Opposition Score	Opposition Score	Opposition Score	Opposition Score	Rank
Eugênio Franco; Juliana Ferreira	Team W1	1130	7	—N/a	Czech Republic (CZE); L 121–144	Did not advance		7
Reinaldo Charão; Jane Karla Gogel	Team compound	1376	5	Costa Rica (CRC); W DNS	Iran (IRI); L 151–153	Did not advance		6

== Athletics ==
Brazilian track and field parathletes achieved quota places for the following events based on their results at the 2023 World Championships, 2024 World Championships, or through high performance allocation, as long as they meet the minimum entry standard (MES). The full roster was announced on 11 July 2024.

Key

- Note–Ranks given for track events are within the athlete's heat only
- Q = Qualified for the next round
- q = Qualified for the next round as a fastest loser or, in field events, by position without achieving the qualifying target
- DQ = Disqualified
- PR = Paralympic Record
- AR = Area (or continental) Record
- NR = National Record
- SB = Season's Best
- N/A = Round not applicable for the event
- Bye = Athlete not required to compete in round

Track & road events

Men

Athlete	Event	Heat		Semifinal		Final	
Athlete	Event	Result	Rank	Result	Rank	Result	Rank
Felipe Gomes	100 m T11	11.69	3	Did not advance			
Daniel Mendes	100 m T11	11.73	3	Did not advance			
Marcos Vinicius de Oliveira	100 m T12	11.61	3	Did not advance			
Joeferson Marinho	100 m T12	11.01	2 q	—N/a		10.84	2nd place, silver medalist(s)
Kesley Teodoro	100 m T12	11.16	2	Did not advance			
Fábio Bordignon	100 m T35	—N/a				12.41	8
Henrique Nascimento	100 m T35	—N/a				11.85	4
Aser Mateus Ramos	100 m T36	12.45	3 Q	—N/a		12.38	7
Christian Gabriel Luiz	100 m T37	11.38	3 Q	—N/a		11.45	4
Ricardo Mendonça	100 m T37	11.07	1 Q	—N/a		11.07	1st place, gold medalist(s)
Edson Pinheiro	100 m T37	11.33	1 Q	—N/a		11.47	5
Matheus de Lima	100 m T44	—N/a				12.15	9
Petrúcio Ferreira	100 m T47	10.90	2 Q	—N/a		10.68	1st place, gold medalist(s)
Washington Júnior	100 m T47	10.83	4 q	—N/a		10.86	5
Lucas Pereira	100 m T47	10.84	5 q	—N/a		10.93	=6
Ariosvaldo Fernandes	100 m T53	15.19	1 Q	—N/a		15.08	3rd place, bronze medalist(s)
Vinícius Rodrigues	100 m T63	12.24	3 Q	—N/a		12.10	3rd place, bronze medalist(s)
Wallison Fortes	100 m T64	11.43	7	Did not advance			
Alan Fonteles	100 m T64	11.22	5 q	—N/a		11.22	8
Fábio Bordignon	200 m T35	—N/a				29.71	9
Henrique Nascimento	200 m T35	—N/a				24.14	4
Bartolomeu Chaves	200 m T37	23.53	2 Q	—N/a		23.22	4
Christian Gabriel Luiz	200 m T37	23.05	1 Q	—N/a		22.74	3rd place, bronze medalist(s)
Ricardo Mendonça	200 m T37	23.51	4 q	—N/a		22.71	2nd place, silver medalist(s)
Wallison Fortes	200 m T64	22.81	3 Q	—N/a		22.84	4
Matheus de Lima	200 m T64	DNS		Did not advance			
Felipe Gomes	400 m T11	52.92	3 q	52.85	4	Did not advance	
Daniel Mendes	400 m T11	53.03	3	Did not advance			
Marcos Vinicius de Oliveira	400 m T12	50.42	2	Did not advance			
Samuel Oliveira	400 m T20	—N/a				48.59	5
Daniel Martins	400 m T20	—N/a				48.91	8
Bartolomeu Chaves	400 m T37	52.34	1 Q	—N/a		50.39	2nd place, silver medalist(s)
Petrúcio Ferreira	400 m T47	50.27	6	Did not advance			
Lucas Lima	400 m T47	50.68	7	Did not advance			
Thomaz Ruan de Moraes	400 m T47	48.68	2 Q	—N/a		47.97	3rd place, bronze medalist(s)
Ariosvaldo Fernandes	400 m T53	51.35	5 q	—N/a		52.42	8
Alan Fonteles	400 m T62	—N/a				50.30	5
Júlio Cesar Agripino	1500 m T11	—N/a				4:04.03	3rd place, bronze medalist(s)
Yeltsin Jacques	1500 m T11	—N/a				3:55.82	1st place, gold medalist(s)
Júlio Cesar Agripino	5000 m T11	—N/a				14:48.85	1st place, gold medalist(s)
Yeltsin Jacques	5000 m T11	—N/a				14:52.61	3rd place, bronze medalist(s)

Women

Athlete	Event	Heat		Semifinal		Final	
Athlete	Event	Result	Rank	Result	Rank	Result	Rank
Jerusa Geber	100 m T11	12.57	1 Q	11.80	1 Q	11.83	1st place, gold medalist(s)
Jhulia Karol dos Santos	100 m T11	12.56	3 q	12.58	4	Did not advance	
Lorena Spoladore	100 m T11	12.11	1 Q	12.07	1 Q	12.14	3rd place, bronze medalist(s)
Viviane Ferreira	100 m T12	12.73	2	Did not advance			
Lorraine Gomes	100 m T12	12.93	4	Did not advance			
Clara Daniele Barros	100 m T12	12.66	3	Did not advance			
Samira da Silva	100 m T36	14.86	2 Q	—N/a		DSQ	
Verônica Hipólito	100 m T36	14.38	2 Q	—N/a		14.24	3rd place, bronze medalist(s)
Maria Clara Augusto	100 m T47	12.63	4 q	—N/a		12.63	7
Fernanda Yara da Silva	100 m T47	12.64	5	Did not advance			
Jéssica Giacomelli	100 m T54	17.04	6	Did not advance			
Jerusa Geber	200 m T11	25.00	1 Q	—N/a		24.51	1st place, gold medalist(s)
Lorena Spoladore	200 m T11	26.02	3	Did not advance			
Thalita Simplício	200 m T11	25.70	3	Did not advance			
Viviane Ferreira	200 m T12	27.47	3	Did not advance			
Lorraine Gomes	200 m T12	26.65	3 q	26.55	4	Did not advance	
Clara Daniele Barros	200 m T12	26.31	2 q	26.31	4	Did not advance	
Verônica Hipólito	200 m T36	30.80	3 Q	—N/a		31.03	7
Samira da Silva	200 m T36	30.96	3 Q	—N/a		31.01	6
Fernanda Yara da Silva	200 m T47	25.66	1 Q	—N/a		25.35	4
Maria Clara Augusto	200 m T47	25.53	3 q	—N/a		25.71	5
Camila Muller	400 m T11	1:05.47	3	Did not advance			
Jhulia Karol dos Santos	400 m T11	DSQ		Did not advance			
Thalita Simplício	400 m T11	58.96	1 Q	58.56	1 Q	57.21	2nd place, silver medalist(s)
Lorraine Gomes	400 m T12	59.99	2	Did not advance			
Clara Daniele Barros	400 m T12	58.77	2 q	59.07	4	Did not advance	
Ketyla Teodoro	400 m T12	58.86	3 q	58.94	4	Did not advance	
Rayane Soares	400 m T13	56.44	1 Q	—N/a		53.55	1st place, gold medalist(s)
Antônia Keyla da Silva	400 m T20	57.54	3 Q	—N/a		58.34	7
Fernanda Yara da Silva	400 m T47	57.56	1 Q	—N/a		56.74	1st place, gold medalist(s)
Maria Clara Augusto	400 m T47	59.28	3 Q	—N/a		57.20	3rd place, bronze medalist(s)
Jéssica Giacomelli	400 m T54	56.29	5	Did not advance			
Vanessa de Souza	800 m T54	1:50.29	5	Did not advance			
Jéssica Giacomelli	800 m T54	1:59.55	7	Did not advance			
Aline Rocha	800 m T54	1:53.04	7	Did not advance			
Camilla Muller	1500 m T11	5:03.01	4	Did not advance			
Edneusa Dorta	1500 m T13	—N/a				5:16.28	10
Antônia Keyla da Silva	1500 m T20	—N/a				4:29.40	3rd place, bronze medalist(s)
Aline Rocha	1500 m T54	3:35.18	5 Q	—N/a		3:23.43	9
Vanessa de Souza	1500 m T54	3:30.86	8	Did not advance			
Aline Rocha	5000 m T54	12:55.50	6	Did not advance			
Vanessa de Souza	5000 m T54	DNF		Did not advance			
Edneusa Dorta	Marathon T12	—N/a				3:17:40	7
Aline Rocha	Marathon T54	—N/a				1:53:54	8
Vanessa de Souza	Marathon T54	—N/a				1:56:33	10

Mixed

Athlete	Event	Heat		Final	
Athlete	Event	Result	Rank	Result	Rank
Lorena Spoladore; Washington Júnior; Verônica Hipólito; Ariosvaldo Fernandes	4 × 100 m metres relay	51.19	3	Did not advance	

Field events

Men

Athlete	Event	Final	
Athlete	Event	Distance	Position
Paulo Henrique Andrade	Long jump T13	7.20	3rd place, bronze medalist(s)
Paulo Cezar Neto	Long jump T20	6.60	9
Aser Mateus Ramos	Long jump T36	5.76	2nd place, silver medalist(s)
Rodrigo Parreira	Long jump T36	5.60	6
Mateus Evangelista	Long jump T37	6.20	3rd place, bronze medalist(s)
Alessandro Silva	Shot put F11	12.86	5
Eduardo Pereira	Shot put F34	11.03	6
Emanoel Oliveira	Shot put F37	14.52	4
Wallace Santos	Shot put F55	11.68	4
Thiago Paulino	Shot put F57	15.06	2nd place, silver medalist(s)
Edenilson Floriani	Shot put F63	14.57	4
Alessandro Silva	Discus throw F11	38.84	5
André Rocha	Discus throw F52	19.48	3rd place, bronze medalist(s)
Claudiney Batista	Discus throw F56	46.86	1st place, gold medalist(s)
Eduardo Pereira	Javelin throw F34	25.12	8
Cícero Nobre	Javelin throw F57	49.46	3rd place, bronze medalist(s)
Edenilson Floriani	Javelin throw F64	57.99	8

Women

Athlete	Event	Qualification		Final	
Athlete	Event	Distance	Position	Distance	Position
Alice Côrrea	Long jump T11	—N/a		4.38	6
Lorena Spoladore	Long jump T11	—N/a		3.67	11
Zileide Cassiano	Long jump T20	—N/a		5.76	2nd place, silver medalist(s)
Jardênia Félix	Long jump T20	—N/a		5.57	5
Débora Oliveira	Long jump T20	—N/a		5.49	6
Izabela Campos	Shot put F12	—N/a		9.91	6
Wanna Helena Brito	Shot put F32	—N/a		7.89	2nd place, silver medalist(s)
Giovanna Boscolo	Shot put F32	—N/a		5.61	9
Marivana Oliveira	Shot put F35	—N/a		7.94	8
Suzana Nahirnei	Shot put F46	—N/a		11.43	5
Elizabeth Gomes	Shot put F54	—N/a		7.82	2nd place, silver medalist(s)
Julyana Cristina da Silva	Shot put F57	—N/a		9.61	6
Izabela Campos	Discus throw F11	—N/a		34.94	4
Elizabeth Gomes	Discus throw F53	—N/a		17.37	1st place, gold medalist(s)
Julyana Cristina da Silva	Discus throw F57	24.75	1 Q	25.97	9
Raíssa Machado	Javelin throw F56	—N/a		23.51	2nd place, silver medalist(s)
Giovanna Boscolo	Club throw F32	—N/a		26.01	3rd place, bronze medalist(s)
Wanna Helena Brito	Club throw F32	—N/a		23.47	5

== Badminton ==
Brazil has qualified three para-badminton players for the following events, through the release of BWF para-badminton Race to Paris Paralympic Ranking.

Athlete	Event	Group Stage				Quarterfinal	Semifinal	Final / BM	
Athlete	Event	Opposition Score	Opposition Score	Opposition Score	Rank	Opposition Score	Opposition Score	Opposition Score	Rank
Rogério de Oliveira	Men's singles SL4	Dhillon (IND); L (17–21, 19–21)	Mazur (FRA); L (9–21, 7–21)	—N/a	3	Did not advance			
Vitor Tavares	Men's singles SH6	Noakes (FRA); L (19–21, 16–21)	Shephard (GBR); L (19–21, 21–15, 19–21)	Lin (CHN); W (21–15, 21–15)	2 Q	Krajewski (USA); W (21–12, 10–21, 23–21)	Noakes (FRA); L (18–21, 20–22)	Bronze medal final Chu (HKG); W (23–21, 16–21, 21–12)	3rd place, bronze medalist(s)
Daniele Souza	Women's singles WH1	Pookkham (THA); L (3–21, 11–21)	Chokyu (CAN); W (21–16, 15–21, 21–7)	Hu (TPE); L (17–21, 11–21)	3	Did not advance			

== Blind football ==
The Brazilian men's blind football team qualified for the paralympic games by virtue of top three nation's, not yet qualified, at the 2023 IBSA World Games in Birmingham, Great Britain.

Summary

Team	Event	Group Stage				Semifinals	Final / BM	
Team	Event	Opposition Score	Opposition Score	Opposition Score	Rank	Opposition Score	Opposition Score	Rank
Brazil men's	Men's tournament	Turkey; W 3–0	France; W 3–0	China; D 0–0	1 Q	Argentina; L 0–0 (3–4 p)	Colombia; W 1–0	3rd place, bronze medalist(s)

Team roster

Coach: Fábio Vasconcelos

The following is the Brazil squad in the football 5-a-side tournament of the 2024 Summer Paralympics. The roster was announced on 25 June 2024.

No.	Pos.	Player	Class	Date of birth (age)
1	GK	Luan Gonçalves	Sighted	6 January 1993 (aged 31)
4	DF	Maicon Júnior	B1	1 June 2000 (aged 24)
5	DF	Cássio Lopes	B1	15 May 1989 (aged 35)
6	FW	Jonatan Borges da Silva	B1	15 August 1998 (aged 26)
7	FW	Jefinho	B1	5 October 1989 (aged 34)
8	FW	Nonato	B1	19 August 1987 (aged 37)
9	FW	Tiago da Silva	B1	28 September 1995 (aged 28)
10	FW	Ricardo Alves	B1	15 December 1988 (aged 35)
11	FW	Jardiel Soares	B1	26 July 1996 (aged 28)
12	GK	Matheus Bumussa	Sighted	3 October 1994 (aged 29)

Group stage

Pos	Team	Pld	W	D	L	GF	GA	GD	Pts	Qualification
1	Brazil	3	2	1	0	6	0	+6	7	Semi-finals
2	France (H)	3	2	0	1	3	3	0	6	Semi-finals
3	China	3	1	1	1	2	1	+1	4	Fifth place match
4	Turkey	3	0	0	3	0	7	−7	0	Seventh place match

Source: Paris 2024
(H) Hosts
1 September 2024
18:30

Brazil	3–0	Turkey
Nonato 6' (pen.), 21' (pen.); Gonçalves 20'	Report

Eiffel Tower Stadium, Paris
Attendance: 9,160
Referee: Jose Alfredo Martinez Ibarra (Mexico)

2 September 2024
20:30

France	0–3	Brazil
	Report	Alves 14'; Soares 15' (pen.); Nonato 27'

Eiffel Tower Stadium, Paris
Attendance: 10,580
Referee: Tom Jozef de Bruyne (Belgium)

3 September 2024
18:30

China	0–0	Brazil
	Report

Eiffel Tower Stadium, Paris
Attendance: 10,580
Referee: Germinal Dante Lubrano (Argentina)

Semi-finals

5 September 2024
20:00

Brazil	0–0	Argentina
	Report
Penalties
Maicon (penalty scored); Lopes (penalty missed); Nonato (penalty scored); da Silva (penalty missed); Soares (penalty scored); Alves (penalty missed)	3–4	(penalty scored) Espinillo; (penalty missed) Ríos; (penalty scored) Heredia; (penalty missed) Padilla; (penalty scored) Olivera; (penalty scored) Fernández

Eiffel Tower Stadium, Paris
Attendance: 11,630
Referee: François Carcouët (France)

Bronze medal match

7 September 2024
17:30

Colombia	0–1	Brazil
	Report	Jefinho 24'

Eiffel Tower Stadium, Paris
Attendance: 11,679
Referee: François Carcouët (France)

== Boccia ==
Brazil entered full-squad of seven boccia players into the Paralympics games, by virtue of their result as the highest rank nation's in the BC1/BC2 team event, at the 2023 Parapan American Games in Santiago, Chile; winning the gold medal in the mixed pairs event for BC3, at the 2024 Paralympic Qualification Tournament in Coimbra, Portugal; and by nominated as one of four highest eligible ranked nations in the BC3 pairs event, through the final world ranking.

Men

Athlete	Event	Pool matches				Playoffs	Quarterfinals	Semifinals	Final / BM	
Athlete	Event	Opposition Score	Opposition Score	Opposition Score	Rank	Opposition Score	Opposition Score	Opposition Score	Opposition Score	Rank
José Carlos Chagas	Individual BC1	Smith (GBR); L 2–5	Perez (NED); L 5–6	—N/a	3	—N/a	Did not advance			10
Maciel Santos	Individual BC2	Tayahi (TUN); W 8–0 (DNS)	Dekker (NED); W 7–2	Levi (ISR); W 8–0	1 Q	Bye	Vongsa (THA); L 3–3*	Did not advance		5
Iuri Tauan Silva	Individual BC2	Araújo (POR); L 0–8	Cristaldo (ARG); L 2–5	Fabre (FRA); W 6–2	3	Did not advance				15
Mateus Carvalho	Individual BC3	Arita (JPN); L 4–5	Menard (FRA); L 4–5	Polychronidis (GRE); W 4–1	4	—N/a	Did not advance			13
André Costa	Individual BC4	Leung (HKG); L 1–8	Uchida (JPN); L 2–8	Zheng (CHN); L 0–7	4	—N/a	Did not advance			15

Women

Athlete	Event	Pool matches				Quarterfinals	Semifinals	Final / BM	
Athlete	Event	Opposition Score	Opposition Score	Opposition Score	Rank	Opposition Score	Opposition Score	Opposition Score	Rank
Andreza de Oliveira	Individual BC1	Flores (ARG); W 5–2	Fujii (JPN); L 1–6	—N/a	2 Q	Tan (SGP); L 5–7	Did not advance		6
Evani Calado	Individual BC3	Costa (POR); W 8–2	Ho (HKG); L 4–5	Jordaan (RSA); W 5–0	2 Q	Owczarz (POL); W 5–1	Leeson (AUS); L 1–7	Bronze medal final Kang S-h (KOR); L 2–7	4
Evelyn de Oliveira	Individual BC3	Kidson (GBR); L 1–5	Kang S-h (KOR); L 0–7	Leeson (AUS); L 3–4	4	Did not advance			14
Laissa Teixeira	Individual BC4	Oliveira (POR); L 2–4	Szabo (HUN); W 4–3	Raguwaran (GER); W 4–2	2 Q	Cheung (HKG); L 1–4	Did not advance		7

Mixed

Athlete	Event	Pool matches			Quarterfinals	Semifinals	Final / BM	
Athlete	Event	Opposition Score	Opposition Score	Rank	Opposition Score	Opposition Score	Opposition Score	Rank
Mateus Carvalho; Evelyn de Oliveira	Pairs BC3	South Africa (RSA); W 7–0	Greece (GRE); L 1–4	2 Q	Hong Kong (HKG); L 1–3	Did not advance		7
André Costa; Laissa Teixeira	Pairs BC4	Egypt (EGY); L 2–2*	Hong Kong (HKG); L 2–9	3	Did not advance			10
Maciel Santos; Iuri Tauan Silva; Andreza de Oliveira	Team BC1–2	Slovakia (SVK); L 5–6	Thailand (THA); W 7–3	2 Q	Japan (JPN); L 4–4*	Did not advance		6

== Cycling ==
Brazilian para-cyclists qualified for the games based on the 2022 UCI Nations' ranking allocation to send one male and one female. The full roster was announced on 11 July 2024.

=== Road ===
Men

Athlete	Event	Result	Rank
Ulisses Freitas	Road race H4	1:45:42	7
Ulisses Freitas	Time trial H4	49:39.70	11
Carlos Alberto Gomes	Road race C1–3	2:07:48	23
Carlos Alberto Gomes	Time trial C1	23:23.52	7
Lauro Chaman	Road race C4–5	2:25:58	5
Lauro Chaman	Time trial C5	36:59.51	4

Women

Athlete	Event	Result	Rank
Jady Malavazzi	Road race H1–4	56:52	6
Jady Malavazzi	Time trial H1–3	26:34.29	4
Mariana Garcia	Road race H1–4	1:09:54	14
Mariana Garcia	Time trial H1–3	31:30.42	8
Sabrina Custódia	Road race C1–3	2:08:24	14
Sabrina Custódia	Time trial C1–3	27:04.65	15

Mixed

Athlete	Event	Result	Rank
Ulisses Freitas; Mariana Garcia; Jady Malavazzi	Team relay H1–5	27:23	4

=== Track ===
Men

Athlete	Event	Qualification		Final	
Athlete	Event	Time	Rank	Opposition Time	Rank
Carlos Alberto Gomes	Pursuit C1	4:18.908	7	Did not advance	
Lauro Chaman	Time trial C4–5	1:10.393	20	Did not advance	
Lauro Chaman	Pursuit C5	4:21.768	5	Did not advance	

Women

Athlete	Event	Qualification		Final	
Athlete	Event	Time	Rank	Opposition Time	Rank
Sabrina Custódia	Time trial C1–3	39.345	6 Q	39.197	6

== Equestrian ==
Brazil entered two para-equestrians into the Paralympic equestrian competition, by virtue of the nations individual final world para dressage rankings.

Individual

Athlete	Horse	Event	Qualification		Final	
Athlete	Horse	Event	Score	Rank	Score	Rank
Sérgio Oliva	Milenium	Individual championship test grade I	—N/a		66.667	16
Sérgio Oliva	Milenium	Individual freestyle test grade I	66.667	16	Did not advance	
Rodolpho Riskalla	Denzel	Individual championship test grade V	—N/a		69.615	7
Rodolpho Riskalla	Denzel	Individual freestyle test grade V	69.615	7 Q	DNS	

== Goalball ==
Summary

Team	Event	Group Stage				Quarterfinal	Semifinal	Final / BM	
Team	Event	Opposition Score	Opposition Score	Opposition Score	Rank	Opposition Score	Opposition Score	Opposition Score	Rank
Brazil men's	Men's tournament	France; W 8–5	United States; W 13–8	Iran; D 7–7	1 Q	Egypt; W 10–0	Ukraine; L 4–6	China; W 5–3	3rd place, bronze medalist(s)
Brazil women's	Women's tournament	Turkey; D 3–3	Israel; L 4–8	China; L 1–3	4 Q	Japan; W 2–0	Turkey; L 1–3	China; L 0–6	4

=== Men's tournament ===
The Brazilian men's goalball team qualified for the Paralympic games after being the champion at 2022 IBSA Goalball World Championships in Matosinhos, Portugal.

Team roster

Coach: Jonatas Castro

The following is the Brazil squad in the goalball tournament of the 2024 Summer Paralympics. The roster was announced on 25 June 2024.

No.	Player	Class	Date of birth (age)
3	Paulo Saturnino	B2	1 June 1998 (aged 26)
4	Leomon Moreno	B1	21 August 1993 (aged 31)
5	Josemárcio Sousa	B3	20 July 1989 (aged 35)
6	Romário Marques	B1	20 July 1989 (aged 35)
7	Emerson Ernesto	B3	11 February 1999 (aged 25)
9	André Dantas	B3	19 May 1995 (aged 29)

Group stage

Pos	Team	Pld	W	D	L	GF	GA	GD	Pts	Qualification
1	Brazil	3	2	1	0	28	20	+8	7	Quarter-finals
2	United States	3	2	0	1	27	24	+3	6	Quarter-finals
3	Iran	3	1	1	1	26	29	−3	4	Quarter-finals
4	France (H)	3	0	0	3	17	25	−8	0	Quarter-finals

Source: Paris 2024
(H) Hosts
29 August 2024
17:30

Brazil	8–5	France
Dantas 1', 4', 5', 8'; Sousa 4'; Moreno 14'; Marques 15', 16'	Report	Ouni 1', 1'; Boualia 5'; Baich 11'; Daudin 17'

South Paris Arena, Paris
Referee:
Azhi Mahmood (Iraq)
Manar Obeidat (Jordan)

30 August 2024
09:00

United States	8–13	Brazil
Young 5', 6', 7', 8', 12', 22'; Merren 7'; King 10'	Report	Moreno 3', 5', 6', 9', 14'; Ernesto 6', 10', 15'; Dantas 8', 13', 14'; Sousa 21'; Saturnino 22'

South Paris Arena, Paris
Referee:
Kazuto Ono (Japan)
Antonios Christodoulos (Greece)

31 August 2024
17:30

Brazil	7–7	Iran
Dantas 0', 2', 6', 19'; Sousa 12'; Moreno 14'; Ernesto 22'	Report	Sarafraz 4', 17', 22', 23'; Souri 17', 21', 23'

South Paris Arena, Paris
Referee:
Patrik Larsson (Sweden)
Juha Vuokila (Finland)

Quarter-finals

2 September 2024
13:15

Brazil	10–0	Egypt
Moreno 4', 6'; Ernesto 9', 15'; Sousa 10', 12', 14'; Dantas 11', 17'; Saturnino 17'	Report

South Paris Arena, Paris
Referee:
Antonios Christodoulos (Greece)
Sarah Kuper (Germany)

Semi-finals

4 September 2024
13:30

Brazil	4–6	Ukraine
Sousa 0'; Moreno 0' (pen.), 18', 21'	Report	Strelchyk 0'; Oliinyk 2', 10', 15', 21' (pen.), 21'

South Paris Arena, Paris
Referee:
Azhi Mahmood (Iraq)
Kazuto Ono (Japan)

Bronze medal match

5 September 2024; 13:15	Brazil	5–3	China	South Paris Arena, Paris; Referees: Manar Obeidat (Jordan); Juha Vuokila (Finland)
5 September 2024; 13:15	Moreno 6', 13', 15'; Sousa 13', 15'	Report	Yang 15'; Yu Deyi 17', 22'	South Paris Arena, Paris; Referees: Manar Obeidat (Jordan); Juha Vuokila (Finland)

=== Women's tournament ===
The Brazilian women's goalball team qualified for the Paralympic games through the 2023 IBSA World Games in Birmingham, Great Britain.

Team roster

Coach: Alessandro Tosim

The following is the Brazil squad in the goalball tournament of the 2024 Summer Paralympics. The roster was announced on 25 June 2024.

No.	Player	Class	Date of birth (age)
1	Geovana Moura	B2	23 June 1999 (aged 25)
2	Gabriely Brito	B3	15 August 1990 (aged 34)
5	Moniza de Lima	B2	16 April 1998 (aged 26)
6	Kátia Silva	B1	24 April 1995 (aged 29)
7	Danielle Longhini	B1	22 February 2001 (aged 23)
8	Jéssica Vitorino	B3	22 July 1993 (aged 31)

Group stage

Pos	Team	Pld	W	D	L	GF	GA	GD	Pts	Qualification
1	China	3	3	0	0	16	7	+9	9	Quarter-finals
2	Turkey	3	1	1	1	13	14	−1	4	Quarter-finals
3	Israel	3	1	0	2	13	15	−2	3	Quarter-finals
4	Brazil	3	0	1	2	8	14	−6	1	Quarter-finals

Source: Paris 2024
Rules for classification: 1) points; 2) goal difference; 3) number of wins; 4) goals against; 5) head-to-head goal difference.
29 August 2024
10:30

Turkey	3–3	Brazil
Sevd. Altunoluk 2', 4', 22'	Report	de Lima 0', 7'; Vitorino 12'

South Paris Arena, Paris
Referee:
Romualdas Vaitekus (Lithuania)
Janice Dawson (Canada)

30 August 2024
10:30

Brazil	4–8	Israel
Vitorino 11', 18'; de Lima 13'; Moura 20'	Report	Mizrahi 8', 13', 16', 22'; Ben-David 8', 10', 16', 20'

South Paris Arena, Paris
Referee:
Patrik Larsson (Sweden)
Claude Dagenais (Canada)

31 August 2024
14:45

China	3–1	Brazil
Wang Chunyan 11', 19'; Cao 14'	Report	Lima 14'

South Paris Arena, Paris
Referee:
Raquel Aguado (Spain)
Manar Obeidat (Jordan)

Quarter-finals

3 September 2024
18:00

Japan	0–2	Brazil
	Report	Vitorino 0', 16'

South Paris Arena, Paris
Referee:
Juha Vuokila (Finland)
Romualdas Vaitiekus (Lithuania)

Semi-finals

4 September 2024
19:45

Brazil	1–3	Turkey
Vitorino 6'	Report	Güler 2'; Altunoluk 3', 8'

South Paris Arena, Paris
Referee:
Manar Obeidat (Jordan)
Juha Vuokila (Finland)

Bronze medal match

5 September 2024
15:00

China	6–0	Brazil
Cao 2', 12'; Wang Chunyan 3', 12', 13', 19'	Report

South Paris Arena, Paris
Referee:
Azhi Mahmood (Iraq)
Sarah Kuper (Germany)

== Judo ==
Brazil has qualified fifteen judokas for the following Paralympics events. Thirteen of them qualified for Paris 2024, by virtue of finishing within the top six in the Paralympic rankings in their respective class. And also secured two places under the bipartite invitation (one of the quotas not used by another continent).

The full roster was announced on 11 July 2024.

Men

Athlete	Event	Round of 16	Quarterfinals	Semifinals	Repechage 1	Repechage 2	Final / BM	
Athlete	Event	Opposition Result	Opposition Result	Opposition Result	Opposition Result	Opposition Result	Opposition Result	Rank
Elielton Lira	−60 kg J1	Bye	Bouamer (ALG); L 00–10	Did not advance	Kongsuk (THA); W 10–00	Vieira (POR); W 10–00	Bronze medal final Parmar (IND); L 00–10	5
Harlley Pereira	−73 kg J1	Camanni (ITA); W 10–01	Gauto (ARG); W 10–00	Bologa (ROM); L 00–01	Bye		Bronze medal final Iafa (POR); L 00–01	5
Arthur Cavalcante	−90 kg J1	Bye	Abdiev (UZB); W 10–00	Çimciler (TUR); W 11–00	—N/a	Bye	Powell (GBR); W 10–00	1st place, gold medalist(s)
Wilians Silva	+90 kg J1	Bye	Utepov (KAZ); W 10–00	Dashtseren (MGL); W 10–00	—N/a	Bye	Basoc (MDA); W 10–00	1st place, gold medalist(s)
Thiego Marques	−60 kg J2	Bye	Lee (KOR); L 00–10	Did not advance	—N/a	Gavilán (ESP); W 10–00	Bronze medal final Ouldkouider (ALG); L 00–10	5
Marcelo Casanova	−90 kg J2	Bye	Molloy (GBR); W 01–00	Latchoumanaya (FRA); L 00–11	—N/a	Bye	Bronze medal final Cannizzaro (ITA); W 01–00	3rd place, bronze medalist(s)
Sérgio Fernandes	+90 kg J2	Bye	Shukurbekov (KAZ); L 00–10	Did not advance	—N/a	Mantolas (INA); L 00–10	Did not advance	

Women

Athlete	Event	Round of 16	Quarterfinals	Semifinals	Repechage	Final / BM	
Athlete	Event	Opposition Result	Opposition Result	Opposition Result	Opposition Result	Opposition Result	Rank
Rosicleide Silva	−48 kg J1	—N/a	Togtokhbayaryn (MGL); W 10–00	Nikolaychyk (UKR); L 01–10	Bye	Bronze medal final Ledesma (ARG); W 10–00	3rd place, bronze medalist(s)
Larissa Oliveira	−57 kg J1	Manzanero (ESP); W 10–00	Gagne (CAN); L 00–10	Did not advance	Amrieva (UZB); L 01–11	Did not advance	
Brenda Souza	−70 kg J1	Bye	Uslu (TUR); W 10–00	Paschalidou (GRE); W 10–01	Bye	Liu (CHN); L 00–01	2nd place, silver medalist(s)
Erika Zoaga	+70 kg J1	—N/a	Sanabria (VEN); W 10–00	Güneş (TUR); W 11–00	Bye	Harnyk (UKR); L 00–10	2nd place, silver medalist(s)
Lúcia Teixeira	−57 kg J2	—N/a	Fedossova (KAZ); L 00–10	Did not advance	González (ARG); W 10–00	Bronze medal final Arce (ESP); L 00–10	5
Alana Maldonado	−70 kg J2	—N/a	Bye	Ogawa (JPN); W 10–00	—N/a	Wang (CHN); W 10–00	1st place, gold medalist(s)
Kelly Victório	−70 kg J2	—N/a	Kaldani (GEO); L 01–10	Did not advance	—N/a	Bronze medal final Ogawa (JPN); L 00–10	5
Rebeca de Souza	+70 kg J2	Bye	Karimova (AZE); W 10–00	Costa (ITA); W 10–01	Bye	Hernández (CUB); W 11–00	1st place, gold medalist(s)

== Paracanoeing ==
Brazilian paracanoeists earned quota places for the following events through the 2023 ICF Canoe Sprint World Championships in Duisburg, Germany; and 2024 ICF Canoe Sprint World Championships in Szeged, Hungary. The full roster was announced on 25 June 2024.

Men

Athlete	Event	Heats		Semifinal		Final	
Athlete	Event	Time	Rank	Time	Rank	Time	Rank
Luis Carlos Cardoso	KL1	49.12	1 FA	Bye		46.42	2nd place, silver medalist(s)
Fernando Rufino	KL2	44.18	4 SF	43.50	2 FA	42.90	6
Miquéias Rodrigues	KL3	42.36	3 SF	41.54	2 FA	40.75	3rd place, bronze medalist(s)
Fernando Rufino	VL2	53.40	1 FA	Bye		50.47	1st place, gold medalist(s)
Igor Tofalini	VL2	54.19	1 FA	Bye		51.78	2nd place, silver medalist(s)

Women

Athlete	Event	Heats		Semifinal		Final	
Athlete	Event	Time	Rank	Time	Rank	Time	Rank
Adriana Azevedo	KL1	1:01.93	5 SF	1:00.13	4	Did not advance	
Aline Oliveira	KL3	53.14	6 SF	52.66	5 FB	DSQ	
Mari Christina Santilli	KL3	54.51	6 SF	54.98	5 FB	52.66	11
Débora Benevides	VL2	1:04.62	2 SF	1:04.45	2 FA	1:04.29	5
Mari Christina Santilli	VL3	1:01.85	4 SF	59.92	2 FA	1:00.29	6

Qualification Legend: FA – Qualify to medal final; FB – Qualify to non-medal final; SF – Qualify to semifinal

== Paratriathlon ==
Brazil has qualified three paratriathletes for the following events.

Athlete	Event	Time						Rank
Athlete	Event	Swim (750 m)	Trans 1	Bike (20 km)	Trans 2	Run (5 km)	Total	Rank
Ronan Cordeiro	Men's PTS5	10:52	0:43	30:31	0:31	16:24	59:01	DSQ
Jéssica Messali	Women's PTWC	15:10	1:44	38:15	0:59	DNF		
Letícia Freitas	Women's PTVI	13:31	1:30	35:14	0:38	20:27	1:11:20	9

== Powerlifting ==
Brazil has qualified eleven powerlifters for the following Paralympics events.

Men

Athlete	Event	Attempts (kg)				Result	Rank
Athlete	Event	1	2	3	PL	Result	Rank
Ezequiel Correa	–72 kg	170	174	~~181~~	—N/a	174	8
Ailton Bento de Souza	–80 kg	~~187~~	~~187~~	187	—N/a	187	9
Evânio da Silva	–88 kg	181	187	~~193~~	—N/a	187	8
Mateus de Assis	–107 kg	208	~~212~~	212	—N/a	212	5

Women

Athlete	Event	Attempts (kg)				Result	Rank
Athlete	Event	1	2	3	PL	Result	Rank
Lara Aparecida de Lima	–41 kg	105	107	109	—N/a	109	3rd place, bronze medalist(s)
Maria Rizonaide	–50 kg	~~102~~	102	~~106~~	—N/a	102	6
Ana Paula Marques	–61 kg	101	~~105~~	105	—N/a	105	8
Maria de Fátima Castro	–67 kg	126	131	133	—N/a	133	3rd place, bronze medalist(s)
Mariana D'Andrea	–73 kg	141	143	148	~~152~~	148 PR	1st place, gold medalist(s)
Caroline Fernandes	–79 kg	124	128	~~133~~	—N/a	128	7
Tayana Medeiros	–86 kg	137	142	147	156	156 PR	1st place, gold medalist(s)

== Rowing ==
Brazilian para-rowers qualified boats in each of the following classes at the 2023 World Rowing Championships in Belgrade, Serbia; and 2024 Final Paralympic Qualification Regatta in Lucerne, Switzerland.

Athlete	Event	Heats		Repechage		Final	
Athlete	Event	Time	Rank	Time	Rank	Time	Rank
Cláudia Santos	PR1 women's single sculls	11:14.72	4 R	10:54.61	2 FA	12:12.86	6
Jairo Klug; Diana Barcelos	PR3 mixed double sculls	7:40.91	3 R	7:24.24	1 FA	7:45.02	5
Erik Lima; Gabriel Mendes; Priscila Barreto; Alina Dumas; Jucelino da Silva (cox)	PR3 mixed coxed four	7:37.16	4 R	7:08.77	4 FB	7:31.82	8

Qualification Legend: FA=Final A (medal); FB=Final B (non-medal); R=Repechage

== Shooting ==
Brazil entered two para-shooter's after achieved quota places for the following events by virtue of their best finishes at the 2022, 2023 and 2024 world cup, 2022 World Championships, 2023 World Championships and 2023 Parapan American Games, as long as they obtained a minimum qualifying score (MQS).

Mixed

Athlete	Event	Qualification		Final	
Athlete	Event	Points	Rank	Points	Rank
Alexandre Galgani	R4 – 10 m air rifle standing SH2	627.7	21	Did not advance	
Alexandre Galgani	R5 – 10 m air rifle prone SH2	637.1	4 Q	254.2	2nd place, silver medalist(s)
Alexandre Galgani	R9 – 50 m rifle prone SH2	620.2	11	Did not advance	
Bruno Kiefer	R4 – 10 m air rifle standing SH2	620.6	27	Did not advance	
Bruno Kiefer	R5 – 10 m air rifle prone SH2	622.3	35	Did not advance	

== Sitting volleyball ==
Brazil qualified for both the men's and women's tournaments.

Summary

Team	Event	Group Stage				Semifinal	Final / BM	
Team	Event	Opposition Score	Opposition Score	Opposition Score	Rank	Opposition Score	Opposition Score	Rank
Brazil men's	Men's tournament	Germany; L 0–3	Iran; L 0–3	Ukraine; W 3–1	3	Did not advance	Fifth place match Kazakhstan; L 0–3	6
Brazil women's	Women's tournament	Rwanda; W 3–0	Canada; W 3–1	Slovenia; W 3–0	1 Q	United States; L 1–3	Bronze medal match Canada; L 0–3	4

=== Men's tournament ===
The Brazilian men's sitting volleyball team qualified for the Paralympic games after going undefeated in the 2023 Pan American Sitting Volleyball Championships held in Edmonton, Canada.

Team roster

The roster was announced on 25 June 2024.

Head coach: José Agtonio Guedes

- Alex Witkovski
- Anderson dos Santos
- Daniel Yoshizawa
- Diogo Rebouças
- Levi Gomes
- Luís Fabiano Oliveira
- Marcio Borges
- Raysson Ferreira
- Renato Leite
- Thiago Rocha
- Wellington Platini
- Wescley Oliveira

Group play

Pos	Team	Pld	W	L	Pts	SW	SL	SR	SPW	SPL	SPR	Qualification
1	Iran	3	3	0	3	9	0	MAX	225	132	1.705	Semifinals
2	Germany	3	2	1	2	6	4	1.500	223	213	1.047	Semifinals
3	Brazil	3	1	2	1	3	7	0.429	205	240	0.854	Fifth place match
4	Ukraine	3	0	3	0	2	9	0.222	201	269	0.747	Seventh place match

Source: Paris 2024

30 August 2024; 18:00	Brazil	0–3	Germany	North Paris Arena, Paris; Attendance: 3,752; Referees: Neal Konowalyk (GER), Krisztina Arpas (HUN)
30 August 2024; 18:00	(16–25, 29–31, 19–25); P2 Report			North Paris Arena, Paris; Attendance: 3,752; Referees: Neal Konowalyk (GER), Krisztina Arpas (HUN)

1 September 2024; 12:00	Iran	3–0	Brazil	North Paris Arena, Paris; Attendance: 3,860; Referees: Ayan Rakhmetov (KAZ), Khalid Shanishah (LBA)
1 September 2024; 12:00	(25–12, 25–13, 25–19); P2 Report			North Paris Arena, Paris; Attendance: 3,860; Referees: Ayan Rakhmetov (KAZ), Khalid Shanishah (LBA)

3 September 2024; 18:30	Brazil	3–1	Ukraine	North Paris Arena, Paris; Attendance: 2,377; Referees: Amina Elsergany (EGY), Ayan Rakhmetov (KAZ)
3 September 2024; 18:30	(25–17, 25–22, 22–25, 25–20); P2 Report			North Paris Arena, Paris; Attendance: 2,377; Referees: Amina Elsergany (EGY), Ayan Rakhmetov (KAZ)

Fifth place match

4 September 2024; 20:00	Kazakhstan	3–0	Brazil	North Paris Arena, Paris; Attendance: 1,570; Referees: Spela Plesnik (SLO), Benno Meijer (NED)
4 September 2024; 20:00	(25–19, 25–18, 25–19); P2 Report			North Paris Arena, Paris; Attendance: 1,570; Referees: Spela Plesnik (SLO), Benno Meijer (NED)

=== Women's tournament ===
The Brazilian women's sitting volleyball team qualified for the Paralympic games after winning the 2022 Sitting Volleyball World Championships held in Sarajevo, Serbia.

Team roster

The roster was announced on 25 June 2024.

Head coach: Fernando Guimarães

- Ádria Silva
- Bruna Nascimento
- Camila Leiria
- Edwarda Oliveira
- Gizele Dias
- Janaína Petit
- Laiana Batista
- Luíza Fiorese
- Nathalie Filomena
- Nurya Almeida
- Pâmela Perreira
- Suellen Dellangelica

Group play

Pos	Team	Pld	W	L	Pts	SW	SL	SR	SPW	SPL	SPR	Qualification
1	Brazil	3	3	0	3	9	1	9.000	248	162	1.531	Semifinals
2	Canada	3	2	1	2	7	3	2.333	235	186	1.263	Semifinals
3	Slovenia	3	1	2	1	3	7	0.429	189	230	0.822	Fifth place match
4	Rwanda	3	0	3	0	1	9	0.111	154	248	0.621	Seventh place match

Source: Paris 2024

29 August 2024; 12:00	Brazil	3–0	Rwanda	North Paris Arena, Paris; Attendance: 3,306; Referees: Krisztina Arpas (HUN), Spela Plesnik (SLO)
29 August 2024; 12:00	(25–13, 25–10, 25–7); P2 Report			North Paris Arena, Paris; Attendance: 3,306; Referees: Krisztina Arpas (HUN), Spela Plesnik (SLO)

31 August 2024; 20:00	Canada	1–3	Brazil	North Paris Arena, Paris; Attendance: 3,872; Referees: Mirza Basic (BIH), Slavisa Kuzmenovic (BIH)
31 August 2024; 20:00	(20–25, 21–25, 25–23, 19–25); P2 Report			North Paris Arena, Paris; Attendance: 3,872; Referees: Mirza Basic (BIH), Slavisa Kuzmenovic (BIH)

2 September 2024; 14:20	Brazil	3–0	Slovenia	North Paris Arena, Paris; Attendance: 1,835; Referees: Benno Meijer (NED), Amina Elsergany (EGY)
2 September 2024; 14:20	(25–14, 25–18, 25–15); P2 Report			North Paris Arena, Paris; Attendance: 1,835; Referees: Benno Meijer (NED), Amina Elsergany (EGY)

Semifinals

5 September 2024; 18:00	Brazil	1–3	United States	North Paris Arena, Paris; Attendance: 2,575; Referees: Slavisa Kuzmanovic (BIH), Philippe Dauchel (FRA)
5 September 2024; 18:00	(22–25, 25–22, 14–25, 15–25); P2 Report			North Paris Arena, Paris; Attendance: 2,575; Referees: Slavisa Kuzmanovic (BIH), Philippe Dauchel (FRA)

Bronze medal match

7 September 2024; 15:00	Canada	3–0	Brazil	North Paris Arena, Paris; Attendance: 4,054; Referees: Mirza Basic (BIH), Ayan Rakhmetov (KAZ)
7 September 2024; 15:00	(25–15, 25–18, 25–18); P2 Report			North Paris Arena, Paris; Attendance: 4,054; Referees: Mirza Basic (BIH), Ayan Rakhmetov (KAZ)

== Swimming ==
Brazilian para-swimmers secured eleven quotas at the 2023 World Para Swimming Championships after finishing in the top two places in Paralympic class disciplines. The full roster was announced on 25 June 2024.

Men

Athlete	Event	Heat		Final	
Athlete	Event	Time	Rank	Time	Rank
Gabriel Araújo	50 m freestyle S3	52.94	11	Did not advance	
Samuel da Silva	50 m freestyle S5	33.59	5 Q	32.57	5
Daniel Xavier	50 m freestyle S7	30.05	10	Did not advance	
Gabriel Silva	50 m freestyle S9	27.24	16	Did not advance	
Phelipe Rodrigues	50 m freestyle S10	23.78	3 Q	23.54	2nd place, silver medalist(s)
Wendell Belarmino	50 m freestyle S11	26.76	6 Q	26.11	2nd place, silver medalist(s)
Matheus Rheine	50 m freestyle S11	26.91	7	26.93	8
Talisson Glock	100 m freestyle S6	1:05.76	3 Q	1:05.27	2nd place, silver medalist(s)
Gabriel Melone	100 m freestyle S6	1:11.75	10	Did not advance	
Daniel Xavier	100 m freestyle S6	1:07.16	5 Q	1:07.58	6
Gabriel Silva	100 m freestyle S8	1:00.84	12	Did not advance	
Phelipe Rodrigues	100 m freestyle S10	53.29	3 Q	52.37	4
Gabriel Araújo	200 m freestyle S2	4:11.33	1 Q	3:58.92	1st place, gold medalist(s)
Bruno Becker	200 m freestyle S2	4:31.17	4 Q	4:27.65	5
Gabriel Bandeira	200 m freestyle S14	1:59.65	9	Did not advance	
Talisson Glock	400 m freestyle S6	5:02.41	1 Q	4:49.55	1st place, gold medalist(s)
Andrey Ribeiro	400 m freestyle S9	4:27.96	8 Q	4:27.25	8
José Ronaldo da Silva	50 m backstroke S1	—N/a		1:17.24	4
Gabriel Araújo	50 m backstroke S2	53.67	1 Q	50.93	1st place, gold medalist(s)
Samuel da Silva	50 m backstroke S5	36.47	5 Q	35.16	4
José Ronaldo da Silva	100 m backstroke S1	—N/a		DSQ	
Gabriel Araújo	100 m backstroke S2	1:59.54	1 Q	1:53.67	1st place, gold medalist(s)
Lucas Lamente	100 m backstroke S9	1:07.72	12	Did not advance	
Victor Almeida	100 m backstroke S9	1:04.78	6 Q	1:03.69	5
Wendell Belarmino	100 m backstroke S11	1:14.09	10	Did not advance	
Douglas Matera	100 m backstroke S12	1:04.19	6 Q	1:03.74	6
Gabriel Bandeira	100 m backstroke S14	1:01.30	8 Q	58.54	2nd place, silver medalist(s)
Arthur Xavier	100 m backstroke S14	1:02.60	10	Did not advance	
Bruno Becker	50 m breaststroke SB2	1:51.10	11	Did not advance	
Roberto Alcalde	100 m breaststroke SB5	1:38.96	8 Q	1:38.85	6
Lucas Lamente	100 m breaststroke SB9	1:11.20	=9	Did not advance	
Ruan Lima	100 m breaststroke SB9	1:11.20	=9	Did not advance	
João Pedro Brutos	100 m breaststroke SB14	1:04.70	2 Q	1:04.97	4
Samuel da Silva	50 m butterfly S5	32.91	3 Q	32.33	4
Gabriel Melone	50 m butterfly S6	33.05	6 Q	32.82	5
Gabriel Silva	100 m butterfly S8	DSQ		Did not advance	
Wendell Belarmino	100 m butterfly S11	1:05.98	4 Q	1:04.84	6
Douglas Matera	100 m butterfly S12	59.48	6 Q	59.25	6
Gabriel Bandeira	100 m butterfly S14	56.06	4 Q	55.08	3rd place, bronze medalist(s)
Gabriel Araújo	150 m individual medley SM3	3:15.06	4 Q	3:14.02	4
Talisson Glock	200 m individual medley SM6	2:44.17	3 Q	2:39.30	3rd place, bronze medalist(s)
Lucas Lamente	200 m individual medley SM9	2:25.01	10	Did not advance	
Ruan Lima	200 m individual medley SM10	2:24.23	15	Did not advance	
Gabriel Bandeira	200 m individual medley SM14	2:19.48	11	Did not advance	
João Pedro Brutos	200 m individual medley SM14	2:15.85	9	Did not advance	

Women

Athlete	Event	Heat		Final	
Athlete	Event	Time	Rank	Time	Rank
Patrícia Pereira	50 m freestyle S4	41.70	5 Q	41.75	4
Lídia Vieira da Cruz	50 m freestyle S4	38.61	1 Q	DSQ	
Mayara Petzold	50 m freestyle S6	35.82	7 Q	35.60	5
Cecília Jerônimo	50 m freestyle S8	30.44	1 Q	30.31	2nd place, silver medalist(s)
Vitória Ribeiro	50 m freestyle S8	33.51	11	Did not advance	
Mariana Ribeiro	50 m freestyle S10	28.26	8 Q	27.81	7
Carolina Santiago	50 m freestyle S13	26.71	1 Q	26.75	1st place, gold medalist(s)
Lucilene Sousa	50 m freestyle S13	28.65	12	Did not advance	
Maiara Barreto	100 m freestyle S3	2:24.98	10	Did not advance	
Edênia Garcia	100 m freestyle S3	2:40.86	16	Did not advance	
Esthefany de Oliveira	100 m freestyle S5	1:34.10	12	Did not advance	
Patrícia Pereira	100 m freestyle S5	1:35.14	13	Did not advance	
Mariana Ribeiro	100 m freestyle S9	1:04.62	5 Q	1:02.22	3rd place, bronze medalist(s)
Carolina Santiago	100 m freestyle S12	1:00.50	1 Q	59.30	1st place, gold medalist(s)
Lucilene Sousa	100 m freestyle S12	1:03.14	6 Q	1:02.47	6
Esthefany de Oliveira	200 m freestyle S5	3:20.62	13	Did not advance	
Lídia Vieira da Cruz	200 m freestyle S5	3:12.19	10	Did not advance	
Laila Suzigan	400 m freestyle S6	—N/a		5:33.02	4
Maiara Barreto	50 m backstroke S3	1:07.64	6 Q	1:05.97	6
Edênia Garcia	50 m backstroke S3	1:04.03	5 Q	1:02.83	5
Lídia Vieira da Cruz	50 m backstroke S4	—N/a		52.00	3rd place, bronze medalist(s)
Mayara Petzold	100 m backstroke S6	1:36.40	9	Did not advance	
Mariana Ribeiro	100 m backstroke S9	1:10.80	2 Q	1:09.27	3rd place, bronze medalist(s)
Carolina Santiago	100 m backstroke S12	1:09.60	1 Q	1:08.23	1st place, gold medalist(s)
Raquel Viel	100 m backstroke S12	1:20.51	10	Did not advance	
Ana Karolina Soares	100 m backstroke S14	1:11.18	8 Q	1:10.70	7
Patrícia Pereira	50 m breaststroke SB3	58.82	2 Q	58.31	2nd place, silver medalist(s)
Lídia Vieira da Cruz	50 m breaststroke SB3	1:03.36	5 Q	1:04.10	6
Esthefany de Oliveira	100 m breaststroke SB5	2:06.41	9	Did not advance	
Laila Suzigan	100 m breaststroke SB5	1:53.12	5 Q	1:53.03	6
Carolina Santiago	100 m breaststroke SB12	1:19.49	2 Q	1:15.62	2nd place, silver medalist(s)
Raquel Viel	100 m breaststroke SB12	1:33.10	10	Did not advance	
Beatriz Carneiro	100 m breaststroke SB14	1:16.99	2 Q	1:16.46	3rd place, bronze medalist(s)
Débora Carneiro	100 m breaststroke SB14	1:16.04	1 Q	1:16.02	2nd place, silver medalist(s)
Esthefany de Oliveira	50 m butterfly S5	49.32	7 Q	50.02	8
Mayara Petzold	50 m butterfly S6	38.00	3 Q	37.51	3rd place, bronze medalist(s)
Vitória Ribeiro	100 m butterfly S8	1:16.53	7 Q	1:16.21	8
Carolina Santiago	100 m butterfly S13	1:07.50	10	Did not advance	
Lucilene Sousa	100 m butterfly S13	1:12.03	16	Did not advance	
Ana Karolina Soares	100 m butterfly S14	1:12.29	14	Did not advance	
Patrícia Pereira	150 m individual medley SM4	3:06.70	6 Q	3:05.99	8
Lídia Vieira da Cruz	150 m individual medley SM4	2:58.70	4 Q	2:57.16	3rd place, bronze medalist(s)
Esthefany de Oliveira	200 m individual medley SM5	3:51.90	7 Q	3:52.06	7
Carolina Santiago	200 m individual medley SM13	2:32.84	6 Q	2:30.05	5
Ana Karolina Soares	200 m individual medley SM14	2:42.07	13	Did not advance	

Mixed

Athlete	Event	Heat		Final	
Athlete	Event	Time	Rank	Time	Rank
Talisson Glock; Patrícia Pereira; Lídia Vieira da Cruz; Daniel Xavier; Samuel da Silva^{[a]}	4 × 50 m freestyle relay 20 pts	2:23.12	2 Q	2:20.91	3rd place, bronze medalist(s)
Talisson Glock; Cecília Jerônimo; Mariana Ribeiro; Phelipe Rodrigues	4 × 100 m freestyle relay 34 pts	—N/a		4:06.44	4
Douglas Matera; Matheus Rheine; Carolina Santiago; Lucilene Sousa	4 × 100 m freestyle relay 49 pts	—N/a		3:56.94	2nd place, silver medalist(s)
Gabriel Bandeira; Beatriz Carneiro; Ana Karolina Soares; Arthur Xavier	4 × 100 m freestyle relay S14	—N/a		3:47.49	3rd place, bronze medalist(s)
Roberto Alcalde; Mayara Petzold; Samuel da Silva; Lídia Vieira da Cruz; Gabriel Araújo^{[a]} Vitória Ribeiro^{[a]}	4 × 50 m medley relay 20 pts	2:51.48	8 Q	2:37.91	4
Mariana Ribeiro; Cecília Jerônimo; Ruan Lima; Gabriel Silva	4 × 100 m medley relay 34 pts	DSQ		Did not advance	

^{a} Swimmers who participated in the heats only.

== Table tennis ==
Brazil entered fifteen para table tennis players for the Paralympic games. Six of them qualified for Paris 2024 by virtue of their gold medal results, in their respective class, through the 2023 Parapan American Games in Santiago, Chile. Meanwhile, the other four players qualified through the allocations of ITTF final world ranking.

Men

Athlete	Event	Round of 32	Round of 16	Quarterfinals	Semifinals	Final / BM	
Athlete	Event	Opposition Result	Opposition Result	Opposition Result	Opposition Result	Opposition Result	Rank
Lucas Arabian	Individual C5	—N/a	Akingbemisilu (NGR); W 3–2	Palikuca (SRB); L 0–3	Did not advance		
Paulo Salmin	Individual C7	—N/a	Hansson (SWE); L 1–3	Did not advance			
Israel Stroh	Individual C7	—N/a	Youssef (EGY); L 0–3	Did not advance			
Luiz Manara	Individual C8	Peng (CHN); L 0–3	Did not advance				
Cláudio Massad	Individual C10	—N/a	Gardos (AUT); W 3–1	Chojnowski (POL); L 0–3	Did not advance		
Thiago Simões	Individual C11	—N/a	Abdalla (EGY); W 3–0	Kim (KOR); L 1–3	Did not advance		
Paulo Salmin; Israel Stroh	Doubles MD14	—N/a	Bye	Karabardak / Shilton (GBR); L 1–3	Did not advance		
Luiz Manara; Cláudio Massad	Doubles MD18	Bye	Cardona / Cepas (ESP); W 3–1	Bohéas / Bouvais (FRA); W 3–1	Liu / Zhao (CHN); L 1–3	Did not advance	3rd place, bronze medalist(s)

Women

Athlete	Event	Round of 16	Quarterfinals	Semifinals	Final / BM	
Athlete	Event	Opposition Result	Opposition Result	Opposition Result	Opposition Result	Rank
Carla Maia	Individual C1–2	Bootwansirina (THA); L 0–3	Did not advance			
Cátia Oliveira	Individual C1–2	Bye	Bucław (POL); L 1–3	Did not advance		
Marliane Santos	Individual C3	Asayut (THA); L 2–3	Did not advance			
Joyce de Oliveira	Individual C3	Intanon (THA); W 3–1	Yoon (KOR); L 1–3	Did not advance		
Sophia Kelmer	Individual C8	Litvinenko (NPA); W 3–0	Huang (CHN); L 0–3	Did not advance		
Jennyfer Parinos	Individual C9	Shynkarova (UKR); L 1–3	Did not advance			
Danielle Rauen	Individual C9	Lucic (CRO); W 3–0	Szvitacs (HUN); L 2–3	Did not advance		
Bruna Alexandre	Individual C10	Bye	Händén (SWE); W 3–1	Yang (AUS); L 2–3	Did not advance	3rd place, bronze medalist(s)
Evellyn Pereira	Individual C11	Ng (HKG); W 3–0	Wada (JPN); L 0–3	Did not advance		
Carla Maia; Marliane Santos	Doubles WD5	—N/a	Liu / Xue (CHN); L 0–3	Did not advance		
Cátia Oliveira; Joyce de Oliveira	Doubles WD5	—N/a	Elshamy / Soliman (EGY); W 3–0	Seo / Yoon (KOR); L 0–3	Did not advance	3rd place, bronze medalist(s)
Bruna Alexandre; Danielle Rauen	Doubles WD20	Bye	Lytovchenko / Shynkarova (UKR); W 3–0	Lei / Yang (AUS); L 0–3	Did not advance	3rd place, bronze medalist(s)
Sophia Kelmer; Jennyfer Parinos	Doubles WD20	Hou / Xiong (CHN); L 0–3	Did not advance			

Mixed

Athlete	Event	Round of 32	Round of 16	Quarterfinals	Semifinals	Final / BM	
Athlete	Event	Opposition Result	Opposition Result	Opposition Result	Opposition Result	Opposition Result	Rank
Lucas Arabian; Cátia Oliveira	Doubles XD7	Bye	Feng / Zhou (CHN); L 1–3	Did not advance			
Luiz Manara; Danielle Rauen	Doubles XD17	Bye	Iwabuchi / Tomono (JPN); W 3–1	Grudzień / Pęk (POL); L 2–3	Did not advance		
Paulo Salmin; Bruna Alexandre	Doubles XD17	Bye	Hansson / Händén (SWE); W 3–0	Didukh / Shynkarova (UKR); L 0–3	Did not advance		

== Taekwondo ==
Brazil entered six athletes to compete at the Paralympics competition. Five of them qualified for Paris 2024, by virtue of finishing within the top six in the Paralympic rankings in their respective class. Meanwhile, the other one athlete qualified after winning the gold medal in his class, through the 2024 Pan American Qualification Tournament in Santo Domingo, Dominican Republic.

Men

Athlete	Event	Preliminary	Round of 16	Quarterfinals	Semifinals	Repechage	Final / BM	
Athlete	Event	Opposition Result	Opposition Result	Opposition Result	Opposition Result	Opposition Result	Opposition Result	Rank
Nathan Torquato	−63 kg	—N/a	Bye	Sadeghianpour (IRI); W 22–10	Bozteke (TUR); L 6–10	Bye	Bronze medal final Adouich (MAR); L WDR	5
Claro Lopes	−80 kg	Bye	Spajić (SRB); L 5–20	Did not advance				

Women

Athlete	Event	Preliminary	Round of 16	Quarterfinals	Semifinals	Repechage	Final / BM	
Athlete	Event	Opposition Result	Opposition Result	Opposition Result	Opposition Result	Opposition Result	Opposition Result	Rank
Maria Eduarda Stumpf	−52 kg	—N/a	Bye	Rahimi (IRI); L 4–6	Did not advance	Çavdar (TUR); L 6–8	Did not advance	
Silvana Fernandes	−57 kg	—N/a	Bye	Goverdhan (NEP); W 10–8	Li (CHN); L 13–17	Bye	Bronze medal final Dosmalova (KAZ); W 28–3	3rd place, bronze medalist(s)
Ana Carolina Moura	−65 kg	—N/a	Bye	Gkentzou (GRE); W 11–7	Dassi (CMR); W 21–1	Bye	Diallo (FRA); W 13–7	1st place, gold medalist(s)
Débora Menezes	+65 kg	Bye		Moreno (ESP); W 17–15	Naimova (UZB); L 3–9	Bye	Bronze medal final Akermach (MAR); L 15–24	5

== Wheelchair fencing ==
Brazil has qualified seven wheelchair fencers for the following Paralympics events.

Men

Athlete	Event	Round of 32	Round of 16	Quarterfinal	Semifinal	Repechage 1	Repechage 2	Repechage 3	Repechage 4	Final / BM	
Athlete	Event	Opposition Result	Opposition Result	Opposition Result	Opposition Result	Opposition Result	Opposition Result	Opposition Result	Opposition Result	Opposition Result	Rank
Lenilson Oliveira	Individual épée A	Schoonover (USA); L 7–15	Did not advance								
Jovane Guissone	Individual épée B	Bye	Castro (RPT); W 15–10	Zhang (CHN); L 8–15	Did not advance	Bye	Peter (FRA); W 15–14	Datsko (UKR); W 15–9	Dąbrowski (POL); L 7–15	Did not advance	
Kevin Damasceno	Individual foil A	Al-Ogaili (IRQ); W 15–12	Osváth (HUN); L 2–15	Did not advance		Kano (JPN); L 10–15	Did not advance				
Vanderson Chaves	Individual foil B	—N/a	Serozhenko (UKR); L 9–15	Did not advance		Alderete (ARG); W 15–10	Valet (FRA); L 6–15	Did not advance			
Jovane Guissone	Individual foil B	—N/a	Castro (POL); W 15–2	Feng (CHN); L 3–15	Did not advance	Bye	Naumenko (UKR); L 11–15	Did not advance			
Kevin Damasceno	Individual sabre A	—N/a	Osváth (HUN); L 7–15	Did not advance		Schoonover (USA); W 15–13	Dei Rossi (ITA); L 4–15	Did not advance			
Lenilson Oliveira	Individual sabre A	—N/a	Demchuk (UKR); L 1–15	Did not advance		Rousell (CAN); L 4–15	Did not advance				
Vanderson Chaves	Individual sabre B	—N/a	Dąbrowski (POL); L 2–15	Did not advance		Guissone (BRA); W 15–6	Valet (FRA); L 5–15	Did not advance			
Jovane Guissone	Individual sabre B	—N/a	Paolucci (ITA); L 11–15	Did not advance		Chaves (BRA); L 6–15	Did not advance				
Vanderson Chaves; Jovane Guissone; Lenilson Oliveira	Team épée	—N/a	United States (USA); W 45–24	Iraq (IRQ); L 14–45	Did not advance						
Vanderson Chaves; Kevin Damasceno; Jovane Guissone	Team foil	—N/a	United States (USA); W 45–41	Great Britain (GBR); L 17–45	Did not advance						

Women

Athlete	Event	Round of 32	Round of 16	Quarterfinal	Semifinal	Repechage 1	Repechage 2	Repechage 3	Repechage 4	Final / BM	
Athlete	Event	Opposition Result	Opposition Result	Opposition Result	Opposition Result	Opposition Result	Opposition Result	Opposition Result	Opposition Result	Opposition Result	Rank
Carminha Oliveira	Individual épée A	Taylor (USA); L 5–15	Did not advance								
Rayssa Veras	Individual épée A	Isaacson (USA); W 15–12	Fidrych (POL); L 11–15	Did not advance		Breus (UKR); L 5–15	Did not advance				
Mônica Santos	Individual épée B	—N/a	Cho (KOR); L 1–15	Did not advance		Geddes (USA); L 14–15	Did not advance				
Carminha Oliveira	Individual foil A	Delavoipiere (FRA); L 5–15	Did not advance								
Mônica Santos	Individual foil B	—N/a	Khetsuriani (GEO); L 13–15	Did not advance		Bye	Doloh (UKR); L 8–15	Did not advance			
Carminha Oliveira	Individual sabre A	Nakprasit (THA); W 15–7	Hajmási (HUN); L 2–15	Did not advance		Collis-McCann (GBR); L 0–15	Did not advance				
Rayssa Veras	Individual sabre A	Zou (CHN); L 3–15	Did not advance								
Mônica Santos	Individual sabre B	—N/a	Jana (THA); L 2–15	Did not advance		Lowthian (CAN); W 15–14	Pacek (POL); L 7–15	Did not advance			
Carminha Oliveira; Mônica Santos; Rayssa Veras	Team épée	—N/a	China (CHN); L 23–45	Did not advance							
Carminha Oliveira; Mônica Santos; Rayssa Veras	Team foil	—N/a	France (FRA); L 29–45	Did not advance							

== Wheelchair tennis ==
Brazil qualified three wheelchair tennis players via the ITF world rankings as at 15 July 2024. The full roster was announced on 18 July 2024.

Men

Athlete	Event	Round of 64	Round of 32	Round of 16	Quarterfinals	Semifinals	Final / BM	
Athlete	Event	Opposition Result	Opposition Result	Opposition Result	Opposition Result	Opposition Result	Opposition Result	Rank
Gustavo Carneiro	Men's singles	Sikhosana (RSA); L 4–6, 5–7	Did not advance					
Daniel Rodrigues	Men's singles	Weekes (AUS); W 6–0, 6–1	Ratzlaff (USA); W 6–2, 7–6^{(7–2)}	Oda (JPN); L 0–6, 1–6	Did not advance			
Gustavo Carneiro; Daniel Rodrigues	Men's doubles	—N/a	Parker / Weekes (AUS); W 7–5, 2–6, [10–8]	Arai / Sanada (JPN); W 4–6, 7–5, [10–7]	Cattanéo / Houdet (FRA); L 3–6, 0–6	Did not advance		
Leandro Pena	Quad singles	—N/a		Ramphadi (RSA); W 2–6, 7–5, 6–1	Schröder (NED); L 1–6, 2–6	Did not advance		
Ymanitu Silva	Quad singles	—N/a		Shaw (CAN); L 2–6, 1–6	Did not advance			
Leandro Pena; Ymanitu Silva	Quad doubles	—N/a			Altınel / Kaplan (TUR); W 6–2, 6–1	Lapthorne / Slade (GBR); L 1–6, 5–7	Bronze medal match Ramphadi / Sithole (RSA); L 2–6, 7–5, [8–10]	4

== See also ==
- Brazil at the 2023 Parapan American Games
- Brazil at the 2024 Summer Olympics
- Brazil at the Paralympics
