= Sweden at the 2024 Summer Paralympics =

- Flag of Sweden
- IPC code: SWE
- NPC: Swedish Parasports Federation

in Paris, France August 28, 2024 – September 8, 2024
- Competitors: 20 in 7 sports
- Flag bearer (opening): Louise Etzner Jakobsson
- Flag bearers (closing): Nicolina Pernheim Goodrich and Emil Andersson
- Medals Ranked 72nd: Gold 0 Silver 1 Bronze 2 Total 3

Summer Paralympics appearances (overview)
- 1960; 1964; 1968; 1972; 1976; 1980; 1984; 1988; 1992; 1996; 2000; 2004; 2008; 2012; 2016; 2020; 2024

Sweden competed at the 2024 Summer Paralympics in Paris, France, from 28 August to 8 September.

== Medalists ==
Medal	Name	Sport	Event	Date
Silver	Anna Benson	Shooting	Mixed 50 m air rifle prone SH1	5 September
Bronze	Anna Beck	Cycling	Women's time trial C1–3	4 September
Bronze	Nicolina Pernheim	Judo	Women's 70 kg J1	6 September

=== Medals by sport ===
Medals by sport
Sport	1st place, gold medalist(s)	2nd place, silver medalist(s)	3rd place, bronze medalist(s)	Total
Cycling	0	0	1	1
Judo	0	0	1	1
Shooting	0	1	0	1
Total	0	1	2	3

=== Medals by gender ===
Medals by gender
Gender	1st place, gold medalist(s)	2nd place, silver medalist(s)	3rd place, bronze medalist(s)	Total
Female	0	1	2	3
Male	0	0	0	0
Mixed	0	0	0	0
Total	0	1	2	3

=== Medals by date ===
Medals by date
Date	1st place, gold medalist(s)	2nd place, silver medalist(s)	3rd place, bronze medalist(s)	Total
4 September	0	0	1	1
5 September	0	1	0	1
6 September	0	0	1	1
Total	0	1	2	3

== Competitors ==
The following is the list of number of competitors in the Games.

Sport	Men	Women	Total
Cycling	2	1	3
Equestrian	0	4	4
Judo	0	1	1
Rowing	0	1	1
Shooting	1	1	2
Swimming	1	2	3
Table tennis	4	2	6
Total	8	12	20

== Cycling ==
Sweden entered two para-cyclists (one in each gender) after finished the top eligible nation's at the 2022 UCI Nation's ranking allocation ranking.

=== Road ===
Athlete	Event	Time	Rank
Anna Beck	Women's road race C1–3	1:38:49	4
Anna Beck	Women's road time trial C1–3	21:54.71	3rd place, bronze medalist(s)
Louise Jannering; Pilot: Catrin Nilsson	Women's road race B	2:46:37	6
Louise Jannering; Pilot: Catrin Nilsson	Women's road time trial B	43:19.76	7
Henrik Marvig	Men's road race C1–3	1:50:59	12
Henrik Marvig	Men's time trial C3	45:37.27	9

=== Track ===
Athlete	Event	Qualification		Final	
Athlete	Event	Time	Rank	Opposition Time	Rank
Anna Beck	Women's individual pursuit C1–3	3:59.993	6	Did not advance	

== Equestrian ==
Sweden entered a full squad of four para-equestrians into the Paralympic equestrian competition by finishing the top seven nation's at the 2023 FEI European Dressage Championships in Riesenbeck, Germany.

Individual

Athlete	Horse	Event	Total	
Athlete	Horse	Event	Score	Rank
Renee Claesson-Ribring	Zapp VS	Individual championship test grade III	67.500	8 Q
Renee Claesson-Ribring	Zapp VS	Individual freestyle test grade III	71.307	8
Louise Etzner Jakobsson	Goldstrike B.J.	Individual championship test grade IV	71.055	7 Q
Louise Etzner Jakobsson	Goldstrike B.J.	Individual freestyle test grade IV	73.570	8
Anita Johnsson	Currant LA	Individual championship test grade I	67.792	13
Anita Johnsson	Currant LA	Individual freestyle test grade I	Did not advance	
Lotta Wallin	Questionmark	Individual championship test grade V	69.026	8 Q
Lotta Wallin	Questionmark	Individual freestyle test grade V	70.565	8

Team

Athlete	Horse	Event	Individual score	Total	
Athlete	Horse	Event	TT	Score	Rank
Renee Claesson-Ribring	See above	Team	68.600	204.611	14
Louise Etzner Jakobsson	See above	Team	70.459	204.611	14
Lotta Wallin	See above	Team	65.552	204.611	14

== Judo ==
Athlete	Event	Round of 16	Quarterfinals	Semifinals	Repechage round 1	Repechage round 2	Final/ BM	
Athlete	Event	Opposition Result	Opposition Result	Opposition Result	Opposition Result	Opposition Result	Opposition Result	Rank
Nicolina Pernheim Goodrich	Women's 70 kg J1	—N/a	Lkhaijav (MGL); W 10–00	Liu (CHN); L 00–10	Bye		Uslu (TUR); W 11–00	3rd place, bronze medalist(s)

== Rowing ==
Athlete	Event	Heats		Repechage		Final	
Athlete	Event	Time	Rank	Time	Rank	Time	Rank
Ebba Einarsson	Women's single sculls	11:35.91	5 R	11:33.21	4 FB	11:45.33	9

Qualification Legend: FA=Final A (medal); FB=Final B (non-medal); R=Repechage

== Shooting ==
Sweden entered one para-shooter's after achieved quota places for the following events by virtue of their best finishes at the 2022, 2023 and 2024 world cup, 2022 World Championships, 2023 World Championships, 2023 European Para Championships and 2024 European Championships, as long as they obtained a minimum qualifying score (MQS) by May 31, 2020.

Athlete	Event	Qualification		Final	
Athlete	Event	Points	Rank	Points	Rank
Anna Benson	Women's 10 m air rifle standing SH1	620.5	6 Q	184.7	5
Anna Benson	Women's 50 m air rifle 3 positions SH1	1175-54x	1 Q	432.6	4
Anna Benson	Mixed 50 m air rifle prone SH1	626.3	3 Q	248.8	2nd place, silver medalist(s)
Philip Jönsson	Mixed 10 m air rifle standing SH2	630.4	12	Did not advance	
Philip Jönsson	Mixed 10 m air rifle prone SH2	633.5	19	Did not advance	
Philip Jönsson	Mixed 50 m air rifle prone SH2	619.3	16	Did not advance	

Legend: Q=Qualified; PR=Paralympic record

== Swimming ==
Athlete	Event	Heat		Final	
Athlete	Event	Result	Rank	Result	Rank
Conrad Hildebrand	200 m freestyle S2	5:43.94	11	Did not advance	
Conrad Hildebrand	50 m backstroke S2	1:19.66	9	Did not advance	
Conrad Hildebrand	100 m backstroke S2	2:45.44	9	Did not advance	
Pernilla Lindberg	200 m freestyle S14	2:14.42	7 Q	2:14.31	8
Pernilla Lindberg	100 m breaststroke SB14	1:22.68	10	Did not advance	
Pernilla Lindberg	200 m individual medley SM14	2:34.32	7 Q	2:33.94	7
Nicola St Clair Maitland	400 m freestyle S7	5:57.26	10	Did not advance	
Nicola St Clair Maitland	50 m butterfly S7	41.64	16	Did not advance	

Legend: Q=Qualified; ER=European record; NR=National record

== Table tennis ==
Sweden entered six athletes for the Paralympic games. All of them qualified for the games through the allocations of the final ITTF world ranking.

Athlete	Event	Round of 32	Round of 16	Quarterfinals	Semifinals	Final / BM	
Athlete	Event	Opposition Result	Opposition Result	Opposition Result	Opposition Result	Opposition Result	Rank
Alexander Öhgren	Men's individual C3	Rodriguez (ESP); L 0–3	Did not advance				17
Jonas Hansson	Men's individual C7	—N/a	Salmin (BRA); W 3–1	Montanus (NED); L 1–3	Did not advance		5
Emil Andersson	Men's individual C8	—N/a	Zohil (CRO); W 3–2	Didukh (UKR); L 2–3	Did not advance		5
Daniel Gustafsson	Men's individual C9	—N/a	Zhao (CHN); W 3–0	Devos (BEL); L 0–3	Did not advance		5
Smilla Sand	Women's individual C7	—N/a	Slettum (NOR); W 3–0	Twomey (GBR); L 0–3	Did not advance		5
Anja Händen	Women's individual C10	—N/a	Hou (CHN); W 3–0	Alexandre (BRA); L 1–3	Did not advance		5
Emil Andersson; Daniel Gustafsson	Men's doubles MD18	—N/a	Punpoo/Sillapakong (THA); W 3–1	Chojnowski/Grudzień (POL); L 1–3	Did not advance		5
Anja Händen; Smilla Sand	Women's doubles WD20	—N/a	Demır/Kavas (TUR); L 0–3	Did not advance			9
Jonas Hansson; Anja Händen	Mixed doubles XD17	Hirth/Tapper (AUS); W 3–1	Salmin/Alexandre (BRA); L 0–3	Did not advance			9

== See also ==
- Sweden at the 2024 Summer Olympics
- Sweden at the Paralympics
