= Judo at the 2024 Summer Paralympics =

Judo Judo at the XVII Paralympic Games
- Paralympic Judo
- Venue: Grand Palais Éphémère
- Location: Paris, France
- Dates: 5–7 September 2024
- Competitors: 148 from 43 nations
- Website: Official website

Competition at external databases
- Links: IJF • EJU • JudoInside

Para Judo at the 2024 Summer Paralympics in Paris, France took place between 5 and 7 September. There were eight events each for both men and women according to their weight categories and, for the first time, their disability class. Several weight events had been dropped from Tokyo 2020 to accommodate the class separation, designed to make the event fairer and more inclusive.

== Medal table ==
* Host nation (France)

| Rank | NPC | Gold | Silver | Bronze | Total |
|---|---|---|---|---|---|
| 1 | Brazil | 4 | 2 | 2 | 8 |
| 2 | Ukraine | 3 | 0 | 2 | 5 |
| 3 | China | 2 | 1 | 2 | 5 |
| 4 | Japan | 2 | 1 | 1 | 4 |
| 5 | Kazakhstan | 1 | 1 | 3 | 5 |
| 6 | Uzbekistan | 1 | 1 | 2 | 4 |
| 7 | Turkey | 1 | 0 | 3 | 4 |
| 8 | Algeria | 1 | 0 | 1 | 2 |
| 9 | Romania | 1 | 0 | 0 | 1 |
| 10 | Georgia | 0 | 3 | 1 | 4 |
| 11 | France* | 0 | 2 | 2 | 4 |
| 12 | Great Britain | 0 | 1 | 1 | 2 |
| 12 | Moldova | 0 | 1 | 1 | 2 |
| 12 | United States | 0 | 1 | 1 | 2 |
| 15 | Cuba | 0 | 1 | 0 | 1 |
| 15 | Iran | 0 | 1 | 0 | 1 |
| 17 | Argentina | 0 | 0 | 1 | 1 |
| 17 | Azerbaijan | 0 | 0 | 1 | 1 |
| 17 | Germany | 0 | 0 | 1 | 1 |
| 17 | Greece | 0 | 0 | 1 | 1 |
| 17 | India | 0 | 0 | 1 | 1 |
| 17 | Lithuania | 0 | 0 | 1 | 1 |
| 17 | Portugal | 0 | 0 | 1 | 1 |
| 17 | Spain | 0 | 0 | 1 | 1 |
| 17 | Sweden | 0 | 0 | 1 | 1 |
| 17 | Venezuela | 0 | 0 | 1 | 1 |
| Totals (26 entries) | | 16 | 16 | 32 | 64 |

== Medalists ==
=== Men ===
| Event | Class | Gold | Silver | Bronze |
|---|---|---|---|---|
| 60 kg | J1 | Abdelkader Bouamer; Algeria | Meysam Banitaba; Iran | Marcos Dennis Blanco; Venezuela |
| 60 kg | J1 | Abdelkader Bouamer; Algeria | Meysam Banitaba; Iran | Kapil Parmar; India |
| 73 kg | J1 | Alex Bologa; Romania | Yergali Shamey; Kazakhstan | Lennart Sass; Germany |
| 73 kg | J1 | Alex Bologa; Romania | Yergali Shamey; Kazakhstan | Djibrilo Iafa; Portugal |
| 90 kg | J1 | Arthur Cavalcante da Silva; Brazil | Daniel Powell; Great Britain | Cyril Jonard; France |
| 90 kg | J1 | Arthur Cavalcante da Silva; Brazil | Daniel Powell; Great Britain | Oleg Crețul; Moldova |
| +90 kg | J1 | Wilians Silva de Araújo; Brazil | Ion Basoc; Moldova | Jason Grandry; France |
| +90 kg | J1 | Wilians Silva de Araújo; Brazil | Ion Basoc; Moldova | Ilham Zakiyev; Azerbaijan |
| 60 kg | J2 | Sherzod Namozov; Uzbekistan | Zurab Zurabiani; Georgia | Ishak Ouldkouider; Algeria |
| 60 kg | J2 | Sherzod Namozov; Uzbekistan | Zurab Zurabiani; Georgia | Davyd Khorava; Ukraine |
| 73 kg | J2 | Yujiro Seto; Japan | Giorgi Kaldani; Georgia | Uchkun Kuranbaev; Uzbekistan |
| 73 kg | J2 | Yujiro Seto; Japan | Giorgi Kaldani; Georgia | Osvaldas Bareikis; Lithuania |
| 90 kg | J2 | Oleksandr Nazarenko; Ukraine | Hélios Latchoumanaya; France | Davurkhon Karomatov; Uzbekistan |
| 90 kg | J2 | Oleksandr Nazarenko; Ukraine | Hélios Latchoumanaya; France | Marcelo Casanova; Brazil |
| +90 kg | J2 | İbrahim Bölükbaşı; Turkey | Revaz Chikoidze; Georgia | Zhurkamyrza Shukurbekov; Kazakhstan |
| +90 kg | J2 | İbrahim Bölükbaşı; Turkey | Revaz Chikoidze; Georgia | Chris Skelley; Great Britain |

=== Women ===
| Event | Class | Gold | Silver | Bronze |
|---|---|---|---|---|
| 48 kg | J1 | Nataliya Nikolaychyk; Ukraine | Shizuka Hangai; Japan | Rosicleide Andrade; Brazil |
| 48 kg | J1 | Nataliya Nikolaychyk; Ukraine | Shizuka Hangai; Japan | Ecem Taşın; Turkey |
| 57 kg | J1 | Shi Yijie; China | Maria Liana Mutia; United States | Anzhela Havrysiuk; Ukraine |
| 57 kg | J1 | Shi Yijie; China | Maria Liana Mutia; United States | Paula Gómez; Argentina |
| 70 kg | J1 | Liu Li; China | Brenda Souza; Brazil | Theodora Paschalidou; Greece |
| 70 kg | J1 | Liu Li; China | Brenda Souza; Brazil | Nicolina Pernheim; Sweden |
| +70 kg | J1 | Anastasiia Harnyk; Ukraine | Erika Zoaga; Brazil | Nazan Akın Güneş; Turkey |
| +70 kg | J1 | Anastasiia Harnyk; Ukraine | Erika Zoaga; Brazil | Christella Garcia; United States |
| 48 kg | J2 | Akmaral Nauatbek; Kazakhstan | Sandrine Martinet; France | Li Liqing; China |
| 48 kg | J2 | Akmaral Nauatbek; Kazakhstan | Sandrine Martinet; France | Cahide Eke; Turkey |
| 57 kg | J2 | Junko Hirose; Japan | Kumushkhon Khodjaeva; Uzbekistan | Dayana Fedossova; Kazakhstan |
| 57 kg | J2 | Junko Hirose; Japan | Kumushkhon Khodjaeva; Uzbekistan | Marta Arce Payno; Spain |
| 70 kg | J2 | Alana Maldonado; Brazil | Wang Yue; China | Kazusa Ogawa; Japan |
| 70 kg | J2 | Alana Maldonado; Brazil | Wang Yue; China | Ina Kaldani; Georgia |
| +70 kg | J2 | Rebeca de Souza Silva; Brazil | Sheyla Hernández Estupiñán; Cuba | Wang Hongyu; China |
| +70 kg | J2 | Rebeca de Souza Silva; Brazil | Sheyla Hernández Estupiñán; Cuba | Zarina Raifova; Kazakhstan |

== Qualification ==
World Ranking List starts from 1 September 2022 to 24 June 2024. An NPC can enter an eligible athlete if the athlete has competed in at least one international sanctioned IBSA competition.

| Competitions | Dates | Venue |
|---|---|---|
| 2022 IBSA Judo European Championships | 2–4 September 2022 | (Italy) Cagliari |
| 2022 IBSA Judo World Championships | 8–9 November 2022 | (Azerbaijan) Baku |
| 2022 IBSA Pan American Championships | 10–11 December 2022 | (Canada) Edmonton |
| 2022 Tokyo International Open | 11 December 2022 | (Japan) Tokyo |
| 2023 IBSA Grand Prix | 30–31 January 2023 | (Portugal) Almada |
| 2023 IBSA Grand Prix | 9–18 March 2023 | (Egypt) Alexandria |
| 2023 IBSA Grand Prix | 25–26 September 2023 | (Azerbaijan) Baku |
| 2023 IBSA Grand Prix | 4–5 December 2023 | (Japan) Tokyo |
| 2023 IBSA Judo Asian Championships | 29–30 April 2023 | (Kazakhstan) Nur-Sultan |
| Small Country Judo Challenge | 2–7 July 2023 | (Finland) Lahti |
| 2023 IBSA World Games | 18–27 August 2023 | (United Kingdom) Birmingham |
| 2022 Asian Para Games | 23–25 October 2023 | (China) Hangzhou |
| 2023 Parapan American Games | 19–20 November 2023 | (Chile) Santiago |
| 2024 IBSA Grand Prix | 14–19 February 2024 | (Germany) Heidelberg |
| 2024 IBSA Grand Prix | 1–2 April 2024 | (Turkey) Antalya |
| 2024 IBSA Grand Prix | 18–19 May 2024 | (Georgia (country)) Tbilisi |

=== Qualified quotas ===
| NPC | Men | | | | | | | | Women | | | | | | | | Total |
| NPC | J1 60kg | J1 73kg | J1 90kg | J1 +90kg | J2 60kg | J2 73kg | J2 90kg | J2 +90kg | J1 48kg | J1 57kg | J1 70kg | J1 +70kg | J2 48kg | J2 57kg | J2 70kg | J2 +70kg | Total |
|---|---|---|---|---|---|---|---|---|---|---|---|---|---|---|---|---|---|
| Algeria | | | | | Yes | | | | | | | | | | | | 1 |
| Argentina | | Yes | | | | | | | Yes | Yes | Yes | | | | | | 4 |
| Azerbaijan | | | | Yes | | | | | | | | | | | | Yes | 2 |
| Brazil | Yes | Yes | Yes | Yes | Yes | | Yes | Yes | Yes | Yes | Yes | Yes | | Yes | Yes | Yes | 15 |
| Canada | | | | | | | | | | Yes | | | | | | | 1 |
| China | Yes | | | | | | | Yes | | Yes | Yes | | Yes | Yes | Yes | Yes | 8 |
| Cuba | | | | | | | | | | | | | | | | Yes | 1 |
| France | | | Yes | Yes | | Yes | Yes | | | | | | Yes | | | Yes | 6 |
| Georgia | | | | | Yes | Yes | Yes | Yes | | | | | | | Yes | | 5 |
| Germany | | Yes | | | | | Yes | | Yes | | | | | | | | 3 |
| Great Britain | | | Yes | | | | Yes | Yes | | | | | | | | | 3 |
| Greece | | | | | | | | | | | Yes | | | | | | 1 |
| India | Yes | | | | | | | | | | | | Yes | | | | 2 |
| Indonesia | Yes | | | | | | | Yes | | | | Yes | | | | | 3 |
| Iran | Yes | | Yes | | | | | | | | | | | | | | 2 |
| Italy | | Yes | | | | | | | | | | | | | | Yes | 2 |
| Japan | | | | | | Yes | | | Yes | | | | | Yes | Yes | | 4 |
| Kazakhstan | | Yes | Yes | Yes | | | | Yes | | Yes | | | Yes | Yes | Yes | Yes | 10 |
| Lithuania | | | | | | Yes | | | | | | | | | | | 1 |
| Moldova | | | Yes | Yes | | | | | | | | | | | | | 2 |
| Mongolia | | | | Yes | | | | | | | Yes | | | | | | 2 |
| Portugal | Yes | Yes | | | | | | | | | | | | | | | 2 |
| Romania | | Yes | | | | | | | | | | | | | | | 1 |
| South Korea | | | | | Yes | Yes | Yes | | | | | | | | | | 3 |
| Spain | | | | | Yes | Yes | | | | Yes | | | | Yes | | | 3 |
| Switzerland | | | | | | | | | | | | | Yes | | | | 1 |
| Thailand | | | | | | | | | | | | | | | Yes | | 1 |
| Turkey | | | Yes | Yes | | | | Yes | Yes | | Yes | Yes | Yes | | | | 7 |
| Ukraine | | | | | Yes | Yes | Yes | | Yes | Yes | | Yes | Yes | | | | 7 |
| Uruguay | Yes | | | | | | | | | | | | | | | | 1 |
| United States | | | | | | | | | | Yes | | Yes | | | | | 2 |
| Uzbekistan | | | | | Yes | Yes | Yes | | | Yes | | Yes | | Yes | | | 6 |
| Venezuela | | | | | | | | | | | | Yes | | | | | 1 |
| Total: 33 NPCs | 7 | 7 | 7 | 7 | 7 | 8 | 8 | 8 | 6 | 6 | 6 | 8 | 7 | 6 | 6 | 7 | 111 |

== See also ==
- Judo at the 2024 Summer Olympics
- Judo at the Summer Paralympics
