= Judo at the 2024 Summer Paralympics – Men's +90 kg J1 =

Paralympical event

Judo – Men's +90 kg J1 at the XVII Paralympic Games
- Venue: Champ-de-Mars
- Date: September 2024
- Competitors: 8 from 8 nations

Medalists
1st place, gold medalist(s)		Wilians Silva	Brazil
2nd place, silver medalist(s)		Ion Basoc	Moldova
3rd place, bronze medalist(s)		Ilham Zakiyev	Azerbaijan
3rd place, bronze medalist(s)		Jason Grandry	France

The Men's +90 kg J1 judo competition at the 2024 Summer Paralympics was held in September 2024 at the Champ-de-Mars Arena, Paris.

== Classification ==
For the first time, Paralympic judo was divided into two classifications:

- J1 – An athlete's vision impairment must result in a visual acuity of less than or equal to LogMAR 2.6 in binocular vision.
- J2 – The athlete's visual acuity must be within a range between LogMAR 1.3 and 2.5 with binocular vision, or with a binocular visual field of 60 degrees or less in diameter.

The Men's +90 kg J1 was in the CLASS classification.

== Results ==
=== Bracket ===
Quarterfinals
Wilians Silva (BRA)	10
Yerlan Utepov (KAZ)	0
Onur Tastan (TUR)	0
Ganbat Dashtseren (MGL)	10
Ion Basoc (MDA)	10
Daniel Knegt (NED)	0
Ilham Zakiyev (AZE)	0
Jason Grandry (FRA)	10

Semifinals
Wilians Silva (BRA)	10
Ganbat Dashtseren (MGL)	0
Ion Basoc (MDA)	10
Jason Grandry (FRA)	0

Final
Wilians Silva (BRA)	10
Ion Basoc (MDA)	0

=== Repechage ===
Semi-finals
Yerlan Utepov (KAZ)	0
Onur Tastan (TUR)	10

Bronze Medal Match
Onur Tastan (TUR)	0
Jason Grandry (FRA)	10

Semi-finals
Ilham Zakiyev (AZE)	10
Daniel Knegt (NED)	0

Bronze medal match
Ilham Zakiyev (AZE)	1
Ganbat Dashtseren (MGL)	0
