= Judo at the 2024 Summer Paralympics – Women's 48 kg J1 =

Paralympical event

Judo – Women's 48 kg J1 at the XVII Paralympic Games
- Venue: Champ-de-Mars
- Date: 5 September 2024
- Competitors: 8 from 8 nations

Medalists
1st place, gold medalist(s)		Nataliya Nikolaychyk	Ukraine
2nd place, silver medalist(s)		Shizuka Hangai	Japan
3rd place, bronze medalist(s)		Rosicleide Andrade	Brazil
3rd place, bronze medalist(s)		Ecem Taşın	Turkey

The women's 48 kg J1 judo competition at the 2024 Summer Paralympics was held on 5 September 2024 at the Champ-de-Mars Arena, Paris.

== Classification ==
For the first time, Paralympic judo was divided into two classifications:

- J1 – An athlete's vision impairment must result in a visual acuity of less than or equal to LogMAR 2.6 in binocular vision.
- J2 – The athlete's visual acuity must be within a range between LogMAR 1.3 and 2.5 with binocular vision, or with a binocular visual field of 60 degrees or less in diameter.

The Women's 48 kg J1 was in the J1 classification.

== Results ==
=== Bracket ===
Quarterfinals
Ecem Taşın (TUR)	10
Tabea Mueller (GER)	0
Rocio Ledesma Dure (ARG)	0
Shizuka Hangai (JPN)	1
Nataliya Nikolaychyk (UKR)	10
Emmanouela Masourou (GRE)	0
Rosicleide Andrade (BRA)	10
Suvd-Erdene Togtokhbayar (MGL)	0

Semifinals
Ecem Taşın (TUR)	0
Shizuka Hangai (JPN)	1
Nataliya Nikolaychyk (UKR)	10
Rosicleide Andrade (BRA)	0

Final
Shizuka Hangai (JPN)	0
Nataliya Nikolaychyk (UKR)	11

=== Repechage ===
Repechage
Suvd-Erdene Togtokhbayar (MGL)	0
Emmanouela Masourou (GRE)	10

Bronze medal
Emmanouela Masourou (GRE)	0
Ecem Taşın (TUR)	10

Repechage
Tabea Mueller (GER)	0
Rocio Ledesma Dure (ARG)	11

Bronze medal
Rocio Ledesma Dure (ARG)	0
Rosicleide Andrade (BRA)	10
