= Swimming at the 2024 Summer Paralympics – Men's 200 metre freestyle S2 =

Men's 200 metre freestyle S2 at the XVII Paralympic Games
- Venue: La Défense Arena
- Dates: 2 September 2024
- Competitors: 12 from 9 nations
- Winning time: 3:58.92

Medalists
1st place, gold medalist(s)		Gabriel Araújo	Brazil
2nd place, silver medalist(s)		Vladimir Danilenko	Neutral Paralympic Athletes
3rd place, bronze medalist(s)		Alberto Abarza	Chile

The men's 200 metre freestyle swimming (S2) event at the 2024 Summer Paralympics took place on 2 September 2024, at the La Défense Arena in Paris.

== Records ==
Prior to the competition, the existing world and Paralympic records were as follows.

S1 records

World Record	Kamil Otowski (POL)	4:39.31	Szczecin, Poland	18 November 2023
Paralympic Record	Vacant			

S2 records

World Record	Liu Benying (CHN)	3:41.54	Rio de Janeiro, Brazil	11 September 2016
Paralympic Record	Liu Benying (CHN)	3:41.54	Rio de Janeiro, Brazil	11 September 2016

== Results ==
=== Heats ===
The heats were started at 11:26.

Rank	Heat	Lane	Name	Nationality	Class	Time	Notes
1	2	4	Gabriel Araújo	Brazil	S2	4:11.33	Q
2	1	4	Vladimir Danilenko	Neutral Paralympic Athletes	S2	4:13.58	Q
3	2	5	Alberto Abarza	Chile	S2	4:14.71	Q
4	2	3	Bruno Becker	Brazil	S2	4:31.17	Q
5	1	5	Jacek Czech	Poland	S2	4:37.53	Q
6	2	6	Kamil Otowski	Poland	S1	4:43.27	Q
7	1	6	Rodrigo Santillán	Peru	S2	4:44.25	Q
8	1	3	Roman Bondarenko	Ukraine	S2	4:57.09	Q
9	1	2	Cristopher Tronco Sánchez	Mexico	S2	5:00.24	
10	2	2	Jesús López	Mexico	S2	5:02.82	
11	2	7	Conrad Hildebrand	Sweden	S2	5:43.94	
12	1	7	Mikel Erdozain	Spain	S2	6:32.13	

=== Final ===
The final was held at 19:41.

Rank	Lane	Name	Nationality	Class	Time	Notes
1st place, gold medalist(s)	4	Gabriel Araújo	Brazil	S2	3:58.92	AM
2nd place, silver medalist(s)	6	Vladimir Danilenko	Neutral Paralympic Athletes	S2	4:14.16	
3rd place, bronze medalist(s)	5	Alberto Abarza	Chile	S2	4:22.18	
4	2	Jacek Czech	Poland	S2	4:27.48	
5	3	Bruno Becker	Brazil	S2	4:27.65	
6	8	Rodrigo Santillán	Peru	S2	4:39.26	
7	1	Kamil Otowski	Poland	S1	4:41.79	PR
8	7	Roman Bondarenko	Ukraine	S2	4:56.47	
