= Judo at the 2023 Parapan American Games – Women's 48 kg =

Women's 48 kg at the 2023 Parapan American Games
- Venue: Contact Sports Center
- Dates: November 19
- Competitors: 4 from 3 nations

Medalists
1st place, gold medalist(s)		Rosicleide Silva	Brazil
2nd place, silver medalist(s)		Rocio Ledesma	Argentina
3rd place, bronze medalist(s)		Giulia Dos Santos	Brazil

The women's 48 kg competition of the judo events at the 2023 Parapan American Games was held on November 19 at the Contact Sports Center (Centro de Entrenamiento de los Deportes de Contacto) in Santiago, Chile. A total of 4 athletes from 3 NOC's competed. Due to the competition having only four competitors, only one bronze metal was presented and not the usual two.

== Results ==
The results were as follows:

=== Pool A ===
Athlete	Pld	W	L	Points	Result
Rosicleide Silva (BRA)	3	3	0	30	1st place, gold medalist(s)
Rocio Ledesma (ARG)	3	2	1	20	2nd place, silver medalist(s)
Giulia Dos Santos (BRA)	3	1	2	10	3rd place, bronze medalist(s)
Katherine Yáñez (CHI)	3	0	3	0	Fourth-place

Date	Time	Player 1	Score	Player 2
November 19	10:24	Giulia Dos Santos (Brazil)	00–10	(Brazil) Rosicleide Silva
November 19	10:28	Rocio Ledesma (Argentina)	10–00	(Chile) Katherine Yáñez
November 19	11:20	Giulia Dos Santos (Brazil)	01–10	(Argentina) Rocio Ledesma
November 19	11:24	Rosicleide Silva (Brazil)	10–00	(Chile) Katherine Yáñez
November 19	12:42	Giulia Dos Santos (Brazil)	10–00	(Chile) Katherine Yáñez
November 19	12:46	Rosicleide Silva (Brazil)	10–00	(Argentina) Rocio Ledesma
