= Athletics at the 2024 Summer Paralympics – Men's long jump T13 =

Men's long jump T13 at the XVII Paralympic Games
- Venue: Stade de France, Paris
- Date: 7 September 2024
- Competitors: 10 from 9 nations

Medalists
1st place, gold medalist(s)		Orkhan Aslanov	Azerbaijan
2nd place, silver medalist(s)		Isaac Jean-Paul	United States
3rd place, bronze medalist(s)		Paulo Henrique Andrade dos Reis	Brazil

The Athletics at the 2024 Summer Paralympics – Men's long jump T13 event at the 2024 Summer Paralympics in Paris, took place on 30 August 2024.

== Classification ==
The T13 classification is for visually impaired athletes with a LogMAR between 1 and 1.4 and/or a visual field of view of less than 40 degrees.

== Records ==
Prior to the competition, the existing records were as follows:

World record	Luis Felipe Gutierrez Rivero (CUB)	7.66m	(Mexico) Guadalajara	11 November 2011
Paralympic record	Luis Felipe Gutierrez Rivero (CUB)	7.54m	(United Kingdom) London	1 September 2012

== Results ==
=== Final ===
The final in this classification took place on 7 September 2024:

Rank	Athlete	Nationality	1	2	3	4	5	6	Best	Notes
1st place, gold medalist(s)	Orkhan Aslanov	Azerbaijan	7.18	7.29	x	7.28	7.11	7.22	7.29	SB
2nd place, silver medalist(s)	Isaac Jean-Paul	United States	7.20	x	x	6.94	6.96	6.87	7.20*	SB
3rd place, bronze medalist(s)	Paulo Henrique Andrade dos Reis	Brazil	6.66	6.95	6.59	7.20	6.92	x	7.20	PB
4	Zak Skinner	Great Britain	6.83	x	6.77	x	6.50	x	6.83	PB
5	Ivan Jose Cano Blanco	Spain	6.28	6.76	x	6.64	x	6.35	6.76	
6	Doniyorjon Akhmedov	Uzbekistan	6.42	6.45	6.37	6.62	4.96	6.51	6.62	SB
7	Ryota Fukunaga	Japan	x	6.12	6.29	6.35	6.47	6.55	6.55	SB
8	Winsdom Asisosa Ikhiuwu Smith	Spain	x	5.85	x	5.80	5.61	5.98	5.98	
	Ken Thepthida	Laos	x	x	x	—N/a	—N/a	—N/a	NM	
	Dragsund Vegard Sverd	Norway	x	x	x	—N/a	—N/a	—N/a	NM	

Notes: Isaac Jean-Paul and Paulo Henrique Andrade dos Reis set the same mark, Jean-Paul claimed silver on countback to second mark.
