= Swimming at the 2024 Summer Paralympics – Men's 50 metre backstroke S2 =

Men's 50 metre backstroke S2 at the XVII Paralympic Games
- Venue: La Défense Arena
- Date: 31 August 2024
- Competitors: 10 from 10 nations
- Winning time: 50.93

Medalists
| 1st place, gold medalist(s) | | Gabriel Araújo | Brazil |
| 2nd place, silver medalist(s) | | Vladimir Danilenko | Neutral Paralympic Athletes |
| 3rd place, bronze medalist(s) | | Alberto Abarza | Chile |

The men's 50 metre backstroke swimming (S2) event at the 2024 Summer Paralympics took place on 31 August 2024, at the La Défense Arena in Paris.

== Records ==
Prior to the competition, the existing world and Paralympic records were as follows.

| World Record | Zou Liankang (CHN) | 47.17 | Rio de Janeiro, Brazil | 15 September 2016 |
| Paralympic Record | Zou Liankang (CHN) | 47.17 | Rio de Janeiro, Brazil | 15 September 2016 |

== Results ==
=== Heats ===
The heats were started at 09:59.

| Rank | Heat | Lane | Name | Nationality | Time | Notes |
|---|---|---|---|---|---|---|
| 1 | 2 | 4 | Gabriel Araújo | Brazil | 53.67 | Q |
| 2 | 2 | 5 | Vladimir Danilenko | Neutral Paralympic Athletes | 56.99 | Q |
| 3 | 1 | 5 | Alberto Abarza | Chile | 59.99 | Q |
| 4 | 1 | 4 | Jacek Czech | Poland | 1:02.52 | Q |
| 5 | 1 | 3 | Cristopher Tronco | Mexico | 1:03.00 | Q |
| 6 | 2 | 3 | Roman Bondarenko | Ukraine | 1:06.10 | Q |
| 7 | 2 | 6 | Rodrigo Santillán | Peru | 1:08.08 | Q |
| 8 | 1 | 6 | Jesús López | Mexico | 1:10.51 | Q |
| 9 | 2 | 2 | Conrad Hildebrand | Sweden | 1:19.66 | |
| 10 | 1 | 2 | Mikel Erdozain | Spain | 1:43.15 | |

=== Final ===
The final was held at 18:00.

| Rank | Lane | Name | Nationality | Time | Notes |
|---|---|---|---|---|---|
| 1st place, gold medalist(s) | 4 | Gabriel Araújo | Brazil | 50.93 | AM |
| 2nd place, silver medalist(s) | 5 | Vladimir Danilenko | Neutral Paralympic Athletes | 57.54 | |
| 3rd place, bronze medalist(s) | 3 | Alberto Abarza | Chile | 58.12 | |
| 4 | 6 | Jacek Czech | Poland | 59.36 | |
| 5 | 2 | Cristopher Tronco | Mexico | 1:04.15 | |
| 6 | 7 | Roman Bondarenko | Ukraine | 1:04.94 | |
| 7 | 1 | Rodrigo Santillán | Peru | 1:07.60 | |
| 8 | 8 | Jesús López | Mexico | 1:08.56 | |
