= Swimming at the 2024 Summer Paralympics – Men's 100 metre backstroke S2 =

Men's 100 metre backstroke S2 at the XVII Paralympic Games
- Venue: La Défense Arena
- Date: 29 August 2024
- Competitors: 10 from 9 nations
- Winning time: 1:53.67

Medalists
1st place, gold medalist(s)		Gabriel Araújo	Brazil
2nd place, silver medalist(s)		Vladimir Danilenko	Neutral Paralympic Athletes
3rd place, bronze medalist(s)		Alberto Abarza	Chile

The men's 100 metre backstroke swimming (S2) event at the 2024 Summer Paralympics took place on 29 August 2024, at the La Défense Arena in Paris.

== Records ==
Prior to the competition, the existing world and Paralympic records were as follows.

World Record	Zou Liankang (CHN)	1:45.25	Rio de Janeiro, Brazil	9 September 2016
Paralympic Record	Zou Liankang (CHN)	1:45.25	Rio de Janeiro, Brazil	9 September 2016

== Results ==
=== Heats ===
The heats were started at 09:59.

Rank	Heat	Lane	Name	Nationality	Time	Notes
1	2	4	Gabriel Araújo	Brazil	1:59.54	Q
2	2	5	Alberto Abarza	Chile	2:01.74	Q
3	1	4	Vladimir Danilenko	Neutral Paralympic Athletes	2:02.02	Q
4	1	5	Jacek Czech	Poland	2:08.06	Q
5	1	3	Rodrigo Santillán	Peru	2:16.35	Q
6	2	6	Cristopher Tronco	Mexico	2:18.75	Q
7	2	3	Roman Bondarenko	Ukraine	2:19.17	Q
8	1	6	Jesús López	Mexico	2:22.50	Q
9	2	2	Conrad Hildebrand	Sweden	2:45.44	
10	1	2	Mikel Erdozain	Spain	3:10.73	

=== Final ===
The final was held at 18:00.

Rank	Lane	Name	Nationality	Time	Notes
1st place, gold medalist(s)	4	Gabriel Araújo	Brazil	1:53.67	AM
2nd place, silver medalist(s)	3	Vladimir Danilenko	Neutral Paralympic Athletes	2:01.34	
3rd place, bronze medalist(s)	5	Alberto Abarza	Chile	2:01.97	
4	6	Jacek Czech	Poland	2:11.21	
5	7	Cristopher Tronco	Mexico	2:14.87	
6	2	Rodrigo Santillán	Peru	2:18.61	
7	1	Roman Bondarenko	Ukraine	2:22.63	
8	8	Jesús López	Mexico	2:25.64	
