= Erika Zoaga =

Brazilian Paralympic judoka (born 1988)

Personal information
- Full name: Erika Cheres Zoaga
- Born: 3 June 1988 (age 38) Guia Lopes da Laguna, Brazil

Sport
- Country: Brazil
- Sport: Para judo
- Disability class: J1
- Weight class: +70 kg
Medal record
Women's para judo
Representing Brazil
Paralympic Games
Silver medal – second place	2024 Paris	+70 kg J1

Erika Cheres Zoaga (born 3 June 1988) is a Brazilian Paralympic judoka. She represented Brazil at the 2024 Summer Paralympics.

== Career ==
Zoaga represented Brazil at the 2024 Summer Paralympics and won a silver medal in the +70 kg J1 event.
