= Zhurkamyrza Shukurbekov =

Kazakhstani Paralympic judoka (born 2002)

Personal information
- Nationality: Kazakhstani
- Born: 2 January 2002 (age 24)

Sport
- Country: Kazakhstan
- Sport: Para judo
- Disability class: J2
- Weight class: +90 kg
Medal record
Men's para judo
Representing Kazakhstan
Paralympic Games
Bronze medal – third place	2024 Paris	+90 kg J2

Zhurkamyrza Shukurbekov (born 2 January 2002) is a Kazakhstani Paralympic judoka. He represented Kazakhstan at the 2024 Summer Paralympics.

== Career ==
Shukurbekov represented Kazakhstan at the 2024 Summer Paralympics and won a bronze medal in the +90 kg J2 event.
