= Paulo Henrique Andrade dos Reis =

Brazilian Paralympic athlete (born 1998)

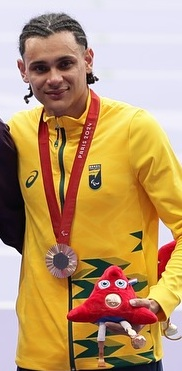
- Paulo Henrique Andrade dos Reis at the 2024 Summer Paralympics

Personal information
- Full name: Paulo Henrique Andrade dos Reis
- Nationality: Brazilian
- Born: 3 July 1998 (age 28) Dourados, Brazil

Sport
- Sport: Para-athletics
- Disability class: T13
- Event: long jump
Medal record
Men's para-athletics
Representing Brazil
Paralympic Games
Bronze medal – third place	2024 Paris	Long jump T13
Parapan American Games
Silver medal – second place	2023 Santiago	Long jump T13

Paulo Henrique Andrade dos Reis (born 3 July 1998) is a Brazilian para-athlete specializing in long jump.

== Career ==
He represented Brazil at the 2024 Summer Paralympics and won a bronze medal in the long jump T13 event.
