= Elizabeth Rodrigues Gomes =

Brazilian Paralympic athlete (born 1965)

Elizabeth Gomes
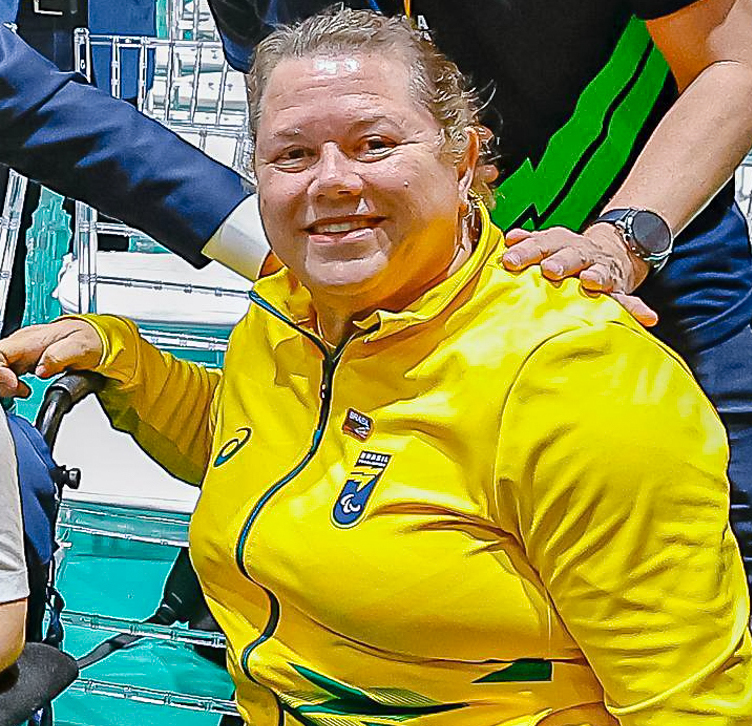
- Rodrigues Gomes in May 2025

Personal information
- Full name: Elizabeth Rodrigues Gomes
- Born: 15 January 1965 (age 61) Santos, Brazil

Sport
- Country: Brazil
- Sport: Wheelchair basketball; Para-athletics
- Disability class: F53
- Events: Discus throw; Javelin throw; Shot put
Medal record
Women's para-athletics
Representing Brazil
Paralympic Games
Gold medal – first place	2020 Tokyo	Discus throw F53
Gold medal – first place	2024 Paris	Discus throw F53
Silver medal – second place	2024 Paris	Shot put F54
World Championships
Gold medal – first place	2023 Paris	Shot put F54
Gold medal – first place	2024 Kobe	Discus throw F53
Silver medal – second place	2024 Kobe	Shot put F54
Silver medal – second place	2025 New Delhi	Shot put F54
Parapan American Games
Bronze medal – third place	2023 Santiago	Javelin throw F54

Elizabeth Rodrigues Gomes (born 15 January 1965) is a Brazilian paralympic athlete, who competes in the F52 class. She won the gold medal in the women's discus throw F53 event at the 2020 Summer Paralympics in Tokyo, Japan.

== Career ==
Rodrigues Gomes competed at the 2008 Summer Paralympic Games as an athlete in wheelchair basketball.

She is coached by Rosi Farias at the club level, and Amaury Wagner Verissimo at the national team level.

She competed in the 2015 Parapan American Games, 2019 Parapan American Games, and 2019 World Para Athletics Championships.

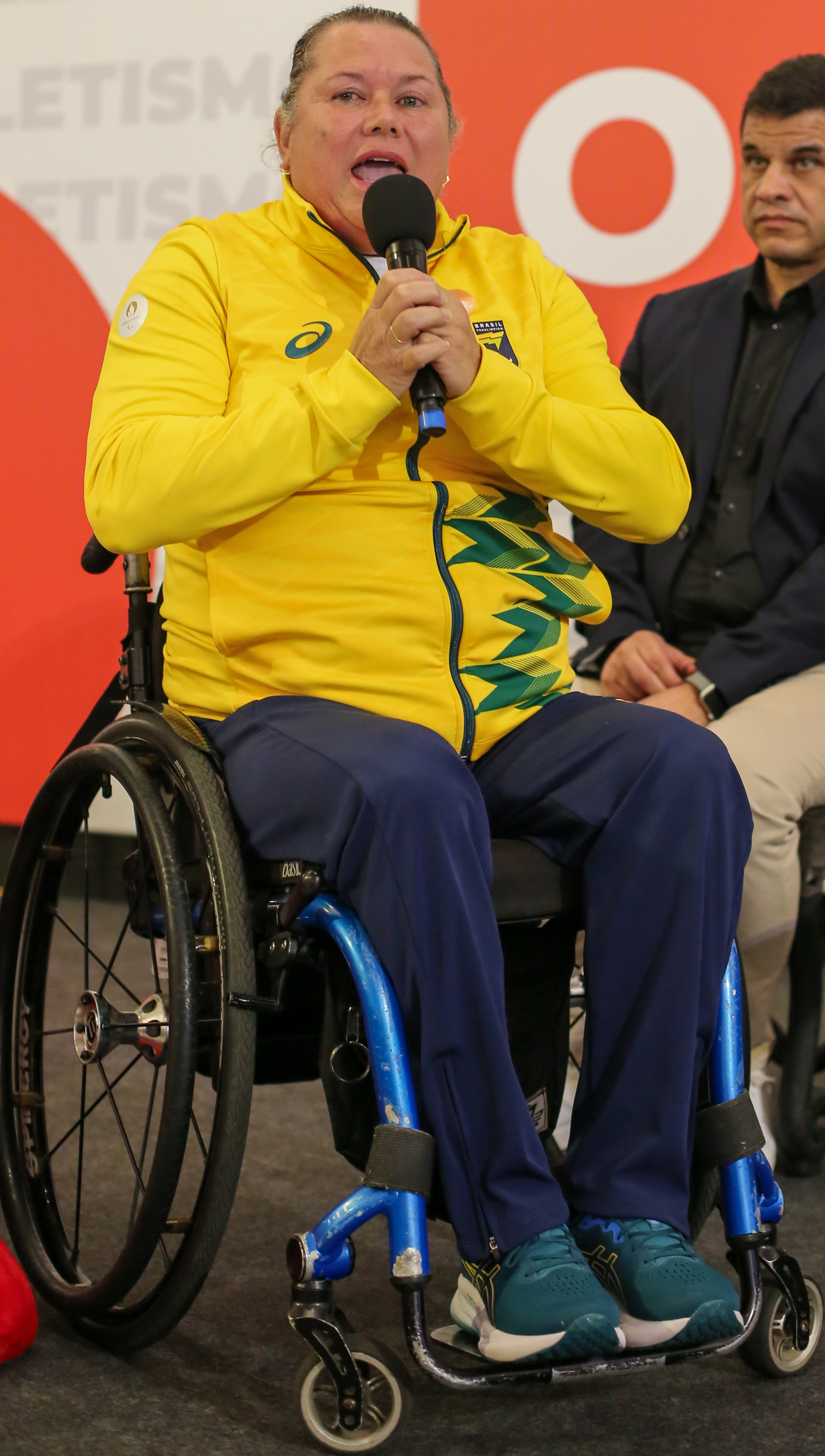
Rodrigues Gomes in 2024
