= Gabriel Araújo (swimmer) =

Brazilian Paralympic swimmer (born 2002)

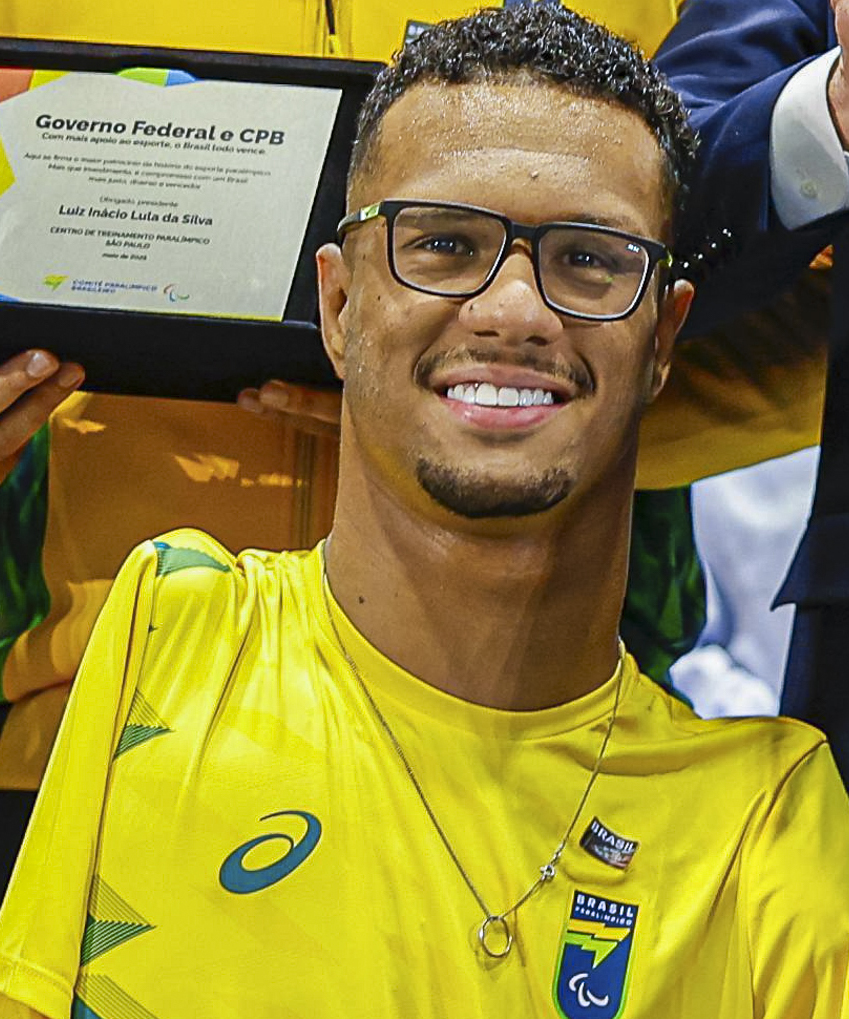
- Araújo in May 2025

Personal information
- Full name: Gabriel Geraldo dos Santos Araújo
- Nickname: Gabrielzinho
- National team: Brazil
- Born: 16 March 2002 (age 24) Santa Luzia, Brazil

Sport
- Disability class: S2
- Event: Freestyle
Medal record
Paralympic swimming
Representing Brazil
Paralympic Games
Gold medal – first place	2020 Tokyo	200 m freestyle S2
Gold medal – first place	2020 Tokyo	50 m backstroke S2
Gold medal – first place	2024 Paris	200 m freestyle S2
Gold medal – first place	2024 Paris	50 m backstroke S2
Gold medal – first place	2024 Paris	100 m backstroke S2
Silver medal – second place	2020 Tokyo	100 m backstroke S2
World Championships
Gold medal – first place	2022 Madeira	200 m freestyle S2
Gold medal – first place	2022 Madeira	50 m backstroke S2
Gold medal – first place	2022 Madeira	100 m backstroke S2
Gold medal – first place	2023 Manchester	200 m freestyle S2
Gold medal – first place	2023 Manchester	50 m backstroke S2
Gold medal – first place	2023 Manchester	100 m backstroke S2
Gold medal – first place	2025 Singapore	100 m backstroke S2
Gold medal – first place	2025 Singapore	200 m freestyle S2
Gold medal – first place	2025 Singapore	50 m backstroke S2
Parapan American Games
Gold medal – first place	2023 Santiago	50 m freestyle S2
Gold medal – first place	2023 Santiago	100 m freestyle S2
Gold medal – first place	2023 Santiago	200 m freestyle S2
Gold medal – first place	2023 Santiago	50 m backstroke S2
Gold medal – first place	2023 Santiago	100 m backstroke S2

Gabriel Geraldo dos Santos Araújo (born 16 March 2002), also known by his nickname Gabrielzinho, is a Brazilian Paralympic swimmer.

== Career ==
Araújo has phocomelia, which resulted in him having atrophied legs and no arms. He swims by undulating like a dolphin, and has earned the nickname "rocketman" for his speed. He began competing at 13 years old, and entered into the 2020 Summer Paralympics at 19, where he won two gold medals and one silver medal. In the 2024 Summer Paralympics he broke the world record for SM2 classification twice in one day and went on to win three gold medals that year.

At the 2024 Para Swimming World Series, Araújo earned 4,229 points, winning the overall men's title. At the 2025 Para Swimming World Series, Araújo won gold in the men's 100m freestyle, the 150m individual medley, the 50m butterfly, and the 50m backstroke events. He also won silver in the men's 200m freestyle and the men's 50m freestyle events.

At the 2025 World Para Swimming Championships in Singapore, Araújo won the gold medal in the men's 100 m backstroke S2 with a championship-record time of 1:54.58, marking his first world-title gold in that event. He also broke his own SM2 world record in the 150 m individual medley SM3 final earlier at the same championships.
