= Nicolina Pernheim Goodrich =

Swedish Paralympic judoka (born 1991)

Personal information
- Born: Nicolina Pernheim; 22 August 1991 (age 34) Gothenburg, Sweden
- Home town: Frölunda, Sweden
- Occupation: Judoka
- Spouse: Ben Goodrich

Sport
- Country: Sweden
- Sport: Para judo
Medal record
Women's Para judo
Representing Sweden
Paralympic Games
Bronze medal – third place	2024 Paris	-70 kg
European Championships
Gold medal – first place	2009 Debrecen	-63 kg
Gold medal – first place	2011 Crawley	-63 kg
Gold medal – first place	2013 Eger	-63 kg
Bronze medal – third place	2017 Walsall	-63 kg
Bronze medal – third place	2019 Genoa	-63 kg

Profile at external databases
- IJF: 65011
- JudoInside.com: 89835

Nicolina Pernheim Goodrich (born 22 August 1991) is a blind Swedish Paralympic judoka who competes in international level events. She is a triple European champion in the women's middleweight category and has participated at the Summer Paralympics three times. She is highly regarded as one of Sweden's best female judoka.

In 2020 she was supported financially by a campaign which raised money from Swedes who bought a particular pillow. The money was shared between Pernheim, cyclist Louise Jannering and long jumper Viktoria Karlsson in order that they could fund guides prior to the postponed 2020 Summer Paralympics in Tokyo.
