= Anastasiia Harnyk =

Ukrainian Paralympic judoka (born 1995)

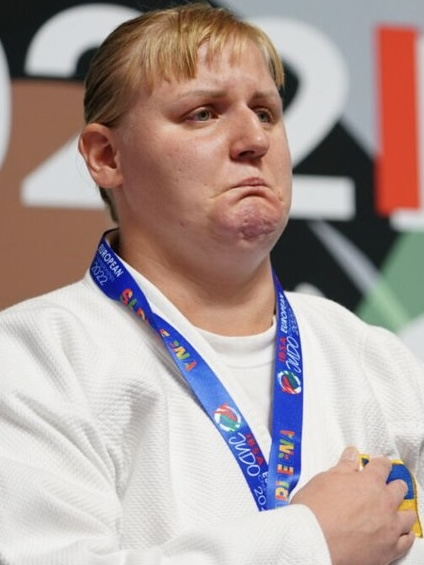
- Harnyk at the 2024 Summer Paralympics

Personal information
- Native name: Анастасі́я Ю́ріївна Га́рник
- Full name: Anastasiia Yurievna Harnyk
- Nationality: Ukrainian
- Born: 10 September 1995 (age 30) Kyiv, Ukraine
- Occupation: Judoka

Sport
- Sport: Para judo
- Disability class: J1
- Weight class: +70 kg
Medal record
Women's para judo
Representing Ukraine
Event	1st	2nd	3rd
Paralympic Games	1	0	0
European Championships	1	0	0
Total	2	0	0
Paralympic Games
Gold medal – first place	2024 Paris	+70 kg J1
European Championships
Gold medal – first place	2023 Rotterdam	+70 kg J1

Profile at external databases
- IJF: 65033
- JudoInside.com: 129774
- Updated on 14 May 2025

Anastasiia Yurievna Harnyk (Ukrainian: Анастасі́я Ю́ріївна Га́рник; born 10 September 1995) is a Ukrainian Paralympic judoka.

== Career ==
Harnyk competed at the 2023 European Para Championships and won a gold medal in the +70 kg J1 event.

Harnyk represented Ukraine at the 2024 Summer Paralympics and won a gold medal in the +70 kg J1 event.
