= Shizuka Hangai =

Japanese Paralympic judoka (born 1988)

Personal information
- Born: 23 July 1988 (age 38) Iwaki, Fukushima, Japan
- Occupation: Judoka

Sport
- Country: Japan
- Sport: Para judo
- Disability class: J1
- Weight class: −48 kg
Medal record
Women's para judo
Representing Japan
Paralympic Games
Silver medal – second place	2024 Paris	−48 kg J1
Asian Para Games
Gold medal – first place	2026 Aichi-Nagoya	–52 kg
Bronze medal – third place	2014 Incheon	–48 kg

Shizuka Hangai (半谷 静香, Hangai Shizuka; born 23 July 1988) is a Japanese Paralympic judoka.

== Career ==
Hangai represented Japan at the 2024 Summer Paralympics and won a silver medal in the −48 kg J1 event.
