= Ion Basoc =

Moldovan judoka (born 1997)

Personal information
- Born: 29 December 1997 (age 28)
- Occupation: Judoka

Sport
- Country: Moldova
- Sport: Judo

Achievements and titles
- Paralympic Games: (silver) (2024)
Medal record
Summer Paralympics
Silver medal – second place	2024 Paris	+90 kg J1
- Updated on 7 September 2024

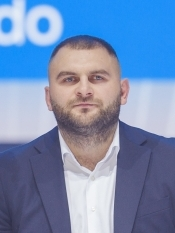
Ion Basoc in December 2024

Ion Basoc (born 29 December 1997) is a Moldovan judoka. He competed at the 2024 Summer Paralympics and won a silver medal in the +90 kg event.
