= Jason Grandry =

French Paralympic judoka (born 1988)

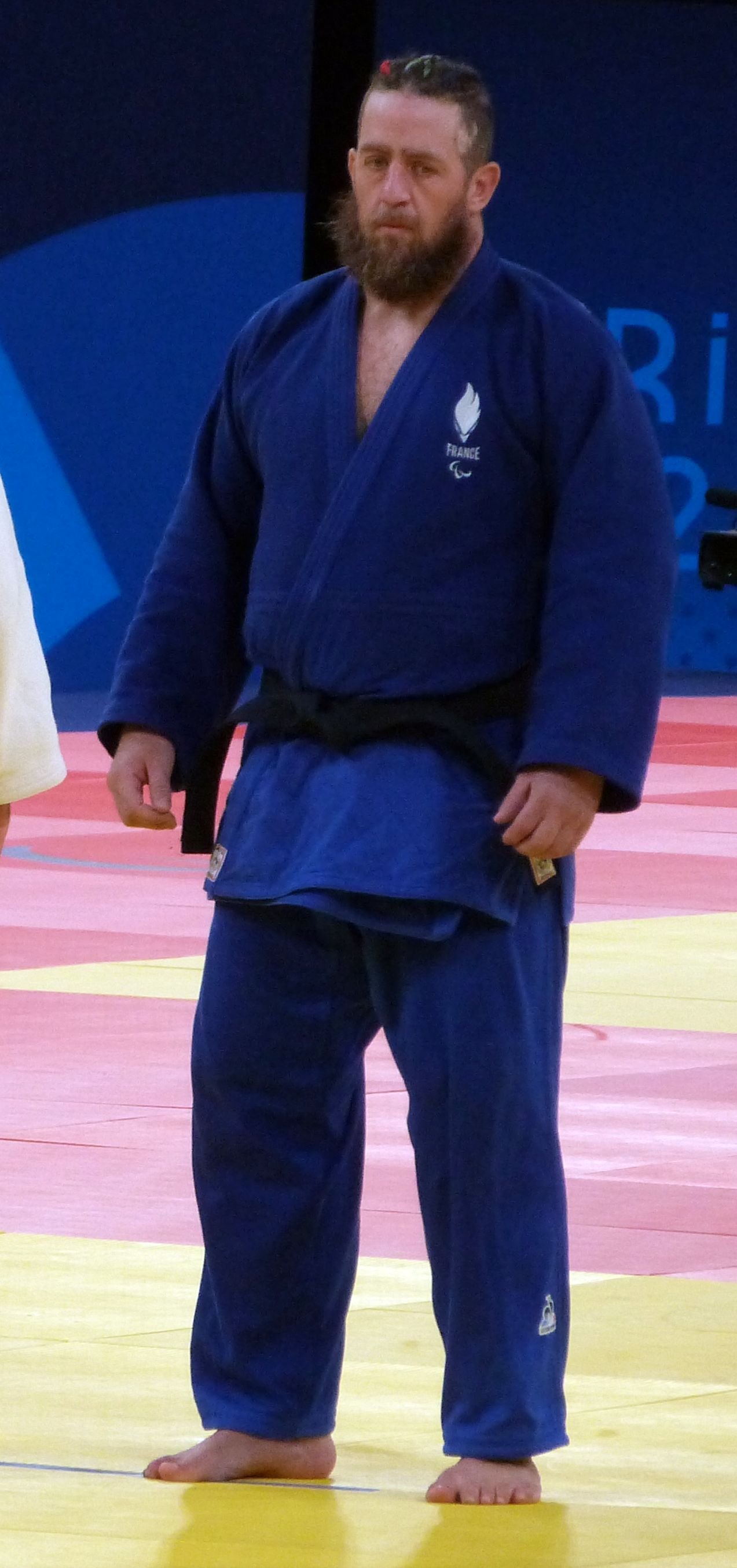

Personal information
- Nationality: French
- Born: 31 August 1988 (age 37) Paris, France

Sport
- Sport: Para judo
- Disability class: J1
- Weight class: +90 kg
Medal record
Men's para judo
Representing France
Paralympic Games
Bronze medal – third place	2024 Paris	+90 kg J1
European Para Championships
Bronze medal – third place	2023 Rotterdam	+90 kg J1

Jason Grandry (born 31 August 1988) is a French Paralympic judoka. He represented France at the 2024 Summer Paralympics.

== Career ==
Grandry represented France at the 2024 Summer Paralympics and won a bronze medal in the +90 kg J1 event.
