= Wilians Silva de Araújo =

Brazilian paralympic judoka

Wilians Araújo
Personal information
- Full name: Wilians Silva de Araújo
- Born: 18 October 1991 (age 34) Riachão do Poço, Brazil
- Occupation: Judoka

Sport
- Country: Brazil
- Sport: Para judo
- Disability class: J1
- Weight class: +90 kg
Medal record
Para judo
Representing Brazil
Paralympic Games
Gold medal – first place	2024 Paris	+90 kg J1
Silver medal – second place	2016 Rio de Janeiro	+100 kg
Parapan American Games
Silver medal – second place	2023 Santiago	+90 kg
Silver medal – second place	2015 Toronto	+100 kg
Silver medal – second place	2011 Guadalajara	+100 kg

Profile at external databases
- IJF: 64971
- JudoInside.com: 89861

Wilians Silva de Araújo (born 18 October 1991) is a Brazilian paralympic judoka. He competed at the 2024 Summer Paralympics, winning the gold medal in the men's +90 kg J1 event.
