= Liu Li (judoka) =

Chinese Paralympic judoka (born 1998)

Personal information
- Nationality: Chinese
- Born: 13 October 1998 (age 27) Changsha, China

Sport
- Sport: Para judo
- Disability class: J1
- Weight class: −70 kg
Medal record
Women's para judo
Representing China
Paralympic Games
Gold medal – first place	2024 Paris	−70 kg J1

Liu Li (born 13 October 1998) is a Chinese Paralympic judoka. She represented China at the 2024 Summer Paralympics.

== Career ==
Liu represented China at the 2024 Summer Paralympics and won a gold medal in the −70 kg J1 event.
