= Merve Uslu =

Turkish para judoka

Personal information
- Nationality: Turkish
- Born: 1994 (age 31–32) Ankara, Turkey

Sport
- Country: Turkey
- Sport: Judo
- Event: -70 kg J1 (formerly-57 kg J1)
Medal record
Representing Turkey
Women's Judo
European Para Championships
| Silver medal – second place | 2023 Rotterdam | -70 kg J1 |
IBSA European Championships
| Bronze medal – third place | 2022 Cagliari | -57 kg J1 |
IBSA World Grand Prix
| Gold medal – first place | 2022 Nur-Sultan | -57 kg J1 |
| Gold medal – first place | 2022 Antalya | -57 kg J1 |

Merve Uslu (born 1994) is a Turkish female visually impaired judoka competing in the −70 kg division.

== Sport career ==
She started athletics at the age of seven with encouragement of her physical education teacher in the primary school. She continued performing athletics until the age of sixteen. Then, she switched over to judo with the recommendation of a coach of the Ankara Metropolitan Mınicipality's EGO SK.

After moving to Körfez, Kocaeli Province, she joined Körfez Bld. Gençler Birliği SK. She is coached by Rabia Nilgün Kerkez.

She weighed 85 kg when she moved from Ankara in 2014. In 2021, she became Turkish champion in the −52 kg event of the national para judo championships after she lost 34 kg weight in nine months under the control of her coach. In Kocaeli, she was named the Special Athlete of the Year in 2021.

In 2021, she was admitted to the Turkey national team. In April 2022, she took the gold medal in the -57 kg at the IBSA World Grand Prix in Antalya, Turkey. In May of that year, she won another Grand Prix gold medal in the same weight class in Nur-Sultan, Kazakhstan. At the 2022 IBSA European Judo Championships in Cagliari, Italy, she became bronze medalist. In Baku, Azerbaijan at the 2022 IBSA World Judo Championships, she placed seventh. After changing her weight class from −57 kg to −70 kg, she won the silver medal at the 2023 European Para Championships in Rotterdam, Netherlands.

== Personal life ==
Merve Uslu was born in Ankara, Turkey in 1994. She was educated in a school for the visually impaired in her hometown Ankara. In 2014, she moved to Körfez district in Kocaeli Province.

Uslu is mother of two children.
