= Rosicleide Andrade =

Brazilian Paralympic judoka (born 1997)

Personal information
- Full name: Rosicleide Silva de Andrade
- Born: 26 September 1997 (age 28) Natal, Rio Grande do Norte, Brazil
- Occupation: Judoka

Sport
- Country: Brazil
- Sport: Para judo
- Disability class: J1
- Weight class: −48 kg
Medal record
Women's para judo
Representing Brazil
Paralympic Games
Bronze medal – third place	2024 Paris	−48 kg J1
Parapan American Games
Gold medal – first place	2023 Santiago	−48 kg

Profile at external databases
- JudoInside.com: 154686

Rosicleide Silva de Andrade (born 26 September 1997) is a Brazilian Paralympic judoka. She represented Brazil at the 2024 Summer Paralympics.

== Career ==
Andrade represented Brazil at the 2023 Parapan American Games and won a gold medal in the −48 kg event.

Andrade represented Brazil at the 2024 Summer Paralympics and won a bronze medal in the −48 kg J1 event.
