= Archery at the 2016 Summer Paralympics – Women's individual compound W1 =

Archery, Women's individual compound W1 at the XV Paralympic Games
- Dates: September 10–17, 2016
- Competitors: 9 from 7 nations

Medalists
1st place, gold medalist(s)		Jessica Stretton	Great Britain
2nd place, silver medalist(s)		Jo Frith	Great Britain
3rd place, bronze medalist(s)		Vicky Jenkins	Great Britain

The Women's individual compound W1 archery discipline at the 2016 Summer Paralympics was contested from September 10 to September 17. Ranking rounds took place on 10 September, while knockout rounds continued on September 17.

In the ranking rounds each archer shot 72 arrows, and was seeded according to score. In the knock-out stages each archer shot three arrows per set against an opponent, with scores aggregated. Matches were won by highest aggregate score. Losing semifinalists competed in a bronze medal match.

In the Women's individual compound W1 discipline, the two lowest ranked archers after the ranking round played each other in a preliminary knockout match, before joining the remaining seven archers in the quarterfinal round.

== Ranking Round ==
The ranking round took place on September 10, 2016. The ranking was headed by Great Britain's Jessica Stretton, setting a new Paralympic record for the event. France's Elisabeth Barleon and Czech Republic's Sarka Musilova were placed in the preliminary round as the lowest two finishers on rankings.

Rank	Archer	Nation	Score	10's	X's	Notes
1	Jessica Stretton	Great Britain	634	14	4	PR *
2	Jo Frith	Great Britain	631	20	9	
3	Kim Ok-geum	South Korea	601	13	6	
4	Lu Liang	China	598	10	3	
5	Vicky Jenkins	Great Britain	582	13	6	
6	Liliana Oliveros Leal	Spain	540	8	5	
7	Lia Coryell	United States	535	7	4	
8	Sarka Musilova	Czech Republic	486	4	1	
9	Elisabeth Barleon	France	483	3	0	

- PR = Paralympic Record.

== Knockout stage ==
Preliminary round
8	Elisabeth Barleon (FRA)	100
9	Sarka Musilova (CZE)	106

Quarter finals
1	Jessica Stretton (GBR)	130
9	Sarka Musilova (CZE)	124
5	Vicky Jenkins (GBR)	130
4	Lu Liang (CHN)	128
3	Kim Ok-guem (KOR)	124
6	Liliana Oliveros Leal (ESP)	113
7	Lia Coryell (USA)	115
2	Jo Frith (GBR)	134

Semi finals
1	Jessica Stretton (GBR)	141
5	Vicky Jenkins (GBR)	131
3	Kim Ok-guem (KOR)	123
2	Jo Frith (GBR)	131

Gold medal match
1	Jessica Stretton (GBR) (gold)	137
2	Jo Frith (GBR) (silver)	124
Bronze medal match
5	Vicky Jenkins (GBR) (bronze)	125
3	Kim Ok-guem (KOR)	124
