= Archery at the 2016 Summer Paralympics – Team compound W1 =

2016 Paralympic Archery event

Mixed team compound W1 at the XV Paralympic Games
- Paralympic Archery
- Venue: Rio de Janeiro
- Dates: 10–17 September
- Competitors: 14 from 7 nations

Medalists
1st place, gold medalist(s)		John Walker; Jo Frith	Great Britain
2nd place, silver medalist(s)		Koo Dong-sub; Kim Ok-geum	South Korea
3rd place, bronze medalist(s)		David Drahoninsky; Sarka Musilova	Czech Republic

The Mixed team compound W1 was one of three team events held in 2016 Paralympics archery in Rio de Janeiro. It contained seven teams of one man and one woman, and took place on 17 September 2016, the ranking round having been held on 10 September.

Following a ranking round, the teams ranked 2nd to 7th entered the knockout rounds at the quarterfinal stages, with the highest seeded team entering in the semi-final round. The losing semifinalists played off for the bronze medal. Knockouts were decided on an aggregate score basis, with each archer shooting 8 arrows apiece.

== Team compound W1 ==
=== Ranking Round ===
Rank	Nation	Archers	Score
1	Great Britain (GBR)	John Walker; Jessica Stretton	1268
2	South Korea (KOR)	Koo Dong-sub; Kim Ok-geum	1232
3	United States (USA)	Jeff Fabry; Lia Coryell	1131
4	Czech Republic (CZE)	David Drahoninsky; Sarka Musilova	1124
5	France (FRA)	Elisabeth Barleon; Olivier Hatem	1086
6	Spain (ESP)	Manuel Sanchez Camus; Liliana Oliveros Leal	1077
7	China (CHN)	Liu Huanan; Lu Liang	1073

=== Competition bracket ===
Quarter-finals
5	France	104
4	Czech Republic	119
3	United States	128
6	Spain	113
7	China	95
2	South Korea	137

Semi-finals
1	Great Britain	144
4	Czech Republic	128
3	United States	125
2	South Korea	137

Medal finals
1	Great Britain	139
2	South Korea	127
Third place
4	Czech Republic	137
3	United States	129
