= Archery at the 2016 Summer Paralympics – Men's individual compound W1 =

2016 Paralympic archery event

Archery, Men's compound W1 at the XV Paralympic Games
- Venue: Sambodroma, Rio de Janeiro
- Dates: 10, 16 September 2016
- Competitors: 15 from 13 nations

Medalists
1st place, gold medalist(s)		John Walker	Great Britain
2nd place, silver medalist(s)		David Drahoninsky	Czech Republic
3rd place, bronze medalist(s)		Peter Kinik	Slovakia

The Men's individual compound W1 archery discipline at the 2016 Summer Paralympics was contested from September 10 to September 16. Ranking rounds took place on 10 September, while knockout rounds continued on September 16.

In the ranking rounds each archer shot 72 arrows, and was seeded according to score. In the knock-out stages each archer shot three arrows per set against an opponent, the scores being aggregated. Losing semifinalists compete in a bronze medal match. As the field contained 15 archers, the highest ranked archer in the ranking round, Turkey's Omer Asik, received a bye into the quarter-final round.

== Ranking Round ==
PR = Paralympic Record.

The ranking round of the men's individual compound W1 event was held on 10 September. Omer Asik of Turkey set a Paralympic ranking round record of 648 from his 72 arrows, earning a bye into the quarter-final round.

Rank	Archer	Nation	Score	Notes
1	Ömer Aşık	Turkey	648	PR
2	David Drahonínský	Czech Republic	638	
3	Peter Kinik	Slovakia	638	
4	Naci Yenier	Turkey	637	
5	John Walker	Great Britain	634	
6	Koo Dong-Sub	South Korea	631	
7	Majid Kakoosh	Iran	628	
8	Uwe Herter	Germany	609	
9	John Cavanagh	Great Britain	608	
10	Olivier Hatem	France	603	
11	Jeff Fabry	United States	596	
12	Jean-Pierre Antonios	Finland	594	
13	Fabio Luca Azzolini	Italy	570	
14	Manuel Sanchez Camus	Spain	537	
15	Liu Huanan	China	475	

== Knockout stage ==
The knockout stages, including medal finals, were scheduled for September 16, 2016. The Knockout matches, as with the other events in the Archery competition, were single elimination barring the semi-finals (where losers play off for bronze), and as with the other individual compound events, the men's compound W1 knockout matches are contested over sets of three arrows for each archer, with the scores being aggregated.

Preliminary round
1	Ömer Aşık (TUR)
bye
9	John Cavanagh (GBR)	124
8	Uwe Herter (GER)	130
5	John Walker (GBR)	131
12	Jean-Pierre Antonios (FIN)	123
13	Fabio Azzolini (ITA)	131
4	Naci Yenier (TUR)	138
3	Peter Kinik (SVK)	120
14	Manuel Sancuz Camus (ESP)	113
11	Jeff Fabry (USA)	126
6	Koo Dong-sub (KOR)	140
7	Majid Kakoosh (IRI)	131
10	Olivier Hatem (FRA)	129
15	Liu Huanan (CHN)	84
2	David Drahoninsky (CZE)	142

Quarter finals
1	Ömer Aşık (TUR)	124
8	Uwe Herter (GER)	130
5	John Walker (GBR)	131
4	Naci Yenier (TUR)	123
3	Peter Kinik (SVK)	127
6	Koo Dong-sub (KOR)	113
7	Majid Kakoosh (IRI)	126
2	David Drahoninsky (CZE)	140

Semi finals
8	Uwe Herter (GER)	131
5	John Walker (GBR)	135
3	Peter Kinik (SVK)	125
2	David Drahoninsky (CZE)	128

Gold medal match
5	John Walker (GBR) - (gold)	141
2	David Drahoninsky (CZE) - (silver)	139
Bronze medal match
8	Uwe Herter (GER)	125
3	Peter Kinik (SVK) - (bronze)	133
