= Archery at the 2016 Summer Paralympics =

Archery at the XV Paralympic Games
- Venue: Sambadrome Marquês de Sapucaí
- Dates: 10–17 September 2016
- Competitors: 140

Archery at the 2016 Summer Paralympics was held between 10 and 17 September 2016 at the Sambadrome Marquês de Sapucaí in the Maracana zone of Rio de Janeiro, and consisted of nine events. Although the same number of events were featured as in the 2012 Paralympic Games in London, their make-up changed substantially, with three men's events, three women's events and three events for mixed gender teams. In each category, two events involved the compound bow - one for wheelchair athletes, the other open - with an open event for recurve bow, the bow used for all Olympic events.

== Classification ==
Paralympic archers are given a classification depending on the type and extent of their disability, allowing them to compete against others with a similar level of function. The categories were reduced from three to two for 2016, with the 'standing' category being replaced with an 'open' category which incorporated wheelchair archers previously classified W2. The W1 classification for wheelchair archers was retained.

The two categories of competition in Paralympic archery in 2016 were:

- Open - Athletes have an impairment in the legs and use a wheelchair or have a balance impairment, and shoot standing or resting on a stool. Six events featured open category athletes, in both recurve or compound disciplines, using bows falling under standard rules.
- W1 - Athletes may have impairment in the legs and make use of a wheelchair. W1 athletes may shoot either a recurve or a compound bow modified from standard rules, across three events. There are no separate competitions for the two disciplines; in practice, competitors will predominantly use a compound bow, as these take less power to wield than the recurve.

A third recognised Paralympic archery classification - V1, for visually impaired archers - did not form part of the competition.

== Qualification ==
=== Individual events ===
A National Paralympic Committee (NPC) could be allocated a maximum of thirteen qualification slots across the nine events, although the NPCs of the 2015 Para Archery World Champions could be allocated additional slots. An NPC could select a maximum of three archers per individual event.

The majority of quota places were awarded for performances in the 2015 World Championships and the continental qualification events (including the 2015 Parapan American Games). A smaller number were allocated to the host nation, to the highest ranked archers at a Final Paralympic Qualifying tournament, and at the discretion of the International Paralympic Committee's Bipartite Commission.

=== Mixed team events ===
There was no direct qualification for the mixed pairs events. An NPC could enter one team (one man, one woman) per event if they had qualified those archers from individual events. Since quota places in individual events were awarded to the top four finishers in the equivalent event at the 2015 World Para Archery Championships in Donau, Germany, a minimum number of teams per event was guaranteed.

== Competition schedule ==
The competition ran from 10 to 17 September. With the exception of 10 September, which was an all-day ranking round for all archers, each day of competition comprised morning and afternoon sessions, with at least one event awarding medals per day.

OC	Opening ceremony	RR	Ranking round	●	Event finals	CC	Closing ceremony

September 2016	7 Wed	8 Thu	9 Fri	10 Sat	11 Sun	12 Mon	13 Tue	14 Wed	15 Thu	16 Fri	17 Sat	18 Sun	Gold medals
Archery	OC			RR	●	●	●	●	●	● ●	● ●	CC	9

Schedule at the Paralympic Games 2016 - Archery
Date	Morning session	Evening session	Date	Morning session	Evening session
10 September	All events		14 September	Men's compound open	
10 September	Ranking rounds		14 September	1/16 eliminations	1/8 eliminations Quarter-finals; Semi-finals; Bronze medal match Gold medal match
11 September	Team recurve open		15 September	Women's recurve open	
11 September	1/8 eliminations	Quarter-finals; Semi-finals; Bronze medal match Gold medal match	15 September	1/16 eliminations	1/8 eliminations Quarter-finals; Semi-finals; Bronze medal match Gold medal match
12 September	Team compound open		16 September	Women's compound open	Men's compound W1
12 September	1/8 eliminations	Quarter-finals; Semi-finals; Bronze medal match Gold medal match	16 September	1/8 eliminations Quarter-finals; Semi-finals; Bronze medal match Gold medal match	1/8 eliminations Quarter-finals; Semi-finals; Bronze medal match Gold medal match
13 September	Men's recurve open		17 September	Women's compound W1	Team compound W1
13 September	1/16 eliminations	1/8 eliminations Quarter-finals; Semi-finals; Bronze medal match Gold medal match	17 September	1/8 eliminations Quarter-finals; Semi-finals; Bronze medal match Gold medal match	Quarter-finals; Semi-finals; Bronze medal match Gold medal match

== Participating nations ==
137 archers from 40 nations competed.

- Australia (1)
- Azerbaijan (1)
- Brazil (8)
- Canada (2)
- China (12)
- Chinese Taipei (2)
- Colombia (1)
- Czech Republic (5)
- Finland (2)
- France (5)
- Georgia (1)
- Germany (4)
- Great Britain (11)
- Greece (1)
- Hong Kong (1)
- Iceland (1)
- India (1)
- Iran (7)
- Iraq (2)
- Italy (9)
- Japan (3)
- Kazakhstan (1)
- Latvia (2)
- Malaysia (2)
- Mongolia (3)
- Norway (1)
- Poland (3)
- Puerto Rico (1)
- Singapore (1)
- Slovakia (2)
- South Africa (1)
- South Korea (10)
- Spain (4)
- Sri Lanka (1)
- Sweden (1)
- Switzerland (2)
- Thailand (3)
- Turkey (8)
- Ukraine (3)
- United States (8)

== Medal summary ==
Great Britain topped the medal table, thanks mainly to their domination of the W1 events, where they won all three golds available and took the only clean sweep of the tournament by winning all three medals in the women's individual W1 event. Outside of the W1 events, China and Iran were the most successful nations, sharing five golds and nine medals between them. Olympic number one nation, South Korea could not match their Olympic success, exiting the Games with three medals, a silver and two bronze.

=== Medal table ===
Rank	Nation	Gold	Silver	Bronze	Total
1	Great Britain (GBR)	3	2	1	6
2	China (CHN)	3	2	0	5
3	Iran (IRI)	2	1	1	4
4	United States (USA)	1	0	0	1
5	South Korea (KOR)	0	1	2	3
6	Czech Republic (CZE)	0	1	1	2
6	Italy (ITA)	0	1	1	2
8	Thailand (THA)	0	1	0	1
9	Australia (AUS)	0	0	1	1
9	Poland (POL)	0	0	1	1
9	Slovakia (SVK)	0	0	1	1
Totals (11 entries)		9	9	9	27

=== Events ===
Event	Class	Gold	Silver	Bronze
Men's individual compound	W1	John Walker; Great Britain	David Drahonínský; Czech Republic	Peter Kinik; Slovakia
Women's individual compound	W1	Jessica Stretton; Great Britain	Jo Frith; Great Britain	Vicky Jenkins; Great Britain
Team compound	W1	Great Britain; John Walker; Jo Frith	South Korea; Koo Dong-sub; Kim Ok-geum	Czech Republic; David Drahonínský; Šárka Musilová
Men's individual compound	Open	Andre Shelby; United States	Alberto Simonelli; Italy	Jonathon Milne; Australia
Men's individual recurve	Open	Gholamreza Rahimi; Iran	Hanreuchai Netsiri; Thailand	Ebrahim Ranjbarkivaj; Iran
Women's individual compound	Open	Zhou Jiamin; China	Lin Yueshan; China	Kim Mi-soon; South Korea
Women's individual recurve	Open	Zahra Nemati; Iran	Wu Chunyan; China	Milena Olszewska; Poland
Team compound	Open	China; Ai Xinliang; Zhou Jiamin	Great Britain; John Stubbs; Jodie Grinham	South Korea; Lee Ouk-soo; Kim Mi-soon
Team recurve	Open	China; Zhao Lixue; Wu Chunyan	Iran; Ebrahim Ranjbarkivaj; Zahra Nemati	Italy; Roberto Airoldi; Elisabetta Mijno

== See also ==
- Archery at the 2016 Summer Olympics
