= Archery at the 2024 Summer Paralympics – Women's individual W1 =

Archery, Women's W1 at the XVII Paralympic Games
- Venue: Les Invalides
- Dates: 29 - 31 August 2024
- Competitors: 11 from 8 nations

Medalists
1st place, gold medalist(s)		Chen Minyi	China
2nd place, silver medalist(s)		Šárka Musilová	Czech Republic
3rd place, bronze medalist(s)		Tereza Brandtlová	Czech Republic

The women's individual W1 archery discipline at the 2024 Summer Paralympics was contested from 29 to 31 August at Les Invalides, Paris.

== Format ==
In the ranking round each archer shoots 72 arrows, and is seeded according to score. In the knock-out stages each archer shoots three arrows per set against an opponent, the scores being aggregated. Losing semifinalists compete in a bronze medal match. As the field contained 11 archers, the five highest ranked archers will proceed directly to the quarter-final round; the remaining six will enter in the Round of 16.

=== Classification ===
Athletes in the W1 category usually have an impairment in the top and bottom halves of their bodies, torso and at least three limbs.

Para archers in the W1 category may use either a recurve or a compound bow with limitations on draw weight, a restriction on magnified sights and other changes to the standard rules. The rules for targets, competition and matchplay for W1 archers are largely the same as for compound archers.

== Records ==
72 Arrow Ranking Round:

World record	Jessica Stretton (GBR)	657	Beijing, China	17 September 2014
Paralympic record	Chen Minyi (CHN)	640	Tokyo, Japan	27 August 2021

Šárka Musilová broke the World and Paralympic record during the event scoring 659.

15 Arrow Knockout Round:

World record	Jo Frith (GBR)	144	Shropshire, United Kingdom	2 June 2016
Paralympic record	Chen Minyi (CHN)	142	Tokyo, Japan	1 September 2021

== Ranking round ==
The ranking round of the Women's individual W1 event was held on 29 August. The top five archers received a bye to the Quarterfinals.

Rank	Archer	Nationality	10	X	Total	Note
1	Šárka Musilová	Czech Republic	27	10	659	WR Q
2	Chen Minyi	China	25	9	650	Q
3	Kim Ok-geum	South Korea	15	4	623	Q
4	Tereza Brandtlová	Czech Republic	15	4	621	Q
5	Daila Dameno	Italy	17	2	609	Q
6	Victoria Kingstone	Great Britain	13	3	608	q
7	Liu Jing	China	11	4	608	q
8	Asia Pellizzari	Italy	14	4	607	q
9	Nil Mısır	Turkey	7	3	572	q
10	Tracy Otto	United States	8	2	547	q
11	Juliana Ferreira da Silva	Brazil	2	0	503	q

WR : World record Q: Qualified direct to quarterfinals q: qualified to 'round of 16'

== Knockout rounds ==
1/8 Elimination Round
9	N Mısır (TUR)	118
8	A Pellizzari (ITA)	112
11	J Ferreira (BRA)	77
6	V Kingstone (GBR)	128
7	Liu J (CHN)	113
10	T Otto (USA)	118

Quarterfinals
1	Š Musilová (CZE)	126
9	N Mısır (TUR)	125
5	D Dameno (ITA)	117
4	T Brandtlová (CZE)	127
3	Kim O-g (KOR)	128
6	V Kingstone (GBR)	122
10	T Otto (USA)	107
2	Chen M (CHN)	124

Semifinals
1	Š Musilová (CZE)	135
4	T Brandtlová (CZE)	131
3	Kim O-g (KOR)	123
2	Chen M (CHN)	132

Gold Medal Match
1	Š Musilová (CZE)	129
2	Chen M (CHN)	136
Bronze Medal Match
4	T Brandtlová (CZE)	127
3	Kim O-g (KOR)	122
