= Czech Republic at the 2024 Summer Paralympics =

- IPC code: CZE
- NPC: Czech Paralympic Committee
- Website: www.paralympic.cz

in Paris, France August 28, 2024 – September 8, 2024
- Competitors: 32 in 8 sports
- Flag bearers: Aleš Kisý; Anna Luxová
- Medals Ranked 53rd: Gold 1 Silver 4 Bronze 3 Total 8

Summer Paralympics appearances (overview)
- 1996; 2000; 2004; 2008; 2012; 2016; 2020; 2024

Other related appearances
- Czechoslovakia (1972–1992)

The Czech Republic competed at the 2024 Summer Paralympics in Paris, France, from 28 August to 8 September.

== Medalists ==
Medal	Name	Sport	Event	Date
Gold	David Kratochvíl	Swimming	Men's 400 metre freestyle S11	30 August
Silver	Šárka Pultar Musilová	Archery	Women's individual W1	31 August
Silver	David Kratochvíl	Swimming	Men's 100 metre backstroke S11	1 September
Silver	David Drahonínský; Šárka Pultar Musilová	Archery	Mixed team W1	2 September
Silver	Jiří Suchánek	Table tennis	Men's individual – Class 2	5 September
Bronze	Tereza Brandtlová	Archery	Women's individual W1	31 August
Bronze	David Kratochvíl	Swimming	Men's 200 metre individual medley SM11	3 September
Bronze	Arnošt Petráček	Swimming	Men's 50 metre backstroke S4	7 September

== Competitors ==
The following is the list of number of competitors in the Games.

Sport	Men	Women	Total
Archery	1	2	3
Athletics	4	4	8
Boccia	1	1	2
Cycling	2	2	4
Equestrian	1	1	2
Swimming	4	3	7
Shooting	2	0	2
Table tennis	3	1	4
Total	18	14	32

== Archery ==
Czech Republic entered three athletes into the paralympics. All of them obtained their quota in W1 event by virtue of their result at the 2023 World Para Archery Championships in Plzeň, Czech Republic.

Athlete	Event	Ranking Round		Round of 32	Round of 16	Quarterfinals	Semifinals	Finals	
Athlete	Event	Score	Seed	Opposition Score	Opposition Score	Opposition Score	Opposition Score	Opposition Score	Rank
David Drahonínský	Men's individual W1	657	3	—N/a	Bye	Tabansky (USA); L 131-139	Did not advance		8
Šárka Pultar Musilová	Women's individual W1	659	1	—N/a	Bye	Mısır (TUR); W 126-125	Brandtlová (CZE); W 135-131	Chen (CHN); L 129-136	2nd place, silver medalist(s)
Tereza Brandtlová	Women's individual W1	621	4	—N/a	Bye	Dameno (ITA); W 127-117	Musilová (CZE); L 131-135	Kim (KOR); W 127-122	3rd place, bronze medalist(s)
David Drahonínský; Šárka Pultar Musilová	Mixed team W1	1316	2	—N/a		Brazil (BRA); W 144-121	Italy (ITA); W 146-138	China (CHN); L 143-147	2nd place, silver medalist(s)

== Athletics ==
Czech track and field athletes achieved quota places for the following events based on their results at the 2023 World Championships, 2024 World Championships, or through high performance allocation, as long as they meet the minimum entry standard (MES).

Key

- Note–Ranks given for track events are within the athlete's heat only
- Q = Qualified for the next round
- q = Qualified for the next round as a fastest loser or, in field events, by position without achieving the qualifying target
- DQ = Disqualified
- PR = Paralympic Record
- AR = Area (or continental) Record
- NR = National Record
- SB = Season's Best
- N/A = Round not applicable for the event
- Bye = Athlete not required to compete in round

Track and road events
Women

Athlete	Event	Heat		Final	
Athlete	Event	Result	Rank	Result	Rank
Tereza Jakschová	Women's 100 metres T47	13.21	14	Did not advance	
Tereza Jakschová	Women's 200 metres T47	27.27	16	Did not advance	

Field events
Men

Athlete	Event	Final	
Athlete	Event	Distance	Position
Aleš Kisý	Men's shot put F53	8.12 SB	6
Michal Enge	Men's club throw F51	28.32	9
František Serbus	Men's club throw F32	33.49	6
Petr Vrátil	Men's javelin throw F38	37.96	7

Women

Athlete	Event	Qualification		Final	
Athlete	Event	Distance	Position	Distance	Position
Eva Berná	Women's shot put F37	—N/a		10.71	5
Anna Luxová	Women's shot put F53	—N/a		8.99 PB	4
Miroslava Obrová	Women's javelin throw F56	16.38	3	15.77	11
Miroslava Obrová	Women's discus throw F57	17.41	5	Did not advance	

== Boccia ==
Czech Republic confirmed two quotas (one in men and one in women), by virtue of their result as the highest rank nation's in the BC3 pairs event, at the 2023 European Para Championships in Rotterdam.

Athlete	Event	Pool matches				Quarterfinals	Semifinals	Final / BM	
Athlete	Event	Opposition Score	Opposition Score	Opposition Score	Rank	Opposition Score	Opposition Score	Opposition Score	Rank
Adam Peška	Men's individual BC3	Romero (ARG); L 0-8	Tse (HKG); W 4–3	Iskrzycki (POL); L 2–4	4	Did not advance			14
Marcela Čermáková	Women's individual BC3	Heckel (FRA); L 1–6	Kla-Han (THA); L 0–9	Owczarz (POL); L 4–6	4	Did not advance			16
Adam Peška; Marcela Čermáková	Mixed pairs BC3	Hong Kong; L 3–7	Argentina; L 3–7	—N/a	3	Did not advance			10

== Cycling ==
Kateřina Antošová, Patrik Jahoda, Jindřich Mašín, Pavlína Vejvodová have all qualified to compete.

=== Road ===
Men

Athlete	Event	Result	Rank
Patrik Jahoda	Men's road race H1–2	DNS	
Patrik Jahoda	Men's time trial H1	37:50.51	4
Jindřich Mašín	Men's road race T1–2	1:24.42	7
Jindřich Mašín	Men's time trial T1–2	25:32.12	9

Women

Athlete	Event	Result	Rank
Kateřina Antošová	Women's road race H1–4	1:06:20	13
Kateřina Antošová	Women's time trial H1–3	31:01.83	7
Pavlína Vejvodová	Women's road race T1–2	1:09.39	5
Pavlína Vejvodová	Women's time trial T1–2	28:53.78	4

== Equestrian ==
Czech Republic entered two para dressage riders into the Paralympic equestrian competition, by virtue of the nations individual final world para dressage rankings.

Individual

Athlete	Horse	Event	Total	
Athlete	Horse	Event	Score	Rank
Vladimír Votřel	Ruby Beatle	Individual championship test grade I	61.542	20
Vladimír Votřel	Ruby Beatle	Individual freestyle test grade I	DNQ	
Anastasja Vištalová	First Love	Individual championship test grade I	67.208	14
Anastasja Vištalová	First Love	Individual freestyle test grade I	DNQ	

== Swimming ==
Czech Republic secured two quotas at the 2023 World Para Swimming Championships after finishing in the top two places in Paralympic class disciplines. Other 5 athletes got their quotas after end qualification period (they have met at least one MQS).

Men

Athlete	Event	Heats		Final	
Athlete	Event	Result	Rank	Result	Rank
David Kratochvíl	Men's 400 metre freestyle S11	—N/a		4:26.24 ER	1st place, gold medalist(s)
David Kratochvíl	Men's 50 metre freestyle S11	26.04	1 Q	26.43	5
David Kratochvíl	Men's 100 metre backstroke S11	1:07.90	1 Q	1:06.54	2nd place, silver medalist(s)
David Kratochvíl	Men's 200 metre individual medley SM11	—N/a		2:24.60	3rd place, bronze medalist(s)
David Kratochvíl	Men's 100 metre breaststroke SB11	1:18.71	6 Q	1:16.45	5
David Kratochvíl	Men's 100 metre butterfly S11	1:05.95	3 Q	1:03.90	4
Arnošt Petráček	Men's 50 metre backstroke S4	43.81	4 Q	43.96	3rd place, bronze medalist(s)
Tadeáš Strašík	Men's 100 metre breaststroke SB9	1:13.33	14	Did not advance	
Tadeáš Strašík	Men's 100 metre butterfly S10	1:02.32	13	Did not advance	
Tadeáš Strašík	Men's 200 metre individual medley SM10	2:22.72	13	Did not advance	
Jonáš Kešnar	Men's 200 metre individual medley SM9	2:23.72	9	Did not advance	
Jonáš Kešnar	Men's 100 metre butterfly S9	1:04.48	13	Did not advance	

Women

Athlete	Event	Heats		Final	
Athlete	Event	Result	Rank	Result	Rank
Vendula Dušková	Women's 200 metre individual medley SM8	3:02.35	11	Did not advance	
Vendula Dušková	Women's 400 metre freestyle S8	5:15.65	8	5:16.48	8
Vendula Dušková	Women's 100 metre breaststroke SB7	1:45.80	8 Q	1:42.90	8
Agáta Koupilová	Women's 200 metre freestyle S5	3:06.38	6 Q	2:59.89	5
Agáta Koupilová	Women's 100 metre freestyle S5	1:27.43	8 Q	1:28.30	7
Agáta Koupilová	Women's 50 metre backstroke S5	54.24	16	Did not advance	
Alexandra Borská	Women's 100 metre backstroke S8	1:22.72	7 Q	1:23.33	7
Alexandra Borská	Women's 400 metre freestyle S8	5:41.41	14	Did not advance	

Mixed

Athlete	Event	Heats		Final	
Athlete	Event	Result	Rank	Result	Rank
Alexandra Borská; Tadeáš Strašík; Jonáš Kešnar; Vendula Dušková	Mixed 4 x 100 metre individual medley relay	DSQ		Did not advance	

== Shooting ==
Czech Republic entered two shooters into the Paralympic competition. Jakub Kosek secured a quota for himself after finished 4th at the 2024 European Championship, in P3 Mixed 25 metre pistol SH1. Tomáš Pešek receive wild card for 3 events.

Athlete	Event	Qualification		Final	
Athlete	Event	Score	Rank	Score	Rank
Jakub Kosek	P1 Men's 10 metre air pistol SH1	550	21	Did not advance	
Jakub Kosek	P3 Mixed 25 metre pistol SH1	567	12	Did not advance	
Tomáš Pešek	P1 Men's 10 metre air pistol SH1	553	19	Did not advance	
Tomáš Pešek	P3 Mixed 25 metre pistol SH1	558	18	Did not advance	
Tomáš Pešek	Mixed 50 metre pistol SH1	507	25	Did not advance	

== Table tennis ==
Czech Republic entered four athletes for the Paralympic games. All of them qualified through the allocations of the final ITTF world ranking.

Singles

Athlete	Event	Round of 32	Round of 16	Quarterfinals	Semifinals	Final / BM	
Athlete	Event	Opposition Result	Opposition Result	Opposition Result	Opposition Result	Opposition Result	Rank
Jiří Suchánek	Men's individual C2	bye	Jakimczuk (POL); W 3-0	Lovaš (SVK); W 3-0	Lamirault (FRA); W 3-1	Czuper (POL); L 1-3	2nd place, silver medalist(s)
Petr Svatoš	Men's individual C3	Quijada (VEN); L 0-3	Did not advance				17
Filip Nacházel	Men's individual C4	bye	Trávníček (SVK); L 0-3	Did not advance			9
Denisa Macurova	Women's individual C11	bye	Prokofeva (NPA); L 1-3	Did not advance			9

Doubles

Athlete	Event	Round of 16	Quarterfinals	Semifinals	Final / BM	
Athlete	Event	Opposition Result	Opposition Result	Opposition Result	Opposition Result	Rank
Filip Nacházel; Petr Svatoš	Men's doubles MD8	Germany (GER); L 0-3	Did not advance			9

== See also ==
- Czech Republic at the 2024 Summer Olympics
- Czech Republic at the Paralympics
