= Uwe Herter =

German Paralympic archer (born 1961)

Personal information
- Nationality: German
- Born: 19 July 1961 (age 63); Balingen, Germany

Sport
- Country: Germany
- Sport: Para archery
- Event(s): Compound; Recurve
- Coached by: Mathias Nagel

Uwe Herter (born 19 July 1961) is a German Paralympic archer.

He has competed once at the Summer Paralympics, three times at the World Para Archery Championships and twice at the Para Continental Championships. In the 2016 Summer Paralympics he finished fourth in the men's W1 compound, being beaten to a bronze medal by Peter Kinik.
