= Liliana Oliveros =

Spanish Paralympic archer

Personal information
- Nickname: Lili
- Born: Liliana Oliveros Leal; 27 March 1977 (age 49) Asturias, Spain
- Home town: Gijón, Spain

Sport
- Country: Spain
- Sport: Para archery
- Club: Colmenar Viejo
- Coached by: Elias Cuesta
Medal record
Para archery
Representing Spain
European Championships
Bronze medal – third place	2016 Jeans de Monts	Mixed team W1 open

Liliana Oliveros Leal (born 27 March 1977) is a Spanish Paralympic archer who competes in international events. She participated in the 2016 Summer Paralympics and reached the quarterfinals in the women's individual W1 and mixed team W1 events with Manuel Sanchez Camus.
