= Jo Frith =

British Paralympic archer

Jo Frith MBE
Personal information
- Nationality: British
- Born: 16 June 1961 (age 65)

Sport
- Country: United Kingdom
- Sport: Archery
- Event: Compound archery
Medal record
Women's Archery
Representing Great Britain
Paralympic Games
| Gold medal – first place | 2016 Rio | Team W1 |
| Silver medal – second place | 2016 Rio | Individual W1 |
World Para-archery Championships
| Gold medal – first place | 2015 Donaueschingen | Team W1 |
| Silver medal – second place | 2015 Donaueschingen | Individual W1 |
- Updated on 12 September 2016

Joanna Frith (born 16 June 1961) is a British archer who represented Great Britain at the 2016 Summer Paralympics.

== Career ==
=== Swimming ===
Frith was diagnosed with multiple sclerosis in 1992, taking up swimming in 1995 as part of her rehabilitation programme. She has competed in competitive swimming, winning medals at the World Masters Games in Edmonton Canada in 2005 and in Sydney, Australia, in 2009.

=== Archery ===
Frith switched to archery after watching the sport in her role as a volunteer at the 2012 Summer Paralympics held in London, becoming a member of Great Britain's archery team in 2014. Frith's first success came in the 2014 European Championships winning Gold in the Individual event. Jo won two medals at the 2015 World Para-archery Championships in Donaueschingen, Germany, earning gold in the team event alongside John Walker, and a silver in the women's individual W1 event. The following year at the European Para-Archery Championships in France Frith won gold in both the W1 individual and the team event, again partnered with John Walker.

==== 2016 Summer Paralympics ====
Frith entered the 2016 Summer Paralympics with a W1 world ranking of 2. In the individual W1 event, she scored 631 in the 72-arrow ranking round, earning her the 2nd seed, behind compatriot Jessica Stretton. She went on to win the silver medal behind Stretton, with fellow Brit Vicky Jenkins taking bronze.

At the same Games, Frith won gold in the team compound W1 event alongside John Walker.

Frith was appointed Member of the Order of the British Empire (MBE) in the 2017 New Year Honours for services to archery.
