= Attitude Pictures Ltd =

Attitude Pictures Ltd is a New Zealand television production company who create a broad range of factual television series and have specialised in popular programming relating to disability.The series Down For Love (screening globally on Netflix) won Best Original Reality Series at the NZ Screen Awards 2023 & 2024 2025 Winners: Grit & Glory - Sports Programme of the Year NZ Screen Awards.

== Activities ==
=== Attitude (TV series) ===
Attitude Pictures Ltd
- Also known as: Attitude
- Created by: Robyn Scott-Vincent
- Country of origin: New Zealand
- Original language: English
- No. of episodes: 720

Production
- Executive producer: Robyn Scott-Vincent
- Camera setup: Various
- Running time: 23 minutes

Original release
- Network: TVNZ1
- Release: 2005 – present

The company produces unscripted television programmes that have screened in more than 86 countries. Prime time series Four Go Flatting, and Down For Love were conceived by Robyn Scott- Vincent. Both series premiered on TVNZ and Down For Love is available globally on Netflix. Soon to deliver a fourth series to TVNZ, Down for Love has been awarded the title of Best Original Factual Series at the New Zealand TV Awards in 2023 and 2024.Attitude's flagship television programme titled Attitude screened weekly on TVNZ 1 for 21 years from March 2005. The television series, distributed by TVF, is character driven and focuses on the challenges but also the resilience of people who live with disability and chronic health conditions, or are raising a child with a disability. More than 700 programmes have been produced. The company also produces children's content, documentary and sports programmes.

=== Paralympic content ===
Attitude has spent two decades filming New Zealand and international Paralympic athletes, and following New Zealand teams to international events. It was TVNZ's broadcast partner for the Paris 2024 Paralympic Games. Grit and Glory (2024) (a 90-minute special) documented the journey of athletes to the Games. In 2013 Attitude Pictures became the first production company to secure territory broadcast rights to a Paralympic event. Attitude secured the rights to the Sochi 2014 Paralympic Winter Games and live-streamed more than 50 hours of coverage via attitudelive.com.

Attitude also broadcast coverage of the Glasgow 2015 IPC Swimming World Championships, and partnered with TVNZ to produce the Rio 2016 Paralympic Games and the 2020 Tokyo Paralympic Games. In 2025 company founder Robyn Scott-Vincent was presented with the Paralympic Order of Merit by the International Paralympic Committee for her services to the Paralympic movement.

=== Special Olympics ===
In 2010, Attitude Pictures was selected by Special Olympics in Washington DC to be the official documentary production company for the Special Olympics Unity Cup. Attitude made documentary content before, during and after the Unity Cup match at the FIFA World Cup in South Africa. Attitude Pictures has partner Special Olympics to support leadership training and has produced several documentaries showcasing the lives of athletes both in a sporting and social context.

=== AttitudeLive ===
In September 2013, Attitude launched an online digital platform, attitudelive.com. The site ensured the company's catalogue of 700 documentaries could be accessed globally by individuals, families, medical personnel and associated support workers as a valuable resource of information and insights. The catalogue now resides on YouTube.

== The Attitude Trust ==
Established in 2008 by Robyn Scott-Vincent and former New Zealand Paralympian Curtis Palmer, The Attitude Trust was a registered Charitable Trust created to promote public awareness and recognise the achievements of people who live with disability. Until 2021, using a creative concept created by Attitude Pictures, the Trust presented national awards at a celebratory black tie dinner, held to coincide with The International Day of Disabled Persons.

The Attitude Awards were televised by Attitude Pictures Ltd, and screened on TVNZ. The inaugural award ceremony was in 2008. They Awards were last held in 2021. The various awards categories acknowledged the contributions and achievements of New Zealanders who live with disability. Proceeds from the event funded tertiary scholarships for people with a disability supporting them to study media and digital media. Funds raised during Scott-Vincent's term have been vested in a new entity run largely by people living with disabilities.

== History ==
Founded in 1992, and then known as RSVP Productions, Attitude Pictures Ltd is based in Auckland, New Zealand.
