= Naci Yenier =

Turkish Paralympic archer (born 1965)

Personal information
- Nationality: Turkish
- Born: 10 February 1965 (age 60) Ceyhan, Adana, Turkey

Sport
- Country: Turkey
- Sport: Paralympic archery
- Event: Compound bow W1
- Club: Okçular vakfı spor kulübü
- Coached by: Hasan Cenk Öz

Achievements and titles
- Paralympic finals: 2016

Naci Yenier (born 10 February 1965) is a Turkish Paralympian archer competing in the Men's compound bow W1 event.

== Early life ==
Naci Yenier was born on 10 February 1965. He lives in Istanbul, Turkey.

== Sporting career ==
Yenier began his archery career in 2012, and debuted internationally in 2015. He has been coached by Hasan Cenk Öz since 2014.

He obtained a quota for the 2016 Summer Paralympics,5. Games in Rio de Janeiro, Brazil.

He was the world champion breaking the world record twice in 2017 and 2019 with his team.

He was in the 3rd place in European Championship in 2018.Beside They were in the 1st place as W1 team .

Yenier is right-handed and shoots 64.8 cm (25.5 in)-long arrows, with a bow draw weight of 19.7 kg (43 lb).
