= Ömer Aşık (archer) =

Turkish para-archer (born 1991)

Personal information
- Nationality: Turkish
- Born: 7 August 1991 (age 34) Turkey

Sport
- Country: Turkey
- Sport: Paralympic archery
- Event: Compound bow W1
- Club: Bolu Polissporgücü
- Coached by: Ahmet Soner Mersinli

Achievements and titles
- Paralympic finals: 2016
Medal record
Men's archery Compound bow W1
Representing Turkey
European Para-Archery Championships
Silver medal – second place	2016 Saint-Jean-de-Monts	Compound W1

Ömer Aşık (born 7 August 1991) is a Turkish Paralympian archer competing in the Men's compound bow W1 event.

== Early life ==
Ömer Aşık was born on 7 August 1991. He lives in Bolu, Turkey.

== Sporting career ==
Aşık began his archery career in 2013, and debuted internationally in 2015. He has been coached by Ahmet Soner Mersinli at Bolu Polissporgücü Club since 2012.

He obtained a quota for the 2016 Summer Paralympics Games in Rio de Janeiro, Brazil.

Aşık is right-handed and shoots 69.8 cm (27.5 in)-long arrows, with a bow draw weight of 18.5 kg (41 lb).
