= John Walker (archer) =

British Paralympic archer (born 1974)

John Walker MBE
Personal information
- Born: 5 September 1974 (age 51)
Medal record
Men's archery
Representing Great Britain
Paralympic Games
Gold medal – first place	2016 Rio de Janeiro	Men's W1 individual compound
Gold medal – first place	2016 Rio de Janeiro	Mixed team compound W1

John Stewart Walker (born 5 September 1974) is a disabled British archer. He won the 2 gold medals in the men's W1 individual compound and the mixed team compound W1 at the 2016 Summer Paralympics in Rio de Janeiro. He was appointed Member of the Order of the British Empire (MBE) in the 2017 New Year Honours for services to archery.

Following a motorcycle accident in 2011, Walker sustained spinal cord injuries that left him with a partially paralysed right arm and multiple injuries. As a result, Walker uses a wheelchair.

Walker retired from shooting in 2019, but continues competing in archery.
