= Miroslava Obrová =

Personal information
- Born: 10 August 1975 (age 51) Vsetín, Czechoslovakia

Sport
- Sport: Paralympic athletics
- Events: Discus throw Shot put
Medal record
Representing Czech Republic
European Championships
Gold medal – first place	2021 Bydgoszcz	Shot put F57
Silver medal – second place	2021 Bydgoszcz	Javelin throw F56
Bronze medal – third place	2016 Grosseto	Shot put F57

Miroslava Obrová (born 10 August 1975) is a Czech Paralympic athlete who competes in international track and field competitions. She is a European champion in shot put and has competed at the 2024 Summer Paralympics.

In 2009, Obrová lost both her legs when she was hit by an oncoming train at an unprotected level crossing. She made it to the Games by virtue of a wild card granted to her at the last minute by the sports association.
