= Peter Kinik =

Slovak Paralympic archer (born 1986)

Personal information
- Nationality: Slovak
- Born: 21 May 1986 (age 40) Spišská Nová Ves, Czechoslovakia

Sport
- Sport: Archery
- Coached by: Jaroslav Illein
Medal record
Representing Slovakia
Paralympic Games
Archery
| Bronze medal – third place | 2016 Rio de Janeiro | Men's individual compound W1 |

Peter Kinik (born 21 May 1986) is a Slovak Paralympic archer.

In the 2016 Summer Paralympics, Kinik won his first Paralympic medal which was bronze.
