= Tereza Brandtlová =

Czech Paralympic archer

Personal information
- Born: 21 November 1985 (age 40) Prague, Czechoslovakia

Sport
- Country: Czech Republic
- Sport: Para archery
- Coached by: Ludmila Fikarová
Medal record
Para archery
Representing Czech Republic
Paralympic Games
Bronze medal – third place	2024 Paris	Individual W1
World Championships
Gold medal – first place	2023 Plzeň	Mixed team W1
Bronze medal – third place	2022 Dubai	Mixed team W1
Bronze medal – third place	2023 Plzeň	Women's doubles W1
Bronze medal – third place	2025 Gwangju	Individual W1
Bronze medal – third place	2025 Gwangju	Women's doubles W1

Tereza Brandtlová (born 21 November 1985) is a Czech Paralympic archer who competes in international archery competitions. She is a World champion in the mixed team event with David Drahonínský, she has also competed at the 2020 Summer Paralympics in the individual W1 event where she lost in the first round.
