= Lia Coryell =

American Paralympic archer (born 1965)

Personal information
- Full name: Lisa Coryell
- Born: January 26, 1965 (age 61) Black River Falls, Wisconsin, U.S.
- Home town: La Crosse, Wisconsin, U.S.

Sport
- Country: United States
- Sport: Para archery
- Disability: Multiple sclerosis
- Coached by: Randy Smith
Medal record
Para archery
Representing United States
World Championships
Gold medal – first place	2022 Dubai	Individual W1

Lisa "Lia" Coryell (born January 26, 1965) is an American Paralympic archer who competes in international archery competitions. She is a World champion and has competed at the 2016 and 2020 Summer Paralympics.

Coryell was a former Army private in 1983 at Fort Dix, she worked as a military truck driver but six months later she broke her leg. She had surgery to fix her broken leg but the nerves in her foot never recovered and was diagnosed with multiple sclerosis four years later. She medically retired from the Army in 1984.
