= Šárka Musilová =

Czech Paralympic archer (born 1991)

Personal information
- Full name: Šárka Pultar Musilová
- Born: 6 January 1991 (age 35) Trutnov, Czech Republic

Sport
- Sport: Archery
Medal record
Archery
Representing Czech Republic
Paralympic Games
Silver medal – second place	2020 Tokyo	Individual W1
Silver medal – second place	2020 Tokyo	Mixed team W1
Silver medal – second place	2024 Paris	Individual W1
Silver medal – second place	2024 Paris	Mixed team W1
Bronze medal – third place	2016 Rio de Janeiro	Mixed team W1
World Championships
Gold medal – first place	2025 Gwangju	Individual W1
Silver medal – second place	2025 Gwangju	Mixed Team W1
Bronze medal – third place	2025 Gwangju	Double W1

Šárka Pultar Musilová (born 6 January 1991) is a Czech Paralympic archer.

== Career ==
In the 2016 Summer Paralympics, her debut games, Musilová won her first Paralympic medal which was bronze.

At the 2024 Summer Paralympics held in Paris, Musilová took home the silver medal in the women’s Women's individual W1 and Mixed team W1.
