= Elisabeth Barléon =

French Paralympic archer (born 1983)

Personal information
- Nationality: French
- Born: 10 September 1983 (age 41); Colmar, France

Sport
- Country: France
- Sport: Para archery

Elisabeth Barléon (born 10 September 1983) is a French Paralympic archer.

She has competed once at the Summer Paralympics and once at the Para Continental Championships.
