= Vicky Jenkins =

British Paralympic archer (born 1977)

Personal information
- Full name: Victoria Nina Jenkins
- Nationality: British
- Born: 14 April 1977 (age 49) Worcester, Worcestershire, England

Sport
- Sport: Archery
- Coached by: Rikki Bingham
Medal record
Representing Great Britain
Paralympic Games
Archery
| Bronze medal – third place | 2016 Rio de Janeiro | Women's individual compound W1 |
European Para-Archery Championships
| Silver medal – second place | 2014 Nottwil | Compound W1 |
| Bronze medal – third place | 2016 Saint-Jean-de-Monts | Compound W1 |

Victoria Nina "Vicky" Jenkins (born 14 April 1977) is a British Paralympic archer from Malvern, Worcestershire. She made her international debut in 2014 at the European Para-Archery Championships in Nottwil, Switzerland.

In the 2016 Summer Paralympics, her debut Paralympics, Jenkins won her first Paralympic medal which was bronze.
