= Kim Ok-geum =

South Korean archer (born 1960)

Personal information
- Born: 9 March 1960 (age 66) Gwangju, South Korea

Sport
- Sport: Para-archery
Medal record
Representing South Korea
Paralympic Games
Silver medal – second place	2016 Rio de Janeiro	Mixed team W1
World Championships
Bronze medal – third place	2023 Pilsen	Mixed team W1
Asian Para Games
Gold medal – first place	2022 Hangzhou	Mixed team W1
Silver medal – second place	2018 Jakarta	Mixed team W1
Silver medal – second place	2022 Hangzhou	Individual W1
Bronze medal – third place	2014 Incheon	Individual W1

Kim Ok-geum (Korean: 김옥금; born 9 March 1960) is a South Korean Paralympic archer who competes in international archery competitions. She is a Paralympic silver medalist, World bronze medalist and Asian Para Games champion.
