= Czech Republic at the 2016 Summer Paralympics =

- IPC code: CZE
- NPC: Czech Paralympic Committee
- Website: www.paralympic.cz

in Rio de Janeiro
- Competitors: 37 in 5 sports
- Medals Ranked 51st: Gold 1 Silver 2 Bronze 4 Total 7

Summer Paralympics appearances (overview)
- 1996; 2000; 2004; 2008; 2012; 2016; 2020; 2024

Other related appearances
- Czechoslovakia (1972–1992)

Czech Republic has qualified send athletes to the 2016 Summer Paralympics in Rio de Janeiro, Brazil, from 7 September to 18 September 2016.

== Funding ==
One source of funding and support for the Czech Republic's Paralympic efforts through to the Rio Games is a local partnership with Allianz.

== Disability classifications ==
Every participant at the Paralympics has their disability grouped into one of five disability categories; amputation, the condition may be congenital or sustained through injury or illness; cerebral palsy; wheelchair athletes, there is often overlap between this and other categories; visual impairment, including blindness; Les autres, any physical disability that does not fall strictly under one of the other categories, for example dwarfism or multiple sclerosis. Each Paralympic sport then has its own classifications, dependent upon the specific physical demands of competition. Events are given a code, made of numbers and letters, describing the type of event and classification of the athletes competing. Some sports, such as athletics, divide athletes by both the category and severity of their disabilities, other sports, for example swimming, group competitors from different categories together, the only separation being based on the severity of the disability.

== Archery ==
David Drahoninsky earned Czech Republic a spot at the Rio Games following his performance at the 2015 World Archery Para Championships. He qualified the country after winning the W1 men's competition. He will go to Rio as the reigning silver medalist and after having won gold at the 2008 Games

== Cycling ==
With one pathway for qualification being one highest ranked NPCs on the UCI Para-Cycling male and female Nations Ranking Lists on 31 December 2014, the Czech Republic qualified for the 2016 Summer Paralympics in Rio, assuming they continued to meet all other eligibility requirements.

== Equestrian ==
The country earned an individual slot via the Para Equestrian Individual Ranking List Allocation method.

== Sailing ==
One pathway for qualifying for Rio involved having a boat have top seven finish at the 2015 Combined World Championships in a medal event where the country had nor already qualified through via the 2014 IFDS Sailing World Championships. Austria qualified for the 2016 Games under this criterion in the 2.4m event with a fourteenth-place finish overall and the fourth country who had not qualified via the 2014 Championships. The boat was crewed by Daniel Bina.

== Swimming ==
The top two finishers in each Rio medal event at the 2015 IPC Swimming World Championships earned a qualifying spot for their country for Rio. Bela Trebinova earned the Czech Republic a spot after winning silver in the Women's 50m Backstroke S5.

== See also ==
- Czech Republic at the 2016 Summer Olympics
