= Jessica Stretton =

British Paralympic archer (born 2000)

Jessica Stretton MBE
Personal information
- Born: 23 March 2000 (age 26) London, England

Sport
- Sport: Archery
Medal record
Representing Great Britain
Paralympic Games
Archery
Gold medal – first place	2016 Rio de Janeiro	Women's individual compound W1
World Para Archery Championships
Bronze medal – third place	2015 Donaueschingen	Compound W1
Bronze medal – third place	2025 Gwangju	Doubles Open
European Para-Archery Championships
Silver medal – second place	2016 Saint-Jean-de-Monts	Compound W1

Jessica Stretton (born 23 March 2000) is a British Paralympic archer with cerebral palsy.

In the 2016 Summer Paralympics, her debut Paralympics, Stretton won her first Paralympic medal, which was gold, at the age of 16. She became Great Britain's youngest ever medallist in archery.

Stretton was appointed Member of the Order of the British Empire (MBE) in the 2017 New Year Honours for services to archery.
