= 2016 Summer Paralympics =

Multi-parasport event in Rio de Janeiro, Brazil

XV Paralympic Games
- Location: Rio de Janeiro, Brazil
- Motto: A new world (Portuguese: Um mundo novo)
- Nations: 160
- Athletes: 4,328
- Events: 528 in 22 sports
- Opening: 7 September 2016
- Closing: 18 September 2016
- Opened by: Michel Temer; President of Brazil
- Closed by: Philip Craven; President of the International Paralympic Committee
- Cauldron: Clodoaldo Silva
- Stadium: Estádio do Maracanã

The 2016 Summer Paralympics (Portuguese: Jogos Paralímpicos de Verão de 2016), the 15th Summer Paralympic Games, were a major international multi-sport event for athletes with disabilities governed by the International Paralympic Committee, held in Rio de Janeiro, Brazil, from 7 to 18 September 2016. The Games marked the first time a Latin American and South American city hosted the event, the second Southern Hemisphere city and nation, the first one being the 2000 Summer Paralympics in Sydney, and also the first time a Lusophone (Portuguese-speaking) country hosted the event. These Games saw the introduction of two new sports to the Paralympic program: canoeing and the paratriathlon.

The lead-up to these Paralympics was met with financial shortcomings attributed to tepid sponsor interest and ticket sales, which resulted in cuts to volunteer staffing and transport, the re-location of events and the partial deconstruction of the Deodoro venue cluster. However, ticket sales began to increase as the Games drew nearer, and over two million tickets were sold in total—overtaking Beijing 2008 as the second-most-attended Paralympic Games on record.

A refugee Paralympic team was hosted for the first time, featuring two refugees from Iran and Syria respectively. For the fourth consecutive Summer Paralympics, China topped the medal table, winning 107 gold medals, followed by Great Britain and Ukraine, while Georgia, Kazakhstan, Malaysia, Uzbekistan, and Vietnam won their first ever Paralympic gold medals. For the first time in Paralympic history, and the first time in the Olympics or Paralympics since 1960, an athlete—Iranian cyclist Bahman Golbarnezhad—died during competition.

== Bidding process ==
As part of a formal agreement between the International Paralympic Committee and the International Olympic Committee first established in 2001, the winner of the bid for the 2016 Summer Olympics was also to host the 2016 Summer Paralympics. Following the third and final round of voting at the 121st IOC Session in Copenhagen on 2 October 2009, the right to host the 2016 Summer Olympics and Paralympics were awarded to Rio de Janeiro.

2016 Summer Olympics bidding results
City	NOC/NPC	Round 1	Round 2	Round 3
Rio de Janeiro	Brazil	26	46	66
Madrid	Spain	28	29	32
Tokyo	Japan	22	20	—
Chicago	United States	18	—	—

== Development and preparation ==
The 2007 Pan American Games and Parapan American Games in Rio de Janeiro marked the first time that the Pan Am Games and Parapan Am Games were hosted as parallel events in the same host city; Rio's organization of the two events helped provide the city with experience in hosting multi-sport events, and Paralympic sporting events. Andrew Parsons, president of the Brazilian Paralympic Committee, remarked that the organizing teams responsible for the Olympics and Paralympics were maintaining a good relationship and "speaking the same language" in relation to their organizational duties. Parsons praised how well-organized the 2012 Summer Paralympics were, and felt that his team had learned lessons from London that could be applied in Rio.

=== Venues ===
Map of Rio de Janeiro showing the competition venues for the 2016 Summer Olympics.

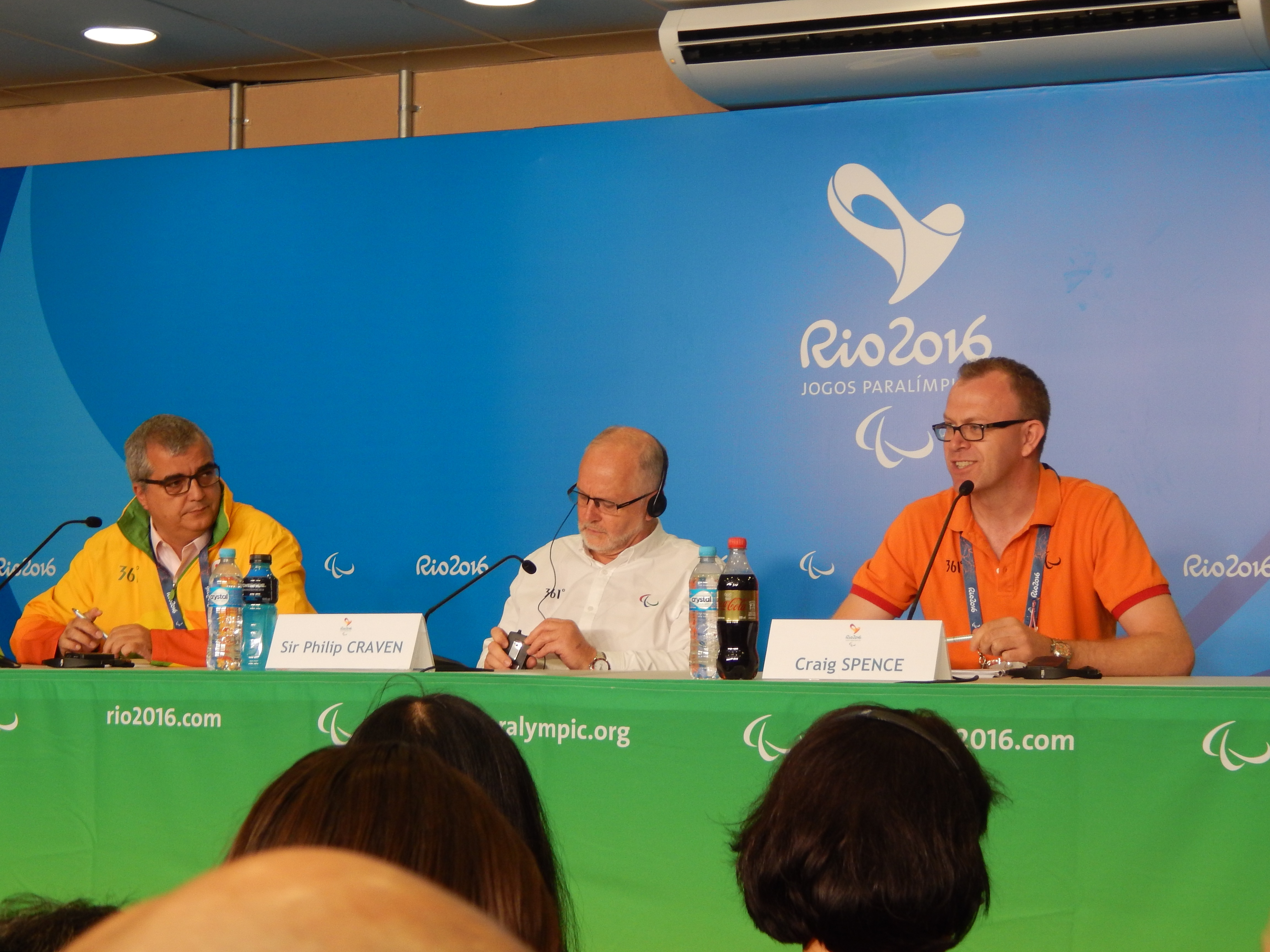
Press conference at the 2016 Rio Paralympics with Mario Andrada, Sir Philip Craven and Craig Spence

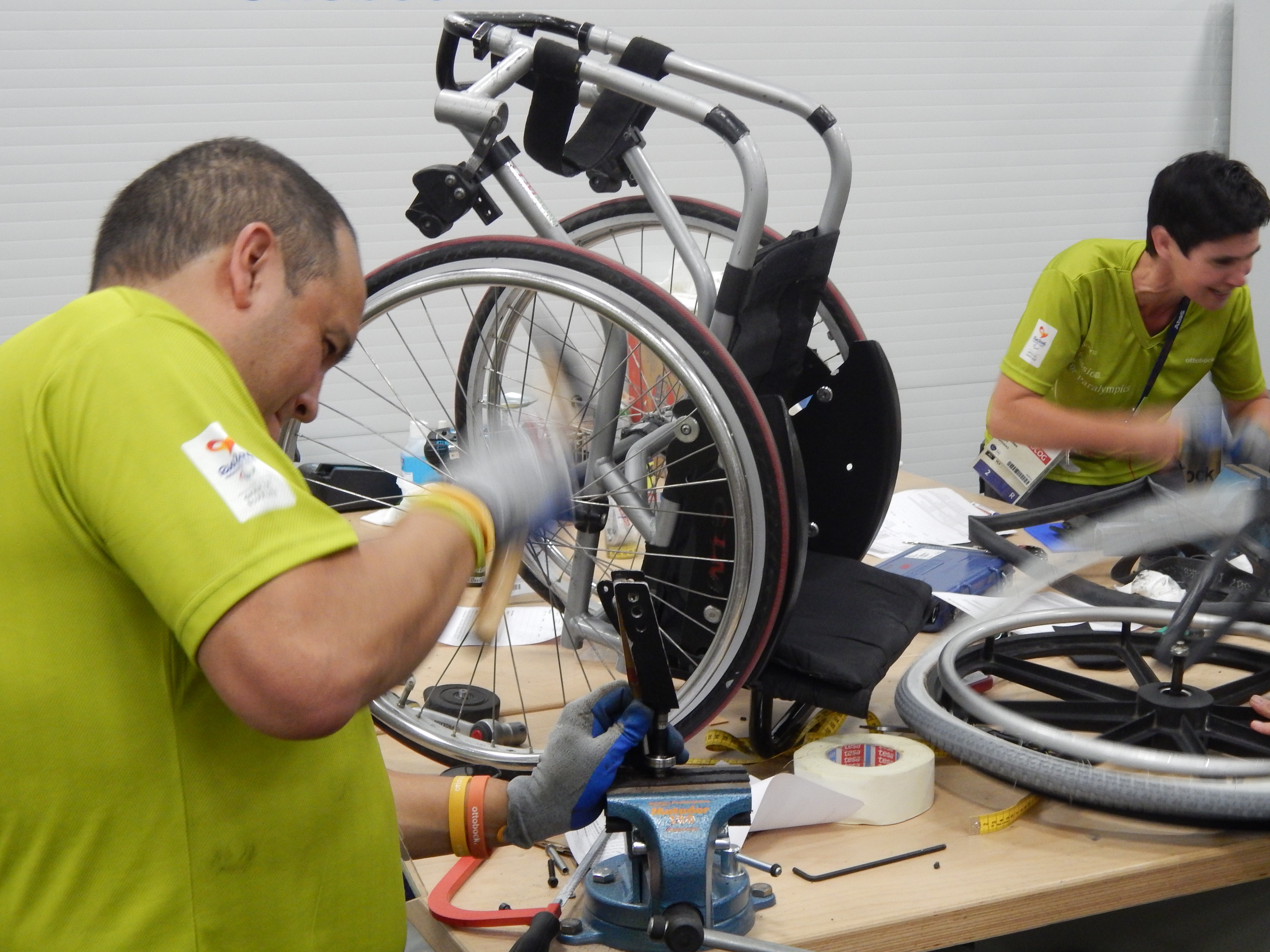
Wheelchair repair. During the games Ottobock technicians repaired 2,745 wheelchairs, 438 prosthetics and 178 orthotics for 1,162 athletes.

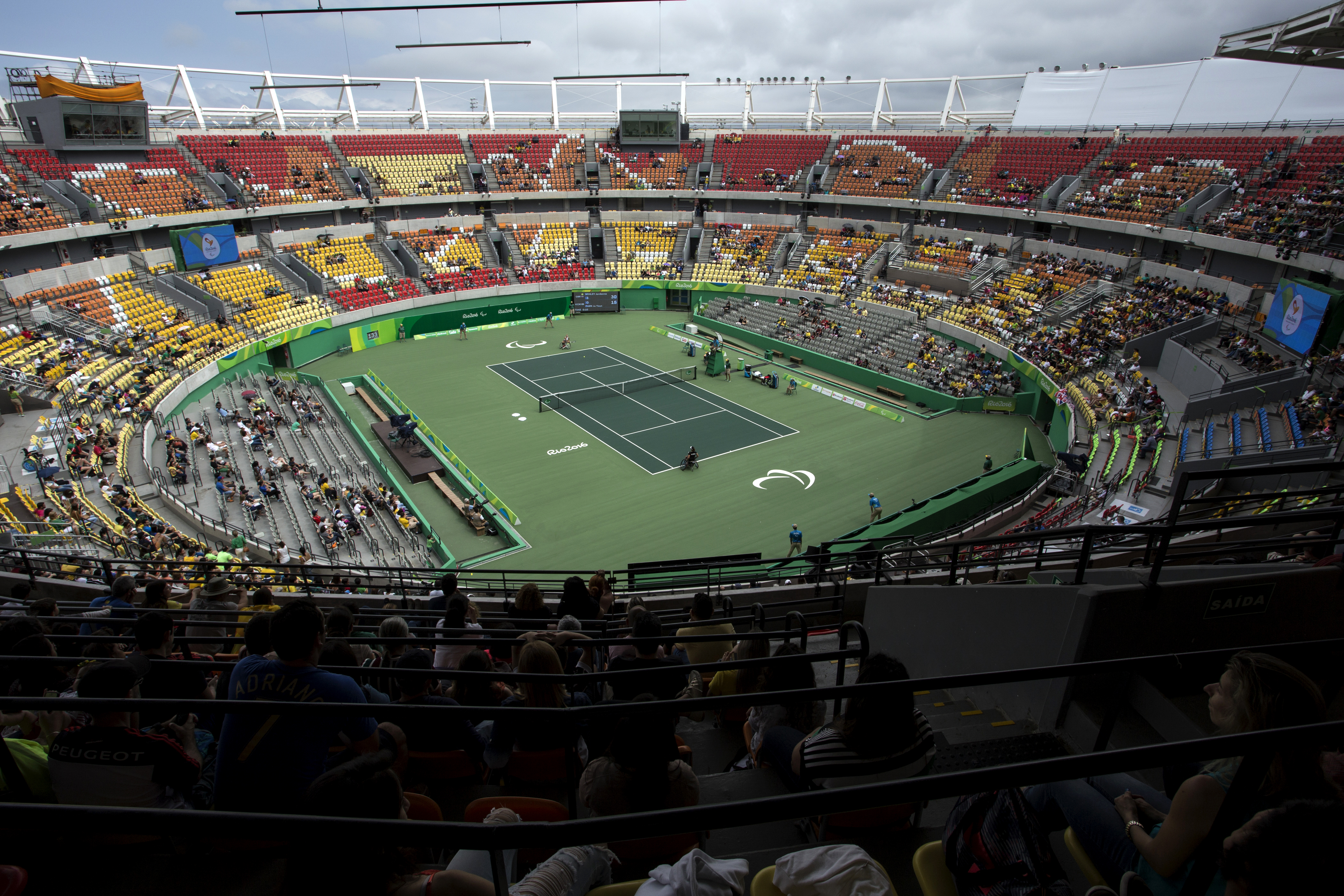
The Tennis Arena during the Paralympics competitions.

As had been common practice since the Olympics and Paralympics began to formally share host cities, the Paralympics' venues were shared with those of the 2016 Summer Olympics. Barra da Tijuca hosted most of the venues, with the remainder located in Copacabana Beach, Maracanã and Deodoro. Barra da Tijuca also housed the athletes' village.

==== Barra cluster ====
- Carioca Arena 1 – Wheelchair basketball, wheelchair rugby
- Carioca Arena 2 – Boccia
- Carioca Arena 3 – Judo, wheelchair fencing
- Future Arena – Goalball
- Olympic Aquatics Stadium – Swimming
- Olympic Tennis Centre – 5-a-side football, wheelchair tennis
- Pontal Beach – Road cycling
- Riocentro – Powerlifting, Sitting volleyball, table tennis
- Rio Olympic Arena – Wheelchair basketball
- Rio Olympic Velodrome – Track cycling

==== Deodoro cluster ====
- National Shooting Center – shooting
- National Equestrian Center – equestrian
- Deodoro Stadium – 7-a-side football

==== Maracanã cluster ====
- Maracanã Stadium – opening and closing ceremonies
- Estádio Olímpico João Havelange – athletics (track and field)
- Sambadrome Marquês de Sapucaí – archery

==== Copacabana cluster ====
- Fort Copacabana – Athletics, Triathlon and Road Cycling
- Marina da Glória – sailing
- Lagoa Rodrigo de Freitas – canoeing and rowing

=== Medals ===
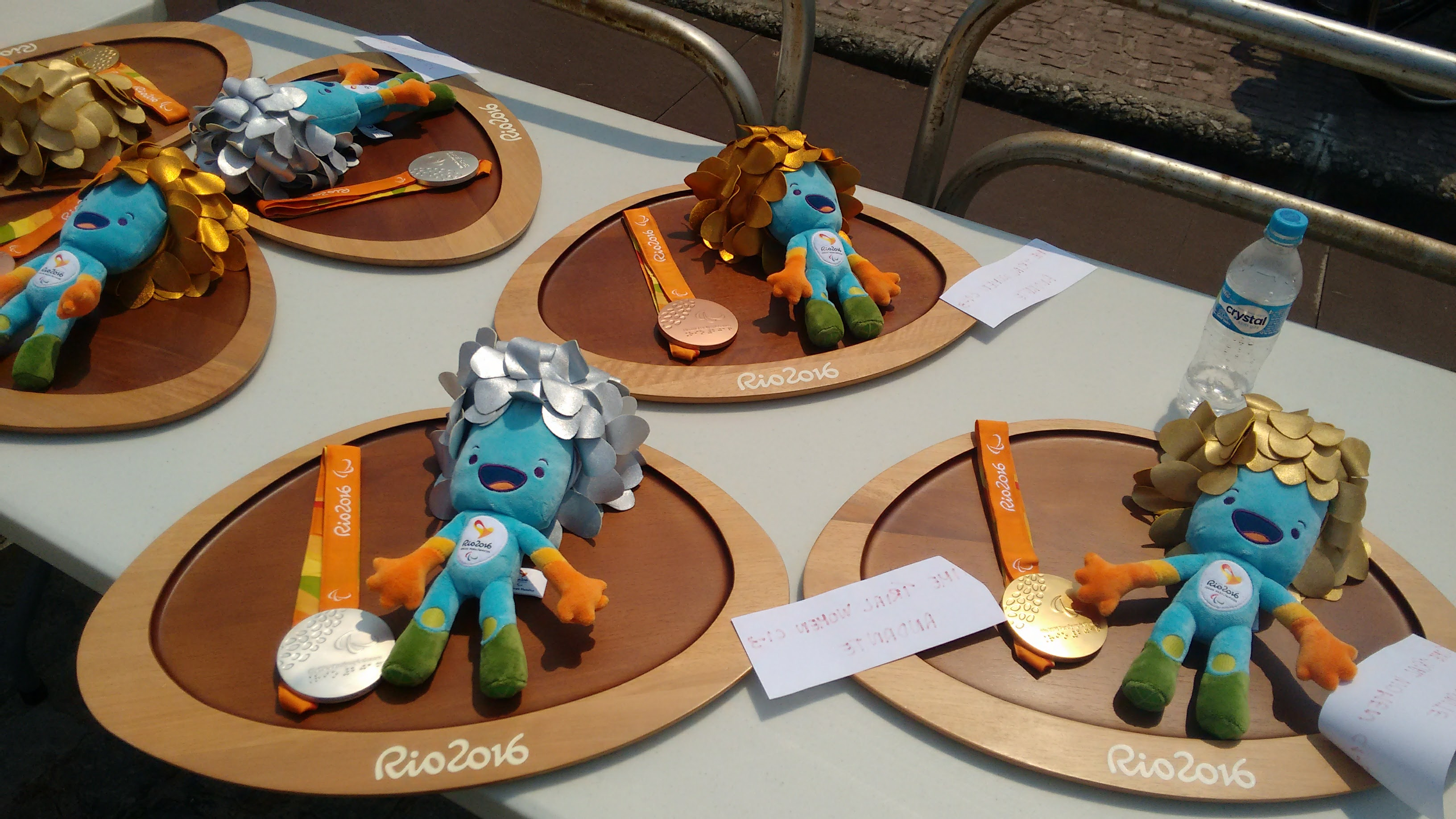
Paralympic medals and the mascot Tom.

The medal design for the 2016 Olympics and Paralympics were unveiled on 14 June 2016; they were produced by the Casa da Moeda do Brasil. The bronze and silver medals contain 30% recycled materials, while the gold medals were produced using gold that had been mined and extracted using means that met a series of sustainability criteria, such as being extracted without the use of mercury. The obverse of the Paralympic medals feature the Paralympic emblem and an inscription in braille, while each medal contains differing numbers of metal balls to allow the visually impaired to audibly distinguish their color by shaking them. They are accompanied by a wooden carrying box, and a plush toy of Paralympic mascot Tom with hair leaves that match the medal's color.

=== Ticketing ===
The initial financial shortcomings of the 2016 Paralympics were primarily attributed to slow ticket sales and poor public interest, despite the cheapest tickets only costing roughly a quarter of those for the Olympics. During the Olympics, organizers stated that only 12% of an original target of 3.3 million tickets had been sold. By early September, only half of the tickets to medal events had been sold.

On 23 August 2016, Greg Nugent, who was head of marketing of the 2012 Summer Olympics and 2012 Summer Paralympics, began a campaign on Twitter known as "#FillTheSeats", encouraging users to donate money to supply local youth and people with disabilities with tickets to the Paralympics. Nugent began the campaign after noticing the large number of empty seats at competition venues during the 2016 Summer Olympics. Following endorsements of the campaign by prominent figures, such as British band Coldplay (which performed the closing ceremony in 2012), it raised over US$15,000 by 30 August. On 31 August 2016, the IPC and the Rio 2016 Organizing Committee announced that it would officially back the #FillTheSeats campaign, and set a new goal of $300,000—which the IPC said could be used to fund the distribution of 10,000 tickets, along with food and transport, for the opening ceremony to Brazilian scholars and disabled peoples.

As part of a revised ticketing strategy, the organizers set a new target of 2.4 million tickets, with the cheapest tickets costing R$10 (US$3) each. Ticketing director Donovan Ferreti told The Guardian that a "last-minute" demand for tickets had begun to develop in the final days before the opening ceremony. He explained that the tickets were "really affordable" and "cheaper than going to see a movie", and would allow spectators to "have a great time with high-performance competition and have a great day out in the Olympic Park." The low cost of tickets helped to attract attendees to the Paralympics—especially families, while athletes praised the large and energetic crowds that resulted.

On the third day of the Games, the IPC announced that at least 1.8 million tickets had been sold—surpassing the 1.7 million of the 2008 Summer Paralympics in Beijing as the second-largest Paralympics in terms of ticket sales. The next day, Barra Olympic Park had a total attendance of 167,675, marking its largest overall attendance across a single day of competition during either the Olympics or Paralympics (the Olympics only reached a peak of around 157,000). On 14 September, the IPC announced that sales had exceeded 2 million.

== Torch relay ==
The Paralympic torch relay began with five individual flames being relayed to a city in each of the five regions of Brazil. These flames, as well as a sixth flame lit in Stoke Mandeville, Great Britain, were united to form a single Paralympic flame, which was relayed through Rio on 6 and 7 September 2016 en route to its lighting at the Maracanã during the opening ceremony.

== Marketing ==
=== Emblem ===
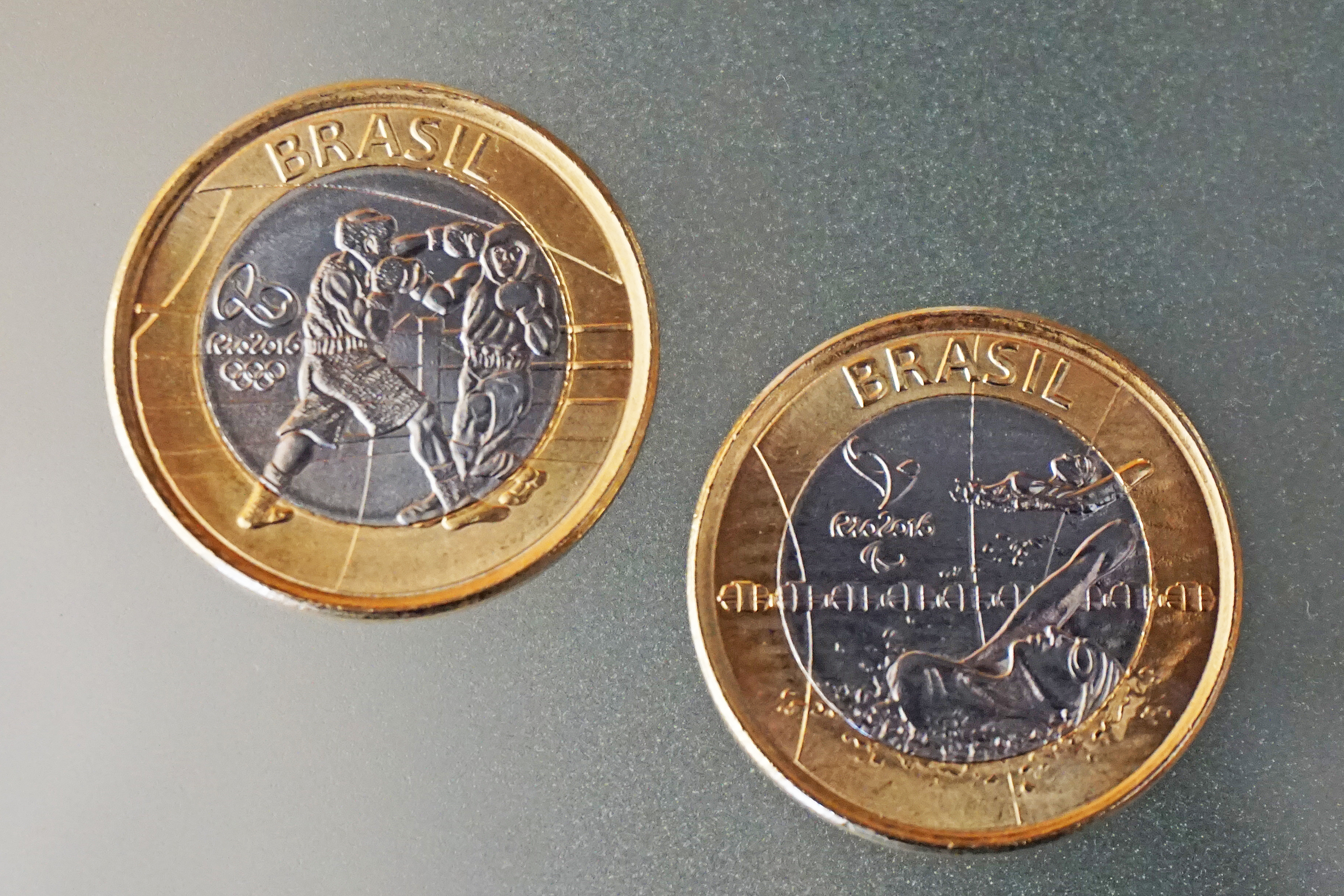
Commemorative R$1 coins honouring the 2016 Summer Olympics and Paralympics.

The official emblem for the 2016 Summer Paralympics was designed by the Brazilian agency Tatíl Design, and unveiled on 26 November 2011 during the Christmas tree lighting at the Lagoa Rodrigo de Freitas. It consists of a heart incorporating the infinity symbol, representing a beating heart and an "infinite energy to overcome obstacles". IPC president Philip Craven described the emblem as symbolizing the "heart" of athletes, who were the "heart" of the Paralympic movement.

As with the Olympic emblem, the Paralympic emblem was designed so that it could also be rendered in two- and three-dimensional versions, such as a sculpture that was used during the unveiling.

=== Mascot ===
Tom (right), the mascot of the 2016 Summer Paralympics, and Vinicius (left), the mascot of the 2016 Summer Olympics

The official mascots of the 2016 Summer Olympics and Paralympics were unveiled on 24 November 2014, with their respective names, Vinicius and Tom, chosen via a public vote whose results were announced on 14 December 2014. The Paralympic mascot, Tom, is named after Brazilian musician Tom Jobim; it represents Brazilian flora and "is always growing and overcoming obstacles." The mascots' fictional backstories state that they were both born from the joy of Brazilians after it was announced that Rio would host the Games. Brand director Beth Lula stated that the mascots are intended to reflect the diversity of Brazil's culture and people.

== The Games ==
=== Opening ceremony ===
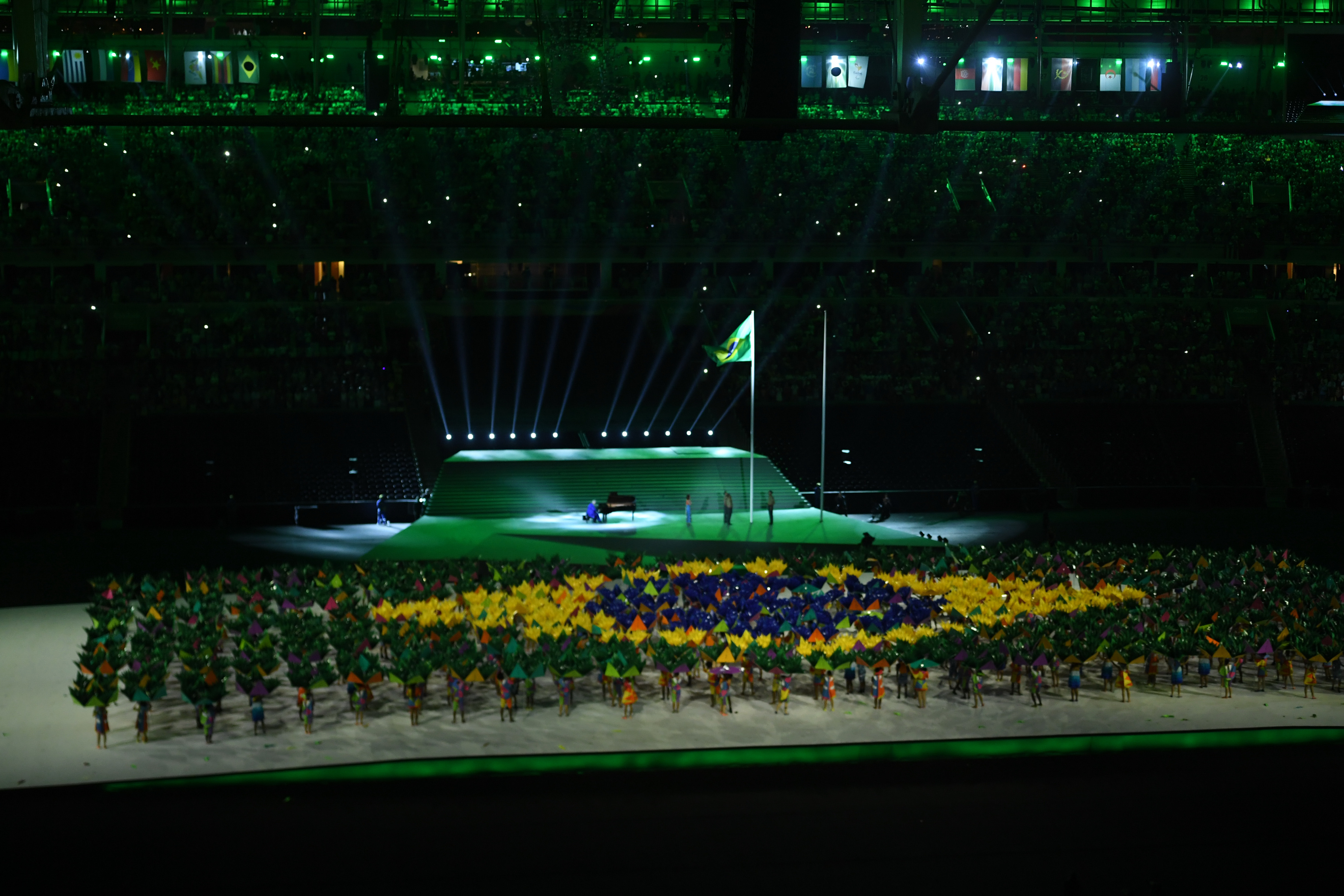
A group forms the flag of Brazil during the Brazilian national anthem at the opening ceremony.

The opening ceremony of the 2016 Summer Paralympics took place on the evening of 7 September 2016 at Maracanã Stadium, which was also Brazilian Independence Day. With the theme "Todo Mundo tem um Coração" ("Everybody Has a Heart"), the artistic portions of the ceremony featured sequences themed around inclusivity and the culture of Brazil. The segment "Beyond Vision" was created by computation artist and designer Marcelo Coelho with projections by Muti Randolph.

During the parade of nations, a Belarusian official carried a Russian flag alongside his delegation as solidarity towards the IPC's decision to ban Russia from the Games. In the wake of ongoing protests over political instability in Brazil, spectators also booed organizing committee head Carlos Arthur Nuzman after he thanked local governments for their role in organizing the Games, and President Michel Temer whilst he opened the Games, in response to the recent impeachment of former president Dilma Rousseff.

In an opening speech, IPC president Philip Craven invited viewers to "see the true meaning of sport and the true definition of ability", explaining that "in a country which has faced major challenges of late, Paralympians will switch your focus from perceived limitations, to a world full of possibility and endless opportunity. They will surprise you, inspire and excite you, but most of all they will change you." The Paralympic cauldron was lit by legendary Brazilian para-swimmer Clodoaldo Silva.

=== Participating nations ===
4,342 athletes representing 159 National Paralympic Committees competed in Rio. The number of athletes sent by each nation is shown beside its name. This is also the first Summer Paralympics event where Russia is not participating, owing to the doping allegations. Aruba, Congo, Malawi, São Tomé and Príncipe, Somalia, and Togo made their debut in the Summer Paralympics.

The IPC unanimously voted to ban Russian athletes from the 2016 Summer Paralympics in response to the discovery of a state-sponsored doping program. On 5 August 2016, the IPC announced that it would field a team of refugee athletes known as the Independent Paralympic Athletes Team, which competed under the Paralympic flag. The 2016 Summer Olympics similarly featured a team of 10 refugee athletes. On 26 August 2016, the IPC announced the two members of the refugee team: swimmer Ibrahim Al Hussein of Syria (50 and 100 metre Freestyle S10), and Shahrad Nasajpour of Iran (F37 Discus).

Participating National Paralympic Committees
- Afghanistan (1)
- Algeria (60)
- Angola (4)
- Argentina (84)
- Armenia (2)
- Aruba (1)
- Australia (177)
- Austria (27)
- Azerbaijan (25)
- Bahrain (2)
- Belarus (20)
- Belgium (29)
- Benin (1)
- Bermuda (2)
- Bosnia and Herzegovina (14)
- Botswana (1)
- Brazil (285) (host)
- Bulgaria (7)
- Burkina Faso (1)
- Burundi (1)
- Cambodia (1)
- Cameroon (1)
- Canada (153)
- Cape Verde (2)
- Central African Republic (1)
- Chile (15)
- China (308)
- Colombia (39)
- Comoros (1)
- Republic of the Congo (1)
- Costa Rica (3)
- Croatia (19)
- Cuba (22)
- Cyprus (2)
- Czech Republic (37)
- Denmark (21)
- Democratic Republic of the Congo (2)
- Dominican Republic (2)
- Ecuador (5)
- Egypt (45)
- El Salvador (1)
- Estonia (6)
- Ethiopia (5)
- Faroe Islands (1)
- Fiji (2)
- Finland (26)
- France (123)
- Gabon (1)
- The Gambia (1)
- Georgia (5)
- Germany (155)
- Ghana (3)
- Great Britain (264)
- Greece (60)
- Guatemala (1)
- Guinea (1)
- Guinea-Bissau (1)
- Haiti (1)
- Honduras (2)
- Hong Kong (24)
- Hungary (43)
- Iceland (5)
- India (19)
- Indonesia (9)
- Individual Paralympic Athletes (2)
- Iran (110)
- Iraq (14)
- Ireland (44)
- Israel (33)
- Italy (101)
- Ivory Coast (5)
- Jamaica (3)
- Japan (132)
- Jordan (10)
- Kazakhstan (11)
- Kenya (19)
- Kuwait (6)
- Kyrgyzstan (3)
- Laos (1)
- Latvia (11)
- Lesotho (2)
- Libya (3)
- Lithuania (13)
- Luxembourg (3)
- Macau (1)
- Macedonia (2)
- Madagascar (1)
- Malawi (1)
- Malaysia (19)
- Mali (2)
- Malta (1)
- Mauritius (2)
- Mexico (71)
- Moldova (3)
- Mongolia (8)
- Montenegro (2)
- Morocco (26)
- Mozambique (1)
- Myanmar (2)
- Namibia (10)
- Nepal (2)
- Netherlands (120)
- New Zealand (31)
- Nicaragua (3)
- Niger (2)
- Nigeria (23)
- North Korea (2)
- Norway (25)
- Oman (2)
- Pakistan (1)
- Palestine (1)
- Panama (2)
- Papua New Guinea (2)
- Peru (6)
- Philippines (5)
- Poland (90)
- Portugal (37)
- Puerto Rico (4)
- Qatar (3)
- Romania (12)
- Rwanda (13)
- Samoa (2)
- São Tomé and Príncipe (1)
- Saudi Arabia (3)
- Senegal (2)
- Serbia (16)
- Seychelles (1)
- Sierra Leone (1)
- Singapore (13)
- Slovakia (28)
- Slovenia (8)
- Somalia (1)
- South Africa (44)
- South Korea (82)
- Spain (113)
- Sri Lanka (9)
- Suriname (1)
- Sweden (58)
- Switzerland (24)
- Syria (2)
- Chinese Taipei (13)
- Tajikistan (1)
- Tanzania (1)
- Thailand (45)
- Timor-Leste (2)
- Togo (1)
- Tonga (2)
- Trinidad and Tobago (3)
- Tunisia (31)
- Turkey (81)
- Turkmenistan (2)
- Uganda (1)
- Ukraine (168)
- United Arab Emirates (18)
- United States (279)
- Uruguay (4)
- Uzbekistan (32)
- Venezuela (23)
- Vietnam (11)
- Virgin Islands (1)
- Zimbabwe (6)

==== Number of athletes by National Paralympic Committees (by highest to lowest) ====
IPC	Country	Athletes
CHN	China	308
BRA	Brazil	285
USA	United States	279
GBR	Great Britain	264
RUS	Russia	322
AUS	Australia	177
UKR	Ukraine	168
GER	Germany	155
CAN	Canada	153
JPN	Japan	132
FRA	France	126
NED	Netherlands	120
ESP	Spain	113
IRI	Iran	110
ITA	Italy	101
POL	Poland	90
ARG	Argentina	84
KOR	South Korea	82
TUR	Turkey	81
MEX	Mexico	71
ALG	Algeria	60
SWE	Sweden	58
RSA	South Africa	44
EGY	Egypt	45
THA	Thailand	45
IRL	Ireland	44
HUN	Hungary	43
COL	Colombia	39
CZE	Czech Republic	37
POR	Portugal	37
ISR	Israel	33
UZB	Uzbekistan	32
NZL	New Zealand	31
TUN	Tunisia	31
BEL	Belgium	29
SVK	Slovakia	28
AUT	Austria	27
FIN	Finland	26
MAR	Morocco	26
AZE	Azerbaijan	25
NOR	Norway	25
HKG	Hong Kong	24
SUI	Switzerland	24
VEN	Venezuela	23
CUB	Cuba	22
DEN	Denmark	21
BLR	Belarus	20
CRO	Croatia	19
IND	India	19
KEN	Kenya	19
MAS	Malaysia	19
UAE	United Arab Emirates	18
SRB	Serbia	16
CHI	Chile	15
BIH	Bosnia and Herzegovina	14
IRQ	Iraq	14
LTU	Lithuania	13
RWA	Rwanda	13
SIN	Singapore	13
TPE	Chinese Taipei	13
ROU	Romania	12
KAZ	Kazakhstan	11
LAT	Latvia	11
VIE	Vietnam	11
JOR	Jordan	10
NAM	Namibia	10
SRI	Sri Lanka	9
INA	Indonesia	9
PUR	Puerto Rico	9
MGL	Mongolia	8
SLO	Slovenia	8
BUL	Bulgaria	7
EST	Estonia	6
KUW	Kuwait	6
PER	Peru	6
ZIM	Zimbabwe	6
ECU	Ecuador	5
ETH	Ethiopia	5
GEO	Georgia	5
ISL	Iceland	5
CIV	Ivory Coast	5
PHI	Philippines	5
ANG	Angola	4
URU	Uruguay	4
CRC	Costa Rica	3
GHA	Ghana	3
JAM	Jamaica	3
KGZ	Kyrgyzstan	3
LBA	Libya	3
LUX	Luxembourg	3
MDA	Moldova	3
QAT	Qatar	3
KSA	Saudi Arabia	3
TRI	Trinidad and Tobago	3
ARM	Armenia	2
BRN	Bahrain	2
BER	Bermuda	2
CPV	Cape Verde	2
CYP	Cyprus	2
COD	Democratic Republic of the Congo	2
DOM	Dominican Republic	2
FIJ	Fiji	2
HON	Honduras	2
IPA	Individual Paralympic Athletes	2
LES	Lesotho	2
MLI	Mali	2
MRI	Mauritius	2
MNE	Montenegro	2
MYA	Myanmar	2
NEP	Nepal	2
NCA	Nicaragua	2
NIG	Niger	2
NGE	Madagascar	2
PRK	North Korea	2
OMA	Oman	2
PAN	Panama	2
PNG	Papua New Guinea	2
SAM	Samoa	2
SEN	Senegal	2
SYR	Syria	2
TLS	Timor-Leste	2
TGA	Tonga	2
TKM	Turkmenistan	2
MKD	Macedonia	1
AFG	Afghanistan	1
ARU	Aruba	1
BEN	Benin	1
BOT	Botswana	1
BUR	Burkina Faso	1
BDI	Burundi	1
CAM	Cambodia	1
CMR	Cameroon	1
CAF	Central African Republic	1
CGO	Republic of the Congo	1
ESA	El Salvador	1
FRO	Faroe Islands	1
GAB	Gabon	1
GAM	The Gambia	1
GUA	Guatemala	1
GUI	Guinea	1
GBS	Guinea-Bissau	1
HAI	Haiti	1
LAO	Laos	1
MAC	Macau	1
MAD	Madagascar	1
MAW	Malawi	1
MLT	Malta	1
MOZ	Mozambique	1
PAK	Pakistan	1
PLE	Palestine	1
STP	São Tomé and Príncipe	1
SEY	Seychelles	1
SLE	Sierra Leone	1
SOM	Somalia	1
SUR	Suriname	1
TJK	Tajikistan	1
TAN	Tanzania	1
TOG	Togo	1
UGA	Uganda	1
ISV	Virgin Islands	1
Total		4,342

=== Sports ===
Events in 22 sports were contested at the 2016 Summer Paralympics. Para canoe and para triathlon made their Paralympic debut in Rio.

- Archery
- Athletics
- Boccia
- Canoe
- Cycling
  - Road
  - Track
- Equestrian
- Football 5-a-side
- Football 7-a-side
- Goalball
- Judo
- Powerlifting
- Rowing
- Sailing
- Shooting
- Sitting volleyball
- Swimming
- Table tennis
- Triathlon
- Wheelchair basketball
- Wheelchair fencing
- Wheelchair rugby
- Wheelchair tennis

=== Closing ceremony ===
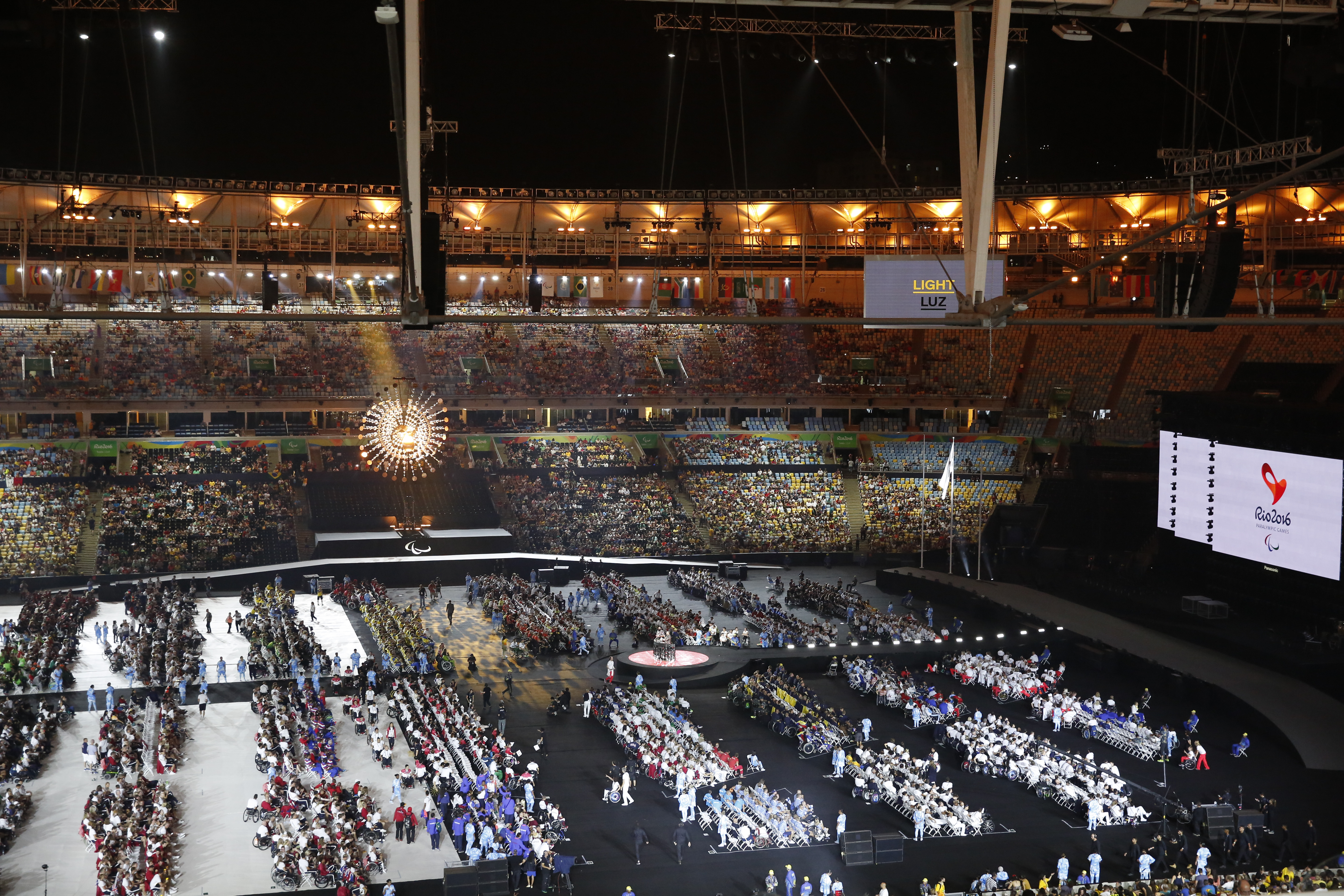
Maracanã Stadium minutes before the start of the closing ceremony.

The closing ceremony of the 2016 Summer Paralympics took place on the evening of 18 September 2016 at the Maracanã Stadium. The cultural program of the ceremony was a concert featuring performances by an array of mainstream Brazilian musicians, headlined by Ivete Sangalo and Gaby Amarantos. British singer Calum Scott joined Sangalo to perform "Transformar", the official promotional song of the Games. It also featured a cultural presentation by Tokyo, host of the 2020 Summer Paralympics

IPC president Philip Craven led a moment of silence for Iranian cyclist Bahman Golbarnezhad (who was killed the day before in a road cycling accident), stating that his death had "affected us all and left the whole Paralympic Movement united in grief." Craven went on to praise Brazil's reception to the Games and the overall performances of athletes, stating that people "were in awe at what you could do and forgot about what they believed you could not. You showed to the world that with a positive attitude the human body, and above all the human heart and mind, knows no limits and absolutely anything is possible." Craven also announced that he would bestow the Paralympic Order—the IPC's highest honour, on the people of Brazil and Rio de Janeiro for their "outstanding support" of the Paralympics.

== Calendar ==
All dates are Brasília Time (UTC–3)

OC	Opening ceremony	●	Event competitions	1	Gold medal events	CC	Closing ceremony

September		7 Wed	8 Thu	9 Fri	10 Sat	11 Sun	12 Mon	13 Tue	14 Wed	15 Thu	16 Fri	17 Sat	18 Sun	Events
Ceremonies		OC											CC	—N/a
Archery					●	1	1	1	1	1	2	2		9
Athletics			10	20	16	19	14	19	14	20	15	25	5	177
Boccia					●	●	3	●	●	●	4			7
Canoe									●	6				6
Cycling	Road								18	6	5	4		50
Cycling	Track		4	5	5	3								50
Equestrian						●	●	1	2	2	6			11
Football	5-a-side			●		●		●		●		1		2
Football	7-a-side		●		●		●		●		1			2
Goalball			●	●	●	●	●	●	●	●	2			2
Judo			4	4	5									13
Powerlifting			2	3	3	3	3	3	3					20
Rowing				●	●	4								4
Sailing							●	●	●	●	●	3		3
Shooting			2	2	2	1	1	2	2					12
Sitting volleyball				●	●	●	●	●	●	●	1	1		2
Swimming			16	16	14	15	16	15	15	14	16	15		152
Table tennis			●	●	●	5	8	8	●	●	4	4		29
Triathlon					3	3								6
Wheelchair basketball			●	●	●	●	●	●	●	●	1	1		2
Wheelchair fencing							2	4	4	2	2			14
Wheelchair rugby									●	●	●	●	1	1
Wheelchair tennis				●	●	●	●	1	1	2	2			6
Daily medal events		0	38	50	48	54	48	54	50	54	65	61	6	528
Cumulative total		0	38	88	136	190	238	292	342	396	461	522	528	528
September		7 Wed	8 Thu	9 Fri	10 Sat	11 Sun	12 Mon	13 Tue	14 Wed	15 Thu	16 Fri	17 Sat	18 Sun	Events

== Medal table ==
* Host nation (Brazil)

2016 Summer Paralympics medal table
Rank	NPC	Gold	Silver	Bronze	Total
1	China	107	81	51	239
2	Great Britain	64	39	44	147
3	Ukraine	41	37	39	117
4	United States	40	44	31	115
5	Australia	22	30	29	81
6	Germany	18	25	14	57
7	Netherlands	17	19	26	62
8	Brazil*	14	29	29	72
9	Italy	10	14	15	39
10	Poland	9	18	12	39
11–83	Remaining	187	193	249	629
Totals (83 entries)		529	529	539	1,597

=== Podium Sweeps ===
Date	Sport	Event	NPC	Gold	Silver	Bronze
11 September	Swimming	Men's 200 metre individual medley SM10	Ukraine	Denys Dubrov	Maksym Krypak	Dmytro Vanzenko
11 September	Paratriathlon	Women's PT2	United States	Allysa Seely	Hailey Danisewicz	Melissa Stockwell
13 September	Athletics	Women's 1500 metres T54	United States	Tatyana McFadden	Amanda McGrory	Chelsea McClammer
17 September	Archery	Women's individual compound W1	Great Britain	Jessica Stretton	Jo Frith	Vicky Jenkins

== Broadcasting ==
On 24 August 2016, the IPC announced that Dailymotion would serve as the official online streaming partner for the 2016 Summer Paralympics, offering 15 English-language streaming channels with full broadcasts of athletics, cycling, football, judo, powerlifting, sitting volleyball, swimming, table tennis, wheelchair basketball, wheelchair fencing, wheelchair rugby and wheelchair tennis events, as well as the ceremonies, highlights from all events, news programmes, and other original content. In total, the IPC stated that around 680 hours of content would be streamed over the 11-day event, with at least 72 hours per-day.

Television rights were also sold to individual countries: Grupo Globo held rights in Brazil, with coverage shown on Rede Globo and SporTV. Globo also sublicensed over-the-air rights to the public network TV Brasil.

In the United Kingdom, Channel 4 broadcast the Games as its second Summer Paralympics, promising 500 hours of coverage. As a follow-up to its "Meet the Superhumans" trailer for the 2012 Paralympics, Channel 4 produced a trailer entitled "We're the Superhumans", which would win a Cannes Lions Grand Prix for film.

In Australia, the Seven Network held rights, complementing a new long-term rights deal for the Olympics. Seven plans to broadcast 14 hours per-day of coverage on television. Coverage was primarily broadcast by its digital channel 7Two and Seven's digital platforms, as well as a Paralympics-specific app.

In Canada, CBC, Sportsnet One and AMI-tv held broadcast rights, promoting 1000 hours of coverage in total on television and the CBC Sports website. CBC Television aired the ceremonies, a nightly recap show, and afternoon and evening coverage blocks on weekends.

In Latin America (except Brazil), Claro Sports, ESPN and Fox Sports held the rights broadcast the 2016 Summer Paralympics.

NBC acquired the rights to the 2014 and 2016 Paralympics in September 2013. NBC planned extensive coverage for both games, capitalizing on its newly acquired status of an official Paralympic broadcaster in the United States.

In Sweden, state broadcaster SVT broadcast the Games, planning 300 hours of coverage on television and digital platforms, as well as a nightly highlights show.

In Poland, state broadcaster TVP broadcast the games for the first time.

In New Zealand, Attitude Pictures and Television New Zealand partnered to broadcast 180 hours of live and delayed television coverage, plus on-demand highlights through their respective digital platforms.

== Concerns and controversies ==
=== Budget cuts ===
The budget of the 2016 Summer Paralympics faced several rounds of cuts, although the Rio 2016 Organizing Committee did not provide specific details on the deficits.

In mid-August 2016, it was reported that the Rio 2016 Organizing Committee had failed to timely deliver US$8 million in travel grants that were intended to be paid out at the end of July. Without these grants, National Paralympic Committees may have had to cover a larger share of the cost of transporting their athletes to the Games, while some (particularly those in African and Asian regions) might not have been able to afford sending their athletes to Rio at all. On 15 August 2016, a spokesperson for the organizing committee credited the financial issues to the political climate making it harder to reach sponsorship deals, as well as ticket sales being below expectations. However, the spokesperson noted that the ongoing Olympics were helping to attract interest from potential sponsors. The ROC stated that it planned to deliver the money by the end of the month and that there was "no intention" to "compromise the Paralympic experience". Mayor of Rio Eduardo Paes offered to provide US$47 million in funding to the Games to address these shortcomings, but a federal court blocked the further provision of public funding to the ROC pending the inspection of its financial records.

IPC president Philip Craven stated that "although the situation is pretty precarious, rumours that the Games may not go ahead or that sports may be cut are totally unfounded and not true. Our aim right now is to bring in additional funding and resources in order to deliver the Games at the service levels expected by all stakeholders, most importantly the athletes", and "if no more funding is available then the Organising Committee's additional cuts will start to impact on the services offered to the athletes who have dedicated years of their lives to reach and compete at these Games. This is the last thing that we want to do." On 19 August 2016, the IPC stated that the organising committee had made infrastructural reductions for the Games as a budgetary measure, including reducing the amount of transport services and the number of media centres, moving the wheelchair fencing events from Youth Arena to Carioca Arena 3, as well as closing and dismantling Deodoro Olympic Park so that the remaining venues in the cluster can act as "three standalone venues with dedicated transport hubs." Some public parties and gatherings related to the Games were also cancelled.

Of these changes, Craven stated that "it's in our Paralympic DNA to see obstacles as an opportunity to do things differently and that's what we are doing here. We are problem solvers by nature and fight for what we believe in", and iterated that he was "fully confident Rio 2016 will be the best Games ever in terms of athletic performance." Craven explained that "We want full participation here. We want all eligible countries to send their athletes to the Games. It's what the athletes deserve, and it is what the athletes want after years of training and dedication." The injunction was lifted on 18 August 2016, resulting in Paes offering R$150 million in public money to fund the Games. R$100 million worth of sponsorship deals were also reached with the federal government via state-run enterprises. The funding was eventually delivered, ensuring that all 165 delegations would be able to attend the Games.

=== Death of Bahman Golbarnezhad ===
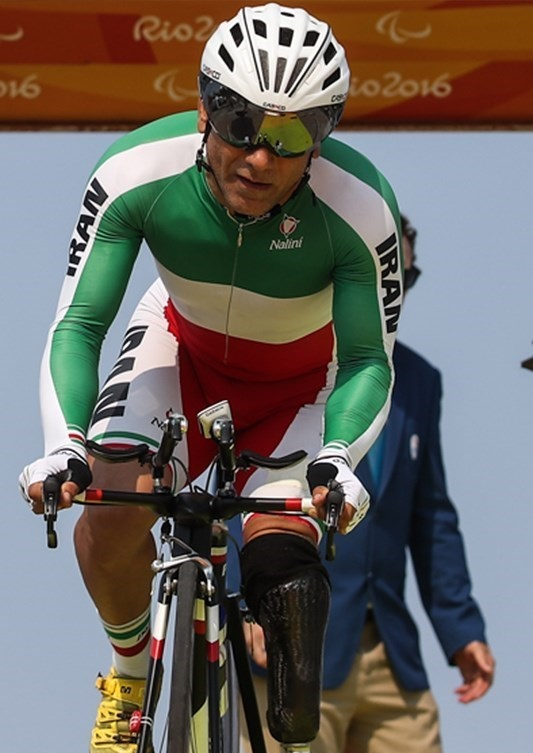
Bahman Golbarnezhad, hours before death

On 17 September 2016, during the men's C4-5 road cycling event, Iranian cyclist Bahman Golbarnezhad crashed on a "mountainous stretch" of the circuit in Grumari; after being treated on site for head injuries, he experienced cardiac arrest during ambulance transport. Golbarnejhad died at Unimed Rio hospital after another cardiac arrest. This marked the first instance of a death in Paralympic competition, and the first death in an Olympic or Paralympic competition since that of Danish cyclist Knud Enemark Jensen at a time trial in the 1960 Summer Olympics.

The Union Cycliste Internationale (UCI) announced that it would investigate the incident, and the I. R. Iran National Paralympic Committee requested a report on the incident from the IPC. IPC president Philip Craven expressed condolences for Golbarnezhad, stating that "the Paralympic Family is united in grief at this horrendous tragedy which casts a shadow over what have been great Paralympic Games here in Rio."

The Iranian and Paralympic flags in the athletes' village were flown at half-mast, as well as the Paralympic flag at Riocentro. A moment of silence was observed during the closing ceremony.

== See also ==
- 2015 Parapan American Games
- 2016 Summer Olympics
- Rising Phoenix, documentary about the Paralympic movement that covers the financial difficulties of the 2016 Paralympic Games

Preceded by London	Summer Paralympics; Rio de Janeiro; XV Paralympic Summer Games (2016)	Succeeded by Tokyo
