= Chile at the Paralympics =

- IPC code: CHI
- NPC: Chile Paralympic Committee
- Website: www.paralimpico.cl
- Medals: Gold 5 Silver 3 Bronze 6 Total 14

Summer appearances
- 1992; 1996; 2000; 2004; 2008; 2012; 2016; 2020; 2024

Winter appearances
- 2002; 2006; 2010; 2014; 2018; 2022; 2026

Chile has participated in the Paralympic Games since its debut at the 1992 Summer Paralympics in Barcelona, where it was represented by two athletes. The country has competed in every Summer Games since and made its first appearance in the Winter Paralympics in 2002. Chile won its first Paralympic gold medal at the 2012 London Games, when Cristian Valenzuela won the men's 5000 meters T11 event. In recent years, swimmer Alberto Abarza has also contributed to Chile’s medal tally, with a notable performance at the 2020 Tokyo Games. Chile has won a total of 13 Paralympic medals to date.

== Medals ==
=== Medals by Summer Games ===
Games	Athletes	Gold	Silver	Bronze	Total	Rank
(Italy) Rome 1960	did not participate					
(Japan) Tokyo 1964	did not participate					
(Israel) Tel Aviv 1968	did not participate					
(West Germany) Heidelberg 1972	did not participate					
(Canada) Toronto 1976	did not participate					
(Netherlands) Arnhem 1980	did not participate					
(United States) New York 1984/ (United Kingdom) Stoke Mandeville 1984	did not participate					
(South Korea) Seoul 1988	did not participate					
(Spain) Barcelona 1992	2	1	0	0	1	45
(United States) Atlanta 1996	2	0	0	0	0	−
(Australia) Sydney 2000	4	0	0	0	0	−
(Greece) Athens 2004	4	0	0	0	0	−
(China) Beijing 2008	4	0	0	0	0	−
(United Kingdom) London 2012	7	1	0	0	1	52
(Brazil) Rio de Janeiro 2016	15	0	0	0	0	−
(Japan) Tokyo 2020	19	2	3	1	6	45
(France) Paris 2024	28	1	0	5	6	60
(United States) Los Angeles 2028	upcoming events					
(Australia) Brisbane 2032	upcoming events					
Total		5	3	6	14	76

=== Medals by Winter Games ===
Games	Athletes	Gold	Silver	Bronze	Total	Rank
(Sweden) Örnsköldsvik 1976	did not participate					
(Norway) Geilo 1980	did not participate					
(Austria) Innsbruck 1984	did not participate					
(Austria) Innsbruck 1988	did not participate					
(France) Albertville 1992	did not participate					
(Norway) Lillehammer 1994	did not participate					
(Japan) Nagano 1998	did not participate					
(United States) Salt Lake City 2002	2	0	0	0	0	−
(Italy) Turin 2006	2	0	0	0	0	−
(Canada) Vancouver 2010	2	0	0	0	0	−
(Russia) Sochi 2014	2	0	0	0	0	−
(South Korea) Pyeongchang 2018	4	0	0	0	0	−
(China) Beijing 2022	4	0	0	0	0	−
(Italy) Milan-Cortina 2026	upcoming events					
(France) French Alps 2032	upcoming events					
(United States) Salt Lake City 2034	upcoming events					
Total		0	0	0	0	−

=== Medals by Summer Sport ===
Sports	Gold	Silver	Bronze	Total	Rank
Athletics	2	0	0	2	76
Swimming	1	2	3	6	54
Paracanoe	1	0	1	2	7
Archery	0	1	0	1	36
Powerlifting	0	0	1	1	n/a
Table tennis	0	0	1	1	n/a
Total	4	3	6	13	81

=== Medals by Winter Sport ===
Games	Gold	Silver	Bronze	Total
Total	0	0	0	0

=== Medals by gender ===
Gender	Gold	Silver	Bronze	Total
Men	2	2	3	7
Women	2	1	3	6
Mixed	0	0	0	0
Total	4	3	6	13

== Medalists ==
A total of seven athletes have won 13 Paralympic medals for Chile. Alberto Abarza and Katherinne Wollermann have won multiple medals.

Medal	Name	Games	Sport	Event
Gold	Cristian Valenzuela	(United Kingdom) 2012 London	Athletics	Men's 5000m T11
Gold	Francisca Mardones	(Japan) 2020 Tokyo	Athletics	Women's shot put F54
Gold	Alberto Abarza	(Japan) 2020 Tokyo	Swimming	Men's 100 m backstroke S2
Silver	Alberto Abarza	(Japan) 2020 Tokyo	Swimming	Men's 50 m backstroke S2
Silver	Alberto Abarza	(Japan) 2020 Tokyo	Swimming	Men's 200 m freestyle S2
Silver	Mariana Zúñiga	(Japan) 2020 Tokyo	Archery	Women's individual compound open
Bronze	Katherinne Wollermann	(Japan) 2020 Tokyo	Paracanoeing	Women's KL1
Gold	Katherinne Wollermann	(France) 2024 Paris	Paracanoeing	Women's KL1
Bronze	Alberto Abarza	(France) 2024 Paris	Swimming	Men's 100 m backstroke S2
Bronze	Alberto Abarza	(France) 2024 Paris	Swimming	Men's 50 m backstroke S2
Bronze	Alberto Abarza	(France) 2024 Paris	Swimming	Men's 200 m freestyle S2
Bronze	Florencia Pérez	(France) 2024 Paris	Table tennis	Women's singles C8
Bronze	Marion Serrano	(France) 2024 Paris	Powerlifting	Women's -86 kg

Best non-medaling results:

Rank	Sport	Athlete	Event	Games
Summer
4th	Swimming	Gabriel Vallejos	Men's 50 m backstroke S3	(Spain) 1992 Barcelona
4th	Swimming	Gabriel Vallejos	Men's 50 m butterfly S3	(United States) 1996 Atlanta
4th	Athletics	Amanda Cerna	Women's 400 metres T47	(Brazil) 2016 Rio de Janeiro
4th	Powerlifting	María Antonieta Ortiz	Women's -67 kg	(Brazil) 2016 Rio de Janeiro
4th	Powerlifting	Juan Carlos Garrido	Men's -59 kg	(Japan) 2020 Tokyo
4th	Powerlifting	Camila Campos	Women's -55 kg	(Japan) 2020 Tokyo
4th	Powerlifting	Camila Campos	Women's -50 kg	(France) 2024 Paris
Winter
9th	Alpine skiing	Nicolás Bisquertt	Men's sitting slalom	(South Korea) 2018 PyeongChang
9th	Alpine skiing	Nicolás Bisquertt	Men's sitting super combined	(China) 2022 Beijing

== See also ==
- Chile at the Olympics
