= Archery at the 2020 Summer Paralympics – Team compound open =

Mixed team compound open at the XVI Paralympic Games
- Paralympic Archery
- Venue: Tokyo
- Dates: 27-29 August 2021
- Competitors: 22 from 11 nations

Medalists
1st place, gold medalist(s)		Lin Yueshan; He Zihao	China
2nd place, silver medalist(s)		Öznur Cüre; Bülent Korkmaz	Turkey
3rd place, bronze medalist(s)		Stepanida Artakhinova; Bair Shigaev	RPC

The Mixed team compound open is one of three team events held in the 2020 Summer Paralympics in Tokyo, Japan. It contains eleven teams of one man and one woman, the ranking round having been held on 27 August and the knockout stage on 29 August.

Following the ranking round, teams ranked 1st to 5th will immediately go to the quarterfinals while the 6th to 11th teams will have to begin at the 1/8 eliminations. Following the quarterfinals would be the semifinals which then the winners would go to the finals to compete for gold and losers go to the third-place match to compete for bronze.

== Team compound Open ==
=== Ranking Round ===
The points are calculated by combining the score, Xs, and 10s of the two archers, in their team, from their individual ranking round events.

Rank	Nation	Gender	Archer	10s	Xs	Combined Score	Notes
1	China	F	Lin Yueshan	98	52	1388	PR
1	China	M	He Zihao	98	52	1388	PR
2	RPC	F	Stepanida Artakhinova	94	38	1386	
2	RPC	M	Bair Shigaev	94	38	1386	
3	Turkey	F	Öznur Cüre	89	32	1378	
3	Turkey	M	Bülent Korkmaz	89	32	1378	
4	Iran	F	Farzaneh Asgari	93	33	1376	
4	Iran	M	Ramezan Biabani	93	33	1376	
5	Great Britain	F	Jessica Stretton	87	42	1376	
5	Great Britain	M	John Stubbs	87	42	1376	
6	India	F	Jyoti Baliyan	83	28	1370	
6	India	M	Rakesh Kumar	83	28	1370	
7	Italy	F	Maria Andrea Virgilio	83	33	1369	
7	Italy	M	Matteo Bonacina	83	33	1369	
8	France	F	Julie Chupin	72	25	1362	
8	France	M	Daniel Lelou	72	25	1362	
9	Brazil	F	Jane Karla Gögel	71	30	1357	
9	Brazil	M	Andrey de Castro	71	30	1357	
10	Japan	F	Miho Nagano	65	24	1330	
10	Japan	M	Leon Miyamoto	65	24	1330	
11	Thailand	F	Praphaporn Homjanthuek	66	16	1329	
11	Thailand	M	Anon Aungaphinan	66	16	1329	

=== Competition bracket ===
1/8 eliminations
9	Jane Karla Gögel (BRA); Andrey de Castro (BRA)	142
8	Julie Chupin (FRA); Daniel Lelou (FRA)	145
6	Jyoti Baliyan (IND); Rakesh Kumar (IND)	147
11	Praphaporn Homjanthuek (THA); Anon Aungaphinan (THA)	141
7	Maria Andrea Virgilio (ITA); Matteo Bonacina (ITA)	145
10	Miho Nagano (JPN); Leon Miyamoto (JPN)	144

Quarter-finals
1	Lin Yueshan (CHN); He Zihao (CHN)	154
8	Julie Chupin (FRA); Daniel Lelou (FRA)	151
5	Jessica Stretton (GBR); John Stubbs (GBR)	151
4	Farzaneh Asgari (IRI); Ramezan Biabani (IRI)	153
3	Öznur Cüre (TUR); Bülent Korkmaz (TUR)	153
6	Jyoti Baliyan (IND); Rakesh Kumar (IND)	151
7	Maria Andrea Virgilio (ITA); Matteo Bonacina (ITA)	153
2	Stepanida Artakhinova (RPC); Bair Shigaev (RPC)	153

Semi-finals
1	Lin Yueshan (CHN); He Zihao (CHN)	150
4	Farzaneh Asgari (IRI); Ramezan Biabani (IRI)	146
3	Öznur Cüre (TUR); Bülent Korkmaz (TUR)	156
2	Stepanida Artakhinova (RPC); Bair Shigaev (RPC)	155

Finals
1	Lin Yueshan (CHN); He Zihao (CHN)	153
3	Öznur Cüre (TUR); Bülent Korkmaz (TUR)	152
Third place match
4	Farzaneh Asgari (IRI); Ramezan Biabani (IRI)	151
2	Stepanida Artakhinova (RPC); Bair Shigaev (RPC)	153
