= Chile at the 2024 Summer Paralympics =

- Flag of Chile
- IPC code: CHI
- NPC: Chilean Paralympic Committee
- Website: www.paralimpico.cl

in Paris, France August 28, 2024 – September 8, 2024
- Competitors: 28 (17 men and 11 women) in 11 sports
- Flag bearers: Camila Campos; Francisco Cayulef
- Medals Ranked 60th: Gold 1 Silver 0 Bronze 5 Total 6

Summer Paralympics appearances (overview)
- 1992; 1996; 2000; 2004; 2008; 2012; 2016; 2020; 2024

Chile competed at the 2024 Summer Paralympics in Paris, France, from 28 August to 8 September.

== Medalists ==
The following Chilean competitors won medals at the games. In the discipline sections below, the medalists' names are bolded.

Medal	Name	Sport	Event	Date
Gold	Katherinne Wollermann	Paracanoeing	Women's KL1	8 September
Bronze	Alberto Abarza	Swimming	Men's 100 m backstroke S2	29 August
Bronze	Alberto Abarza	Swimming	Men's 50 m backstroke S2	31 August
Bronze	Alberto Abarza	Swimming	Men's 200 m freestyle S2	2 September
Bronze	Florencia Pérez	Table tennis	Women's singles C8	6 September
Bronze	Marion Serrano	Powerlifting	Women's -86 kg	8 September

Medals by sport
Sport	1st place, gold medalist(s)	2nd place, silver medalist(s)	3rd place, bronze medalist(s)	Total
Paracanoeing	1	0	0	**1**
Swimming	0	0	3	**3**
Powerlifting	0	0	1	**1**
Table tennis	0	0	1	**1**
Total	1	0	5	6

Medals by day
Day	Date	1st place, gold medalist(s)	2nd place, silver medalist(s)	3rd place, bronze medalist(s)	Total
1	29 August	0	0	1	**1**
3	31 August	0	0	1	**1**
5	2 September	0	0	1	**1**
9	6 September	0	0	1	**1**
11	8 September	1	0	1	**2**
Total		1	0	5	6

Medals by gender
Gender	1st place, gold medalist(s)	2nd place, silver medalist(s)	3rd place, bronze medalist(s)	Total	Percentage
Female	1	0	2	**3**	50.0%
Male	0	0	3	**3**	50.0%
Mixed	0	0	0	**0**	0.0%
Total	1	0	5	6	100%

Multiple medalists
Name	Sport	1st place, gold medalist(s)	2nd place, silver medalist(s)	3rd place, bronze medalist(s)	Total
Alberto Abarza	Swimming	0	0	3	**3**

== Competitors ==
The following is the list of number of competitors in the Games.

Sport	Men	Women	Total
Archery	0	1	1
Athletics	1	2	3
Badminton	1	0	1
Cycling	1	0	1
Judo	1	0	1
Paracanoeing	0	1	1
Powerlifting	2	2	4
Swimming	2	1	3
Table tennis	5	2	7
Taekwondo	0	1	1
Wheelchair tennis	4	1	5
Total	17	11	28

== Archery ==
Chile secured one quota at the 2023 Parapan American Games after finishing in the top two places in the open class disciplines.

Athlete	Event	Ranking Round		Round of 32	Round of 16	Quarterfinals	Semifinals	Finals	
Athlete	Event	Score	Seed	Opposition Score	Opposition Score	Opposition Score	Opposition Score	Opposition Score	Rank
Mariana Zúñiga	Women's individual compound open	670	15	Choi (KOR); W 139–135	Devi (IND); W 138–137	Paterson Pine (GBR); L 138–143	Did not advance		8

== Athletics ==
Chile entered three track and field athletes for the Paralympic games. Francisca Mardones qualified for the games by finishing in the top four places at the 2023 World Championships in her respective Paralympic class discipline; meanwhile Amanda Cerna and Mauricio Orrego qualified through high performance allocation.

Key

- Note–Ranks given for track events are within the athlete's heat only
- Q = Qualified for the next round
- q = Qualified for the next round as a fastest loser or, in field events, by position without achieving the qualifying target
- PR = Paralympic Record
- AR = Area (or continental) Record
- NR = National Record
- SB = Season's Best
- N/A = Round not applicable for the event

Track events

Athlete	Event	Heat		Final	
Athlete	Event	Time	Rank	Time	Rank
Mauricio Orrego	Men's 1500 m T46	N/A		4:06.03	11
Amanda Cerna	Women's 200 m T47	27.61 SB	6	Did not advance	
Amanda Cerna	Women's 400 m T47	1:02.19	6	Did not advance	

Field events

Athlete	Event	Final	
Athlete	Event	Distance	Rank
Francisca Mardones	Women's shot put F54	7.59 SB	4

== Badminton ==
For the first time ever, Chile sent one male para-badminton player after Jaime Aránguiz received the bipartite commission invitation.

Athlete	Event	Group Stage			Semifinals	Final / BM	
Athlete	Event	Opposition Result	Opposition Result	Rank	Opposition Result	Opposition Result	Rank
Jaime Aránguiz	Men's singles WH2	Chan (HKG); L 10–21, 8–21	Bin Noorlan (MAL); W 21–15, 21–13	2	Did not advance		=5

== Cycling ==
For the first time ever, Chile sent one male para-cyclist after finishing among the top eligible nations at the 2022 UCI Nations ranking allocation ranking.

Road

Athlete	Event	Time	Rank
Hernán Moya	Men's road race C4–5	2:39:13	16
Hernán Moya	Men's time trial C5	42:37.64	12

Track

Athlete	Event	Qualification		Final / BM	
Athlete	Event	Time	Rank	Opposition Time	Rank
Hernán Moya	Men's time trial C4–5	1:08.476	17	Did not advance	
Hernán Moya	Men's pursuit C5	4:50.769	13	Did not advance	

== Judo ==
Chile entered one athlete to compete at the Paralympics games. Johann Herrera qualified for the games after receiving the bipartite commission invitation; also marking the nation's debut in this sport.

Athlete	Event	Round of 16	Quarterfinals	Semifinals	Repechage	Final / BM	
Athlete	Event	Opposition Result	Opposition Result	Opposition Result	Opposition Result	Opposition Result	Rank
Johann Herrera	Men's −60 kg J2	Bye	Zurabiani (GEO); L 00S2–01S1	Did not advance	Khorava (UKR); L 00–10	Did not advance	=7

== Paracanoeing ==
Chile secured one quota at the 2023 ICF Canoe Sprint World Championships after finishing in the top six places in Paralympic class disciplines.

Key

- Note–Ranks given for are within the athlete's heat only
- Qualification Legend: FA =Qualify to final (medal); SF =Qualify to semifinal

Athlete	Event	Heats		Semifinal		Final	
Athlete	Event	Time	Rank	Time	Rank	Time	Rank
Katherinne Wollermann	Women's KL1	55.88	1 FA	Bye		51.95	1st place, gold medalist(s)

== Powerlifting ==
Chile has qualified four powerlifters for the games after each lifter finished in the top eight ranked places in their respective bodyweight category.

Athlete	Event	Attempts (kg)				Result (kg)	Rank
Athlete	Event	1	2	3	4	Result (kg)	Rank
Juan Carlos Garrido	Men's -59 kg	180	184	~~187~~	—N/a	184	5
Jorge Carinao	Men's -65 kg	~~193~~	~~193~~	193	—N/a	193	8
Camila Campos	Women's -50 kg	111	113	~~117~~	—N/a	113	4
Marion Serrano	Women's -86 kg	129	134	~~141~~	—N/a	134	3rd place, bronze medalist(s)

== Swimming ==
Chile secured two quotas at the 2023 World Para Swimming Championships after finishing in the top two places in Paralympic class disciplines. Kiara Godoy qualified for the games through the bipartite commission invitation.

Athlete	Event	Heats		Final	
Athlete	Event	Time	Rank	Time	Rank
Alberto Abarza	Men's 200 m freestyle S2	4:14.71	3 Q	4:22.18	3rd place, bronze medalist(s)
Alberto Abarza	Men's 50 m backstroke S2	59.99	3 Q	58.12	3rd place, bronze medalist(s)
Alberto Abarza	Men's 100 m backstroke S2	2:01.74	2 Q	2:01.97	3rd place, bronze medalist(s)
Vicente Almonacid	Men's 100 m breaststroke SB8	1:12.60	7 Q	DSQ	
Kiara Godoy	Women's 100 m butterfly S9	1:18.80	10	Did not advance	

== Table tennis ==
Chile entered seven athletes for the Paralympic games. Four of them qualified for Paris 2024 by virtue of their gold medal results, in their respective class, through the 2023 Parapan American Games in Santiago, Chile. Ignacio Torres qualified for the games through the allocation of ITTF final world ranking; meanwhile Matías Pino qualified by winning the ITTF World Qualification Tournament in Pattaya, Thailand. Manuel Echaveguren qualified for the games through the bipartite commission invitation from the ITTF and the IPC.

Athlete	Event	Round of 32	Round of 16	Quarterfinals	Semifinals	Final	
Athlete	Event	Opposition Result	Opposition Result	Opposition Result	Opposition Result	Opposition Result	Rank
Luis Flores	Men's singles C2	Bye	Sastre (ESP); W 3–1	Cha (KOR); L 0–3	Did not advance		=5
Maximiliano Rodríguez	Men's singles C4	—N/a	Turan (TUR); L 1–3	Did not advance			=9
Matías Pino	Men's singles C6	—N/a	Thainiyom (THA); L 0–3	Did not advance			=9
Ignacio Torres	Men's singles C6	—N/a	Herrault (FRA); W 3–2	Parenzan (ITA); L 0–3	Did not advance		=5
Manuel Echaveguren	Men's singles C10	—N/a	Ruiz (ESP); W 3–1	Radović (MNE); L 0–3	Did not advance		=5
Luis Flores; Maximiliano Rodríguez	Men's doubles MD8	—N/a	Kim / Kim (KOR); L 0–3	Did not advance			=9
Matías Pino; Ignacio Torres	Men's doubles MD14	—N/a	Morales / Valera (ESP); W 3–0	Liao / Yan (CHN); L 0–3	Did not advance		=5
Tamara Leonelli	Women's singles C5	—N/a	Alabi (NGR); W 3–1	Pan (CHN); L 0–3	Did not advance		=5
Florencia Pérez	Women's singles C8	—N/a	Bye	Kamkasomphou (FRA); W 3–0	Huang (CHN); L 0–3	Did not advance	3rd place, bronze medalist(s)
Luis Flores; Tamara Leonelli	Mixed doubles XD7	Addis / Sands (AUS); W 3–0	Merrien / Vautier (FRA); L 0–3	Did not advance			=9
Ignacio Torres; Florencia Pérez	Mixed doubles XD17	Didier / Kamkasomphou (FRA); L 0–3	Did not advance				=17

== Taekwondo ==
Chile entered one athlete to compete at the Paralympics competition. Constanza Fuentes qualified for the games in women's under 65 kg events, by virtue of winning the gold medal in her class at the 2024 Pan American Qualification Tournament in Santo Domingo, Dominican Republic; also marking the nation's debut in this sport.

Athlete	Event	First round	Quarterfinals	Semifinals	Repechage	Final / BM	
Athlete	Event	Opposition Result	Opposition Result	Opposition Result	Opposition Result	Opposition Result	Rank
Constanza Fuentes	Women's −65 kg	Yao (CHN); L 0–30	Did not advance				=9

== Wheelchair tennis ==
Chile entered four athletes for the Paralympic games due to the singles world ranking allocation; meanwhile Brayan Tapia qualified for the games through the bipartite commission invitation from the ITF and the IPC.

Athlete	Event	Round of 64	Round of 32	Round of 16	Quarterfinals	Semifinals	Final / BM	
Athlete	Event	Opposition Result	Opposition Result	Opposition Result	Opposition Result	Opposition Result	Opposition Result	Rank
Alexander Cataldo	Men's singles	Bye	Berdichevsky (ISR); W 6–1, 3–6, 6–3	Fernández (ARG); L 0–6, 1–6	Did not advance			=9
Brayan Tapia	Men's singles	Lysov (ISR); L 5–7, 1–6	Did not advance					=33
Alexander Cataldo; Brayan Tapia	Men's doubles	—N/a	Bye	Hewett / Reid (GBR); L 1–6, 3–6	Did not advance			=9
Macarena Cabrillana	Women's singles	—N/a	Rodríguez (COL); W 6–3, 6–1	Zhu (CHN); L 0–6, 4–6	Did not advance			=9
Francisco Cayulef	Quad singles	—N/a		Sasson (ISR); L 2–6, 3–6	Did not advance			=9
Diego Pérez	Quad singles	—N/a		Lapthorne (GBR); L 4–6, 3–6	Did not advance			=9
Francisco Cayulef; Diego Pérez	Quad doubles	—N/a			Ramphadi / Sithole (RSA); L 4–6, 7–6^{(1)}, [6–10]	Did not advance		=5

== See also ==
- Chile at the 2023 Parapan American Games
- Chile at the 2024 Summer Olympics
- Chile at the Paralympics
