= Peter Marchant (archer) =

Australian Paralympic archer

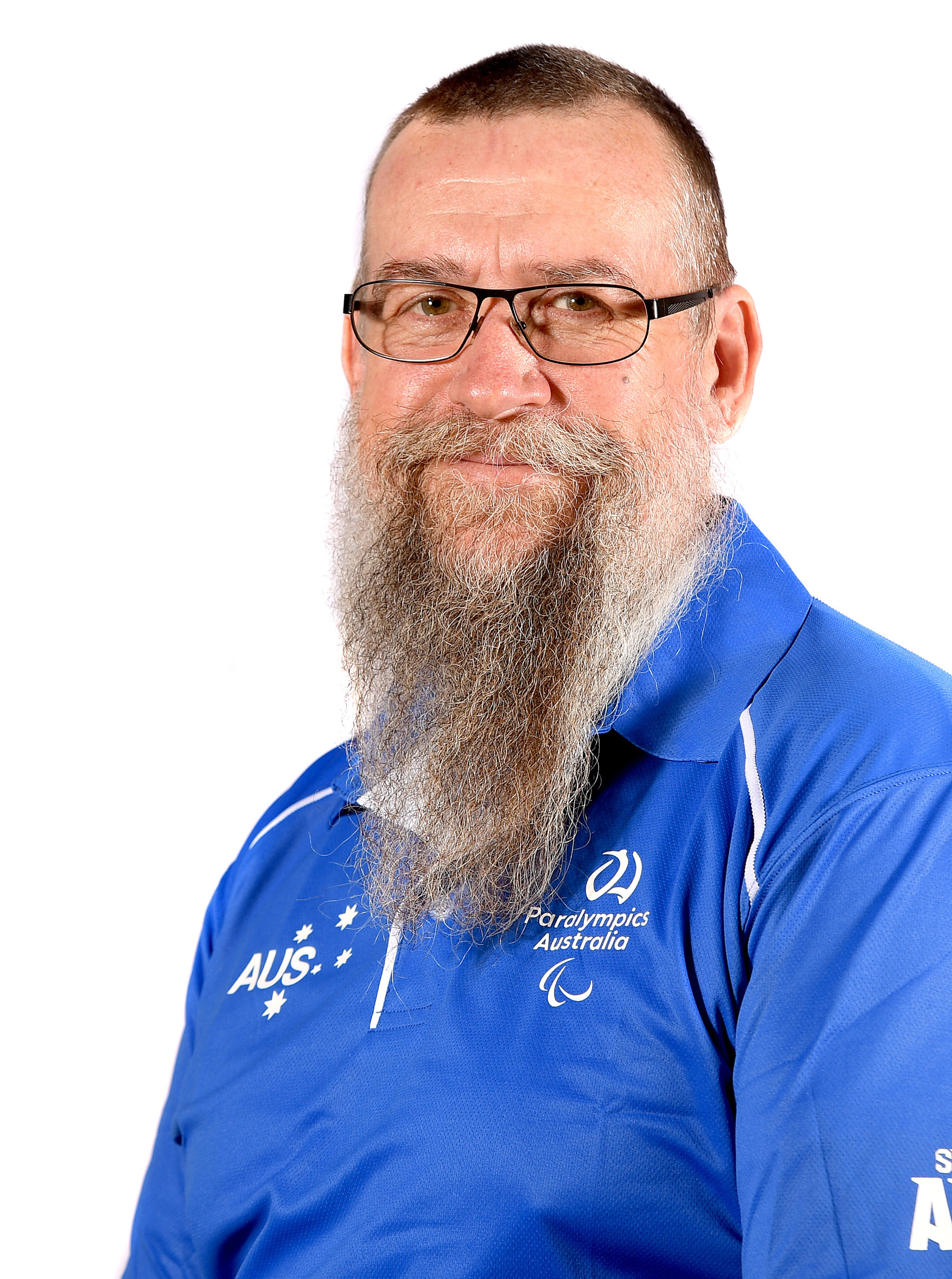
- Marchant in 2019

Personal information
- Nationality: Australian
- Born: 11 June 1961 (age 65)

Sport
- Sport: Archery
- Disability class: W2
- Coached by: Ricci Cheah

Peter Marchant (born 11 June 1961) is an Australian Paralympic archer. He represented Australia at the 2020 Summer Paralympics.

== Personal ==
Marchant was born on 11 June 1961. In 1986, whilst riding his motor bike to work, a truck travelling in front of him turned unexpectedly and he was thrown from his bike. He ended up injuring his spinal cord. In 2021, he lives in Wallarah, New South Wales.

== Archery ==
In 2015, Marchant took up para archery. He is classified as a W2 archer. Marchant made his international debut at the 2017 World Archery Para Championships in Beijing, China. In 2018, he won a silver medal at the 2018 Para-archery European Circuit in Olbia, Italy. At the 2019 World Archery Para Championships in s-Hertogenbosch, Netherlands, Marchant joined forces with Paralympic bronze medallist Jonathon Milne and Craig McMurdo to reach the quarter-finals in the Men's Team Compound Open and were ranked sixth. At this event, he finished 37th in the Men's Open Compound.

At the 2020 Tokyo Paralympics, Marchant lost in the Round of 16 to Ramezan Biabani of Iran in the Men's individual compound open after qualifying 31st.
