= Archery at the 2020 Summer Paralympics – Men's individual compound open =

Archery, Men's compound open at the XVI Paralympic Games
- Venue: Yumenoshima Park Archery Field
- Dates: 27–31 August 2021
- Competitors: 36 from 28 nations

Medalists
1st place, gold medalist(s)		He Zihao	China
2nd place, silver medalist(s)		Ramezan Biabani	Iran
3rd place, bronze medalist(s)		Ai Xinliang	China

The men's individual compound open archery discipline at the 2020 Summer Paralympics will be contested from 27 to 31 August.

In the ranking rounds each archer shoots 72 arrows, and is seeded according to score. In the knock-out stages, each archer shoots three arrows per set against an opponent, the scores being aggregated. Losing semifinalists compete in a bronze medal match. As the field contained 36 archers, the eight lowest ranked archers in the ranking round, will play a preliminary match to decide the last of the round 32 places.

== Ranking round ==
The ranking round of the men's individual compound open event was held on 27 August, 2021.

Rank	Archer	Nation	10s	Xs	Score	Notes
1	He Zihao	China	57	33	705	PR
2	Ramezan Biabani	Iran	53	18	699	PB
3	Rakesh Kumar	India	53	17	699	PB
4	Alisina Manshaezadeh	Iran	52	16	699	PB
5	Marcel Pavlík	Slovakia	50	24	696	SB
6	Ai Xinliang	China	49	24	695	
7	Bair Shigaev	RPC	48	18	693	
8	Jonathon Milne	Australia	47	22	692	
9	Serhiy Atamanenko	Ukraine	46	22	689	
10	Bülent Korkmaz	Turkey	46	16	689	SB
11	Nail Gatin	RPC	45	14	689	PB
12	Matt Stutzman	United States	45	21	688	
13	Kevin Polish	United States	44	14	687	
14	Marián Marečák	Slovakia	44	14	686	SB
15	Anon Aungaphinan	Thailand	41	9	686	PB
16	Matteo Bonacina	Italy	42	13	685	
17	Leon Miyamoto	Japan	40	15	683	
18	Piotr Van Montagu	Belgium	39	21	683	PB
19	John Stubbs	Great Britain	39	17	682	
20	Jere Forsberg	Finland	39	10	682	SB
21	Shyam Sundar Swami	India	38	15	682	SB
22	Nathan MacQueen	Great Britain	42	20	680	
23	Daniel Lelou	France	35	14	680	PB
24	Murat Turan	Turkey	35	12	675	SB
25	Andre Shelby	United States	32	11	675	SB
26	Wiro Julin	Malaysia	36	12	673	SB
27	Comsan Singpirom	Thailand	31	6	671	
28	Giampaolo Cancelli	Italy	34	9	669	
29	Andrey de Castro	Brazil	28	14	669	SB
30	Ngai Ka Chuen	Hong Kong	37	13	667	
31	Peter Marchant	Australia	29	13	664	
32	Diego Quesada	Costa Rica	25	9	661	SB
33	Omar Echeverría	Mexico	27	12	659	
34	Éric Pereira	France	26	7	655	
35	Sulaiman Sulaiman	Iraq	26	13	650	
36	Philip Coates-Palgrave	South Africa	24	8	646	

== Elimination rounds ==
The elimination round takes place between 28 and 31 August 2021.

=== Section 1 ===
Round of 64
33	Echeverría (MEX)	131
32	Quesada (CRC)	139

Round of 32
1	He (CHN)	143
32	Quesada (CRC)	140
17	Miyamoto (JPN)	141
16	Bonacina (ITA)	136
9	Atamanenko (UKR)	139
24	Turan (TUR)	139
25	Shelby (USA)	143
8	Milne (AUS)	141

Round of 16
1	He (CHN)	146
17	Miyamoto (JPN)	139
24	Turan (TUR)	142
25	Shelby (USA)	138

Quarterfinals
1	He (CHN)	148 PR
24	Turan (TUR)	145

=== Section 2 ===
Round of 64
29	Castro (BRA)	135
36	Coates-Palgrave (RSA)	142

Round of 32
5	Pavlík (SVK)	142
28	Cancelli (ITA)	139
21	Swami (IND)	139
12	Stutzman (USA)	142
13	Polish (USA)	143
20	Forsberg (FIN)	145
36	Coates-Palgrave (RSA)	130
4	Manshaezadeh (IRI)	143

Round of 16
5	Pavlík (SVK)	143
12	Stutzman (USA)	137
20	Forsberg (FIN)	145
4	Manshaezadeh (IRI)	143

Quarterfinals
5	Pavlík (SVK)	144
20	Forsberg (FIN)	141

=== Section 3 ===
Round of 64
35	Sulaiman (IRQ)	138
30	Ngai (HKG)	140

Round of 32
3	R Kumar (IND)	144
30	Ngai (HKG)	131
19	Stubbs (GBR)	138
14	Marecak (SVK)	138
11	Gatin (RPC)	142
22	MacQueen (GBR)	138
27	Singpirom (THA)	140
6	Ai (CHN)	142

Round of 16
3	R Kumar (IND)	140
14	Marecak (SVK)	137
11	Gatin (RPC)	145
6	Ai (CHN)	146

Quarterfinals
3	R Kumar (IND)	143
6	Ai (CHN)	145

=== Section 4 ===
Round of 64
31	Marchant (AUS)	138
34	Pereira (FRA)	136

Round of 32
7	Shigaev (RPC)	136
26	Julin (MAS)	126
23	Lelou (FRA)	137
10	Korkmaz (TUR)	141
15	Aungaphinan (THA)	135
18	Montagu (BEL)	143
31	Marchant (AUS)	139
2	Biabani (IRI)	141

Round of 16
7	Shigaev (RPC)	146
10	Korkmaz (TUR)	145
18	Montagu (BEL)	142
2	Biabani (IRI)	143

Quarterfinals
7	Shigaev (RPC)	143 ^{9}
2	Biabani (IRI)	143 ^{X}

=== Finals ===
Semi Finals
1	He (CHN)	148
5	Pavlík (SVK)	146
6	Ai (CHN)	144
2	Biabani (IRI)	146

Gold medal match
1	He (CHN)	147
2	Biabani (IRI)	143
Bronze medal match
5	Pavlík (SVK)	142
6	Ai (CHN)	144
