= Chile at the 2016 Summer Paralympics =

- IPC code: CHI
- NPC: Chile Paralympic Committee
- Website: www.paralimpico.cl

in Rio de Janeiro
- Competitors: 15 in 6 sports
- Medals: Gold 0 Silver 0 Bronze 0 Total 0

Summer Paralympics appearances (overview)
- 1992; 1996; 2000; 2004; 2008; 2012; 2016; 2020; 2024

Chile competed at the 2016 Summer Paralympics in Rio de Janeiro, Brazil, from 7 September to 18 September 2016.

== Disability classifications ==
Every participant at the Paralympics has their disability grouped into one of five disability categories; amputation, the condition may be congenital or sustained through injury or illness; cerebral palsy; wheelchair athletes, there is often overlap between this and other categories; visual impairment, including blindness; Les autres, any physical disability that does not fall strictly under one of the other categories, for example dwarfism or multiple sclerosis. Each Paralympic sport then has its own classifications, dependent upon the specific physical demands of competition. Events are given a code, made of numbers and letters, describing the type of event and classification of the athletes competing. Some sports, such as athletics, divide athletes by both the category and severity of their disabilities, other sports, for example swimming, group competitors from different categories together, the only separation being based on the severity of the disability.

== Competitors ==
The following is the list of number of competitors in the Games.

Sport	Men	Women	Total
Athletics	1	3	4
Paracanoeing	0	1	1
Powerlifting	2	1	3
Swimming	1	1	2
Table tennis	2	0	2
Wheelchair tennis	1	2	3
Total	7	8	15

== Athletics ==
Key

- Note–Ranks given for track events are within the athlete's heat only
- Q = Qualified for the next round
- q = Qualified for the next round as the fastest loser

Track events

Athlete	Event	Heat		Final	
Athlete	Event	Time	Rank	Time	Rank
Cristian Valenzuela	Men's 1500 m T11	DSQ		Did not advance	
Cristian Valenzuela	Men's 5000 m T11	—N/a		DNS	
Paula Guzmán	Women's 1500 m T11	5:37.26	6	Did not advance	
Margarita Faúndez	Women's 1500 m T13	5:01.93	3	Did not advance	
Amanda Cerna	Women's 200 m T47	28.17	5 q	28.19	8
Amanda Cerna	Women's 400 m T47	1:02.03	3 Q	1:01.48	4

== Paracanoeing ==
Key

- Note–Ranks given for are within the athlete's heat only
- Qualification Legend: F = Qualify to final; SF = Qualify to semifinal

Athlete	Event	Heats		Semifinal		Final	
Athlete	Event	Time	Rank	Time	Rank	Time	Rank
Katherinne Wollermann	Women's KL1	1:01.740	2 F	Bye		1:00.744	4

== Powerlifting ==
Athlete	Event	Result	Rank
Jorge Carinao	Men's -54 kg	150 kg	6
Juan Carlos Garrido	Men's -59 kg	NMR	
María Antonieta Ortiz	Women's -67 kg	98 kg	4

== Swimming ==
Athlete	Event	Heats		Final	
Athlete	Event	Time	Rank	Time	Rank
Alberto Abarza	Men's 50 m freestyle S3	58.17	9	Did not advance	
Alberto Abarza	Men's 50 m backstroke S3	56.73	7 Q	57.93	8
Valentina Muñoz	Women's 100 m backstroke S8	1:25.12	12	Did not advance	

== Table tennis ==
Athlete	Event	Group Stage			Round of 16	Quarterfinals	Semifinals	Final / BM	
Athlete	Event	Opposition Result	Opposition Result	Rank	Opposition Result	Opposition Result	Opposition Result	Opposition Result	Rank
Cristián Dettoni	Men's singles C6	Valera (ESP); L 0-3	Simion (ROU); L 2-3	3	Did not advance				
Matías Pino	Men's singles C6	Park (KOR); L 2-3	Karabardak (GBR); W 3-2	2 Q	Wetherill (GBR); L 1-3	Did not advance			
Cristián Dettoni; Matías Pino	Men's team C6-8	—N/a			Slovakia (SVK); L 0–2	Did not advance			

== Wheelchair tennis ==
Chile qualified one competitors in the men's single event, Robinson Mendez. This spot was a result of a Bipartite Commission Invitation place. Chile qualified two competitors in the women's singles event. Francisca Mardones earned her spot via the standard qualification process. Macarena Cabrillana earned her spot via a Bipartite Commission Invitation place.

Athlete	Event	Round of 64	Round of 32	Round of 16	Quarterfinals	Semifinals	Final / BM	
Athlete	Event	Opposition Result	Opposition Result	Opposition Result	Opposition Result	Opposition Result	Opposition Result	Rank
Robinson Méndez	Men's singles	Rodrigues (BRA); L 0–6, 4–6	Did not advance					
Macarena Cabrillana	Women's singles	—N/a	Lu (TPE); W 6–4, 6–3	Kamiji (JPN); L 1–6, 1–6	Did not advance			
Francisca Mardones	Women's singles	—N/a	Shuker (GBR); L 2–6, 0–6	Did not advance				
Macarena Cabrillana; Francisca Mardones	Women's doubles	—N/a			Shuker / Whiley (GBR); L 0–6, 0–6	Did not advance		

== See also ==
- Chile at the 2016 Summer Olympics
