= Archery at the 2020 Summer Paralympics – Women's individual compound open =

Archery, Women's compound open at the XVI Paralympic Games
- Venue: Yumenoshima Park Archery Field
- Dates: 27–30 August 2021
- Competitors: 24 from 18 nations

Medalists
| 1st place, gold medalist(s) | | Phoebe Paterson Pine | Great Britain |
| 2nd place, silver medalist(s) | | Mariana Zúñiga | Chile |
| 3rd place, bronze medalist(s) | | Maria Andrea Virgilio | Italy |

The women's individual compound open archery discipline at the 2020 Summer Paralympics was held from 27 to 30 August.

In the ranking rounds each archer shoots 72 arrows, and is seeded according to score. In the knock-out stages each archer shoots three arrows per set against an opponent, the scores being aggregated. Losing semifinalists compete in a bronze medal match. As the field contained 24 archers, the sixteen lowest ranked archers in the ranking round, will play a preliminary match to decide the last of the round 16 places.

== Ranking round ==
The ranking round of the women's individual compound open event was held on 27 August.

| Rank | Archer | Nation | 10s | Xs | Score | Notes |
|---|---|---|---|---|---|---|
| 1 | Jessica Stretton | Great Britain | 48 | 25 | 694 | PR |
| 2 | Stepanida Artakhinova | RPC | 46 | 20 | 693 | SB |
| 3 | Öznur Cüre | Turkey | 43 | 16 | 689 | PB |
| 4 | Jane Karla Gögel | Brazil | 43 | 16 | 688 | |
| 5 | Maria Andrea Virgilio | Italy | 41 | 20 | 684 | PB |
| 6 | Lin Yueshan | China | 41 | 19 | 683 | |
| 7 | Nur Syahidah Alim | Singapore | 39 | 13 | 682 | |
| 8 | Julie Chupin | France | 37 | 11 | 682 | PB |
| 9 | Li Xinru | China | 42 | 15 | 681 | |
| 10 | Sevgi Yorulmaz | Turkey | 38 | 14 | 679 | SB |
| 11 | Karen Van Nest | Canada | 35 | 9 | 678 | SB |
| 12 | Farzaneh Asgari | Iran | 40 | 15 | 677 | PB |
| 13 | Eleonora Sarti | Italy | 34 | 14 | 672 | SB |
| 14 | Mariana Zúñiga | Chile | 32 | 13 | 671 | PB |
| 15 | Jyoti Baliyan | India | 30 | 11 | 671 | SB |
| 16 | Phoebe Paterson Pine | Great Britain | 28 | 7 | 670 | PB |
| 17 | Tatiana Andrievskaia | RPC | 28 | 10 | 667 | |
| 18 | Kerrie Leonard | Ireland | 24 | 4 | 657 | SB |
| 19 | Zhou Jiamin | China | 24 | 13 | 655 | |
| 20 | Choi Na-mi | South Korea | 25 | 6 | 652 | |
| 21 | María Carmen Rubio | Spain | 23 | 7 | 652 | SB |
| 22 | Miho Nagano | Japan | 25 | 9 | 647 | |
| 23 | Praphaporn Homjanthuek | Thailand | 25 | 7 | 643 | PB |
| 24 | Zandra Reppe | Sweden | 20 | 5 | 643 | |

== Elimination round ==
The elimination round took place from 29 to 30 August 2021.

=== Top half ===
Round of 32
17 | Andrievskaia (RPC) | 138
16 | Paterson Pine (GBR) | 142
9 | Li (CHN) | 138
24 | Reppe (SWE) | 134
21 | Rubio (ESP) | 134
12 | Asgari (IRI) | 140
13 | Sarti (ITA) | 140
20 | Choi (KOR) | 121

Round of 16
1 | Stretton (GBR) | 140
16 | Paterson Pine (GBR) | 141
9 | Li (CHN) | 138
8 | Chupin (FRA) | 145
5 | Virgilio (ITA) | 136
12 | Asgari (IRI) | 135
13 | Sarti (ITA) | 146 PR
4 | Gögel (BRA) | 140

Quarterfinals
16 | Paterson Pine (GBR) | 141
8 | Chupin (FRA) | 139
5 | Virgilio (ITA) | 138
13 | Sarti (ITA) | 121

Semifinals
16 | Paterson Pine (GBR) | 140
5 | Virgilio (ITA) | 137

=== Bottom half ===
Round of 32
19 | Zhou (CHN) | 137
14 | Zúñiga (CHI) | 144
11 | Van Nest (CAN) | 138
22 | Nagano (JPN) | 130
23 | Homjanthuek (THA) | 133
10 | Yorulmaz (TUR) | 133
15 | Baliyan (IND) | 137
18 | Leonard (IRL) | 141

Round of 16
3 | Cüre (TUR) | 140
14 | Zúñiga (CHI) | 143
11 | Van Nest (CAN) | 140
6 | Lin (CHN) | 142
7 | Alim (SGP) | 136
10 | Yorulmaz (TUR) | 140
18 | Leonard (IRL) | 131
2 | Artakhinova (RPC) | 141

Quarterfinals
14 | Zúñiga (CHI) | 138 ^{X+}
6 | Lin (CHN) | 138 ^{10}
10 | Yorulmaz (TUR) | 129
2 | Artakhinova (RPC) | 139

Semifinals
14 | Zúñiga (CHI) | 142
2 | Artakhinova (RPC) | 141

=== Finals ===
Gold medal match
16 | Paterson Pine (GBR) | 134
14 | Zúñiga (CHI) | 133
Bronze medal match
5 | Virgilio (ITA) | 142
2 | Artakhinova (RPC) | 139
