= Swimming at the 2020 Summer Paralympics – Men's 100 metre backstroke S2 =

Men's 100 metre backstroke S2 at the XVI Paralympic Games
- Venue: Tokyo Aquatics Centre
- Dates: 25 August 2021
- Competitors: 12 from 9 nations

Medalists
1st place, gold medalist(s)		Alberto Abarza	Chile
2nd place, silver medalist(s)		Gabriel Geraldo dos Santos Araujo	Brazil
3rd place, bronze medalist(s)		Vladimir Danilenko	RPC

The Men's 100 metre backstroke S2 event at the 2020 Paralympic Games took place on 25 August 2021, at the Tokyo Aquatics Centre.

== Heats ==
The swimmers with the top 8 times, regardless of heat, advanced to the final.

Rank	Heat	Lane	Name	Nationality	Time	Notes
1	2	5	Vladimir Danilenko	RPC	2:02.07	Q
2	1	4	Alberto Abarza	Chile	2:02.28	Q
3	1	5	Roman Bondarenko	Ukraine	2:08.72	Q
4	2	4	Gabriel dos Santos	Brazil	2:09.73	Q
5	2	3	Kamil Otowski	Poland	2:12.80	Q
6	1	3	Jacek Czech	Poland	2:14.25	Q
7	1	6	Aristeidis Makrodimitris	Greece	2:17.68	Q
8	2	7	Rodrigo Santillán	Peru	2:20.41	Q
9	2	2	Cristopher Tronco	Mexico	2:26.15	
10	1	2	Ievgen Panibratets	Ukraine	2:29.46	
11	1	7	Richard Mateo Vega	Colombia	2:38.70	
12	2	6	Nikita Kazachiner	RPC	DNS	

== Final ==
100m backstroke final
Rank	Lane	Name	Nationality	Time	Notes
1st place, gold medalist(s)	5	Alberto Abarza	Chile	2:00.40	
2nd place, silver medalist(s)	6	Gabriel dos Santos	Brazil	2:02.47	
3rd place, bronze medalist(s)	4	Vladimir Danilenko	RPC	2:02.74	
4	7	Jacek Czech	Poland	2:12.53	
5	1	Aristeidis Makrodimitris	Greece	2:14.54	
6	2	Kamil Otowski	Poland	2:15.09	
7	3	Roman Bondarenko	Ukraine	2:16.71	
8	8	Rodrigo Santillan	Peru	2:21.95	
