= Swimming at the 2020 Summer Paralympics – Men's 200 metre freestyle S2 =

Men's 200 metre freestyle S2 at the XVI Paralympic Games
- Venue: Tokyo Aquatics Centre
- Dates: 29 August 2021
- Competitors: 13 from 11 nations

Medalists
1st place, gold medalist(s)		Gabriel Araújo	Brazil
2nd place, silver medalist(s)		Alberto Abarza	Chile
3rd place, bronze medalist(s)		Vladimir Danilenko	RPC

The men's 200 metre freestyle S2 event at the 2020 Paralympic Games took place on 29 August 2021, at the Tokyo Aquatics Centre.

== Heats ==
The swimmers with the top eight times, regardless of heat, advanced to the final.

Rank	Heat	Lane	Name	Nationality	Time	Notes
1	2	5	Vladimir Danilenko	RPC	4:14.09	Q
2	1	4	Alberto Abarza	Chile	4:18.25	Q
3	2	4	Gabriel Araújo	Brazil	4:24.32	Q
4	1	5	Bruno Becker da Silva	Brazil	4:30.84	Q
5	1	3	Kamil Otowski	Poland	4:39.82	Q
6	1	6	Roman Bondarenko	Ukraine	4:45.36	Q
7	2	2	Aristeidis Makrodimitris	Greece	4:47.22	Q
8	1	2	Cristopher Tronco Sánchez	Mexico	5:01.68	Q
9	1	7	Richard Mateo Vega	Colombia	5:21.29	
10	2	7	Ievgen Panibratets	Ukraine	5:33.33	
11	2	1	Aliaksei Talai	Belarus	6:06.97	
	2	3	Jacek Czech	Poland	DNS	
	2	6	Nikita Kazachiner	RPC	DNS	

== Final ==
200m freestyle final
Rank	Lane	Name	Nationality	Time	Notes
1st place, gold medalist(s)	3	Gabriel Araújo	Brazil	4:06.52	AM
2nd place, silver medalist(s)	5	Alberto Abarza	Chile	4:14.17	
3rd place, bronze medalist(s)	4	Vladimir Danilenko	RPC	4:15.95	
4	6	Bruno Becker da Silva	Brazil	4:22.63	
5	2	Kamil Otowski	Poland	4:37.06	
6	7	Roman Bondarenko	Ukraine	4:38.40	
7	1	Aristeidis Makrodimitris	Greece	4:44.53	
8	8	Cristopher Tronco	Mexico	5:08.34	
