= Chile at the 2004 Summer Paralympics =

- IPC code: CHI
- NPC: Chile Paralympic Committee
- Website: www.paralimpico.cl

in Athens
- Competitors: 4 in 3 sports
- Flag bearer: Victor Solis
- Medals: Gold 0 Silver 0 Bronze 0 Total 0

Summer Paralympics appearances (overview)
- 1992; 1996; 2000; 2004; 2008; 2012; 2016; 2020; 2024

Chile competed at the 2004 Summer Paralympics in Athens, Greece. The team included four athletes, all of them men, and won no medals.

== Sports ==
=== Athletics ===
==== Men's track ====
Athlete	Class	Event	Heats		Semifinal		Final	
Athlete	Class	Event	Result	Rank	Result	Rank	Result	Rank
Daniel Vasquez	T12	5000m	—				18:01.58	11

=== Table tennis ===
Athlete	Event	Preliminaries				Quarterfinals	Semifinals	Final / BM	
Athlete	Event	Opposition Result	Opposition Result	Opposition Result	Rank	Opposition Result	Opposition Result	Opposition Result	Rank
Victor Solis	Men's singles 6	Schmidt (GER); L 0–3	M Jensen (DEN); L 0–3	Itkonen (SWE); L 0–3	4	did not advance			

=== Wheelchair tennis ===
Athlete	Class	Event	Round of 64	Round of 32	Round of 16	Quarterfinals	Semifinals	Finals
Athlete	Class	Event	Opposition Result	Opposition Result	Opposition Result	Opposition Result	Opposition Result	Opposition Result
Pablo Araya	Open	Quads' singles	—		van Erp (NED); L 1–6, 0-6	did not advance		
Robinson Mendez	Open	Men's singles	Chen Y L (TPE); W 4–6, 6–4, 6–0	Hall (AUS); L 0–6, 2–6	did not advance			

== See also ==
- Chile at the Paralympics
- Chile at the 2004 Summer Olympics
