= Chile at the 1996 Summer Paralympics =

- IPC code: CHI
- NPC: Chile Paralympic Committee
- Website: www.paralimpico.cl

in Atlanta
- Competitors: 2 in 2 sports
- Medals: Gold 0 Silver 0 Bronze 0 Total 0

Summer Paralympics appearances (overview)
- 1992; 1996; 2000; 2004; 2008; 2012; 2016; 2020; 2024

Two male athletes from Chile competed at the 1996 Summer Paralympics in Atlanta, United States.

== Powerlifting ==
Athlete	Event	Result	Rank
Víctor Valderrama	Men's -67.5 kg	NMR	

== Swimming ==
Athlete	Event	Heats		Final	
Athlete	Event	Time	Rank	Time	Rank
Gabriel Vallejos	Men's 50 m freestyle S3	1:10.53	10	Did not advance	
Gabriel Vallejos	Men's 50 m backstroke S3	1:11.91	7 Q	1:10.95	7
Gabriel Vallejos	Men's 50 m butterfly S3	—N/a		1:29.03	4
Gabriel Vallejos	Men's 50 m breaststroke SB2	1:21.12	8 Q	1:15.94	8

== See also ==
- Chile at the Paralympics
- Chile at the 1996 Summer Olympics
