= Chile at the 2022 Winter Paralympics =

- Flag of Chile
- IPC code: CHI
- NPC: Chilean Paralympic Committee
- Website: www.paralimpico.cl

in Beijing, China 4 March 2022 – 13 March 2022
- Competitors: 4 (3 on foot,1 on wheelchair) in 1 sport
- Flag bearer: Nicolás Bisquertt
- Medals: Gold 0 Silver 0 Bronze 0 Total 0

Winter Paralympics appearances (overview)
- 2002; 2006; 2010; 2014; 2018; 2022; 2026

Chile competed at the 2022 Winter Paralympics in Beijing, China which took place between 4–13 March 2022. Four alpine skiers represented Chile at the event.

== Competitors ==
The following is the list of number of competitors participating at the Games per sport/discipline.

Sport	Men	Women	Total
Alpine skiing	3	1	4
Total	3	1	4

== Alpine skiing ==
Chile sent four alpine skiers to compete in the Games.

Athlete	Event	Run 1		Run 2		Total	
Athlete	Event	Time	Rank	Time	Rank	Time	Rank
Nicolás Bisquertt	Men's super combined, sitting	1:16.51	12	52.07	9	2:08.58	9
Nicolás Bisquertt	Men's downhill, sitting	—N/a				Did not finish	
Nicolás Bisquertt	Men's giant slalom, sitting	1:05.80	11	1:05.41	17	2:11.21	14
Nicolás Bisquertt	Men's slalom, sitting	Did not finish					
Nicolás Bisquertt	Men's super-G, sitting	—N/a				1:17.06	12
Miguel Catalan	Men's giant slalom, sitting	1:20.05	33	1:14.52	29	2:34.57	29
Miguel Catalan	Men's slalom, sitting	Did not finish					
Samuel Fernández	Men's giant slalom, standing	1:25.00	35	1:21.03	34	2:46.03	34
Samuel Fernández	Men's slalom, standing	1:05.26	35	Did not finish			
Claudia Hernández	Women's giant slalom, standing	1:24.35	21	Did not finish			
Claudia Hernández	Women's slalom, standing	1:49.01	13	1:45.86	11	3:34.87	11

== See also ==
- Chile at the Paralympics
- Chile at the 2022 Winter Olympics
