= Chile at the 2010 Winter Paralympics =

- IPC code: CHI
- NPC: Chile Paralympic Committee
- Website: www.paralimpico.cl

in Vancouver
- Competitors: 2 in 1 sport
- Flag bearer: Tomás del Villar
- Medals: Gold 0 Silver 0 Bronze 0 Total 0

Winter Paralympics appearances (overview)
- 2002; 2006; 2010; 2014; 2018; 2022; 2026

Chile sent a delegation to compete at the 2010 Winter Paralympics, in Vancouver. It fielded a total of two athletes, both in alpine skiing.

== Alpine skiing ==
The following two athletes represented Chile in alpine skiing:

Athlete	Event	Final					
Athlete	Event	Run 1	Run 2	Run 3	Total Time	Calculated Time	Rank
Jorge Migueles	Men's Slalom Standing	DSQ					
Jorge Migueles	Men's Giant Slalom Standing	1:47.52				3:34.98	38
Tomás del Villar	Men's Slalom Sitting	1:43.10	41	2:23.2	35	4:06.25	34
Tomás del Villar	Men's Giant Slalom Sitting	DNF					

== See also ==
Interview with Jorge Migueles

- Chile at the 2010 Winter Olympics
- Chile at the Paralympics
