= Chile at the 2006 Winter Paralympics =

- IPC code: CHI
- NPC: Chile Paralympic Committee
- Website: www.paralimpico.cl

in Turin
- Competitors: 2 in 1 sport
- Medals Ranked 20th: Gold 0 Silver 0 Bronze 0 Total 0

Winter Paralympics appearances (overview)
- 2002; 2006; 2010; 2014; 2018; 2022; 2026

Chile participated in the ninth Winter Paralympics in Turin, Italy.

Chile entered two athletes in the following sports:

- Alpine skiing: 2 male

== Medalists ==
	(gold)	(silver)	(bronze)	Total
Chile	0	0	0	0

== See also ==
- 2006 Winter Paralympics
- Chile at the 2006 Winter Olympics
