= Chile at the 2008 Summer Paralympics =

- IPC code: CHI
- NPC: Chile Paralympic Committee
- Website: www.paralimpico.cl

in Beijing
- Competitors: 4 in 3 sports
- Flag bearers: Robinson Méndez (opening); Cristián Valenzuela (closing)
- Medals Ranked -th: Gold 0 Silver 0 Bronze 0 Total 0

Summer Paralympics appearances (overview)
- 1992; 1996; 2000; 2004; 2008; 2012; 2016; 2020; 2024

Chile competed at the 2008 Summer Paralympics in Beijing, China. The country's delegation consisted of four competitors: two wheelchair tennis players, one track and field athlete, and one swimmer. Other members of the delegation included the President of the Paralympic Federation of Chile, Mario Quijada, the Mission Chief, Patricio Bowen, and Doctor Alberto Vargas. The group left for Beijing on September 1. Tennis player Robinson Méndez was the country's flag bearer in the opening ceremony.

In tennis, Méndez and Francisco Cayulef competed in both singles and doubles events. Runner Cristián Valenzuela participated in the 1500 metre race, and swimmer Macarena Quero took part in the 50 metre freestyle S10 event.

== Athletics ==
Men

Athlete	Class	Event	Heats		Semifinal		Final		
Athlete	Class	Event	Result	Rank	Result	Rank	Result	Points	Rank
Cristian Valenzuela	T11	1500 m	4:27.94	4	did not advance				

== Swimming ==
Women

Athlete	Class	Event	Heats		Final	
Athlete	Class	Event	Result	Rank	Result	Rank
Macarena Quero	S10	50 m freestyle	34.78	15	did not advance	

== Wheelchair Tennis ==
Men

Athlete	Class	Event	Round of 64	Round of 32	1/8 Finals	Quarterfinals	Semifinals	Finals
Athlete	Class	Event	Opposition Result	Opposition Result	Opposition Result	Opposition Result	Opposition Result	Opposition Result
Francisco Cayulef	Open	Singles	Welch (USA); L 1–6, 1–6	did not advance				
Robinson Méndez	Open	Singles	Jeremiasz (FRA); L 1–6, 0–6	did not advance				
Robinson Méndez; Francisco Cayulef	Open	Doubles	N/A	Khulongrua - Kruamai (THA); L 0–6, 2–6	did not advance			

== See also ==
- Chile at the 2008 Summer Olympics
