= Chile at the 2012 Summer Paralympics =

- IPC code: CHI
- NPC: Chile Paralympic Committee
- Website: www.paralimpico.cl

in London
- Competitors: 7 in 4 sports
- Flag bearer: Cristian Valenzuela
- Medals Ranked 52nd: Gold 1 Silver 0 Bronze 0 Total 1

Summer Paralympics appearances (overview)
- 1992; 1996; 2000; 2004; 2008; 2012; 2016; 2020; 2024

Chile competed at the 2012 Summer Paralympics in London, United Kingdom from August 29 to September 9, 2012.

Chile won its first medal at this event.

== Medallists ==
Medal	Name	Sport	Event	Date
Gold	Cristian Valenzuela	Athletics	Men's 5000m T11	7 September

== Athletics ==
Men's Track and Road Events

Athlete	Event	Heat		Final	
Athlete	Event	Result	Rank	Result	Rank
Cristian Valenzuela	1500m T11	4:15.54	2 Q	4:07.79	4
Cristian Valenzuela	5000m T11	—N/a		15:26.26	Gold medal
Cristian Valenzuela	Marathon T12	—N/a		DNS	

== Swimming ==
Women

Athletes	Event	Heat		Final	
Athletes	Event	Time	Rank	Time	Rank
Francisca Castro	100m backstroke S10	1:17.71	12	Did not advance	

== Table tennis ==
Men

Athlete	Event	Group stage			Quarterfinals	Semifinals	Final	
Athlete	Event	Opposition Result	Opposition Result	Rank	Opposition Result	Opposition Result	Opposition Result	Rank
Cristian Dettoni	Individual C7	Nikolenko (UKR); L 0-3	Despineux (BEL); L 1-3	3	Did not advance			

== Wheelchair Tennis ==
Athlete	Event	Round of 64	Round of 32	Round of 16	Quarterfinals	Semifinals	Final	
Athlete	Event	Opposition Result	Opposition Result	Opposition Result	Opposition Result	Opposition Result	Opposition Result	Rank
Robinson Mendez	Men's singles	Mossier (AUT); L 6–3, 4–6, 2–6	Did not advance					
Diego Pérez	Men's singles	Jeremiasz (FRA); L 0–6, 0–6	Did not advance					
Robinson Mendez; Diego Pérez	Men's doubles	—N/a	Mossier, Legner (AUT); L 3–6, 5–7	Did not advance				
Francisca Mardones	Women's singles	—N/a	Jacinto Velez (ESP); W 6–3, 6–1	Van Koot (NED); L 0–6, 0–6	Did not advance			
Maria Antonieta Ortiz	Women's singles	—N/a	Krüger (GER); L 5–7, 5–7	Did not advance				
Francisca Mardones; Maria Antonieta Ortiz	Women's doubles	—N/a		Bernal Villalobos, Martinez Vega (COL); L 7–6, 4–6, 5–7	Did not advance			

== See also ==
- Chile at the 2012 Summer Olympics
