= Chile at the 1992 Summer Paralympics =

- IPC code: CHI
- NPC: Chile Paralympic Committee
- Website: www.paralimpico.cl

in Barcelona
- Competitors: 2 in 2 sports
- Medals Ranked 45th: Gold 1 Silver 0 Bronze 0 Total 1

Summer Paralympics appearances (overview)
- 1992; 1996; 2000; 2004; 2008; 2012; 2016; 2020; 2024

Chile competed at the 1992 Summer Paralympics in Barcelona, Spain. The 2 competitors from Chile won no medals and so did not place in the medal table. Swimmer Gabriel Vallejos Contreras, also known as Gabriel Angel, was presented with the Whang Youn Dai Achievement Award during the closing ceremony.

In Madrid Paralympics games Chile has First gold medal from Chile and This is the first medal from Paralympics games

== Powerlifting ==
Athlete	Event	Result	Rank
Víctor Valderrama	Men's -67.5 kg	125 kg	12

== Swimming ==
Athlete	Event	Heats		Final	
Athlete	Event	Time	Rank	Time	Rank
Gabriel Vallejos	Men's 50 m freestyle S3	1:24.07	4 Q	1:14.55	5
Gabriel Vallejos	Men's 100 m freestyle S3	2:45.79	3 Q	2:38.07	5
Gabriel Vallejos	Men's 50 m backstroke S3	1:17.47	3 Q	1:12.50	4
Gabriel Vallejos	Men's 50 m butterfly S3–4	1:26.55	3 Q	1:22.67	6
Gabriel Vallejos	Men's 50 m breaststroke SB2	1:17.22	4 Q	1:15.90	5

== See also ==
- Chile at the Paralympics
- Chile at the 1992 Summer Olympics
