= Swimming at the 2020 Summer Paralympics – Men's 50 metre backstroke S2 =

Men's 50 metre backstroke S2 at the XVI Paralympic Games
- Venue: Tokyo Aquatics Centre
- Dates: 2 September 2021
- Competitors: 12 from 9 nations

Medalists
| 1st place, gold medalist(s) | | Gabriel Araújo | Brazil |
| 2nd place, silver medalist(s) | | Alberto Abarza | Chile |
| 3rd place, bronze medalist(s) | | Vladimir Danilenko | RPC |

The Men's 50 metre backstroke S2 event at the 2020 Paralympic Games took place on 2 September 2021, at the Tokyo Aquatics Centre.

== Heats ==
The swimmers with the top eight times, regardless of heat, advanced to the final.

| Rank | Heat | Lane | Name | Nationality | Time | Notes |
|---|---|---|---|---|---|---|
| 1 | 2 | 4 | Gabriel Araújo | Brazil | 56.82 | Q |
| 2 | 2 | 5 | Alberto Abarza | Chile | 57.58 | Q |
| 3 | 1 | 4 | Roman Bondarenko | Ukraine | 59.30 | Q |
| 4 | 2 | 3 | Vladimir Danilenko | RPC | 59.31 | Q |
| 5 | 2 | 6 | Nikita Kazachiner | RPC | 1:00.51 | Q |
| 6 | 1 | 5 | Jacek Czech | Poland | 1:00.97 | Q |
| 7 | 1 | 6 | Ievgen Panibratets | Ukraine | 1:03.09 | Q |
| 8 | 1 | 2 | Aristeidis Makrodimitris | Greece | 1:04.01 | Q |
| 9 | 2 | 2 | Cristopher Tronco | Mexico | 1:05.57 | |
| 10 | 1 | 3 | Kamil Otowski | Poland | 1:06.59 | |
| 11 | 2 | 7 | Rodrigo Santillán | Peru | 1:06.99 | |
| 12 | 1 | 7 | Richard Mateo Vega | Colombia | 1:14.10 | |

== Final ==
| Rank | Lane | Name | Nationality | Time | Notes |
|---|---|---|---|---|---|
| 1st place, gold medalist(s) | 4 | Gabriel Araújo | Brazil | 53.96 | AM |
| 2nd place, silver medalist(s) | 5 | Alberto Abarza | Chile | 57.76 | |
| 3rd place, bronze medalist(s) | 6 | Vladimir Danilenko | RPC | 59.47 | |
| 4 | 2 | Nikita Kazachiner | RPC | 1.00.54 | |
| 5 | 3 | Roman Bondarenko | Ukraine | 1.00.61 | |
| 6 | 1 | Ievgen Panibratets | Ukraine | 1.03.00 | |
| 7 | 8 | Aristeidis Makrodimitris | Greece | 1.03.28 | |
| 8 | 7 | Jacek Czech | Poland | 1.05.13 | |
