= Chile at the 2026 Winter Paralympics =

- Flag of Chile
- IPC code: CHI
- NPC: Chile Paralympic Committee

in Milan & Cortina d'Ampezzo, Italy 6 March 2026 – 15 March 2026
- Competitors: 1 (1 man) in 1 sport
- Flag bearer (opening): Nicolás Bisquertt
- Flag bearer (closing): Nicolás Bisquertt
- Medals: Gold 0 Silver 0 Bronze 0 Total 0

Winter Paralympics appearances (overview)
- 2002; 2006; 2010; 2014; 2018; 2022; 2026

Chile will compete at the 2026 Winter Paralympics in Milan & Cortina d'Ampezzo, Italy, which will take place between 6–15 March 2026.

== Competitors ==
The following is the list of number of competitors participating at the Games per sport/discipline.

| Sport | Men | Women | Total |
|---|---|---|---|
| Para alpine skiing | 1 | 0 | 1 |
| Total | 1 | 0 | 1 |

== Para alpine skiing ==
| Athlete | Class | Event | Run 1 | | Run 2 | | Total | |
| Athlete | Class | Event | Time | Rank | Time | Rank | Time | Rank |
|---|---|---|---|---|---|---|---|---|
| Nicolás Bisquertt | LW10–2 | Downhill, sitting | —N/a | | | | DNF | |
| Nicolás Bisquertt | LW10–2 | Super-G, sitting | —N/a | | | | 1:16.40 | 8 |
| Nicolás Bisquertt | LW10–2 | Giant slalom, sitting | 1:08.86 | 6 | 1:09.27 | 4 | 2:18.13 | 6 |
| Nicolás Bisquertt | LW10–2 | Slalom, sitting | DNF | | | | | |
| Nicolás Bisquertt | LW10–2 | Super combined, sitting | 1:17.07 | 6 | 46.74 | 10 | 2:03.78 | 9 |

== See also ==
- Chile at the Paralympics
- Chile at the 2026 Winter Olympics
