= Chile at the 2014 Winter Paralympics =

- IPC code: CHI
- NPC: Chile Paralympic Committee
- Website: www.paralimpico.cl

in Sochi
- Competitors: 2 in 1 sport
- Medals: Gold 0 Silver 0 Bronze 0 Total 0

Winter Paralympics appearances (overview)
- 2002; 2006; 2010; 2014; 2018; 2022; 2026

Chile sent a delegation to compete at the 2014 Winter Paralympics in Sochi, Russia from 7–16 March 2014. This was Chile's fourth participation in a Winter Paralympic Games. The Chilean delegation consisted of two alpine skiers, Jorge Migueles and Santiago Vega. Migueles finished 25th in the men's standing slalom and 20th in the men's standing giant slalom, while Vega finished 32nd in the regular slalom.

== Background ==
Chile first joined Paralympic competition at the 1992 Summer Paralympics, and participated at the Winter Paralympics for the first time at the 2002 Winter Paralympics. They have participated in every Summer and Winter Paralympics since their respective debuts, making Sochi their fourth appearance at a Winter Paralympics. The nation has never won a Winter Paralympics medal. The 2014 Winter Paralympics were held from 7–16 March 2014, in Sochi, Russia; 45 countries and 547 athletes took part in the multi-sport event. The Chilean delegation consisted of two alpine skiers, Jorge Migueles and Santiago Vega. Migueles was chosen as the Chilean flag-bearer for the parade of nations during the opening ceremony, and Vega was chosen to carry the flag for the closing ceremony.

== Disability classification ==
Every participant at the Paralympics has their disability grouped into one of five disability categories: amputation, the condition may be congenital or sustained through injury or illness; cerebral palsy; wheelchair athletes, though there is often overlap between this and other categories; visual impairment, including blindness; and Les autres, any physical disability that does not fall strictly under one of the other categories, like dwarfism or multiple sclerosis. Each Paralympic sport then has its own classifications, dependent upon the specific physical demands of competition. Events are given a code, made of numbers and letters, describing the type of event and classification of the athletes competing. Events with "B" in the code are for athletes with visual impairment, codes LW1 to LW9 are for athletes who stand to compete and LW10 to LW12 are for athletes who compete sitting down. Alpine skiing events grouped athletes into separate competitions for sitting, standing and visually impaired athletes.

== Alpine skiing ==
Migueles was 26 years old at the time of the Sochi Paralympics. When he was eight years old, he was hit by a bus, which resulted in his right leg being amputated below the knee; he is classified as LW4 and therefore competes in a standing position. On 13 March, he took part in the standing slalom, posting run times of 57.98 seconds and 1 minute and 7.42 seconds. His total time was 2 minutes and 5.40 seconds, which put him in 25th place out of 35 classified finishers, and off the gold medal time of 1 minute and 38.97 seconds set by Alexey Bugaev of Russia. Two days later he competed in the standing giant slalom, where he completed his first run in 1 minute and 26.41 seconds and the second in a faster time of 1 minute and 22.39 seconds. His final time was 2 minutes and 48.80 seconds, which ranked him 20th out of 29 competitors who finished the race. The gold medal was won by Vincent Gauthier-Manuel of France in a time of 2 minutes and 25.87 seconds

Vega was born with phocomelia in his right leg, which was amputated as an infant. He is classified as LW4, and competes in a standing position, and he was 17 years old at the time of the Sochi Paralympics. In the standing slalom, he posted run times of 1 minute and 14.04 seconds and 1 minute and 14.59 seconds. His combined time of 2 minutes and 28.63 seconds saw him finish in 32nd place. In the standing giant slalom, he ran wide of a gate approximately a minute into his run, and was eliminated. Vega would return to the Paralympics to represent Chile at the 2018 Winter Paralympics.

Athlete	Event	Run 1			Run 2			Final/Total		
Athlete	Event	Time	Diff	Rank	Time	Diff	Rank	Time	Diff	Rank
Jorge Migueles	Slalom, standing	57.98	+10.29	27	1:07.42	+16.14	25	2:05.40	+26.43	25
Jorge Migueles	Giant slalom, standing	1:26.41	+11.69	23	1:22.39	+11.24	21	2:48.80	+22.93	20
Santiago Vega	Slalom, standing	1:14.04	+26.35	42	1:14.59	+23.31	32	2:28.63	+49.66	32
Santiago Vega	Giant slalom, standing	DNF								

== See also ==
- Chile at the Paralympics
- Chile at the 2014 Winter Olympics
