= Murat Turan =

Turkish para-archer (born 1975)

Personal information
- Nationality: Turkish
- Born: 27 April 1975 (age 51) Turkey

Sport
- Country: Turkey
- Sport: Paralympic archery
- Event: Compound bow W2
Medal record
Men's Compound bow W2
Representing Turkey
World Para Championships
Silver medal – second place	2019 s-Hertogenbosch	Ind. compound open
Silver medal – second place	2019 s-Hertogenbosch	Teeam compound open

Murat Turan (born 27 April 1975) is a Turkish Paralympian Archer competing in the Men's compound bow W2 event. He is competing at the 2020 Summer Paralympics in the individual compound open event.

He won the silver medal in the Individual compound open and another silver medal with his teammates in the Team compound open events at the 2019 World Para Archery Championships in 's-Hertogenbosch, Netherlands.
