= Chile at the 2020 Summer Paralympics =

- IPC code: CHI
- NPC: Chilean Paralympic Committee

in Tokyo
- Competitors: 19 in 7 sports
- Flag bearers: Francisca Mardones & Alberto Abarza
- Medals Ranked 45th: Gold 2 Silver 3 Bronze 1 Total 6

Summer Paralympics appearances (overview)
- 1992; 1996; 2000; 2004; 2008; 2012; 2016; 2020; 2024

Chile competed at the 2020 Summer Paralympics from 24 August to 5 September 2021.

== Medalists ==
Medal	Name	Sport	Event	Date
Gold	Alberto Abarza	Swimming	Men's 100 metre backstroke S2	25 August
Gold	Francisca Mardones	Athletics	Women's shot put F54	30 August
Silver	Alberto Abarza	Swimming	Men's 200 metre freestyle S2	29 August
Silver	Mariana Zúñiga	Archery	Women's individual compound open	30 August
Silver	Alberto Abarza	Swimming	Men's 50 metre backstroke S2	2 September
Bronze	Katherinne Wollermann	Paracanoeing	Women's KL1	4 September

== Archery ==
Chile qualified one female archer. Mariana Zuñiga qualified by winning gold at the Pan American Championships in Monterrey, Mexico.

Athlete	Event	Ranking Round		Round of 32	Round of 16	Quarterfinals	Semifinals	Final / BM	
Athlete	Event	Score	Seed	Opposition Score	Opposition Score	Opposition Score	Opposition Score	Opposition Score	Rank
Mariana Zúñiga	Women's individual compound open	671	14	Zhou (CHN); W 144–137	Cüre (TUR); W 143–140	Lin (CHN); W 138(X+)-138(10)	Artakhinova (RPC); W 142–141	Paterson Pine (GBR); L 133–134	Silver medal

== Athletics ==
Four Chilean athlete has qualified to compete at the 2020 Summer Paralympics (three women and one man).

Men's track

Athlete	Event	Heats		Final	
Athlete	Event	Result	Rank	Result	Rank
Cristian Valenzuela; Guide: Matías Andrés Silva	5000m T11	—N/a		17:15.14	8
Cristian Valenzuela; Guide: Matías Andrés Silva	1500m T11	4:14.85	6	4:30.04	7

Women's track

Athlete	Event	Heats		Final	
Athlete	Event	Result	Rank	Result	Rank
Amanda Cerna	200m T47	27.13	4	did not advance	
Amanda Cerna	400m T47	1:00.04	4	1:00.12	6
Margarita Faundez	1500m T11	5:46.50	5	did not advance	

Women's field

Athlete	Event	Final	
Athlete	Event	Result	Rank
Francisca Mardones	Women's discus throw F55	18.53	10
Francisca Mardones	Women's shot put F54	8.33	Gold medal

== Paracanoeing ==
One Chilean paracanoeist has qualified to compete at the 2020 Summer Paralympics after being placed in the top five at the 2019 ICF Canoe Sprint World Championships.

Key

- Note–Ranks given for are within the athlete's heat only
- Qualification Legend: FA =Qualify to final (medal); FB =Qualify to final B (non-medal); SF =Qualify to semifinal

Athlete	Event	Heats		Semifinal		Final	
Athlete	Event	Time	Rank	Time	Rank	Time	Rank
Katherinne Wollermann	Women's KL1	57.121	1 FA	Bye		55.921	Bronze medal

== Powerlifting ==
Athlete	Event	Total lifted	Rank
Juan Carlos Garrido	Men's – 59kg	183	4
Camila Campos	Women's – 55kg	115	4
Jorge Carinao	Men's – 65kg	—	
Marion Serrano	Women's – 86kg	117	6

== Swimming ==
Two Chilean male swimmers has qualified to compete at the 2020 Summer Paralympics via MQS.

Men

Athlete	Event	Heats		Final	
Athlete	Event	Result	Rank	Result	Rank
Alberto Abarza	100m backstroke S2	2:02.28	2	2:00.40	Gold medal
Alberto Abarza	200m freestyle S2	4:18.25	2	4:14.17	Silver medal
Alberto Abarza	50m backstroke S2	57.58	2	57.76	Silver medal
Vicente Almonacid	100m breaststroke SB8	1:12.11	7	1:12.69	8

== Table tennis ==
Two Chilean table tennis players have qualified to compete at the 2020 Summer Paralympics after winning gold medals at the 2019 Parapan American Games and one qualified via World Ranking allocation. Matias Pino was stripped off his Paralympic slot when he was convicted of a doping violation by taking octopamine in August 2019 which resulted in him losing two medals at the Parapans and his Paralympic slot was given to the United States.

Men

Athlete	Event	Group Stage			Round of 16	Quarterfinals	Semifinals	Final	
Athlete	Event	Opposition Result	Opposition Result	Rank	Opposition Result	Opposition Result	Opposition Result	Opposition Result	Rank
Luis Flores	Men's singles C2	Ludrovský (SVK); W 3–2	Chueawong (THA); W 3–2	1	Yezyk (UKR); L 2-3	did not advance			9
Cristián González	Men's singles C4	Turan (TUR); L 0–3	Zhang (CHN); W 3-2	2	Lopez Sayago (ESP); L 0–3	did not advance			9
Cristian Dettoni	Men's singles C6	Valera (ESP); W 3-0	Chatzikyriakos (GRE); L 2-3	1	—N/a	Seidenfeld (USA); L 2-3	did not advance		5
Luis Flores; Cristián González	Men's team C4-5	—N/a				Cao / Guo (CHN); L 0-2	did not advance		5

Women

Athlete	Event	Group Stage			Round of 16	Quarterfinals	Semifinals	Final	
Athlete	Event	Opposition Result	Opposition Result	Rank	Opposition Result	Opposition Result	Opposition Result	Opposition Result	Rank
Tamara Leonelli	Women's singles C5	Pan (CHN); L 0–3	Jung (KOR); L 0–3	3	did not advance				

== Wheelchair tennis ==
Chile qualified three player entries for wheelchair tennis. Two of them qualified through the world rankings, while the other qualified under the bipartite commission invitation allocation quota.

Athlete	Event	Round of 64	Round of 32	Round of 16	Quarterfinals	Semifinals	Final / BM	
Athlete	Event	Opposition Result	Opposition Result	Opposition Result	Opposition Result	Opposition Result	Opposition Result	Rank
Alexander Cataldo	Men's singles	Dharmasena (SRI); W 6-3, 6-4	Spaargaren (NED); L 2-6, 3-6	did not advance				17
Jaime Sepulveda	Men's singles	Jaroszewski (POL); L 6-1, 4-6, 4-6	did not advance					33
Cataldo / Sepulveda	Men's doubles	—N/a	Fabisiak / Jaroszewski (POL); W 6-3, 4-6, 6-3	Anker / Spaargaren (NED); N 1-6, 5-7	did not advance			9
Macarena Cabrillana	Women's singles	—N/a	De Groot (NED); L 1-6, 0-6	did not advance				17

== See also ==
- Chile at the Paralympics
- Chile at the 2020 Summer Olympics
