= Chile at the 2000 Summer Paralympics =

- IPC code: CHI
- NPC: Chile Paralympic Committee
- Website: www.paralimpico.cl

in Sydney
- Competitors: 4 in 3 sports
- Medals: Gold 0 Silver 0 Bronze 0 Total 0

Summer Paralympics appearances (overview)
- 1992; 1996; 2000; 2004; 2008; 2012; 2016; 2020; 2024

There were 0 female and 4 male athletes representing the country at the 2000 Summer Paralympics.

== Athletics ==
Field events

Athlete	Event	Final	
Athlete	Event	Distance	Rank
Víctor Gonelli	Men's shot put F56	8.47	8

== Powerlifting ==
Athlete	Event	Result	Rank
Juan Carlos Garrido	Men's -48 kg	142.5 kg	6
Víctor Valderrama	Men's -75 kg	172.5 kg	10

== Swimming ==
Athlete	Event	Heats		Final	
Athlete	Event	Time	Rank	Time	Rank
Gabriel Vallejos	Men's 50 m freestyle S3	1:02.51	3 Q	1:02.20	6
Gabriel Vallejos	Men's 100 m freestyle S3	2:12.75	4 Q	2:11.49	8
Gabriel Vallejos	Men's 200 m freestyle S3	—		4:42.84	7
Gabriel Vallejos	Men's 50 m backstroke S3	—		1:04.44	6
Gabriel Vallejos	Men's 50 m breaststroke SB2	1:21.71	5	Did not advance	

== See also ==
- 2000 Summer Paralympics

== Bibliography ==
- International Paralympic Committee (2000). "Appendix C: Athlete Numbers - By Delegation". Sydney 2000 Paralympic Games Post Games Report. Sydney.
