= Chile at the 2018 Winter Paralympics =

- IPC code: CHI
- NPC: Chile Paralympic Committee
- Website: www.paralimpico.cl

in PyeongChang, South Korea
- Competitors: 4 in 1 sport
- Medals: Gold 0 Silver 0 Bronze 0 Total 0

Winter Paralympics appearances (overview)
- 2002; 2006; 2010; 2014; 2018; 2022; 2026

Chile sent competitors to the 2018 Winter Paralympics in Pyeongchang, South Korea. There were 4 people in para-alpine skiing. The skiers went to races to be allowed to go to South Korea. Starting in November 2017, they went to 15 races in Europe, the United States and Canada to get ready. Santiago Vega went to the 2014 Winter Paralympics. Nicolás Bisquert, Diego Seguel and Julio Soto were going to their first Paralympic Games.

== Team ==
Chile had 4 people at the 2018 Winter Paralympics. In the past, Diego Seguel was part of Team Chile at competitions around the world in another sport: para-athletics. All four had 220 points by February 2018. They needed to have 220 total points or more in the time between when the 2014 Winter Paralympics ended and February 2018. Vega competed at the 2014 Winter Paralympics for Chile. He was the only member of the team to do that. The 2018 Games will be the first for Bisquert, Seguel and Soto.

The table below contains the list of members of people (called "Team Chile") that participated in the 2018 Games.

Team Chile
Name	Sport	Gender	Classification	Events	ref
Nicolás Bisquert	para-alpine skiing	male	LW10.2	slalom, giant slalom, super giant, downhill	
Diego Seguel	para-alpine skiing	male		slalom, giant slalom	
Julio Soto	para-alpine skiing	male	LW2	slalom, giant slalom	
Santiago Vega	para-alpine skiing	male	LW4	slalom, giant slalom	

== Results ==
=== Alpine skiing ===
For the super combined event, the first run is the super-G and the second run is the slalom.

Men

Athlete	Class	Event	Run 1		Run 2		Total	
Athlete	Class	Event	Time	Rank	Time	Rank	Time	Rank
Nicolas Bisquertt	LW10-2	Downhill, sitting	—N/a				1:31.08	13
Nicolas Bisquertt	LW10-2	Super-G, sitting	—N/a				DNF	
Nicolas Bisquertt	LW10-2	Super combined, sitting	DNF		—N/a			
Nicolas Bisquertt	LW10-2	Giant slalom, sitting	1:09.75	5	DNF		—N/a	
Nicolas Bisquertt	LW10-2	Slalom, sitting	59.39	12	55.23	9	1:54.62	9
Diego Seguel	LW12-1	Giant slalom, sitting	1:23.69	25	DNF		—N/a	
Diego Seguel	LW12-1	Slalom, sitting	DNF		—N/a			
Julio Soto	LW2	Giant slalom, standing	1:25.94	36	1:27.81	28	2:53.75	28
Julio Soto	LW2	Slalom, standing	DNF		—N/a			
Santiago Vega	LW4	Giant slalom, standing	1:15.75	30	DNF		—N/a	
Santiago Vega	LW4	Slalom, standing	DNF		—N/a			
