= Maria Andrea Virgilio =

Italian Paralympic archer (born 1996)

Personal information
- Born: 17 November 1996 (age 29) Bagno a Ripoli, Italy

Sport
- Country: Italy
- Sport: Paralympic archery
- Event: Compound bow W2
Medal record
Women's archery Compound bow W2
Representing Italy
Paralympic Games
Bronze medal – third place	2020 Tokyo	Individual compound W2

Maria Andrea Virgilio (born 17 November 1996) is an Italian Paralympic archer. She won bronze in the Women's individual compound open at the 2020 Summer Paralympics in Tokyo.

She competed at the 2018 European Para Archery Championships, and 2019 European Para-Archery Cup.

She won the silver medal in her event at the 2022 World Para Archery Championships held in Dubai, United Arab Emirates.
