= Vladimir Danilenko =

Russian Paralympic swimmer

Personal information
- National team: Russia
- Born: 23 September 1999 (age 26) St. Petersburg, Russia

Sport
- Country: Russia
- Disability class: S2
- Event: Freestyle
Medal record
Paralympic swimming
Representing RPC
Paralympic Games
| Bronze medal – third place | 2020 Tokyo | 200 m freestyle S2 |
| Bronze medal – third place | 2020 Tokyo | 50 m backstroke S2 |
Representing Neutral Paralympic Athletes
Paralympic Games
| Silver medal – second place | 2024 Paris | 200 m freestyle S2 |
| Silver medal – second place | 2024 Paris | 50 m backstroke S2 |
| Silver medal – second place | 2024 Paris | 100 m backstroke S2 |
World Championships
| Silver medal – second place | 2025 Singapore | 100 m backstroke S2 |
| Silver medal – second place | 2025 Singapore | 200 m freestyle S2 |
| Silver medal – second place | 2025 Singapore | 50 m backstroke S2 |
European Championships
| Gold medal – first place | 2024 Funchal | 200 m freestyle S2 |
| Gold medal – first place | 2024 Funchal | 100 m backstroke S2 |
| Gold medal – first place | 2026 Kocaeli | 200 m freestyle S2 |
| Silver medal – second place | 2024 Funchal | 50 m backstroke S2 |

Vladimir Danilenko (Russian: Владимир Даниленко; born 23 September 1999) is a Russian Paralympic swimmer.

== Career ==
He represented the Russian Paralympic Committee athletes at the 2020 Summer Paralympics and won bronze medals in the 200 metre freestyle S2 and 50 metre backstroke S2 events.
