= Bair Shigaev =

Russian paralympic archer (born 1982)

Personal information
- Born: 16 December 1982 (age 43)

Sport
- Country: RPC
- Sport: Archery
Medal record
Men's compound para-archery
Representing RPC
Paralympic Games
Bronze medal – third place	2020 Tokyo	Team open
World Para Archery Championship
Gold medal – first place	2022 Dubai	Team open
Silver medal – second place	2019 's-Hertogenbosch	Team open
Bronze medal – third place	2022 Dubai	Individual open

Bair Shigaev (born 16 December 1982) is a Russian paralympic archer. He competed at the 2020 Summer Paralympics in the archery competition, winning the bronze medal in the mixed team compound event on open class with his teammate, Stepanida Artakhinova. Shigaev also competed at the 2022 World Para Archery Championships.
