= Amanda Cerna =

Chilean athletics competitor

Personal information
- Full name: Amanda Francisca Cerna Gamboa
- Born: 3 September 1998 (age 27) Santiago, Chile

Sport
- Country: Chile
- Sport: Paralympic athletics
- Disability class: T47
Medal record
Paralympic athletics
Representing Chile
World Para Athletics Junior Championships
Gold medal – first place	2017 Nottwil	200m T47
Silver medal – second place	2017 Nottwil	100m T47
Parapan American Games
Silver medal – second place	2019 Lima	400m T47
Bronze medal – third place	2023 Santiago	400m T47

Amanda Francisca Cerna Gamboa (born 3 September 1998) is a T47 class Paralympian for Chile. She received a silver medal for Chile at the 2019 Parapan American Games, she is also a World Junior champion and competed at 2016 and 2020 Summer Paralympics, her highest achievement at the Paralympic Games was finishing fourth in the 400m T47 at the 2016 Summer Paralympics.
