= Ramezan Biabani =

Iranian Paralympic archer (born 1979)

Personal information
- Nationality: Iranian
- Born: 25 May 1979 (age 47) Sari, Iran

Sport
- Sport: Archery
Medal record
Men's Archery
Representing Iran
Paralympic Games
Silver medal – second place	2020 Tokyo	Men's Individual Compound - Open
World Para Archery Championship
Gold medal – first place	2019 's-Hertogenbosch	Mixed Team Compound
Gold medal – first place	2022 Dubai	Mixed Team Compound
Silver medal – second place	2019 Beijing	Mixed Team Compound
Islamic Solidarity Games
Gold medal – first place	2021 Konya	Mixed Team Compound

Ramezan Biabani (Persian: رمضان بیابانی, born June 25, 1979) is an Iranian Paralympic archer. He represented Iran at the 2020 Summer Paralympics in Tokyo, Japan and won the silver medal in the Men's individual compound event.
