= Jyoti Baliyan =

Indian archer and Olympian

Personal information
- Nationality: Indian
- Born: 15 April 1994 (age 32) Goela village, Muzaffarnagar, Uttar Pradesh, India

Sport
- Country: India
- Sport: Para-archery
- Rank: 38th
Medal record
World Para Archery Championships
Silver medal – second place	2022 Dubai	Compound - Mixed Team
Asian Para Archery Championships
Silver medal – second place	2019 Bangkok	Compound Team

Jyoti Baliyan (born 15 April 1994), also known as Jyoti, is an Indian para archer. She competed at 2020 Summer Paralympics.

== Career ==
She competed at 2020 Summer Paralympics held at Tokyo, Japan. However she lost to Irish Archer, Kerrie-Lousie Leonard in round of 16.

She became the first athlete to win a medal international championships. She competed along with Shyam Sunder Swami in Compound Archery Mixed Team event. They won silver medal in the event.

She also has won medal at Asian Para Archery Championship.
