= Stepanida Artakhinova =

Russian Paralympic archer (born 1989)

Personal information
- Nationality: Russian
- Born: 13 September 1989 (age 36) Ulakhan-Mungku, Russia

Sport
- Sport: Archery
Medal record
Archery
Representing RPC
Paralympic Games
Bronze medal – third place	2020 Tokyo	Mixed team compound

Stepanida Artakhinova (born 13 September 1989) is a Russian Paralympic archer. She competed in the 2012 Summer Paralympics, winning a bronze medal. She competed at the 2020 Summer Paralympics, in Team compound open, winning a bronze medal with her teammate, Bair Shigaev.

She competed at the 2015 World Archery Para Championships, winning a bronze medal.
