= Alberto Abarza =

Chilean Paralympic swimmer (born 1984)

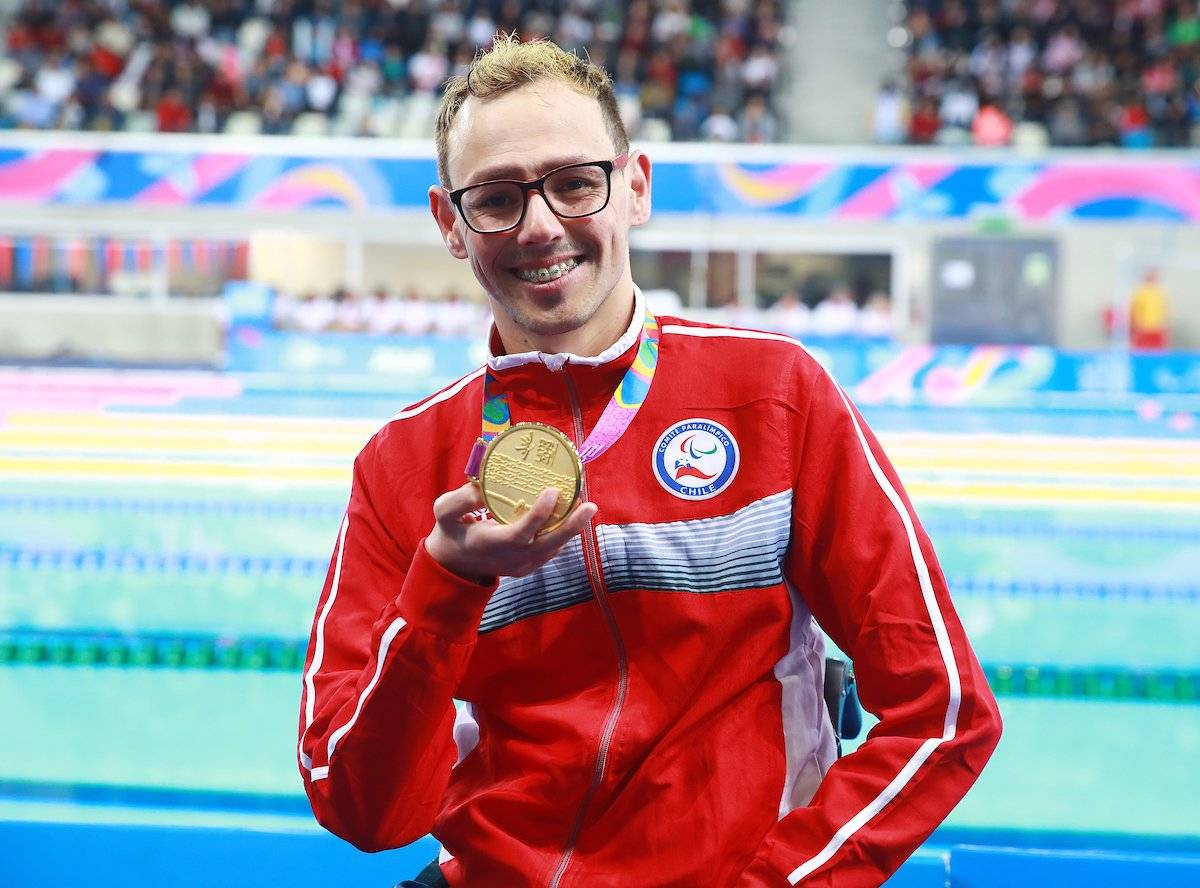
- Abarza at the 2019 Parapan American Games

Personal information
- Full name: Alberto Caroly Abarza Díaz
- Nicknames: Carolito, Beto
- Born: 11 December 1984 (age 41) San Bernardo, Chile

Sport
- Country: Chile
- Sport: Paralympic swimming
- Disability: Charcot-Marie-Tooth disease
- Disability class: S2
Medal record
Paralympic swimming
Representing Chile
Paralympic Games
Gold medal – first place	2020 Tokyo	100 m backstroke S2
Silver medal – second place	2020 Tokyo	50 m backstroke S2
Silver medal – second place	2020 Tokyo	200 m freestyle S2
Bronze medal – third place	2024 Paris	200 m freestyle S2
Bronze medal – third place	2024 Paris	50 m backstroke S2
Bronze medal – third place	2024 Paris	100 m backstroke S2
World Championships
Silver medal – second place	2019 London	200 m freestyle S2
Silver medal – second place	2022 Madeira	100 m backstroke S2
Silver medal – second place	2022 Madeira	200 m freestyle S2
Silver medal – second place	2023 Manchester	100 m backstroke S2
Bronze medal – third place	2017 Mexico City	50 m backstroke S2
Bronze medal – third place	2017 Mexico City	100 m backstroke S2
Bronze medal – third place	2017 Mexico City	200 m freestyle S2
Bronze medal – third place	2019 London	100 m backstroke S2
Bronze medal – third place	2022 Madeira	50 m backstroke S2
Bronze medal – third place	2023 Manchester	200 m freestyle S2
Bronze medal – third place	2025 Singapore	200 m freestyle S2
Parapan American Games
Gold medal – first place	2019 Lima	50 m backstroke S2
Gold medal – first place	2019 Lima	100 m backstroke S2
Gold medal – first place	2019 Lima	200 m freestyle S2
Silver medal – second place	2019 Lima	50 m freestyle S2
Silver medal – second place	2019 Lima	100 m freestyle S2
Silver medal – second place	2023 Santiago	50 m backstroke S2
Silver medal – second place	2023 Santiago	100 m backstroke S2
Silver medal – second place	2023 Santiago	50 m freestyle S2
Silver medal – second place	2023 Santiago	100 m freestyle S2
Silver medal – second place	2023 Santiago	200 m freestyle S2

Alberto Caroly Abarza Díaz (born 11 December 1984) is a Chilean Paralympic swimmer who competes in international elite events. He is a triple Parapan American Games champion and a four-time World silver medalist. He competed at the 2020 Summer Paralympics, winning a gold medal and two silver medals.

== Career ==
Abarza entered the S4 50m breaststroke and 50m backstroke in the 2015 Parapan American Games. He came didn't get a medal in either event, coming 8th in the breaststroke. In the 2016 Paralympics he entered the S3 50m freestyle and 50m backstroke. He didn't get a medal in either event, coming 8th in the backstroke. In the 2019 Parapan American Games he entered three events, the S2 50m freestyle, 100m freestyle & 200m freestyle. He won medals in all three events, gold in the 200m, and silver in the 50m and 100m.

== Honours ==
Abarza has won the Para Athlete of the Year awards twice in 2018 and 2019 after winning medals in his international swimming competitions.

== Personal life ==
Abarza was born with Charcot-Marie-Tooth syndrome, a neurodegenerative disease which causes progressive loss of muscular tissue.
