= Chile at the 2019 Parapan American Games =

- Flag of Chile
- IPC code: CHI
- NPC: Chilean Paralympic Committee
- Website: www.comiteparalimpicochileno.org

in Lima, Peru August 23, 2019 – September 1, 2019
- Flag bearer: Alberto Abarza
- Medals Ranked 8th: Gold 10 Silver 12 Bronze 11 Total 33

Parapan American Games appearances
- 1999; 2003; 2007; 2011; 2015; 2019; 2023

Chile competed at the 2019 Parapan American Games held from August 23 to September 1, 2019, in Lima, Peru. In total athletes representing Chile won 10 gold medals, 12 silver medals and 11 bronze medals and the country finished in 8th place in the medal table.

== Competitors ==
The following is the list of number of competitors (per gender) participating at the games per sport/discipline.

Sport	Women	Men	Total
Boccia	1	4	5
Athletics	6	5	11
Badminton	1	3	4
Cycling	2	6	8
Powerlifting	4	7	11
Swimming	5	4	9
Table Tennis	2	9	11
Wheelchair Basketball	11	-	11
Wheelchair Rugby	1	11	12
Wheelchair Tennis	2	3	5
Total	35	52	87

== Medalists ==
Medal	Name	Sport	Event	Date
Gold	Tamara Leonelli	Table Tennis	Women's Singles C5	August 23
Gold	Cristián González	Table Tennis	Men's Singles C4	August 24
Gold	Mauricio Orrego	Athletics	Men's 1500m T46	August 25
Gold	Valentina Muñoz	Swimming	Women's 100m Backstroke S8	August 25
Gold	Alberto Abarza	Swimming	Men's 200m Freestyle S2(S1-S2)	August 26
Gold	Vicente Almonacid	Swimming	Men's 100m Breaststroke SB8	August 26
Gold	Alberto Abarza	Swimming	Men's 50m Backstroke S2(S1)	August 27
Gold	Cristián González; Maximiliano Rodríguez	Table Tennis	Men's Team C3-5	August 27
Gold	Alberto Abarza	Swimming	Men's 100m Backstroke S2(S1)	August 28
Gold	Juan Garrido Acevedo	Powerlifting	Men's 59 kg	August 30
Silver	Luis Flores	Table Tennis	Men's C2	August 24
Silver	Francisca Mardones	Athletics	Women's Shot Put F53/54/55	August 25
Silver	Amanda Cerna	Athletics	Women's 400m T47	August 26
Silver	Luis Flores; Vicente Leiva	Table Tennis	Men's Team C1-2	August 27
Silver	Gustavo Castro; Manuel Echaveguren	Table Tennis	Men's Team C9-10	August 27
Silver	Camila Campos	Powerlifting	Women's 55 kg	August 29
Silver	Vicente Almonacid	Swimming	Men's 200m Individual Medley SM8	August 29
Silver	Macarena Cabrillana	Wheelchair tennis	Women's Singles	August 29
Silver	Jorge Carinao	Powerlifting	Men's 65 kg	August 30
Silver	María Ortíz	Powerlifting	Women's 73 kg	August 30
Silver	Alberto Abarza	Swimming	Men's 50m Freestyle S2(S1)	August 30
Silver	Alberto Abarza	Swimming	Men's 100m Freestyle S2(S1)	August 31
Bronze	Manuel Echaveguren	Table Tennis	Men's C10	August 24
Bronze	Maximiliano Rodriguez	Table Tennis	Men's C4	August 24
Bronze	Ignacio Torres	Table Tennis	Men's C6	August 24
Bronze	Cristián Dettoni	Table Tennis	Men's C6	August 24
Bronze	Ailyn Espinoza	Table Tennis	Women's C8-10	August 24
Bronze	Margarita Faúndez	Athletics	Women's 1500m T11	August 25
Bronze	Francisca Mardones	Athletics	Women's javelin throw T54	August 25
Bronze	Alexander Cataldo; Diego Pérez	Wheelchair tennis	Men's Doubles	August 29
Bronze	Pamela Muñoz	Powerlifting	Women's 61 kg and 67 kg combined	August 30
Bronze	Vicente Almonacid	Swimming	Men's 50m Freestyle S8	August 30
Bronze	Marión Serrano	Powerlifting	Women's 79 kg and 86 kg combined	August 31

Medals by sport
Sport	1st place, gold medalist(s)	2nd place, silver medalist(s)	3rd place, bronze medalist(s)	Total
Swimming	5	3	1	9
Table tennis	3	3	5	11
Powerlifting	1	3	2	6
Athletics	1	2	2	5
Wheelchair tennis	0	1	1	2
Total	10	12	11	33

Medals by day
Day	1st place, gold medalist(s)	2nd place, silver medalist(s)	3rd place, bronze medalist(s)	Total
August 23	1	0	0	1
August 24	1	1	5	7
August 25	2	1	2	5
August 26	2	1	0	3
August 27	2	2	0	4
August 28	1	0	0	1
August 29	0	3	1	4
August 30	1	3	2	6
August 31	0	1	1	2
Total	10	12	11	33

== Athletics ==
Eleven athletes represented the Chile at the 2019 Parapan American Games.

Men's track

Athlete	Event	Heats		Final	
Athlete	Event	Result	Rank	Result	Rank
Wladimir Palma	1500m T20	—N/a		4:18.23	5
Mauricio Orrego	1500m T46	—N/a		4:12.35	1st place, gold medalist(s)
Ignacio Sepulveda	1500m T46	—N/a		4:18.09	4

Men's field

Athlete	Event	Final		
Athlete	Event	Result	Points	Rank
Alan Moyano	Shot Put F53/54	7.66	659	5
Alan Moyano	Javelin Throw F54	17.80	-	4
Rodrigo Coloma	Shot Put F53/54	8.04	727	4
Rodrigo Coloma	Javelin Throw F54	17.02	-	5

Women's track

Athlete	Event	Heats		Final	
Athlete	Event	Result	Rank	Result	Rank
Franchesca Espinoza	400m T20	—N/a		1:02.98	5
Amanda Cerna	100m T47	13.54	6	13.23	4
Amanda Cerna	200m T47	27.33	6	27.10	4
Amanda Cerna	400m T47	1:03.75	3	1:00.07	2nd place, silver medalist(s)
Josefa Lopez	100m T47	14.35	11	did not advance	
Josefa Lopez	200m T47	28.80	10	did not advance	
Josefa Lopez	400m T47	1:05.35	6	1:05.76	7
Macarena Arriagada	100m T47	14.75	12	did not advance	
Macarena Arriagada	200m T47	30.94	11	did not advance	
Macarena Arriagada	400m T47	-	DQ	did not advance	
Margarita Faundez	1500m T11	—N/a		5:11.20	3rd place, bronze medalist(s)

Women's field

Athlete	Event	Final		
Athlete	Event	Result	Points	Rank
Francisca Mardones	Shot Put F53/54/55	7.67	973	2nd place, silver medalist(s)
Francisca Mardones	Discus Throw F55	18.45	-	6
Francisca Mardones	Javelin Throw F54	13.75	-	3rd place, bronze medalist(s)

== Badminton ==
Men

Athlete	Event	Preliminaries			Semifinals	Final / BM	
Athlete	Event	Opposition Result	Opposition Result	Rank	Opposition Result	Opposition Result	Rank
Brayan Abarca	Singles SS6	Krajewski (USA); L 0-2	Lightfoot (CAN); L 0-2	3	did not advance		6
Constancio Cancino; Jaime Aranguiz	Doubles WH1-WH2	Conceiao / Godoy (BRA); L 0-2	Palma / Pimentel (MEX); W 2-0	2 Q	Cano / Soares (BRA); L 0-2	Did not advance	4

Women

Athlete	Event	Preliminaries			Semifinals	Final / BM	
Athlete	Event	Opposition Result	Opposition Result	Rank	Opposition Result	Opposition Result	Rank
Catalina Jimeno	Singles WH2	Souza (BRA); L 0-2	Chokyu (CAN); L 0-2	3	did not advance		5

== Boccia ==
Chile secured five quotas in boccia.

Athlete	Event	Preliminaries			Quarterfinals	Semifinals	Final	
Athlete	Event	Opponent	Opposition Score	Rank	Opposition Score	Opposition Score	Opposition Score	Rank
Germán Calderón	Individual BC1	Ventura (MEX)	DNS	3	did not advance			
Germán Calderón	Individual BC1	Oliveira (BRA)	DNS	3	did not advance			
Javier Bastias	Individual BC2	Santos (BRA)	L 4-7	3	did not advance			
Javier Bastias	Individual BC2	Delgado (ECU)	L 2-3	3	did not advance			
Andrea Guzman	Individual BC2	Aquino (ARG)	L 4-9	3	did not advance			
Andrea Guzman	Individual BC2	Paredes (MEX)	L 0-10	3	did not advance			
Lenik Sepulveda	Individual BC2	Sayes (ESA)	L 0-7	3	did not advance			
Lenik Sepulveda	Individual BC2	De Faria (BRA)	L 3-4	3	did not advance			
Jonatan González	Individual BC3	Oliveira (BRA)	L 0-10	3	did not advance			
Jonatan González	Individual BC3	Fleisch (USA)	L 1-5	3	did not advance			

== Cycling ==
=== Road ===
Men

Athlete	Event	Time	Rank
Adolfo Almarza	Time Trial C1-5	52:14.762	31
Adolfo Almarza	Road Race C1-3	2:10:15	12
Claudio Alfaro	Time Trial C1-5	54:17.470	32
Claudio Alfaro	Road Race C1-3	-	14
Sebastián Morales	Time Trial H1-5	37:51.481	9
Sebastián Morales	Road Race H3-5	2:19:18	8
Matías Cayuqueo	Time Trial H1-5	48:19.993	14
Matías Cayuqueo	Road Race H3-5	-	11

Women

Athlete	Event	Time	Rank
Ingrid Venegas	Time Trial C1-5	38:55.645	9
Ingrid Venegas	Road Race C4-5	DNF	

=== Track ===
Men

Athlete	Event	Qualification		Final	
Athlete	Event	Time	Rank	Opposition Time	Rank
Adolfo Almarza	Time Trial C1-5	—N/a		1:19.783	17
Adolfo Almarza	Individual Pursuit C1-3	4:23.096	6	did not advance	
Claudio Alfaro	Time Trial C1-5	—N/a		1:25.269	20
Claudio Alfaro	Individual Pursuit C1-3	4:54.044	10	did not advance	

Women

Athlete	Event	Qualification		Final	
Athlete	Event	Time	Rank	Opposition Time	Rank
Ingrid Venegas	Time Trial C1-5	—N/a		45.337	8
Ingrid Venegas	Individual Pursuit C4-5	4:53.183	6	did not advance	

== Swimming ==
Men

Athlete	Event	Heats		Final	
Athlete	Event	Result	Rank	Result	Rank
Christopher Durán	100m Freestyle S3	—N/a		3:03.64	6
Christopher Durán	200m Freestyle S3	—N/a		6:43.72	5
Christopher Durán	50m Freestyle S3	—N/a		1:26.41	7
Christopher Durán	50m Backstroke S4 (S3)	—N/a		-	-
Eduardo Muñoz	50m Freestyle S12	29.29	8 Q	29.29	8
Eduardo Muñoz	100m Freestyle S12	—N/a		1:05.47	4
Eduardo Muñoz	100m Breaststroke SB12	—N/a		1:24.82	5
Alberto Abarza	200m Freestyle S2 (S1-S2)	—N/a		4:10.06	1st place, gold medalist(s)
Alberto Abarza	50m Backstroke S2 (S1)	58.22	1 Q	58.25	1st place, gold medalist(s)
Alberto Abarza	100m Backstroke S2 (S1)	—N/a		2:05.12	1st place, gold medalist(s)
Alberto Abarza	50m Freestyle S2 (S1)	1:00.32	1 Q	59.10	2nd place, silver medalist(s)
Alberto Abarza	100m Freestyle S2 (S1)	—N/a		2:08.28	2nd place, silver medalist(s)
Vicente Almonacid	100m Breaststroke SB8	—N/a		1:13.14	1st place, gold medalist(s)
Vicente Almonacid	200m Individual Medley SM8	—N/a		2:40.30	2nd place, silver medalist(s)
Vicente Almonacid	50m Freestyle S8	—N/a		29.96	3rd place, bronze medalist(s)

Women

Athlete	Event	Heats		Final	
Athlete	Event	Result	Rank	Result	Rank
Macarena Quero	100m Freestyle S10	1:07.47	3 Q	1:06.81	5
Macarena Quero	50m Freestyle S10	30.18	3 Q	30.34	4
Macarena Quero	100m Breaststroke SB9	—N/a		1:30.66	4
Francisca Castro	100m Freestyle S10	1:11.91	9	did not advance	
Francisca Castro	50m Freestyle S10	32.46	7 Q	32.87	8
Francisca Castro	100m Backstroke S10	—N/a		1:17.82	6
Valentina Muñoz	100m Backstroke S8	—N/a		1:24.60	1st place, gold medalist(s)
Valentina Muñoz	400m Freestyle S8 (S7)	—N/a		5:57.11	4
Valentina Muñoz	100m Freestyle S8	—N/a		1:18.92	4
Kiara Godoy	100m Butterfly S9	—N/a		1:17.43	5
Kiara Godoy	50m Freestyle S9	—N/a		32.17	5
Kiara Godoy	100m Freestyle S9	1:11.24	5 Q	1:10.57	5
Mailyn González	50m Freestyle S9	—N/a		33.91	7
Mailyn González	100m Freestyle S9	1:15.88	8 Q	1:15.89	8

== Powerlifting ==
Men

Athlete	Event	Total lifted	Rank
Javier Jiménez	54 kg	123	5
Juan Garrido Acevedo	59 kg	185	1st place, gold medalist(s)
Jorge Carinao	65 kg	176	2nd place, silver medalist(s)
Cristian Aguirre	72 kg	143	7
Sebastián Castro	80 kg	137	6
Amaro Fica	80 kg	137	7
Frank Feliú	88 kg and 97 kg combined	151.02	5

Women

Athlete	Event	Total lifted	Rank
Camila Campos	55 kg	105	2nd place, silver medalist(s)
Pamela Muñoz	61 kg and 67 kg combined	61.65	3rd place, bronze medalist(s)
María Ortíz	73 kg	109	2nd place, silver medalist(s)
Marion Serrano	79 kg and 86 kg combined	91.85	3rd place, bronze medalist(s)

== Table tennis ==
Men

Athlete	Event	Preliminaries				Quarterfinals	Semifinals	Final / BM	
Athlete	Event	Opposition Result	Opposition Result	Opposition Result	Rank	Opposition Result	Opposition Result	Opposition Result	Rank
Vicente Leiva	Men's singles C1	Bustamante (ARG); L 0-3	Contessi (BRA); L 0-3	Fernández (CUB); L 0-3	4	did not advance			
Luis Flores	Men's singles C2	Rojas (VEN); W 3-0	Espindola (BRA); W 3-0	—N/a	1 Q	Segrest (USA); W 3-0	Costa (BRA); W 3-2	Reyes (MEX); L 2-3	2nd place, silver medalist(s)
Cristian González	Men's singles C4	Espinoza (ESA); W 3-0	Oliveira (BRA); W 3-1	—N/a	1 Q	—N/a	Ank (BRA); W 3-2	Babes (BRA); W 3-0	1st place, gold medalist(s)
Maximiliano Rodríguez	Men's singles C4	Schneider (USA); W 3-0	Ank (BRA); W 3-0	Sandoval (COL); W 3-0	1 Q	Oliveira (BRA); W 3-2	Babes (BRA); L 2-3	did not advance	3rd place, bronze medalist(s)
Cristian Dettoni	Men's singles C6	Torres (CHI); L 1-3	Arguello (CRC); W 3-0	—N/a	2 Q	—N/a	Seidenfeld (USA); L 1-3	did not advance	3rd place, bronze medalist(s)
Ignacio Torres	Men's singles C6	Dettoni (CHI); W 3-1	Arguello (CRC); W 3-0	—N/a	1 Q	—N/a	Pino (CHI); L 1-3	did not advance	3rd place, bronze medalist(s)
Matías Pino	Men's singles C6	Rodrigues (BRA); W 3-0	Seidenfeld (USA); L 2-3	Yañez (PER); W 3-0	2 Q	—N/a	Torres (CHI); W 3-1	Seidenfeld (USA); W 3-0	Disqualified
Gustavo Castro	Men's singles C10	Carbanatti (BRA); W 3-0	Neira (ARG); W 3-0	—N/a	2 Q	Moura (BRA); L 0-3	did not advance		5
Manuel Echaveguren	Men's singles C10	Rivera (PUR); W 3-0	Puerto (COL); W 3-2	Sarfaraz (GUY); W 3-0	1 Q	Moreira (BRA); W 3-0	Carbanatti (BRA); L 0-3	did not advance	3rd place, bronze medalist(s)
Vicente Leiva; Luis Flores	Men's team C1-2	Brazil (BRA); L 1-2	Cuba (CUB); W 2-0	—N/a	2 Q'	—N/a	Argentina (ARG); W 2-0	Brazil (BRA); L 1-2	2nd place, silver medalist(s)
Cristian González; Maximiliano Rodríguez	Men's team C3-5	Peru (PER); W 2-0	United States (USA); W 2-1	Guatemala (GUA); W 2-0	1 Q	Mexico (MEX); W 2-0	Venezuela (VEN); W 1-1	Brazil (BRA); W 2-0	1st place, gold medalist(s)
Cristian Dettoni; Matías Pino	Men's team C6-8	Ecuador (ECU); W 2-0	Canada (CAN); W 3-0	—N/a	1 Q	—N/a	United States (USA); L 0-2	did not advance	Disqualified
Manuel Echaveguren; Gustavo Castro	Men's team C9-10	Brazil (BRA); L 0-2	Puerto Rico (PUR); W 2-0	—N/a	2 Q	—N/a	United States (USA); W 2-0	Brazil (BRA); L 0-1	2nd place, silver medalist(s)

Women

Athlete	Event	Preliminaries				Quarterfinals	Semifinals	Final / BM	
Athlete	Event	Opposition Result	Opposition Result	Opposition Result	Rank	Opposition Result	Opposition Result	Opposition Result	Rank
Tamara Leonelli	Women's singles C5	Da Silva (BRA); W 3-0	Kuell (ARG); W 3-2	Sanchez (COL); W 3-0	—N/a				1st place, gold medalist(s)
Ailyn Espinoza	Women's singles C8-10	Rauen (BRA); L 0-3	Sosa (VEN); W 3-0	—N/a	2 Q	—N/a	Parinos (BRA); L 1-3	did not advance	3rd place, bronze medalist(s)

== Wheelchair basketball ==
Team	Event	Group Stage				Quarterfinal	Semifinal	Final / BM	
Team	Event	Opposition Score	Opposition Score	Opposition Score	Rank	Opposition Score	Opposition Score	Opposition Score	Rank
Chile women's	Women's tournament	United States (USA); L 10-92	Brazil (BRA); L 14-71	Peru (PER); W 33-28	3	did not advance			8

== Wheelchair rugby ==
=== Team roster ===
The mixed team was composed of 11 male athletes and one female athlete.

- Victor Bocaz
- Jeny Barraza
- Jonathan Flores
- Jonatan Alarcón
- Christian Madariaga
- Alexis Barraza
- Piero Arévalo
- Cristopher Flores
- Juan Rodríguez
- Diego Romero (captain)
- Ricardo Díaz
- Francisco Cayulef
- Pablo Benavides (coach)
- Sebastián Caballero (assistant coach)

=== Results ===
Round robin						5/6 Playoff	Rank
Opposition Score	Opposition Score	Opposition Score	Opposition Score	Opposition Score	Rank	Opposition Score	Rank
United States; L 16-60	Colombia; L 26-62	Argentina; L 47-56	Canada; L 34-70	Brazil; L 13-76	6	Argentina; L38-52	6

== Wheelchair tennis ==
Athlete	Event	First round	Second round	Quarterfinals	Semifinals	Final / BM	
Athlete	Event	Opposition Result	Opposition Result	Opposition Result	Opposition Result	Opposition Result	Rank
Alexander Cataldo	Men's singles	—N/a	Apaza (PER); W 6–1, 6-1	Ratzlaff (USA); L 3–6, 3-6	did not advance		5
Diego Pérez	Men's singles	Perez (ESA); W 6–2, 6-1	—N/a	Rodrigues (BRA); L 0–6, 1-6	did not advance		5
Alexander Cataldo; Diego Pérez	Men's doubles	—N/a	—N/a	Oquendo / Sanchez (COL); W 4–6, 6-0	Fernandez / Ledesma (ARG); L 1–6, 0-6	Carneiro / Rodrigues (BRA); W 3–6, 3-6	3rd place, bronze medalist(s)
Pablo Araya	Quad singles	—N/a	—N/a	Shaw (CAN); L 1–6, 1-6	did not advance		5
Sofia Fuentes	Women's singles	Castillo (PER); L 4–6, 3-6	—N/a	did not advance			9
Macarena Cabrillana	Women's singles	—N/a	—N/a	Duval (BRA); W 7–6, 6-3	Kaiser (USA); W 6–2, 3–6, 6-3	Bernal (COL); L 2–6, 2-6	2nd place, silver medalist(s)
Sofia Fuentes; Macarena Cabrillana	Women's doubles	—N/a	—N/a	Dhers / Moreno (ARG); L 4–6, 3-6	did not advance		5
