= Table tennis at the 2019 Parapan American Games =

- Venue: Lima
- Dates: 22–27 August
- Competitors: 127 from 19 nations

Table tennis at the 2019 Parapan American Games was held in Lima, Peru. The winners of all single competitions qualified for the 2020 Summer Paralympics.

Matias Pino lost his medals due to a doping violation where he was found to have taken the stimulant octopamine on 24 August 2019, a banned substance in the World Anti-Doping Agency's 2019 Prohibited List. His gold medal was awarded to original silver medalist Ian Seidenfeld who also gained Pino's slot allocation for the 2020 Summer Paralympics and the results for the Chilean men's team class 6-8 led to a disqualification and their bronze medal stripped off.

== Participating nations ==
There will be 128 table tennis players from 19 nations competing.

- Argentina (14)
- Brazil (31)
- Canada (5)
- Chile (11)
- Colombia (8)
- Costa Rica (5)
- Cuba (4)
- Dominican Republic (1)
- Ecuador (3)
- El Salvador (4)
- Guatemala (2)
- Guyana (1)
- Mexico (6)
- Peru (4) (Host country)
- Puerto Rico (2)
- Trinidad and Tobago (1)
- Uruguay (1)
- United States (14)
- Venezuela (11)

== Medal table ==
* Host nation (Peru)

Rank	NPC	Gold	Silver	Bronze	Total
1	Brazil (BRA)	9	6	9	24
2	Chile (CHI)	3	3	5	11
3	Mexico (MEX)	3	3	0	6
4	Argentina (ARG)	2	3	6	11
5	United States (USA)	2	3	1	6
6	Cuba (CUB)	1	0	2	3
7	Costa Rica (CRC)	0	1	0	1
8	Colombia (COL)	0	0	6	6
9	Venezuela (VEN)	0	0	4	4
10	Canada (CAN)	0	0	2	2
Totals (10 entries)		20	19	35	74

== Medalists ==
=== Men's events ===
Event	Gold	Silver	Bronze
Men's singles C1	Yunier Fernández; Cuba	Aloísio Junior; Brazil	Conrado Contessi; Brazil
Men's singles C1	Yunier Fernández; Cuba	Aloísio Junior; Brazil	Fernando Eberhardt; Argentina
Men's singles C2	Víctor Reyes; Mexico	Luis Flores; Chile	Iranildo Espíndola; Brazil
Men's singles C2	Víctor Reyes; Mexico	Luis Flores; Chile	Guilherme Marcião; Brazil
Men's singles C3	Gabriel Copola; Argentina	Jenson Van Emburgh; United States	Welder Knaf; Brazil
Men's singles C3	Gabriel Copola; Argentina	Jenson Van Emburgh; United States	Roberto Quijada; Venezuela
Men's singles C4	Cristián González; Chile	Eziquiel Babes; Brazil	Maximiliano Rodríguez; Chile
Men's singles C4	Cristián González; Chile	Eziquiel Babes; Brazil	Alexandre Ank; Brazil
Men's singles C5	Mauro Depergola; Argentina	Ahad Sarand; United States	Elias Romero; Argentina
Men's singles C5	Mauro Depergola; Argentina	Ahad Sarand; United States	Daniel Rodriguez; Argentina
Men's singles C6	Ian Seidenfeld; United States	None	Ignacio Torres; Chile
Men's singles C6	Ian Seidenfeld; United States	None	Cristian Dettoni; Chile
Men's singles C7	Paulo Salmin; Brazil	Aleksey Kaniuka; Argentina	Jose Vargas; Colombia
Men's singles C8	Luiz Manara; Brazil	Steven Roman; Costa Rica	Ian Kent; Canada
Men's singles C8	Luiz Manara; Brazil	Steven Roman; Costa Rica	Diego Henao; Colombia
Men's singles C9	Tahl Leibovitz; United States	Miguel Vazquez; Mexico	Ramon da Silva; Brazil
Men's singles C9	Tahl Leibovitz; United States	Miguel Vazquez; Mexico	Lucas Carvalho; Brazil
Men's singles C10	Carlos Carbinatti; Brazil	Claudio Massad; Brazil	Manuel Echaveguren; Chile
Men's singles C10	Carlos Carbinatti; Brazil	Claudio Massad; Brazil	Erich Manso; Cuba
Men's team C1-2	Brazil (BRA); Guilherme Costa; Iranildo Espindola; Aloisio Junior	Chile (CHI); Luis Flores; Vicente Leiva	Venezuela (VEN); Gregory Moreno; Luis Rojas
Men's team C1-2	Brazil (BRA); Guilherme Costa; Iranildo Espindola; Aloisio Junior	Chile (CHI); Luis Flores; Vicente Leiva	Argentina (ARG); Guillermo Bustamante; Fernando Eberhardt
Men's team C3-5	Chile (CHI); Cristián González; Maximiliano Rodríguez	Brazil (BRA); Eziquiel Babes; David Freitas; Welder Knaf	Venezuela (VEN); Roberto Quijada; Noel Sandoval
Men's team C3-5	Chile (CHI); Cristián González; Maximiliano Rodríguez	Brazil (BRA); Eziquiel Babes; David Freitas; Welder Knaf	Argentina (ARG); Gabriel Copola; Mauro Depergola; Elias Romero
Men's team C6-8	Brazil (BRA); Luiz Manara; Francisco Wellington de Melo; Paulo Salmin	United States (USA); Marco Makkar; Ian Seidenfeld	Colombia (COL); Diego Henao; Jose Vargas
Men's team C9-10	Brazil (BRA); Carlos Carbinatti; Diego Moreira; Claudio Massad	Chile (CHI); Gustavo Castro; Manuel Echaveguren	United States (USA); Tahl Leibovitz; Randall Medcalf; Jerry Vasquez
Men's team C9-10	Brazil (BRA); Carlos Carbinatti; Diego Moreira; Claudio Massad	Chile (CHI); Gustavo Castro; Manuel Echaveguren	Colombia (COL); Julian Chinchilla; Diego Jimenez; Alvaro Puerto

=== Women's events ===
Event	Gold	Silver	Bronze
Women's singles C2-3	Maria Sigala; Mexico	Marliane Santos; Brazil	Cátia Oliveira; Brazil
Women's singles C2-3	Maria Sigala; Mexico	Marliane Santos; Brazil	Yanelis Silva; Cuba
Women's singles C4	Joyce de Oliveira; Brazil	Martha Verdin; Mexico	Manuela Guapi; Colombia
Women's singles C4	Joyce de Oliveira; Brazil	Martha Verdin; Mexico	Yoleidy Fernandez; Venezuela
Women's singles C5	Tamara Leonelli; Chile	Nayla Kuell; Argentina	Bronze not awarded as only 4 athletes entered
Women's singles C7	Claudia Perez Villalba; Mexico	Giselle Muñoz; Argentina	Stephanie Chan; Canada
Women's singles C8-10	Danielle Rauen; Brazil	Jennyfer Marques Parinos; Brazil	Lethicia Lacerda; Brazil
Women's singles C8-10	Danielle Rauen; Brazil	Jennyfer Marques Parinos; Brazil	Ailyn Espinoza; Chile
Women's team C2-5	Brazil (BRA); Joyce de Oliveira; Marliane Santos; Thais Severo	Mexico (MEX); Maria Sigala; Martha Verdin	Argentina (ARG); Verónica Blanco; Maria Garrone; Nayla Kuell
Women's team C2-5	Brazil (BRA); Joyce de Oliveira; Marliane Santos; Thais Severo	Mexico (MEX); Maria Sigala; Martha Verdin	Colombia (COL); Manuela Guapi; Nelly Sanchez

== See also ==
- Table tennis at the 2019 Pan American Games
- Table tennis at the 2020 Summer Paralympics
