= Venues of the 2019 Pan American and Parapan American Games =

Sports venues in Lima, Peru

The following is the list of venues for the 2019 Pan American Games and 2019 Parapan American Games held in Lima, Peru and surrounding cities from July 26 to August 11, 2019 and from August 23 to September 1, 2019 respectively.

== Venues ==
=== Ceremonies Venue ===
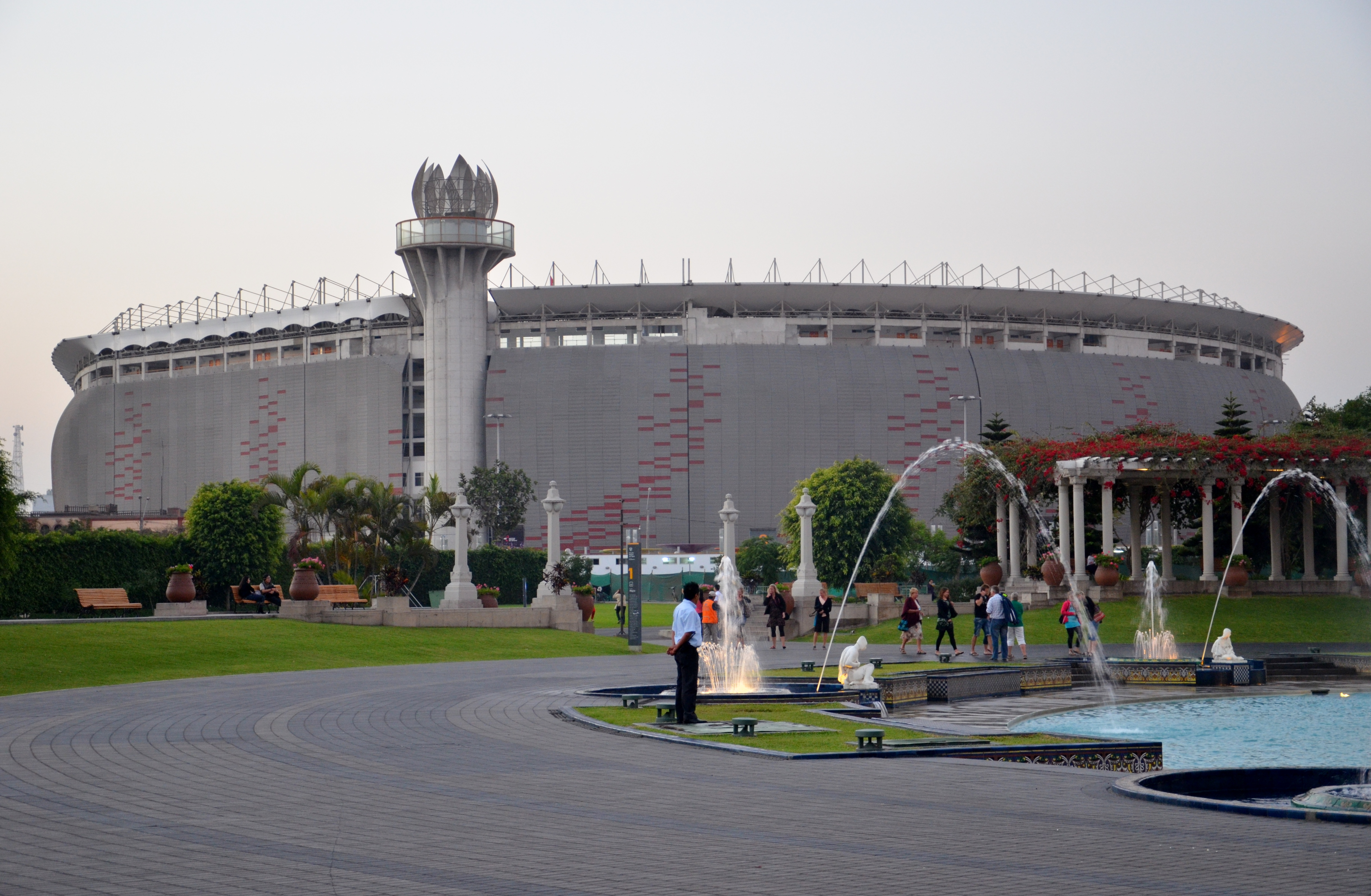
The Estadio Nacional is scheduled to host the opening and closing ceremonies

Venue	Sports		Capacity	Ref.
Venue	Pan American Games	Parapan American Games	Capacity	Ref.
Estadio Nacional del Perú	Ceremonies	Opening ceremony	45,000	

=== Cluster A ===
==== Villa Deportiva Regional del Callao ====
Venue	Sports		Capacity	Ref.
Venue	Pan American Games	Parapan American Games	Capacity	Ref.
Miguel Grau Coliseum	Boxing; Wrestling	Goalball	2,633	
Polideportivo Callao	Taekwondo; Volleyball	Taekwondo; Sitting volleyball	5,341	
Racquetball courts	Racquetball		TBC	

==== San Miguel ====
Venue	Sports		Capacity	Ref.
Venue	Pan American Games	Parapan American Games	Capacity	Ref.
Circuito San Miguel	Cycling (road)	Cycling (road)	TBC	
Estadio de Volley de Playa	Beach volleyball		3,000	
Circuito BMX	Cycling (BMX)		3,000	
Pista de skateboarding	Cycling (BMX freestyle); Roller sports (skateboarding)		2,500	
Pista de Patinaje	Roller sports (speed)		1,000	

==== Stand alone ====
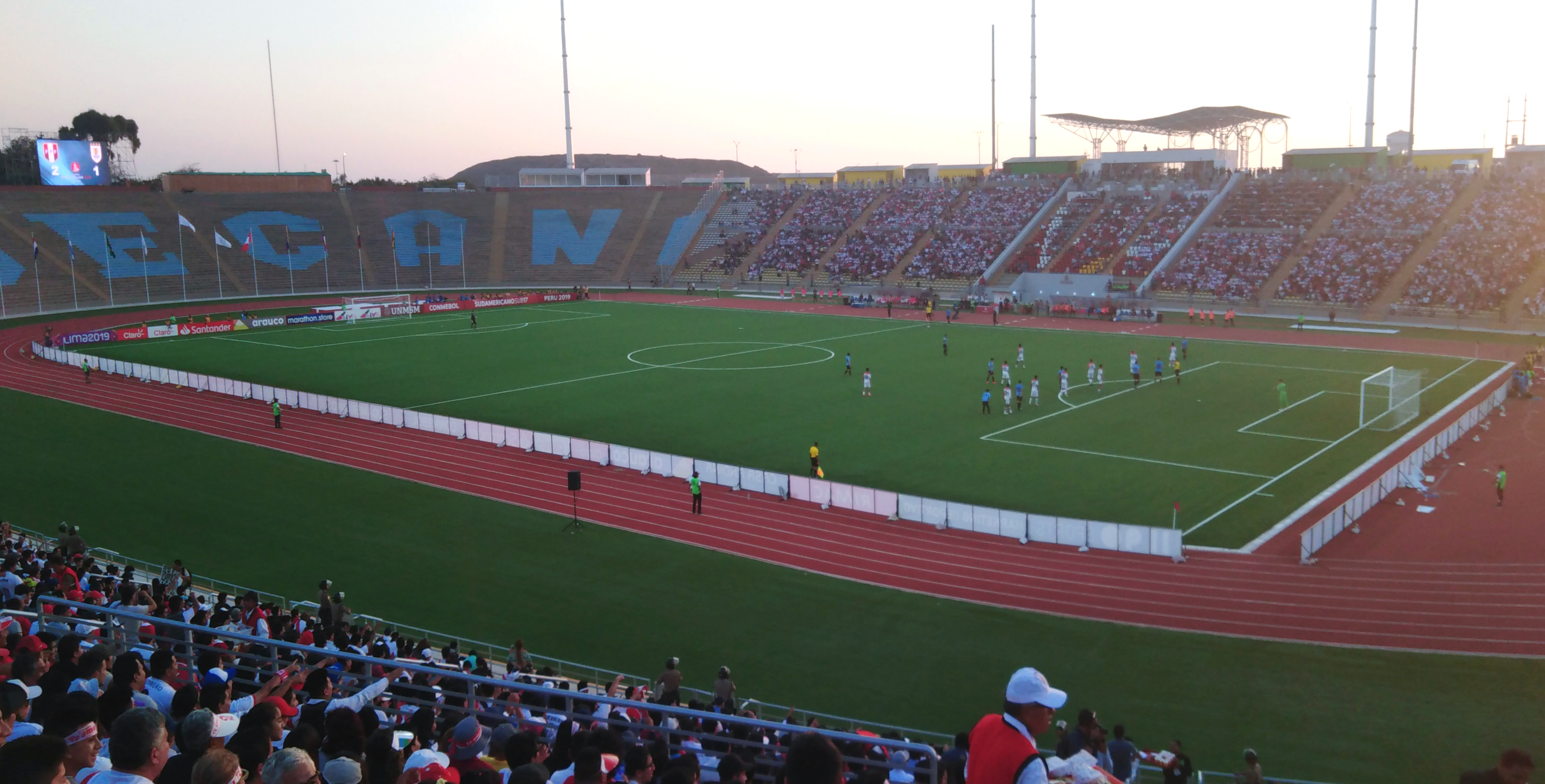
The Estadio Universidad San Marcos is scheduled to host the football competitions

Venue	Sports		Capacity	Ref.
Venue	Pan American Games	Parapan American Games	Capacity	Ref.
Estadio Universidad San Marcos	Football		32,000	

=== Cluster B ===
==== Villa Deportiva Nacional Videna ====
Venue	Sports		Capacity	Ref.
Venue	Pan American Games	Parapan American Games	Capacity	Ref.
Athletic Stadium	Athletics	Athletics, closing ceremony	10,000	
Aquatic Centre	Artistic swimming Diving; Swimming	Swimming	5,000	
Bowling Centre	Bowling		200	
CAR Voleibol en la Videna	Squash		TBD	
Polideportivo 1	Handball; Judo	Wheelchair basketball	2,300	
Polideportivo 2		Judo; Powerlifting	1,100	
Polideportivo 3	Badminton; Roller sports (figure); Table tennis	Badminton; Table tennis	860	
Velodrome	Cycling (track)	Cycling (track)	2,300	

==== Stand alone ====
Venue	Sports		Capacity	Ref.
Venue	Pan American Games	Parapan American Games	Capacity	Ref.
Coliseo Eduardo Dibos	Basketball		4,600	
Equestrian Club Militar La Molina (Army Equestrian School)	Equestrian		3,000	
Parque Kennedy (Kennedy Park)	Athletics (marathons/walks)		TBC	

=== Cluster C ===
==== Villa María del Triunfo ====
Venue	Sports		Capacity	Ref.
Venue	Pan American Games	Parapan American Games	Capacity	Ref.
Baseball field	Baseball		3,000	
Hockey field	Field hockey	Football 5-a-side	2,000	
Canchas de Pelota Vasca	Basque Pelota		550	
Rugby field	Archery; Rugby sevens	Football 7-a-side	2,500	
Softball field	Softball		2,000	
Aquatic Centre	Water polo		2,000	

==== Escuela Militar de Chorrilos ====
Venue	Sports		Capacity	Ref.
Venue	Pan American Games	Parapan American Games	Capacity	Ref.
Coliseo Mariscal Caceres	Bodybuilding; Weightlifting		TBC	
Escuela Militar de Chorrilos	Modern pentathlon		1,000	

==== Stand alone ====
Venue	Sports		Capacity	Ref.
Venue	Pan American Games	Parapan American Games	Capacity	Ref.
Agua Dulce	Triathlon		1,000	
Club Lawn Tennis de La Exposcicion	Tennis	Wheelchair tennis	TBC	
Golf Club San Isidro	Golf		TBC	
Las Palmas Air Base	Shooting	Shooting	1,100	
Lima Convention Centre	Fencing; Modern pentathlon (fencing)		TBC	
Morro Solar	Cycling (mountain biking)		1,000	

=== Cluster D ===
Venue	Sports		Capacity	Ref.
Venue	Pan American Games	Parapan American Games	Capacity	Ref.
Polideportivo Villa El Salvador	Gymnastics; Karate	Boccia; Wheelchair rugby	4,600	

=== Venues outside of Lima ===
Venue	City	Sports		Capacity	Ref.
Venue	City	Pan American Games	Parapan American Games	Capacity	Ref.
Albufera Medio Mundo	Huacho	Canoeing (sprint); Rowing		TBC	
Laguna Bujama	Mala	Swimming (open water); Water skiing		1,000	
Rio Canete	Lunahuaná	Canoeing (slalom)		1,000	
Yacht Club Peruano	Paracas	Sailing		TBC	
Punta Rocas	Punta Negra	Surfing		1,600	
