= Canada at the 2019 Parapan American Games =

- Flag of Canada
- IPC code: CAN
- NPC: Canadian Paralympic Committee

in Lima, Peru August 23, 2019 – September 1, 2019
- Competitors: 152 in 13 sports
- Flag bearers: Stephanie Chan (Opening); Carla Shibley and Meghan Lemiski (Closing)
- Medals Ranked 6th: Gold 14 Silver 16 Bronze 15 Total 45

Parapan American Games appearances (overview)
- 1999; 2003; 2007; 2011; 2015; 2019; 2023

Canada participated in the 2019 Parapan American Games in Lima, Peru from August 23 to September 1, 2019.

== Medalists ==
| Medal | Name | Sport | Event |
|---|---|---|---|
| Gold | Nathan Riech | Athletics | Men's 1500m T38 |
| Gold | Guillaume Ouellet | Athletics | Men's 5000m T13 |
| Gold | Jennifer Brown | Athletics | Women's discus throw F38 |
| Gold | Pascal Lapointe; Olivia Meier | Badminton | Mixed doubles SL1-SU5 |
| Gold | Marco Dispaltro | Boccia | Individual BC4 |
| Gold | Carla Shibley | Cycling | Women's road race B |
| Gold | Matthew Kinnie | Cycling | Mixed time trial H1-5 |
| Gold | Annie Bouchard | Cycling | Women's 1 km time trial B |
| Gold | Carla Shibley | Cycling | Women's individual pursuit B |
| Gold | Nicholas Bennett | Swimming | Men's 200m freestyle S14 |
| Gold | Nicholas Bennett | Swimming | Men's 100m breaststroke SB14 |
| Gold | Nicholas Bennett | Swimming | Men's 200m individual medley SM14 |
| Gold | Tyson MacDonald | Swimming | Men's 100m backstroke S14 |
| Gold | Angela Marina | Swimming | Women's 200m freestyle S14 |
| Gold | Angela Marina | Swimming | Women's 100m butterfly S14 |
| Gold | Women's team | Wheelchair basketball | Women's tournament |
| Gold | Robert Shaw | Wheelchair tennis | Quads' singles |
| Silver | Zachary Gingras | Athletics | Men's 400m T38 |
| Silver | Liam Stanley | Athletics | Men's 1500m T38 |
| Silver | Greg Stewart | Athletics | Men's shot put F46 |
| Silver | Yuka Chokyu | Badminton | Women's singles WH2 |
| Silver | Olivia Meier | Badminton | Women's singles SU5 |
| Silver | Annie Bouchard | Cycling | Women's road race B |
| Silver | Lowell Taylor | Cycling | Mixed time trial B |
| Silver | Lowell Taylor | Cycling | Men's individual pursuit B |
| Silver | Carla Shibley | Cycling | Women's 1 km time trial B |
| Silver | Annie Bouchard | Cycling | Women's individual pursuit B |
| Silver | Marie-Claude Molnar | Cycling | Women's individual pursuit C4-5 |
| Silver | Priscilla Gagné | Judo | Women's -52 kg |
| Silver | Patrick Waters | Swimming | Men's 100m breaststroke SB9 |
| Silver | Nicholas Bennett | Swimming | Men's 100m butterfly S14 |
| Silver | Tyson MacDonald | Swimming | Men's 200m individual medley SM14 |
| Silver | Krystal Shaw | Swimming | Women's 50m freestyle S7 |
| Silver | Krystal Shaw | Swimming | Women's 100m freestyle S7 |
| Silver | Krystal Shaw | Swimming | Women's 100m backstroke S7 |
| Silver | Angela Marina | Swimming | Women's 100m backstroke S14 |
| Silver | Men's team | Wheelchair basketball | Men's tournament |
| Silver | Mixed team | Wheelchair rugby | Mixed tournament |
| Bronze | Liam Stanley | Athletics | Men's 400m T37 |
| Bronze | Pascal Lapointe | Badminton | Men's singles SL4 |
| Bronze | Bernard Lapointe; Richard Peter | Badminton | Men's doubles WH1-WH2 |
| Bronze | Eric Bussiere; Philipp Lord; Marylou Martineau | Boccia | Pairs BC3 |
| Bronze | Iulian Ciobanu; Marco Dispaltro; Alison Levine | Boccia | Pairs BC4 |
| Bronze | Michael Shetler | Cycling | Mixed road race T1-2 |
| Bronze | Carla Shibley | Cycling | Mixed time trial B |
| Bronze | Michael Shetler | Cycling | Mixed time trial T1-2 |
| Bronze | Aron Ghebreyohanes; Bruno Haché; Blair Nesbitt; Peter Parsons; Douglas Ripley; Ahmad Zeividavi | Goalball | Men's team |
| Bronze | Whitney Bogart; Amy Burk; Roby Hammad; Meghan Mahon; Emma Reinke; Maryam Salehizadeh | Goalball | Women's team |
| Bronze | Men's team | Sitting volleyball | Men's tournament |
| Bronze | Women's team | Sitting volleyball | Women's tournament |
| Bronze | Tyson MacDonald | Swimming | Men's 200m freestyle S14 |
| Bronze | Arianna Hunsicker | Swimming | Women's 50m freestyle S10 |
| Bronze | Arianna Hunsicker | Swimming | Women's 400m freestyle S10 |
| Bronze | Myriam Soliman | Swimming | Women's 100m backstroke S6 |
| Bronze | Arianna Hunsicker | Swimming | Women's 100m backstroke S10 |
| Bronze | Emma Van Dyk | Swimming | Women's 100m butterfly S14 |
| Bronze | Arianna Hunsicker | Swimming | Women's 200m individual medley SM10 |
| Bronze | Colleen Cloetta; Arianna Hunsicker; Krystal Shaw; Michelle Tovizi | Swimming | Women's 4 × 100 m medley relay |
| Bronze | Ian Kent | Table tennis | Men's singles C8 |
| Bronze | Stephanie Chan | Table tennis | Women's singles C7 |

== Athletics ==
Men's track

| Athlete | Event | Heats | | Final | |
| Athlete | Event | Result | Rank | Result | Rank |
|---|---|---|---|---|---|
| Michael Barber | 400m T20 | 54.15 | 5 | did not advance | |
| Michael Barber | 1500m T20 | —N/a | | 4:19.52 | 6 |
| Benjamin Brown | 400m T53 | —N/a | | 56.94 | 6 |
| Benjamin Brown | 1500m T54 | —N/a | | 3:33.24 | 9 |
| Mitchell Chase | 1500m T38 | —N/a | | 4:32.41 | 5 |
| Gaerrisen Freeland | 400m T20 | 54.62 | 6 | did not advance | |
| Zachary Gingras | 400m T38 | —N/a | | 53.16 | 2nd place, silver medalist(s) |
| David Johnson | 100m T12 | 12.08 | 3 | did not advance | |
| David Johnson | 400m T12 | 53.85 | 4 | did not advance | |
| Michael Johnstone | 100m T37 | —N/a | | 14.65 | 8 |
| Thomas Normandeau | 400m T47 | 52.09 | 3 Q | 51.86 | 6 |
| Guillaume Ouellet | 1500m T13 | —N/a | | 4:07.56 | 4 |
| Guillaume Ouellet | 5000m T13 | —N/a | | 15:08.68 | 1st place, gold medalist(s) |
| Nathan Riech | 1500m T38 | —N/a | | 4:03.72 | 1st place, gold medalist(s) |
| Liam Stanley | 400m T37 | 55.47 | 2 Q | 55.22 | 3rd place, bronze medalist(s) |
| Liam Stanley | 1500m T38 | —N/a | | 4:12.13 PR | 2nd place, silver medalist(s) |
| Kyle Whitehouse | 100m T38 | —N/a | | 11.97 | 4 |

Men's field

| Athlete | Event | Final | |
| Athlete | Event | Result | Rank |
|---|---|---|---|
| David Bambrick | Discus throw F37 | 33.99 | 4 |
| Gaerrisen Freeland | Long jump T20 | 5.34 | 6 |
| Michael Johnstone | Long jump T37 | 4.34 | 8 |
| Alister McQueen | Javelin throw F64 | 51.69 | 5 |
| Harrison Orpe | Shot put F32/33/34 | 6.68 | 5 |
| Gregory Stewart | Shot put F46 | 14.96 | 2nd place, silver medalist(s) |

Women's track

| Athlete | Event | Heats | | Final | |
| Athlete | Event | Result | Rank | Result | Rank |
|---|---|---|---|---|---|
| Amanda Rummery | 100m T47 | 13.97 | 5 | did not advance | |
| Amanda Rummery | 200m T47 | 28.14 | 5 | did not advance | |
| Amanda Rummery | 400m T47 | 1:03.39 | 2 Q | 1:03.34 | 6 |

Women's field

| Athlete | Event | Final | |
| Athlete | Event | Result | Rank |
|---|---|---|---|
| Jennifer Brown | Discus throw F38 | 29.35 | 1st place, gold medalist(s) |
| Martha Gustafson | Discus throw F53 | 8.58 | 3rd place, bronze medalist(s) |
| Ljiljana Ljubisic | Discus throw F11 | 27.08 | 4 |
| Sarah Mickey | Discus throw F55 | 21.38 | 4 |
| Sarah Mickey | Javelin throw F56 | DNS | |
| Amy Watt | Long jump T47 | 4.66 | 6 |
| Madison Wilson-Walker | Long jump T42-44/T61-63 | 3.89 | 4 |

== Badminton ==
Canada have secured seven quotas in badminton.

=== Men ===
| Athlete | Event | Preliminaries | | | Semifinals | Final / BM | |
| Athlete | Event | Opposition Result | Opposition Result | Rank | Opposition Result | Opposition Result | Rank |
|---|---|---|---|---|---|---|---|
| William Roussy | Singles SL3 | Zuffo (BRA); L 1–2 | Franco (VEN); W 2–0 | 2 Q | Zuffo (BRA); L 1–2 | Bello (CUB); L 0–2 | 4 |
| Pascal Lapointe | Singles SL4 | Oliveira (BRA); L 0–2 | Alvarado (VEN); W 2–0 | 2 Q | Anguiano (GUA); L 0–2 | Cueto (PER); W 2–0 | 3rd place, bronze medalist(s) |
| Wyatt Lightfoot | Singles SS6 | Abarca (CHI); W 2–0 | Krajewski (USA); L 1–2 | 2 Q | Krajewski (USA); L 0–2 | Salva (PER); L 1–2 | 4 |
| Bernard Lapointe; Richard Peter | Doubles WH1/WH2 | Cano / Soares (BRA); L 0–2 | Fajardo / Miranda (PER); W 2–0 | 2 Q | Conceicao / Godoy (BRA); L 0–2 | Aranguiz / Cancino (CHI); W 2–1 | 3rd place, bronze medalist(s) |

=== Women ===
| Athlete | Event | Preliminaries | | | | | Semifinals | Final / BM | |
| Athlete | Event | Opposition Result | Opposition Result | Opposition Result | Opposition Result | Rank | Opposition Result | Opposition Result | Rank |
|---|---|---|---|---|---|---|---|---|---|
| Yuka Chokyu | Singles WH2 | Souza (BRA); W 2–0 | Jimeno (CHI); W 2–0 | —N/a | | 1 Q | Souza (BRA); W 2–1 | Jauregui (PER); L 2–0 | 2nd place, silver medalist(s) |
| Olivia Meier | Singles SU5 | Lanes (CUB); W 2–0 | Almeida (BRA); L 0–2 | Ventocilla (PER); W 2–0 | Puntriano (PER); W 2–0 | —N/a | | | 2nd place, silver medalist(s) |

=== Mixed doubles ===
| Athlete | Event | Preliminaries | | | | |
| Athlete | Event | Opposition Result | Opposition Result | Opposition Result | Opposition Result | Rank |
|---|---|---|---|---|---|---|
| Pascal Lapointe; Olivia Meier | Doubles SL3-SU5 | Cueto / Ventocilla (PER); W 2–0 | Almeida / Rosso (BRA); W 2–0 | Bello / Lanes (CUB); W 2–0 | Cavalli / Silva (BRA); W 2–1 | 1st place, gold medalist(s) |

== Boccia ==
Canada have secured seven quotas in boccia.

| Athlete | Event | Preliminaries | | | Quarterfinals | Semifinals | Final | |
| Athlete | Event | Opponent | Opposition Score | Rank | Opposition Score | Opposition Score | Opposition Score | Rank |
|---|---|---|---|---|---|---|---|---|
| Hanif Mawji | Individual BC1 | Flores (ARG) | L 1–6 | 3 | did not advance | | | |
| Hanif Mawji | Individual BC1 | Desilva-Andrade (BER) | W 6–2 | 3 | did not advance | | | |
| Hanif Mawji | Individual BC1 | Sanchez (MEX) | L 1–7 | 3 | did not advance | | | |
| Éric Bussière | Individual BC3 | Soto Fajardo (PER) | W 11–0 | 2 Q | Romero (COL); L 0–7 | did not advance | | |
| Éric Bussière | Individual BC3 | Ferrando (ARG) | L 2–5 | 2 Q | Romero (COL); L 0–7 | did not advance | | |
| Philippe Lord | Individual BC3 | Losley Tánchez (GUA) | W 9–1 | 2 | did not advance | | | |
| Philippe Lord | Individual BC3 | Ruiz (ARG) | L 1–4 | 2 | did not advance | | | |
| Marylou Martineau | Individual BC3 | Romero (COL) | L 1–8 | 2 | did not advance | | | |
| Marylou Martineau | Individual BC3 | Anzalas (ARG) | W 5–3 | 2 | did not advance | | | |
| Iulian Ciobanu | Individual BC4 | Profiti (ARG) | W 9–0 | 2 Q | Levine (CAN); W 7–0 | Dispaltro (CAN); L 1–7 | Cely (COL); L 3–5 | 4 |
| Iulian Ciobanu | Individual BC4 | Grisales (COL) | L 3–5 | 2 Q | Levine (CAN); W 7–0 | Dispaltro (CAN); L 1–7 | Cely (COL); L 3–5 | 4 |
| Marco Dispaltro | Individual BC4 | M dos Santos (BRA) | L 2–4 | 2 Q | Laurinda (BRA); W 3–2 | Ciobanu (CAN); W 7–1 | Grisales (COL); W 11–2 | 1st place, gold medalist(s) |
| Marco Dispaltro | Individual BC4 | E dos Santos (BRA) | W 5–1 | 2 Q | Laurinda (BRA); W 3–2 | Ciobanu (CAN); W 7–1 | Grisales (COL); W 11–2 | 1st place, gold medalist(s) |
| Alison Levine | Individual BC4 | Chica (COL) | W 11–1 | 1 Q | Ciobanu (CAN); L 0–7 | did not advance | | |
| Alison Levine | Individual BC4 | Manuel (MEX) | L 2–5 | 1 Q | Ciobanu (CAN); L 0–7 | did not advance | | |
| Éric Bussière; Philippe Lord; Marylou Martineau | Pairs BC3 | Argentina (ARG) | W 4*–4 | —N/a | | | | 3rd place, bronze medalist(s) |
| Éric Bussière; Philippe Lord; Marylou Martineau | Pairs BC3 | Colombia (COL) | L 3–3* | —N/a | | | | 3rd place, bronze medalist(s) |
| Éric Bussière; Philippe Lord; Marylou Martineau | Pairs BC3 | Brazil (BRA) | L 3–4 | —N/a | | | | 3rd place, bronze medalist(s) |
| Iulian Ciobanu; Marco Dispaltro; Alison Levine | Pairs BC4 | Brazil (BRA) | L 2–4 | —N/a | | | | 3rd place, bronze medalist(s) |
| Iulian Ciobanu; Marco Dispaltro; Alison Levine | Pairs BC4 | Mexico (MEX) | W 10–0 | —N/a | | | | 3rd place, bronze medalist(s) |
| Iulian Ciobanu; Marco Dispaltro; Alison Levine | Pairs BC4 | Colombia (COL) | L 1–4 | —N/a | | | | 3rd place, bronze medalist(s) |

== Cycling ==
=== Road ===
Men

| Athlete | Event | Time | Rank |
|---|---|---|---|
| Lowell Taylor | Road race B | 2:28:05 | 4 |
| Lowell Taylor | Time trial B | 39:46.208 | 2nd place, silver medalist(s) |
| Michael Kinnie | Time trial H1-5 | 31:17.880 | 1st place, gold medalist(s) |
| Patrick Desnoyers | Road race H3-5 | 2:12:23 | 6 |
| Patrick Desnoyers | Time trial H1-5 | 34:12.978 | 7 |
| Rico Morneau | Road race H3-5 | 2:07:03 | 4 |
| Rico Morneau | Time trial H1-5 | 32:46.147 | 4 |
| Michael Shetler | Road race T1-2 | 35:36 | 3rd place, bronze medalist(s) |
| Michael Shetler | Time trial T1-2 | 34:18.338 | 3rd place, bronze medalist(s) |

Women

| Athlete | Event | Time | Rank |
|---|---|---|---|
| Annie Bouchard | Road race B | 2:34:53 | 2nd place, silver medalist(s) |
| Annie Bouchard | Time trial B | 41:52.109 | 6 |
| Carla Shibley | Road race B | 2:33:16 | 1st place, gold medalist(s) |
| Carla Shibley | Time trial B | 40:19.348 | 3rd place, bronze medalist(s) |
| Marie-Claude Molnar | Road race C4-5 | 1:46:11 | 5 |
| Marie-Claude Molnar | Time trial C1-5 | 31:00.537 | 4 |

=== Track ===
Men

| Athlete | Event | Qualification | | Final | |
| Athlete | Event | Time | Rank | Opposition Time | Rank |
|---|---|---|---|---|---|
| Lowell Taylor | Individual pursuit B | 4:28.917 | 2 Q | 4:30.560 | 2nd place, silver medalist(s) |
| Lowell Taylor | Time trial B | —N/a | | 1:08.231 | 4 |

Women

| Athlete | Event | Qualification | | Final | |
| Athlete | Event | Time | Rank | Opposition Time | Rank |
|---|---|---|---|---|---|
| Annie Bouchard | Individual pursuit B | 3:53.028 | 2 Q | 3:51.036 | 2nd place, silver medalist(s) |
| Annie Bouchard | Time trial B | —N/a | | 1:15.310 | 1st place, gold medalist(s) |
| Carla Shibley | Individual pursuit B | 3:52.030 | 1 Q | 3:50.575 | 1st place, gold medalist(s) |
| Carla Shibley | Time trial B | —N/a | | 1:16.132 | 2nd place, silver medalist(s) |
| Marie-Claude Molnar | Individual pursuit C4-5 | 4:09.802 | 2 Q | OVL | 2nd place, silver medalist(s) |
| Marie-Claude Molnar | Time trial C1-5 | —N/a | | 42.612 | 7 |

== Goalball ==
| Team | Event | Group Stage | | | | | | Quarterfinal | Semifinal | Final / BM | |
| Team | Event | Opposition Score | Opposition Score | Opposition Score | Opposition Score | Opposition Score | Rank | Opposition Score | Opposition Score | Opposition Score | Rank |
|---|---|---|---|---|---|---|---|---|---|---|---|
| Canada's men | Men's tournament | United States (USA); W 10–5 | Peru (PER); W 11–1 | Venezuela (VEN); W 13–14 | —N/a | | 1 Q | Argentina (ARG); W 6–3 | United States (USA); L 4–6 | Venezuela (VEN); W 13–11 | 3rd place, bronze medalist(s) |
| Canada's women | Women's tournament | Brazil (BRA); L 3–9 | Peru (PER); W 13–3 | Costa Rica (CRC); W 10–0 | Mexico (MEX); W 14–4 | United States (USA); L 4–3 | 3 Q | —N/a | Brazil (BRA); L 3–4 | Mexico (MEX); W 10–0 | 3rd place, bronze medalist(s) |

== Judo ==
Two judoka have secured quotas.

Men

| Athlete | Event | Preliminary | Quarterfinals | Semifinals | Repechage round 1 | Repechage round 2 | Final/ Bronze medal contest |
| Athlete | Event | Opposition Result | Opposition Result | Opposition Result | Opposition Result | Opposition Result | Opposition Result |
|---|---|---|---|---|---|---|---|
| Justin Karn | Men's -60kg | Bye | Pérez (CUB); L 0000–0010 | —N/a | | Aburto (MEX); W 1001–0002 | Marques (BRA); L 00S1-01S1 |

Women

| Athlete | Event | Round robin | | | | Rank |
| Athlete | Event | Opposition Result | Opposition Result | Opposition Result | Opposition Result | Rank |
|---|---|---|---|---|---|---|
| Priscilla Gagne | Women's -52kg | Pereira (BRA); L 0000–0010 | Cardoso (BRA); W 0010-00S1 | Ledesma (ARG); W 0011–0000 | Gomez (ARG); W 0010–0000 | 2nd place, silver medalist(s) |

== Swimming ==
=== Men ===
| Athlete | Event | Heats | | Final | |
| Athlete | Event | Result | Rank | Result | Rank |
|---|---|---|---|---|---|
| Caleb Arndt | 50m freestyle S13 | 29.05 | 6 Q | 28.62 | 7 |
| Caleb Arndt | 100m freestyle S13 | 1:04.23 | 8 Q | 1:03.45 | 8 |
| Caleb Arndt | 400m freestyle S13 | 5:02.31 | 5 Q | 4:57.55 | 5 |
| Caleb Arndt | 100m butterfly S13 | 1:15.57 | 10 | did not advance | |
| Caleb Arndt | 200m individual medley SM13 | —N/a | | 2:39.76 | 5 |
| Nicholas Bennett | 200m freestyle S14 | 2:01.33 | 1 Q | 1:59.10 | 1st place, gold medalist(s) |
| Nicholas Bennett | 100m backstroke S14 | 1:07.90 | 4 Q | 1:06.44 | 4 |
| Nicholas Bennett | 100m butterfly S14 | 1:02.91 | 2 Q | 1:01.58 | 2nd place, silver medalist(s) |
| Nicholas Bennett | 100m breaststroke SB14 | 1:10.53 | 1 Q | 1:09.40 | 1st place, gold medalist(s) |
| Nicholas Bennett | 200m individual medley SM14 | 2:20.40 | 1 Q | 2:15.56 | 1st place, gold medalist(s) |
| Jacob Brayshaw | 50m freestyle S2 | 2:04.90 | 8 Q | 2:01.30 | =7 |
| Jacob Brayshaw | 200m freestyle S3 | —N/a | | 8:34.66 | 6 |
| Jacob Brayshaw | 50m backstroke S2 | 2:06.89 | 8 Q | 2:04.87 | 8 |
| Jacob Brayshaw | 100m backstroke S2 | —N/a | | 4:25.19 | 6 |
| Jacob Brayshaw | 50m breaststroke SB2 | 2:04.16 | 9 | did not advance | |
| Jacob Brayshaw | 150m individual medley SM3 | —N/a | | 8:45.45 | 5 |
| Tyson MacDonald | 200m freestyle S14 | 2:05.18 | 2 Q | 2:03.44 | 3rd place, bronze medalist(s) |
| Tyson MacDonald | 100m backstroke S14 | 1:05.99 | 1 Q | 1:04.24 | 1st place, gold medalist(s) |
| Tyson MacDonald | 100m breaststroke SB14 | 1:14.44 | 3 Q | 1:13.99 | 4 |
| Tyson MacDonald | 200m individual medley SM14 | 2:22.25 | 2 Q | 2:19.60 | 2nd place, silver medalist(s) |
| Patrick Waters | 100m breaststroke SB9 | —N/a | | 1:14.77 | 2nd place, silver medalist(s) |

=== Women ===
| Athlete | Event | Heats | | Final | |
| Athlete | Event | Result | Rank | Result | Rank |
|---|---|---|---|---|---|
| Colleen Cloëtta | 100m breaststroke SB7 | 1:50.31 | 3 Q | 1:50.79 | 4 |
| Arianna Hunsicker | 50m freestyle S10 | 30.65 | 4 Q | 30.13 | 3rd place, bronze medalist(s) |
| Arianna Hunsicker | 100m freestyle S10 | 1:08.32 | 4 Q | 1:06.17 | 4 |
| Arianna Hunsicker | 400m freestyle S10 | —N/a | | 5:06.42 | 3rd place, bronze medalist(s) |
| Arianna Hunsicker | 100m backstroke S10 | —N/a | | 1:15.27 | 3rd place, bronze medalist(s) |
| Arianna Hunsicker | 200m individual medley SM10 | —N/a | | 2:48.51 | 3rd place, bronze medalist(s) |
| Angela Marina | 200m freestyle S14 | —N/a | | 2:15.16 | 1st place, gold medalist(s) |
| Angela Marina | 100m backstroke S14 | —N/a | | 1:14.81 | 2nd place, silver medalist(s) |
| Angela Marina | 100m butterfly S14 | —N/a | | 1:12.68 | 1st place, gold medalist(s) |
| Angela Marina | 100m breaststroke SB14 | 1:30.88 | 5 Q | 1:31.36 | 5 |
| Angela Marina | 200m individual medley SM14 | —N/a | | 2:41.78 | 4 |
| Clémence Paré | 50m freestyle S5 | 57.87 | 12 | did not advance | |
| Clémence Paré | 200m freestyle S5 | 4:36.38 | 8 Q | 4:17.62 | 6 |
| Clémence Paré | 50m backstroke S5 | 59.71 | 5 Q | 1:00.92 | 6 |
| Clémence Paré | 50m butterfly S5 | —N/a | | 1:08.55 | 4 |
| Clémence Paré | 100m breaststroke SB5 | —N/a | | 2:57.53 | 7 |
| Clémence Paré | 200m individual medley SM5 | —N/a | | 5:01.03 | 4 |
| Krystal Shaw | 50m freestyle S7 | —N/a | | 40.80 | 2nd place, silver medalist(s) |
| Krystal Shaw | 100m freestyle S7 | —N/a | | 1:23.90 | 2nd place, silver medalist(s) |
| Krystal Shaw | 400m freestyle S8 | —N/a | | 6:14.51 | 7 |
| Krystal Shaw | 50m butterfly S7 | —N/a | | DNS | |
| Krystal Shaw | 100m backstroke S7 | —N/a | | 1:44.82 | 2nd place, silver medalist(s) |
| Krystal Shaw | 200m individual medley SM7 | —N/a | | 3:51.81 | 4 |
| Myriam Soliman | 50m freestyle S6 | 40.20 | 4 Q | 38.51 | 4 |
| Myriam Soliman | 100m freestyle S6 | 1:30.83 | 5 Q | 1:35.85 | 7 |
| Myriam Soliman | 400m freestyle S6 | —N/a | | 7:24.43 | 6 |
| Myriam Soliman | 50m butterfly S6 | 46.53 | 7 Q | 45.84 | 6 |
| Myriam Soliman | 100m backstroke S6 | —N/a | | 1:44.76 | 3rd place, bronze medalist(s) |
| Myriam Soliman | 100m breaststroke SB6 | —N/a | | 2:15.36 | 4 |
| Myriam Soliman | 200m individual medley SM6 | —N/a | | 3:48.10 | 4 |
| Michelle Tovizi | 50m freestyle S7 | —N/a | | 44.07 | 4 |
| Michelle Tovizi | 100m freestyle S7 | —N/a | | 1:33.49 | 5 |
| Michelle Tovizi | 400m freestyle S8 | —N/a | | 6:59.89 | 8 |
| Michelle Tovizi | 100m backstroke S7 | —N/a | | DQ | |
| Emma Van Dyk | 200m freestyle S14 | —N/a | | 2:28.69 | 7 |
| Emma Van Dyk | 100m backstroke S14 | —N/a | | 1:18.82 | 4 |
| Emma Van Dyk | 100m butterfly S14 | —N/a | | 1:18.18 | 3rd place, bronze medalist(s) |
| Emma Van Dyk | 100m breaststroke SB14 | 1:33.46 | 6 Q | 1:32.83 | 6 |
| Emma Van Dyk | 200m individual medley SM14 | —N/a | | 2:45.76 | 5 |
| Colleen Cloëtta; Arianna Hunsicker; Krystal Shaw; Michelle Tovizi | 4 × 100 m freestyle relay | —N/a | | 5:35.07 | 4 |
| Colleen Cloëtta; Arianna Hunsicker; Krystal Shaw; Michelle Tovizi | 4 × 100 m medley relay | —N/a | | 1:08.34 | 3rd place, bronze medalist(s) |

== Table tennis ==
=== Men ===
| Athlete | Event | Preliminaries | | | | Quarterfinals | Semifinals | Final / BM | |
| Athlete | Event | Opposition Result | Opposition Result | Opposition Result | Rank | Opposition Result | Opposition Result | Opposition Result | Rank |
|---|---|---|---|---|---|---|---|---|---|
| Peter Isherwood | Men's singles C2 | Marcio da Costa (BRA); L 0–3 | Nunez (CRC); W 3–0 | —N/a | 2 | did not advance | | | |
| Steven Dunn | Men's singles C3 | Copola (ARG); L 0–3 | Andrade de Freitas (BRA); L 0–3 | —N/a | 3 | did not advance | | | |
| Curtis Caron | Men's singles C8 | Roman Chinchilla (CRC); L 0–3 | Polo Astudillo (ECU); L 1–3 | Cordova (ESA); W 3–0 | 3 | did not advance | | | |
| Ian Kent | Men's singles C8 | Perez (ARG); W 3–1 | Makkar (USA); W 3–1 | Fasanaro (VEN); W 3–0 | 1 Q | Melo (BRA); W 3–2 | Roman (CRC); L 0–3 | —N/a | 3rd place, bronze medalist(s) |

=== Women ===
| Athlete | Event | Preliminaries | | | | | Quarterfinals | Semifinals | Final / BM | |
| Athlete | Event | Opposition Result | Opposition Result | Opposition Result | Opposition Result | Rank | Opposition Result | Opposition Result | Opposition Result | Rank |
|---|---|---|---|---|---|---|---|---|---|---|
| Stephanie Chan | Women's singles C7 | Perez Villalba (MEX); L 3–2 | Dos Santos (BRA); W 3–0 | Ferreira (BRA); L 2–3 | Muñoz (ARG); L 0–3 | —N/a | | | | 3rd place, bronze medalist(s) |

== Taekwondo ==
One Canadian taekwondo athlete is to participate.

| Athlete | Event | Round of 16 | Quarterfinals | Semifinals | Repechage 1st round | Repechage 2nd round | Finals |
| Athlete | Event | Opposition Result | Opposition Result | Opposition Result | Opposition Result | Opposition Result | Opposition Result |
|---|---|---|---|---|---|---|---|
| Anthony Cappello | Men's -61kg | Bye | Castro (DOM); L 28–13 | —N/a | | Figueroa (VEN); WO | did not advance |

== Volleyball ==
Canada's women's sitting volleyball team are ranked world number sixteen.

=== Men's team roster ===
- Doug Learoyd (captain)
- Chris Bird
- Matteo Lisoway
- Jesse Buckingham
- Austin Hinchey
- Jesse Ward
- Bryce Foster
- Mikael Bartholdy
- Jamoi Anderson
- Darek Symonowicz
- Brad Hunter
- Jeff Smith (Head coach)

=== Women's team roster ===
Canada's women's sitting volleyball team are ranked world number six.

- Danielle Ellis (captain)
- Heidi Peters
- Sarah Melenka
- Julie Kozun
- Anne Fergusson
- Jolan Wong
- Felicia Voss-Shafiq
- Katelyn Wright
- Jennifer Oakes
- Angelena Dolezar
- Amber Skyrpan
- Payden Olsen
- Nicole Ban (head coach)

=== Results ===
| Team | Event | Group Stage | | | | | | Semifinal | Final / BM | |
| Team | Event | Opposition Score | Opposition Score | Opposition Score | Opposition Score | Opposition Score | Rank | Opposition Score | Opposition Score | Rank |
|---|---|---|---|---|---|---|---|---|---|---|
| Canada men's | Men's tournament | Colombia; W 3–2 | Peru; W 3–0 | Costa Rica; W 3–0 | Brazil; L 1–3 | United States; L 0–3 | 3 | United States; L 0–3 | Colombia; W 3–0 | (bronze) |
| Country women's | Women's tournament | Brazil | Peru | United States | —N/a | | | | | |

== Wheelchair basketball ==
| Team | Event | Group Stage | | | | Quarterfinal | Semifinal | Final / BM | |
| Team | Event | Opposition Score | Opposition Score | Opposition Score | Rank | Opposition Score | Opposition Score | Opposition Score | Rank |
|---|---|---|---|---|---|---|---|---|---|
| Canada men's | Men's tournament | Colombia (COL); W 64–51 | Mexico (MEX); W 74–48 | Argentina (ARG); W 79–73 | 1 Q | Peru (PER); W 78–31 | Colombia (COL); W 62–42 | United States (USA); L 43–76 | 2nd place, silver medalist(s) |
| Canada women's | Women's tournament | Colombia (COL); W 83–6 | Argentina (ARG); W 82–25 | Mexico (MEX); W 79–21 | 1 Q | —N/a | Brazil (BRA); L 61–40 | United States (USA); W 67–64 | 1st place, gold medalist(s) |

== Wheelchair rugby ==
=== Team roster ===
The mixed team was composed of 1 female and 10 male athletes.

- Travis Brooks Murao
- Michael Whitehead
- Cody Robert Caldwell
- Trevor James Hirschfield (captain)
- Patrice Dagenais (captain)
- Patrice Simard
- Benjamin John Perkins
- Mélanie Labelle
- Shayne Smith
- Zachary David Madell
- Eric Furtado Rodrigues
- Patrick Côté (Head coach)
- David James Willsie (Assistant coach)

=== Results ===
| Round robin | | | | | | Semifinal | Final / BM | |
| Opposition Score | Opposition Score | Opposition Score | Opposition Score | Opposition Score | Rank | Opposition Score | Opposition Score | Rank |
|---|---|---|---|---|---|---|---|---|
| Argentina; W 60–24 | Brazil; W 58–43 | Colombia; W 64–45 | Chile; W 70–34 | United States; L 51–54 | 2 | Brazil; W 56–46 | United States; L 58–57 | (silver) |

== See also ==
- Canada at the 2019 Pan American Games
- Canada at the 2020 Summer Paralympics
