= Wheelchair tennis at the 2019 Parapan American Games =

- Date: 24–30 August
- Edition: 5th
- Location: Club Lawn Tennis de La Exposcicion

Champions

Men's singles
- Gustavo Fernandez; Argentina

Women's singles
- Angélica Bernal; Colombia

Men's doubles
- Gustavo Fernandez - Augustin Ledesman; Argentina

Women's doubles
- Emmy Kaiser - Dana Mathewson; United States

Quad singles
- Robert Shaw; Canada
← 2015 ·	Parapan American Games	· 2023 →

Wheelchair tennis at the 2019 Parapan American Games took place from 24 to 30 August at the Club Lawn Tennis de La Exposcicion in Lima. The men's and women's singles champions qualified directly for the 2020 Summer Paralympics.

== Participating nations ==
There were 44 tennis players from 14 countries scheduled to compete. They were ranked according to singles' rankings as of 8 July 2019. Argentina's Gustavo Fernandez was the reigning men's singles champion while Natalia Mayara from Brazil hoped to win the gold medal in the women's singles.

- Argentina (4)
- Brazil (5)
- Canada (4)
- Chile (5)
- Colombia (4)
- Costa Rica (1)
- Cuba (1)
- Ecuador (1)
- El Salvador (2)
- Guatemala (2)
- Mexico (2)
- Peru (5) (Host country)
- United States (6)
- Venezuela (2)

== Medalists ==
Event	Gold	Silver	Bronze
Men's singles	Gustavo Fernandez; Argentina	Agustín Ledesma; Argentina	Daniel Rodrigues; Brazil
Women's singles	Angélica Bernal; Colombia	Macarena Cabrillana; Chile	Dana Mathewson; United States
Men's doubles	Argentina; Gustavo Fernandez; Agustín Ledesma	United States; Christopher Herman; Casey Ratzlaff	Chile; Alexander Cataldo; Diego Perez
Women's doubles	United States; Emmy Kaiser; Dana Mathewson	Colombia; Angélica Bernal; Johana Martínez	Argentina; Nicole Dhers; Maria Moreno
Quads' singles	Robert Shaw; Canada	David Wagner; United States	Bryan Barten; United States

== See also ==
- Tennis at the 2019 Pan American Games
- Wheelchair tennis at the 2020 Summer Paralympics
