= Wheelchair basketball at the 2019 Parapan American Games =

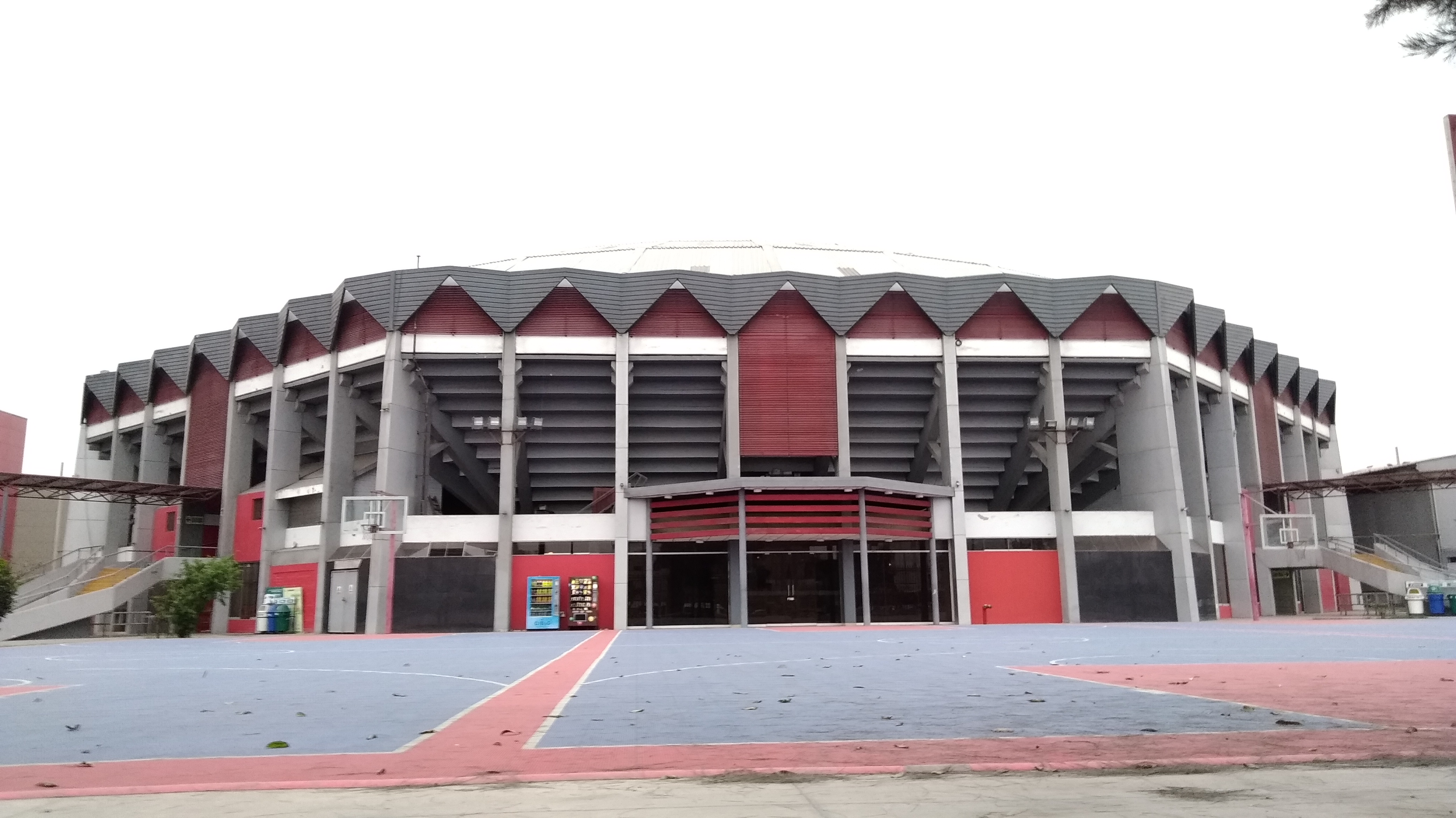
- Venue: Lima
- Competitors: 192 from 9 nations

Wheelchair basketball was played at the 2019 Parapan American Games. The two finalists in the women's tournament and the three medalists in the men's tournament qualified for the 2020 Summer Paralympics.

== Medalists ==
Event	Gold	Silver	Bronze
Men's tournament	United States; Jorge Sánchez; Jacob Williams; Joshua Turek; Michael Paye; Ryan Neiswender; Brian Bell; Matthew Scott; Steven Serio; Matt Lesperance; Trevon Jenifer; John Boie; Aaron Gouge Ron Lykins; Robb Taylor	Canada; Nikola Goncin; Deion Green; Robert Hedges; Vincent Dallaire; Blaise Mutware; Colin Higgins; Lee Melymick; Chad Jassman; Patrick Anderson; Jonathan Vermette; Tyler Miller; David Eng Matteo Feriani; Joey Johnson	Colombia; Nelson Sanz; Raúl Vega; Joymar Granados; Guillermo Alzate; Yeison Pérez; Andrés Flórez; Jose Leep; Jhon Hernández; Daniel Díaz; Rodney Hawkins; Juan Escobar; Jhoan Vargas Ana Cardoso; Elkin Well
Women's tournament	Canada; Rosalie Lalonde; Élodie Tessier; Arinn Young; Cindy Ouellet; Tamara Steeves; Maude Jacques; Puisand Lai; Tara Llanes; Sandrine Bérubé; Kady Dandeneau; Erica Gavel; Danielle DuPlessis Simon Cass; Marc Ducharme	United States; Alejandra Ibáñez; Megan Blunk; Darlene Hunter; Josie Aslakson; Natalie Schneider; Rebecca Murray; Rose Hollermann; Kaitlyn Eaton; Abigail Dunkin; Lindsey Zurbrugg; Bailey Moody; Courtney Ryan Johnson Jr L. Amy Spangler	Brazil; Cleonete Santos; Gabriela Oliveira; Perla Assuncao; Lucicleia Costa; Maxcileide Ramos; Ana Aurélia Rosa; Debora Costa; Adrienne De Souza; Oara Uchoa; Silvelane Oliveira; Paola Klokler; Vileide Almeida Wilson Da Silva; F. De Andrade

== Men's tournament ==
Qualified for semifinals

=== Group A ===
Team	Pld	W	L	PF	PA	PD	Points
Canada (CAN)	3	3	0	217	172	+45	6
Argentina (ARG)	3	2	1	211	190	+21	5
Colombia (COL)	3	1	2	184	206	-22	4
Mexico (MEX)	3	0	3	180	224	-44	3

Results summary

25 August
8:00

Mexico	56–70	Argentina
Scoring by quarter: 13 - 18, 16 - 17, 19 - 18, 10 - 17
Pts: Martinez 20; Rebs: Prieto 8 Asts: Martinez 5		Pts: Perez 19; Rebs: Perez 12; Asts: Berdun 16

Sports Center 1

25 August
16:15

Colombia	51–64	Canada
Scoring by quarter: 11 - 19, 16 - 20, 9 - 10, 15 - 15
Pts: Hawkins 16; Rebs: Hawkins 16; Asts: Leep 9		Pts: Anderson 25; Rebs: Anderson 11; Asts: Anderson 9

Sports Center 1

26 August
10:15

Canada	74–48	Mexico
Scoring by quarter: 14 - 17, 19 - 8, 21 - 14, 20 - 9
Pts: Anderson 26; Rebs: Anderson 20; Asts: Anderson 9		Pts: Sandoval 18; Rebs: Sandoval 9 Asts: Sandoval 4

Sports Center 1

26 August
10:15

Argentina	68–53	Colombia
Scoring by quarter: 17 - 11, 14 - 7, 11 - 19, 26 - 16
Pts: Berdun 25; Rebs: Berdun, Perez 7 Asts: Gabas 8		Pts: Leep 10; Rebs: Hawkins 11; Asts: Leep 7

Sports Center 1

27 August
12:30

Colombia	80–74 (OT)	Mexico
Scoring by quarter: 14 - 19, 13 - 14, 20 - 21, 21 - 14, Overtime: 12 - 6
Pts: Hernandez 31; Rebs: Hawkins 14; Asts: Leep 7		Pts: Martinez 28; Rebs: Martinez 10; Asts: Martinez 7

Sports Center 1

27 August
20:45

Canada	79–73	Argentina
Scoring by quarter: 25 - 15, 17 - 28, 21 - 10, 16 - 20
Pts: Anderson 24; Rebs: Goncin 11; Asts: Goncin 10		Pts: Berdun 26; Rebs: Perez 6 Asts: Berdun 9

Sports Center 1

=== Group B ===
Team	Pld	W	L	PF	PA	PD	Points
United States (USA)	3	3	0	307	96	+211	6
Brazil (BRA)	3	2	1	232	179	+53	5
Puerto Rico (PUR)	3	1	2	204	228	-24	4
Peru (PER)	3	0	3	81	321	-240	3

Results summary

24 August
8:00

United States	106–35	Puerto Rico
Scoring by quarter: 22 - 6, 31 - 9, 23 - 13, 30 - 7
Pts: Williams 23; Rebs: Scott 7 Asts: Jenifer 7		Pts: Blair 15; Rebs: Cruz 4 Asts: Ocasio 3

Sports Center 1

24 August
18:30

Peru	25–105	Brazil
Scoring by quarter: 5 - 26, 9 - 25, 7 - 28, 4 - 26
Pts: G da Silva 20; Rebs: G da Silva, L da Silva 7 Asts: M Silva 8		Pts: Sagua, Torres 8 Rebs: Zapata 5 Asts: Zapata 3

Sports Center 1

25 August
12:30

Puerto Rico	67–80	Brazil
Scoring by quarter: 20 - 17, 12 - 25, 16 - 23, 19 - 15
Pts: Blair 30; Rebs: Blair 9 Asts: Blair, Ocasio 4		Pts: M Silva 31; Rebs: de Miranda 13; Asts: M Silva 7

Sports Center 1

25 August
18:30

United States	114–14	Peru
Scoring by quarter: 33 - 3, 31 - 4, 29 - 3, 21 - 4
Pts: Scott 22; Rebs: Sánchez, Serio 6 Asts: Serio 8

Sports Center 1

26 August
12:30

Brazil	47–87	United States
Scoring by quarter: 14 - 22, 13 - 25, 5 - 28, 15 - 12
Pts: Viana 9 Rebs: M Silva 6 Asts: M Silva 7		Pts: Jenifer 18; Rebs: Bell 7 Asts: Serio 9

Sports Center 1

26 August
20:45

Peru	42–102	Puerto Rico
Scoring by quarter: 7 - 31, 13 - 28, 6 - 25, 16 - 18
Pts: Zapata 25; Rebs: Zapata 10; Asts: Calvera, Torres 2		Pts: Blair 34; Rebs: Blair 16; Asts: Ocasio 13

Sports Center 1

=== Final rounds ===
Quarterfinals

28 August
8:00

Brazil	66–74	Colombia
Scoring by quarter: 14 - 15, 15 - 16, 19 - 17, 18 - 26
Pts: M Silva 21; Rebs: M Silva 11; Asts: M Silva 8		Pts: Hawkins 19; Rebs: Hawkins 21; Asts: Leep 8

Sports Center 1

28 August
10:15

United States	81–42	Mexico
Scoring by quarter: 21 - 8, 29 - 10, 12 - 15, 19 - 9
Pts: Serio 22; Rebs: Serio 10; Asts: Serio 8		Pts: Martinez 17; Rebs: Jasso, Martinez 9 Asts: Martinez, Sandoval 5

Sports Center 1

28 August
18:30

Canada	78–31	Peru
Scoring by quarter: 26 - 5, 21 - 7, 20 - 3, 11 - 6
Pts: Green 14; Rebs: Mutware 8 Asts: Eng, Goncin, Green 5		Pts: Zapata 24; Rebs: Torres 8 Asts: Torres 4

Sports Center 1

28 August
20:45

Argentina	78–58	Puerto Rico
Scoring by quarter: 24 - 10, 18 - 12, 17 - 17, 16 - 19
Pts: Perez, Villafañe 12; Rebs: Gabas, Ruggeri 5 Asts: Berdun 13		Pts: Martinez 18; Rebs: Blair 14; Asts: Blair 7

Sports Center 1

Semifinals

30 August
10:30

Canada	62–42	Colombia
Scoring by quarter: 18 - 12, 24 - 13, 18 - 4, 2 - 13
Pts: Anderson 20; Rebs: Anderson 16; Asts: Anderson 7		Pts: Hernandez 8 Rebs: Hawkins 14; Asts: Hernandez 4

Sports Center 1

30 August
12:45

Argentina	36–67	United States
Scoring by quarter: 9 - 12, 8 - 19, 6 - 21, 13 - 15
Pts: Villafañe 9 Rebs: Berdun, Gabas 6 Asts: Berdun, Copa 3		Pts: Turek 18; Rebs: Serio 12; Asts: Serio 7

Sports Center 1

Bronze medal match

31 August
14:30

Colombia	58–51	Argentina
Scoring by quarter: 12 - 13, 18 - 8, 7 - 13, 21 - 17
Pts: Hawkins 18; Rebs: Hawkins 18; Asts: Hernandez 8		Pts: Villafañe 11; Rebs: Berdun 8 Asts: Berdun 12

Sports Center 1

Gold medal match

31 August
17:30

Canada	43–76	United States
Scoring by quarter: 11 - 18, 12 - 17, 9 - 26, 11 - 15
Pts: Goncin 12; Rebs: Melymick 6 Asts: Goncin 4		Pts: Turek 18; Rebs: Serio 12; Asts: Serio 8

Sports Center 1

== Women's tournament ==
Qualified for semifinals

=== Group A ===
Team	Pld	W	L	PF	PA	PD	Points
Canada (CAN)	3	3	0	244	52	+192	6
Argentina (ARG)	3	2	1	155	150	+5	5
Mexico (MEX)	3	1	2	116	175	-59	4
Colombia (COL)	3	0	3	58	196	-138	3

Results summary

24 August
12:30

Canada	83–6	Colombia
Scoring by quarter: 28 - 4, 26 - 2, 19 - 0, 10 - 0
Pts: Dandeneau 21; Rebs: Dandeneau 7 Asts: Lalonde, Ouellet, Tessier, Young 5		Pts: Gomez 6 Rebs: Gomez 8

Sports Center 1

24 August
16:15

Mexico	49–63	Argentina
Scoring by quarter: 18 - 18, 6 - 26, 12 - 12, 13 - 7
Pts: Perez 20; Rebs: Dominguez 9 Asts: Ventura 8		Pts: Pallares 31; Rebs: Pallares 12; Asts: Linari 6

Sports Center 1

25 August
10:15

Mexico	46–33	Colombia
Scoring by quarter: 16 - 15, 10 - 2, 18 - 4, 2 - 12
Pts: Ventura 12; Rebs: Hernandez, Perez 6 Asts: Perez 6		Pts: Gomez 21; Rebs: Rodriguez 14; Asts: Gomez 4

Sports Center 1

25 August
20:45

Canada	82–25	Argentina
Scoring by quarter: 20 - 6, 27 - 2, 27 - 10, 8 - 7
Pts: Young 29; Rebs: Llanes, Young 5 Asts: Young 5		Pts: Linari 9 Rebs: Sallis 5 Asts: Olmedo 3

Sports Center 1

27 August
8:00

Mexico	21–79	Canada
Scoring by quarter: 2 - 19, 6 - 17, 4 - 21, 9 - 22
Pts: Ventura 8 Rebs: Ventura 9 Asts: Dominguez 2		Pts: Young 29; Rebs: Dandeneau 10; Asts: Ouellet 10

Sports Center 1

27 August
16:15

Argentina	67–19	Colombia
Scoring by quarter: 16 - 6, 14 - 3, 18 - 6, 19 - 4
Pts: Linari, Pallares, Redi 16; Rebs: Pallares 11; Asts: Olmedo, Pallares 6		Pts: Gomez 8 Rebs: Gomez 11; Asts: Gomez 2

Sports Center 1

=== Group B ===
Team	Pld	W	L	PF	PA	PD	Points
United States (USA)	3	1	0	249	68	+181	6
Brazil (BRA)	3	2	1	201	79	+122	5
Chile (CHI)	3	1	2	57	191	-134	4
Peru (PER)	3	0	3	52	221	-169	3

Results summary

24 August
10:15

United States	92–10	Chile
Scoring by quarter: 22 - 2, 21 - 2, 25 - 4, 24 - 2
Pts: Zurbrugg 28; Rebs: Dunkin, Moody 6 Asts: Murray 16		Pts: Álvarez, Alegria 4 Rebs: Molina 5 Asts: Álvarez, Vilches 1

Sports Center 1

24 August
20:45

Peru	8–88	Brazil
Scoring by quarter: 2 - 24, 4 - 27, 0 - 17, 2 - 20
Pts: Sanabria 4 Rebs: Herrera 11; Asts: Burgos, Torres 1		Pts: Assunção 20; Rebs: Almeida 7 Asts: Rosa 6

Sports Center 1

26 August
8:00

Chile	14–71	Brazil
Scoring by quarter: 0 - 20, 7 - 16, 5 - 19, 2 - 16
Pts: Alregria 12; Rebs: Alegria 11; Asts: Alegria, Alvarez 1		Pts: Almeida 18; Rebs: Almeida 7 Asts: Rosa 5

Sports Center 1

26 August
16:15

United States	100–16	Peru
Scoring by quarter: 25 - 2, 30 - 8, 23 - 2, 22 - 4
Pts: Hollermann 27; Rebs: Dunkin 12; Asts: Murray 16		Pts: Herrera 8 Rebs: Herrera 6 Asts: Gonzales 2

Sports Center 1

27 August
10:15

Brazil	42–57	United States
Scoring by quarter: 10 - 24, 8 - 4, 12 - 12, 12 - 17
Pts: Assunção 17; Rebs: Almeida 11; Asts: Almeida 3		Pts: Murray 22; Rebs: Hollermann 12; Asts: Hollermann 9

Sports Center 1

27 August
18:30

Peru	28–33	Chile
Scoring by quarter: 10 - 14, 5 - 9, 6 - 5, 7 - 5
Pts: Torres 8 Rebs: Herrera 16; Asts: Sanabria 3		Pts: Carrasco 12; Rebs: Alvarez 18; Asts: Alvarez 6

Sports Center 1

=== Final rounds ===
5-8th classification matches

28 August
12:30

Boxscore

Chile	16–36	Colombia
Scoring by quarter: 2–9, 0–11, 8–8, 6–8
Pts: Alvarez, Carrasco 6 Rebs: Alvarez 8 Asts: Alvarez, Vilches 2		Pts: Gomez 28; Rebs: Gomez 13; Asts: Gomez 4

Sports Center 1

28 August
16:15

Boxscore

Mexico	65–17	Peru
Scoring by quarter: 16–6, 22–6, 18–2, 9–3
Pts: Perez 26; Rebs: Perez 6 Asts: Ventura 7		Pts: Torres 5 Rebs: Herrera 12; Asts: Garcia, Torres, Zegarra 1

Sports Center 1

7/8th classification match

29 August
8:00

Boxscore

Peru	46–21	Chile
Scoring by quarter: 10–1, 8–2, 22–3, 6–15
Pts: Sanabria 28; Rebs: Herrera 10; Asts: Torres 5		Pts: Alegria 9 Rebs: Alvarez 12; Asts: Carrasco 3

Sports Center 1

5/6th classification match

29 August
12:30

Boxscore

Mexico	69–21	Colombia
Scoring by quarter: 16–4, 16–4, 22–3, 15–10
Pts: Perez 23; Rebs: Montes, Perez 6 Asts: Perez 4		Pts: Gomez 12; Rebs: Gomez, Rodriguez 10; Asts: Gomez 3

Sports Center 1

Semifinals

29 August
18:30

Boxscore

Canada	61–40	Brazil
Scoring by quarter: 14–13, 9–5, 23–8, 15–14
Pts: Young 24; Rebs: Young 11; Asts: Lalonde 7		Pts: Almeida 11; Rebs: Assunção 7 Asts: Assunção, L Costa, Rosa, Santos 2

Sports Center 1

29 August
20:45

Boxscore

Argentina	24–82	United States
Scoring by quarter: 5–22, 8–21, 1–23, 10–16
Pts: Linari 9 Rebs: Pallares 6 Asts: Pallares 3		Pts: Zurbrugg 16; Rebs: Hollermann 12; Asts: Hollermann 15

Sports Center 1

Bronze medal match

30 August
16:30

Boxscore

Brazil	69–44	Argentina
Scoring by quarter: 16–8, 18–9, 16–11, 19–18
Pts: D Costa 19; Rebs: D Costa, Santos 6 Asts: Assunção 10		Pts: Pallares 18; Rebs: Pallares 15; Asts: Pallares 8

Sports Center 1

Gold medal match

30 August
18:45

Boxscore

United States	64–67	Canada
Scoring by quarter: 16–11, 16–20, 20–16, 12–20
Pts: Murray 22; Rebs: Schneider 9 Asts: Murray 12		Pts: Dandeneau 25; Rebs: Dandeneau 10; Asts: Dandeneau, Young 10

Sports Center 1

== See also ==
- Basketball at the 2019 Pan American Games
- Wheelchair basketball at the 2020 Summer Paralympics
