= Argentina at the 2019 Parapan American Games =

- IPC code: ARG
- NPC: Argentine Paralympic Committee

in Lima
- Competitors: 223 in 16 sports
- Flag bearer: Gustavo Fernandez
- Medals Ranked 5th: Gold 17 Silver 28 Bronze 37 Total 82

Parapan American Games appearances
- 1999; 2003; 2007; 2011; 2015; 2019; 2023

Argentina competed in the 2019 Parapan American Games in Lima, Peru. This was the country's largest delegation to the Parapan American Games in its history. In total athletes representing Argentina won 17 gold medals, 28 silver medals, 37 bronze medals and finished 5th in the medal table.

== Medalists ==
Medal	Name	Sport	Event
Gold	Alexis Sebastian Chavez	Athletics	Men's 100m T36
Gold	Hernan Barreto	Athletics	Men's 200m T35
Gold	Alexis Sebastian Chavez	Athletics	Men's 400m T36
Gold	Jorge Ruben Madril	Athletics	Men's 1500m T20
Gold	Alejandro Maldonado	Athletics	Men's 5000m T54
Gold	Brian Leonel Impellizzeri	Athletics	Men's long jump T37/38
Gold	Hernan Emanuel Urra	Athletics	Men's shot put F35/36/37
Gold	Yanina Martinez	Athletics	Women's 100m T36
Gold	Yanina Martinez	Athletics	Women's 200m T36
Gold	Agustina Antonella Ruiz	Athletics	Women's discus throw F41
Gold	Jonatan Aquino; Luis Cristaldo; Alien Flores; Mauricio Ibarbure	Boccia	Mixed team BC1/BC2
Gold	Mariela Delgado	Cycling	Women's road race C4-5
Gold	Eduardo Garto	Judo	Men's -66kg
Gold	Inaki Basiloff	Swimming	Men's 400m freestyle S7
Gold	Matias de Andrade	Swimming	Men's 100m backstroke S6
Gold	Fernando Carlomagno	Swimming	Men's 100m backstroke S7
Gold	Sergio Zayas	Swimming	Men's 100m backstroke S11
Gold	Lautaro Cancinos	Swimming	Men's 100m butterfly S14
Gold	Nadia Baez	Swimming	Women's 50m freestyle S11
Gold	Daniela Gimenez	Swimming	Women's 100m breaststroke SB9
Gold	Nadia Baez	Swimming	Women's 100m breaststroke SB11
Gold	Daniela Gimenez	Swimming	Women's 200m individual medley SM9
Gold	Gabriel Copola	Table tennis	Men's singles C3
Gold	Mauro Depergola	Table tennis	Men's singles C5
Gold	Gustavo Fernandez	Wheelchair tennis	Men's singles
Gold	Gustavo Fernandez; Agustin Ledesma	Wheelchair tennis	Men's doubles
Silver	Hernan Barreto	Athletics	Men's 100m T35
Silver	Brian Leonel Impellizzeri	Athletics	Men's 100m T37
Silver	Alejandro Maldonado	Athletics	Men's 1500m T54
Silver	Antonio Alexis Ortiz	Athletics	Men's shot put F11
Silver	Jonathan Marin	Athletics	Men's shot put F12
Silver	Andres Pinillos	Athletics	Men's shot put F40/41
Silver	Antonio Ortiz	Athletics	Men's discus throw F11
Silver	Valeria Nancy Jara	Athletics	Women's 100m T54
Silver	Florencia Belen Romero	Athletics	Women's shot put F12
Silver	Agustina Antonella Ruiz	Athletics	Women's shot put F40/41
Silver	Luis Cristaldo	Boccia	Mixed individual BC2
Silver	Raul Villalbal	Cycling	Men's road race B
Silver	Maximiliano Gomez	Cycling	Men's 1km time trial B
Silver	Mariela Delgado	Cycling	Women's 500m time trial C1-5
Silver	Argentina's national football 5-a-side team	Football 5-a-side	Men's tournament
Silver	Argentina's national football 7-a-side team	Football 7-a-side	Men's tournament
Silver	Laura Gonzalez	Judo	Women's -57kg
Silver	Inaki Basiloff	Swimming	Men's 50m freestyle S7
Silver	Inaki Basiloff	Swimming	Men's 100m freestyle S7
Silver	Nicolas Nieto	Swimming	Men's 100m freestyle S10
Silver	Nicolas Nieto	Swimming	Men's 400m freestyle S10
Silver	Lauturo Cancinos	Swimming	Men's 100m backstroke S14
Silver	Elian Araya	Swimming	Men's 100m breaststroke SB14
Silver	Inaki Basiloff	Swimming	Men's 50m butterfly S7
Silver	Inaki Basiloff	Swimming	Men's 200m individual medley SM7
Silver	Santiago Senestro	Swimming	Men's 200m individual medley SM10
Silver	Facundo Arregui; Inaki Basiloff; Bruno Lemaire; Nicolas Nieto	Swimming	Men's 4x100m freestyle relay 34pts
Silver	Inaki Basiloff; Fernando Carlomagno; Bruno Lemaire; Santiago Senestro	Swimming	Men's 4x100m medley relay 34pts
Silver	Daniela Gimenez	Swimming	Women's 50m freestyle S9
Silver	Ana Noriega	Swimming	Women's 100m freestyle S5
Silver	Daniela Gimenez	Swimming	Women's 100m freestyle S9
Silver	Daniela Gimenez	Swimming	Women's 100m butterfly S9
Silver	Enzo Fais; Anabel Moro; Analuz Pellitero; Sergio Zayas	Swimming	Mixed 4x100m freestyle relay
Silver	Aleksey Kaniuka	Table tennis	Men's singles C7
Silver	Nayla Kuell	Table tennis	Women's singles C5
Silver	Giselle Munoz	Table tennis	Women's singles C7
Silver	Agustin Ledesma	Wheelchair tennis	Men's singles
Bronze	Gabriel Emmanuel Sosa	Athletics	Men's 100m T54
Bronze	Brian Leonel Impellizzeri	Athletics	Men's 200m T37
Bronze	Alejandro Maldonado	Athletics	Men's 400m T54
Bronze	Alejandro Maldonado	Athletics	Men's 800m T54
Bronze	Pablo Damian Gimenez	Athletics	Men's shot put F57
Bronze	Matias Leonel Puebla	Athletics	Men's javelin throw F48
Bronze	Blanca Cerrudo	Athletics	Women's 100m T13
Bronze	Lucia Montenegro	Athletics	Women's 100m T54
Bronze	Lis Yamila Scaroni	Athletics	Women's 200m T37
Bronze	Rosario Coppola	Athletics	Women's long jump T11/12
Bronze	Aldana Isabel Ibanez	Athletics	Women's long jump T47
Bronze	Florencia Romero	Athletics	Women's discus throw F11
Bronze	Jonatan Aquino	Boccia	Mixed individual BC2
Bronze	Maximiliano Gomez	Cycling	Men's road race B
Bronze	Oscar Biga	Cycling	Men's road race H3-5
Bronze	Raul Villalbal	Cycling	Men's 1km time trial B
Bronze	Maximiliano Gomez	Cycling	Men's individual pursuit B
Bronze	Mariela Delgado	Cycling	Women's individual pursuit C4-5
Bronze	Rodolfo Ramirez	Judo	Men's -73kg
Bronze	Paula Gomez	Judo	Women's -52kg
Bronze	Nadia Boggiano	Judo	Women's -70kg
Bronze	Bruno Lemaire	Swimming	Men's 100m freestyle S10
Bronze	Facundo Arregui	Swimming	Men's 400m freestyle S7
Bronze	Amilcar Guerra	Swimming	Men's 100m backstroke S8
Bronze	Franco Gomez	Swimming	Men's 50m breaststroke SB3
Bronze	Ariel Quassi	Swimming	Men's 100m breaststroke SB4
Bronze	German Arevalo	Swimming	Men's 100m breaststroke SB5
Bronze	Fernando Carlomagno	Swimming	Men's 100m breaststroke SB6
Bronze	Agustin Orellana	Swimming	Men's 100m butterfly S8
Bronze	Amilcar Guerra	Swimming	Men's 100m butterfly S9
Bronze	Ana Noriega	Swimming	Women's 50m freestyle S5
Bronze	Nadia Baez	Swimming	Women's 100m freestyle S11
Bronze	Nadia Baez	Swimming	Women's 400m freestyle S11
Bronze	Analuz Pellitero	Swimming	Women's 100m backstroke S10
Bronze	Ana Noriega	Swimming	Women's 100m breaststroke SB5
Bronze	Fernando Eberhardt	Table tennis	Men's singles C1
Bronze	Elias Romero	Table tennis	Men's singles C5
Bronze	Daniel Rodriguez	Table tennis	Men's singles C5
Bronze	Guillermo Bustamante; Fernando Eberhardt	Table tennis	Men's team C1-2
Bronze	Gabriel Copola; Mauro Depergola	Table tennis	Men's team C3-5
Bronze	Veronica Blanco; Maria Garrone; Nayla Kuell	Table tennis	Women's team C2-5
Bronze	Juan Samorano	Taekwondo	Men's -75kg
Bronze	Nicole Dhers; Maria Moreno	Wheelchair tennis	Women's doubles

== Table tennis ==
Men

Athlete	Event	Preliminaries					Quarterfinals	Semifinals	Final / BM	
Athlete	Event	Opposition Result	Opposition Result	Opposition Result	Opposition Result	Rank	Opposition Result	Opposition Result	Opposition Result	Rank
Guillermo Bustamante	Men's singles C1	Leiva (CHI); W 3-0	Fernández (CUB); L 1-3	Contessi (BRA); L 1-3	—N/a	3	Did not advance			
Fernando Eberhardt	Men's singles C1	Godfrey (USA); W 3-0	Junior (BRA); L 1-3	Cuenca (CUB); W 3-1	—N/a	2 Q	—N/a	Fernández (CUB); L 1-3	Did not advance	3rd place, bronze medalist(s)
Gabriel Copola	Men's singles C3	Dunn (CAN); W 3-0	Freitas (BRA); W 3-2	—N/a		1 Q	—N/a	Quijada (VEN); W 3-1	van Emburgh (USA); W 3-1	1st place, gold medalist(s)
Mauro Depergola	Men's singles C4	D Rodriguez (ARG); W 3-2	La Rose (TTO); W 3-0	—N/a		1 Q	—N/a	Romero (ARG); W 3-2	Sarand (USA); W 3-2	1st place, gold medalist(s)
Daniel Rodriguez	Men's singles C4	Depergola (ARG); L 2-3	La Rose (TTO); W 3-0	—N/a		2 Q	—N/a	Sarand (USA); L 0-3	Did not advance	3rd place, bronze medalist(s)
Elias Romero	Men's singles C4	Ge Salazar (GUA); W 3-0	Sarand (USA); L 1-3	—N/a		2 Q	—N/a	Depergola (ARG); L 2-3	Did not advance	3rd place, bronze medalist(s)
Aleksy Kaniuka	Men's singles C7	Salmin (BRA); L 1-3	Vargas (COL); W 3-2	Giraud (VEN); W 3-0	Diaz (VEN); W 3-0	—N/a				2nd place, silver medalist(s)
Pablo Krotsch	Men's singles C8	Henao (COL); L 1-3	Ga Salazar (ECU); W 3-0	Melo (BRA); L 2-3	—N/a	3	Did not advance			
Alejandro Perez	Men's singles C8	Fasanaro (VEN); W 3-0	Kent (CAN); L 1-3	Makkar (USA); W 3-0	—N/a	2 Q	Manara (BRA); L 0-3	Did not advance		
Dario Neira	Men's singles C10	Carbinatti (BRA); L 0-3	Castro (CHI); L 0-3	—N/a		3	Did not advance			
Guillermo Bustamante; Fernando Eberhardt	Men's team C1-2	Venezuela (VEN); W 3-0	United States (USA); W 3-0	—N/a		1 Q	—N/a	Chile (CHI); L 1-3	Did not advance	3rd place, bronze medalist(s)
Mauro Depergola; Daniel Rodrigues; Elias Romero	Men's teams C3-5	Venezuela (VEN); L 2-3	Costa Rica (CRC); W 3-0	—N/a		2 Q	United States (USA); W 3-1	Brazil (BRA); L 0-3	Did not advance	3rd place, bronze medalist(s)
Pablo Krotsch; Alejandro Perez	Men's team 6-8	Brazil (BRA); L 1-3	Costa Rica (CRC); W 3-2	—N/a		2 Q	United States (USA); L 2-3	Did not advance		

Women

Athlete	Event	Preliminaries					Quarterfinals	Semifinals	Final / BM	
Athlete	Event	Opposition Result	Opposition Result	Opposition Result	Opposition Result	Rank	Opposition Result	Opposition Result	Opposition Result	Rank
Verónica Blanco	Women's singles C2-3	Fontaine (USA); L 0-3	Azevedo (BRA); L 2-3	—N/a		3	Did not advance			
Maria Garrone	Women's singles C2-3	Severo (BRA); L 0-3	Carrillo (VEN); W 3-0	—N/a		2 Q	Oliveira (BRA); L 1-3	Did not advance		
Nayla Kuell	Women's singles C5	Sanchez (COL); W 3-0	Leonelli (CHI); L 2-3	Da Silva (BRA); W 3-0	—N/a					2nd place, silver medalist(s)
Giselle Muñoz	Women's singles C7	Perez (MEX); L 1-3	Ferreira (BRA); W 3-0	Santos (BRA); W 3-0	Chan (CAN); W 3-0	—N/a				2nd place, silver medalist(s)
Maria Garrone; Nayla Kuell	Women's teams C2-5	Brazil (BRA); L 0-2	United States (USA); W 2-1	—N/a		2 Q	—N/a	Mexico (MEX); L 1-2	Did not advance	3rd place, bronze medalist(s)

== Wheelchair rugby ==
=== Team roster ===
The mixed team was composed of 11 male athletes.

- Juan Herrera
- Jose Arhancet
- Fernando Cañumil
- Matías Cardozo (captain)
- Emanuel Castro
- Mariana Santoro
- Lautaro Fernandez
- Mariano Gaastaldi
- Marcelo Ullua
- Lucas Camussi
- Juan Bandini
- Emmanuel Leguizamon (Head coach)
- Andres Mariano Hurtado (Assistant coach)

=== Results ===
Round robin						5/6 Playoff	Rank
Opposition Score	Opposition Score	Opposition Score	Opposition Score	Opposition Score	Rank	Opposition Score	Rank
Canada; L 24–60	United States; L 7–48	Chile; W 56–47	Brazil; L 21–65	Colombia; L 37–51	2	Chile; W 52–38	5

== Wheelchair tennis ==
At the time Gustavo Fernandez was a reigning champion in the men's singles and he won a medal in both the men's singles event and men's doubles event.

== See also ==
- Argentina at the 2019 Pan American Games
- Argentina at the 2020 Summer Paralympics
