= Football 5-a-side at the 2019 Parapan American Games =

Football 5-a-side at the 2015 Parapan American Games
- Venue: Hockey field, Villa María del Triunfo
- Dates: 24–30 August 2019
- Competitors: 60 from 6 nations

5-a-side football at the 2019 Parapan American Games were held in Villa Maria del Triunfo Hockey centre, Lima from August 24–30, 2019. There was 1 gold medals in this sport.

== Medal summary ==
=== Medal table ===
Rank	Nation	Gold	Silver	Bronze	Total
1	Brazil (BRA)	1	0	0	1
2	Argentina (ARG)	0	1	0	1
3	Mexico (MEX)	0	0	1	1
Totals (3 entries)		1	1	1	3

=== Medalists ===
Event	Gold	Silver	Bronze
Men's team	Brazil (BRA) Luan de Lacerda Gonçalves; Maicon Júnior Dos Santos Mendes; Cássio Lopes Dos Reis; Jardiel Vieira Soares; Jeferson da Conceição Gonçalves; Raimundo Nonato Alves Mendes; Tiago da Silva; Ricardo Steinmetz Alves; Gledson da Paixão Barros; Matheus da Costa Coelho Bum	Argentina (ARG) Dario Aldo Lencina; Angel Ricardo Deldo Garcia; Federico Miguel Accardi; Froilan Durval Padilla; Silvio Mauricio Velo; Marcelo Alejand Panizza; Nahuel Armando Heredia; Nicolas Agustin Veliz; German Muleck; Maximiliano Ant Espinillo	Mexico (MEX) Javier Augusto Amozurrutia Castro; Jonathan Agustí Lopez Hernandez; Jose Eduardo Cerezo Rivera; Francisco Javie Rangel Monreal; Moises Cezero Rivera; Gerardo Javier Sotelo Martinez; Omar Otero Munoz; Edgar Javier Carrillo Montes De; Felipe Gustavo Arana Magana; Rubicel De La Cruz Torres

== Results ==
=== Group stage ===
Team	Pld	W	D	L	GF	GA	GD	Pts	Qualification
Argentina	5	4	1	0	7	0	+7	13	Gold medal match
Brazil	5	3	2	0	12	0	+12	11	Gold medal match
Colombia	5	2	2	1	5	3	+2	8	Bronze medal match
Mexico	5	2	1	2	2	4	−2	7	Bronze medal match
Peru	5	1	0	4	3	12	−9	3	
Costa Rica	5	0	0	5	0	10	−10	0	

Source: Summary
2019-08-24
15:00

Argentina	2–0	Costa Rica
	Report

2019-08-24
17:30

Colombia	0–0	Brazil
	Report

2019-08-24
20:00

Mexico	1–0	Peru
	Report

2019-08-25
15:00

Argentina	0–0	Brazil
	Report

2019-08-25
17:30

Colombia	0–0	Mexico
	Report

2019-08-25
20:00

Costa Rica	0–1	Peru
	Report

2019-08-26
15:00

Brazil	3–0	Mexico
	Report

2019-08-26
17:30

Argentina	3–0	Peru
	Report

2019-08-26
20:00

Costa Rica	0–2	Colombia
	Report

2019-08-28
15:00

Argentina	1–0	Mexico
	Report

2019-08-28
17:30

Brazil	4–0	Costa Rica
	Report

2019-08-28
20:00

Peru	2–3	Colombia
	Report

2019-08-29
15:00

Mexico	1–0	Costa Rica
	Report

2019-08-29
17:30

Peru	0–5	Brazil
	Report

2019-08-29
20:00

Argentina	1–0	Colombia
	Report

=== Finals ===
Gold Medal Match
August 30
Argentina	0
Brazil	2

Bronze Medal Match
August 30
Colombia	0
Mexico	1

==== Bronze medal match ====
2019-08-30
14:30

Colombia	0–1	Mexico
	Report

==== Gold medal match ====
2019-08-30
17:00

Argentina	0–2	Brazil
	Report
