= Judo at the 2019 Parapan American Games =

- Venue: VIDENA Sports Center 2
- Dates: August 24 to 25

Judo competitions at the 2019 Parapan American Games in Lima were held from August 24 to 25 at the VIDENA Sports Center 2.

== Medal table ==
* Host nation (Peru)

Rank	Nation	Gold	Silver	Bronze	Total
1	Brazil (BRA)	4	3	4	11
2	Mexico (MEX)	3	0	1	4
3	Argentina (ARG)	1	1	3	5
4	Cuba (CUB)	1	1	1	3
5	Uruguay (URU)	1	0	0	1
6	United States (USA)	0	1	4	5
7	Venezuela (VEN)	0	1	1	2
8	Canada (CAN)	0	1	0	1
8	Colombia (COL)	0	1	0	1
8	Puerto Rico (PUR)	0	1	0	1
11	Jamaica (JAM)	0	0	1	1
11	Peru (PER)*	0	0	1	1
Totals (12 entries)		10	10	16	36

== Medalists ==
=== Men's events ===
Event	Gold	Silver	Bronze
Extra-lightweight (60 kg)	Henry Borges; Uruguay	Marcos Blanco; Venezuela	Ron Hawthrone; United States
Extra-lightweight (60 kg)	Henry Borges; Uruguay	Marcos Blanco; Venezuela	Thiego Marques; Brazil
Half-lightweight (66 kg)	Eduardo Gauto; Argentina	Luiz Perez Diaz; Puerto Rico	Marcos Falcón; Venezuela
Half-lightweight (66 kg)	Eduardo Gauto; Argentina	Luiz Perez Diaz; Puerto Rico	Jose Romero; Cuba
Lightweight (73 kg)	Luan Pimentel; Brazil	Juan Castellanos; Colombia	Rodolfo Ramirez; Argentina
Lightweight (73 kg)	Luan Pimentel; Brazil	Juan Castellanos; Colombia	Raul Oritz; Mexico
Half-middleweight (81 kg)	Eduardo Avila; Mexico	Gerardo Rodriguez; Cuba	Harlley Pereira; Brazil
Half-middleweight (81 kg)	Eduardo Avila; Mexico	Gerardo Rodriguez; Cuba	Antero Villalobos; Peru
Middleweight (90 kg)	Brayan Valencia; Mexico	Artur Cavalcante; Brazil	Richard Ties; United States
Heavyweight (+100 kg)	Yordani Fernandez; Cuba	Ben Goodrich; United States	Theador Subba; Jamaica
Heavyweight (+100 kg)	Yordani Fernandez; Cuba	Ben Goodrich; United States	Antônio Tenório; Brazil

=== Women's events ===
Event	Gold	Silver	Bronze
Half-lightweight (52 kg)	Giulla Pereira; Brazil	Priscilla Gagne; Canada	Karla Cardoso; Brazil
Half-lightweight (52 kg)	Giulla Pereira; Brazil	Priscilla Gagne; Canada	Paula Gómez; Argentina
Lightweight (57 kg)	Lúcia Teixeira; Brazil	Laura Gonzalez; Argentina	None awarded
Middleweight (70 kg)	Lenia Ruvalcaba; Mexico	Alana Martins; Brazil	Christella Garcia; United States
Middleweight (70 kg)	Lenia Ruvalcaba; Mexico	Alana Martins; Brazil	Nadia Boggiano; Argentina
Middleweight (+70 kg)	Meg Emmerich; Brazil	Rebeca de Souza; Brazil	Katie Davis; United States
