= Guyana at the 2019 Parapan American Games =

- IPC code: GUY
- NPC: Guyanese Paralympic Committee

in Lima
- Competitors: 1 in 1 sport
- Medals: Gold 0 Silver 0 Bronze 0 Total 0

Parapan American Games appearances
- 2019; 2023

Guyana competed in the 2019 Parapan American Games in Lima, Peru from 23 August to 1 September. This was Guyana's first appearance at the Parapan American Games.

== Table tennis ==
Guyana will represent one male table tennis player.

Athlete	Event	Preliminaries				Semifinals	Final / BM	
Athlete	Event	Opposition Result	Opposition Result	Opposition Result	Rank	Opposition Result	Opposition Result	Rank
Gibran Hussein	Men's singles C10	Echaveguren (CHI); L 0-3	Puerto (COL); L 0-3	Rivera (PUR); L 1-3	4	did not advance		

== See also ==
- Guyana at the 2019 Pan American Games
