= Football 7-a-side at the 2019 Parapan American Games =

- Venue: Villa María del Triunfo Rugby field
- Dates: 24 – 31 August 2019
- Competitors: 82 from 6 nations
- Teams: 6

Medalists
1st place, gold medalist(s)		Brazil
2nd place, silver medalist(s)		Argentina
3rd place, bronze medalist(s)		United States

7-a-side football at the 2019 Parapan American Games were held in Villa Maria del Triunfo Rugby field, Lima from August 24–31, 2019. There was 1 gold medals in this sport.

== Squads ==
Colombia	Peru	Venezuela
Oscar Amaya Mendez; Omar Banguera; Camilo Garcia Escobar; Freddy Imbachi Santacruz; Alex Marquez Colorado; Didier Pasuy Castano; Ricardo Arnache Jimenez; Jose Chavez Duque; Julian Gomez Buitrago; James Lenis Rincon; Daniel Otero Carabali; Wilmer Sanchez Chamorro	Erick Campos Nunez; Alexander Garcia Samaniego; Lino Ibanez Mejia; Julio Luqui Lagleyze De L Lenin Palomino Grandez; Anthony Ramirez Palacios; Renzo Santiago Loyola; Jose Diaz Quispe; Diego Guzman Reyes; Edinson Llerena Ojanama; Ronald Nazario Ayala; Juan Quinto Uribe; Jaime Regalado Panduro; Edwin Valderrama Rodrigue	Peter Alvarado Gonzalez; Marlon Alexande Bello; Marco Cardenas Nieto; Cristian Moreno Perez; Francisco Perez Gomez; Jose Quintana; Saul Torres Villegas; Enderson Alvarez Artahona; Gabriel Bravo Olivi; Richard Mogollon Melendez; Stewart Ortiz Sira; Yefferson Pernia Duque; Willian Sanchez Gonzalez; Yonfe Zamora Guerra

Brazil	Argentina	United States
Moacir Fernando Silva Mato; João Victor Batista Cortes; Heitor Luiz Ramires Camposano; João Batista De Araujo; Heberte Honório Lemes Oviedo; Leonardo Giovani Morais; Ubirajara Da Silva Magalhães; Evandro De Oliveira Gomes; Jefferson Apare Miranda Cardoso; César Batista De Aguiar; Jan Francisco Brito Da Costa; Wesley Dos Santos; Jefferson Da Silva Delmonde; Lucas Henrique Da Silva	Gonzalo Matías Bacik; Hernando German Romussi; Pablo Matias Molina Lopez; Rodrigo Eloy Lugrin; Carlos Leonardo Carrizo; Mariano Andres Morana; Matías Fernandez Romano; Cristian Nicola Billordo; Duncan Thomas Coronel; Matías Ezequiel Vera; Fabricio Gabriel Alvarez; Matías Salvat; Mariano Cortes; Rodrigo Adolfo Luquez	Sean Boyle; Cameron Delillo; Jacob Crumbley; Tyler Bennett; Benjamin Lindau; Jacob Kaplan; Adam Ballou; Andrew Bremer; Seth Jahn; Nicholas Mayhugh; Shea Hammond; Marc Estrella; Joshua Brunais; David Garza

== Format ==
The first round, or group stage, was a competition between the 6 teams in one group, where engaged in a round-robin tournament within itself. The best two teams play for gold in the finals, the third and fourth place for the third place in the tournament, the fifth and the sixth in the table are the fifth and the sixth of the tournament respectively.

Tie-breaking criteria for group play
The ranking of teams in each group was based on the following criteria:
1. Number of points
2. Goal difference
3. Number of goals scored
4. Number of points obtained in matches between tied teams
5. Goal difference in matches between tied teams
6. Number of goals scored in matches between tied teams
7. Drawing of lots

Classification
Athletes with a physical disability competed. The athlete's disability was caused by a non-progressive brain damage that affects motor control, such as cerebral palsy, traumatic brain injury or stroke. Athletes must be ambulant.

Players were classified by level of disability.

- C5: Athletes with difficulties when walking and running, but not in standing or when kicking the ball.
- C6: Athletes with control and co-ordination problems of their upper limbs, especially when running.
- C7: Athletes with hemiplegia.
- C8: Athletes with minimal disability; must meet eligibility criteria and have an impairment that has impact on the sport of football.

Teams must field at least one class C5 or C6 player at all times. No more than two players of class C8 are permitted to play at the same time.

== Group stage ==
Pos	Team	Pld	W	D	L	GF	GA	GD	Pts	Qualified for
1	Brazil	5	4	0	1	33	3	+30	12	Team play for position 1
2	Argentina	5	4	0	1	25	3	+22	12	Team play for position 1
3	United States	5	4	0	1	24	4	+20	12	Team play for the position 3
4	Venezuela	5	2	0	3	15	29	−14	6	Team play for the position 3
5	Colombia	5	1	0	4	13	18	−5	3	
6	Peru	5	0	0	5	0	53	−53	0	

Source: The results of the table were determined from the results
Rules for classification: Tie-breaking criteria
24 August 2019
9:30

Brazil	10–0	Peru
	Report

Villa María del Triunfo
Referee: Margaret Mary Domka
24 August 2019
11:30

Venezuela	1–7	Argentina
	Report

Villa María del Triunfo
Referee: Adrian Camilo Santa
24 August 2019
13:30

United States	5–0	Colombia
	Report

Villa María del Triunfo
Referee: Jorge Eduardo Barbisan

25 August 2019
9:30

Peru	0–12	Colombia
	Report

Villa María del Triunfo
Referee: Jorge Eduardo Barbisan
25 August 2019
11:30

Venezuela	0–6	United States
	Report

Villa María del Triunfo
Referee: Jhon Rocca Neyra
25 August 2019
13:30

Brazil	5–0	Argentina
	Report

Villa María del Triunfo
Referee: Skye Arthur-Banning

26 August 2019
9:30

Argentina	2–0	United States
	Report

Villa María del Triunfo
Referee: Adrian Camilo Santa
26 August 2019
11:30

Peru	0–12	Venezuela
	Report

Villa María del Triunfo
Referee: Liz Judith Arellano Berrospi
26 August 2019
13:30

Brazil	4–0	Colombia
	Report

Villa María del Triunfo
Referee: Neker Balabarca Espinoza

28 August 2019
9:30

Colombia	1–2	Venezuela
	Report

Villa María del Triunfo
Referee: Margaret Mary Domka
28 August 2019
11:30

Argentina	9–0	Peru
	Report

Villa María del Triunfo
Referee: Adrian Camilo Santa
28 August 2019
13:30

Brazil	2–3	United States
	Report

Villa María del Triunfo
Referee: Jorge Eduardo Barbisana

29 August 2019
9:30

United States	10–0	Peru
	Report

Villa María del Triunfo
Referee: Adrian Camilo Santa
29 August 2019
11:30

Colombia	0–7	Argentina
	Report

Villa María del Triunfo
Referee: Skye Arthur-Banning
29 August 2019
13:30

Brazil	15–0	Venezuela
	Report

Villa María del Triunfo
Referee: Neker Balabarca Espinoza

=== Finals ===
Gold Medal Match
August 31
Argentina	3
Brazil	5

Bronze Medal Match
August 31
United States	7
Venezuela	0

==== Bronze medal match ====
2019-08-31
9:30

United States	7–0	Venezuela
	Report

Villa María del Triunfo
Referee: Adrian Camilo Santa

==== Gold medal match ====
2019-08-31
12:00

Argentina	3–5	Brazil
	Report

Villa María del Triunfo
Referee: Margaret Mary Domka

== Statistics ==
=== Ranking ===
Rank	Team
Gold medal	Brazil
Silver medal	Argentina
Bronze medal	United States
4.	Venezuela
5.	Colombia
6.	Peru
