= Boccia at the 2019 Parapan American Games =

- Venue: Polideportivo Villa El Salvador
- Dates: August 29 to September 1

Boccia competitions at the 2019 Parapan American Games in Lima were held from August 29 to September 1 at the Polideportivo Villa El Salvador. All Boccia competitions were mixed (men and women competed together equally).

== Medal table ==
* Host nation (Peru)

Rank	Nation	Gold	Silver	Bronze	Total
1	Brazil	3	3	1	7
2	Colombia	1	3	1	5
3	Argentina	1	1	1	3
4	Canada	1	0	2	3
5	Mexico	1	0	1	2
Totals (5 entries)		7	7	6	20

== Medalists ==
Event	Gold	Silver	Bronze
Team BC1/BC2	Argentina; Alien Flores; Mauricio Ibarbure; Luis Cristaldo; Jonatan Aquino	Brazil; Maciel Santos; Natali de Faria; José Carlos Oliveira; Guilherme Moraes	Not awarded
Pairs BC3	Brazil; Evelyn Oliveira; Mateus Carvalho; Antônio Leme	Colombia; Carolina Garcia; Jesús Romero; Carlos Tinjaca	Canada; Éric Bussière; Philipp Lord; Marylou Martineau
Pairs BC4	Colombia; Duban Cely; Leidy Chica; Euclides Grisales	Brazil; Eliseu Dos Santos; Marcelo Dos Santos; Ercileide Laurinda	Canada; Alison Levine; Marco Dispaltro; Iulian Ciobanu
Individual BC1	Eduardo Sanchez; Mexico	José Carlos Oliveira; Brazil	Eduardo Ventura; Mexico
Individual BC2	Maciel Santos; Brazil	Luis Cristaldo; Argentina	Jonatan Aquino; Argentina
Individual BC3	Evelyn Oliveira; Brazil	Jesús Romero; Colombia	Mateus Carvalho; Brazil
Individual BC4	Marco Dispaltro; Canada	Euclides Grisales; Colombia	Duban Cely; Colombia
