= Krystal Shaw =

Canadian Paralympic swimmer

Personal information
- Full name: Krystal Leesa Shaw
- Born: 14 February 1994 (age 32) Moose Jaw, Saskatchewan, Canada
- Home town: Vancouver, British Columbia
- Height: 1.40 m (4 ft 7 in)

Sport
- Country: Canada
- Sport: Paralympic swimming
- Disability: Arthrogryposis
- Disability class: S7
- Club: Flatland Swimming Club
- Coached by: Michel Berube; Jeff Toth
Medal record
Paralympic swimming
Representing Canada
Parapan American Games
Silver medal – second place	2019 Lima	Women's 50m freestyle S7
Silver medal – second place	2019 Lima	Women's 100m freestyle S7
Silver medal – second place	2019 Lima	Women's 100m backstroke S7
Bronze medal – third place	2019 Lima	Women's 4x100m medley relay 34pts

Krystal Leesa Shaw (born 14 February 1994) is a Canadian Paralympic swimmer who competes in international level events.

When she was born, she was diagnosed with arthrogryposis and was born with club feet, a dislocated hip and underdeveloped legs. She also had gastroschisis and doctors thought that she would never walk however she did manage to walk after having pins in her leg and a metal frame for six months when she was five years old, after many surgeries she took her first steps aged six years old.

== Swimming career ==
Shaw started swimming aged nine when she had to develop her muscles then started competing in major championships aged fourteen, she won two silver medals in a major competition where she competed against swimmers from her native country, United States and Mexico. She competed for Saskatchewan province team in the Canada Games and won a bronze medal. She participated in Canada's national Paralympic swimming team at the 2009 IPC Swimming World Championships. She had to take a seven-year break after developing a blood clot in her leg and was not allowed to swim. She resumed her career after her long break.

Her highest achievement was competing for Canada at the 2019 Parapan American Games where she won four medals in eight events.
