= Sandrine Bérubé =

Canadian wheelchair basketball player

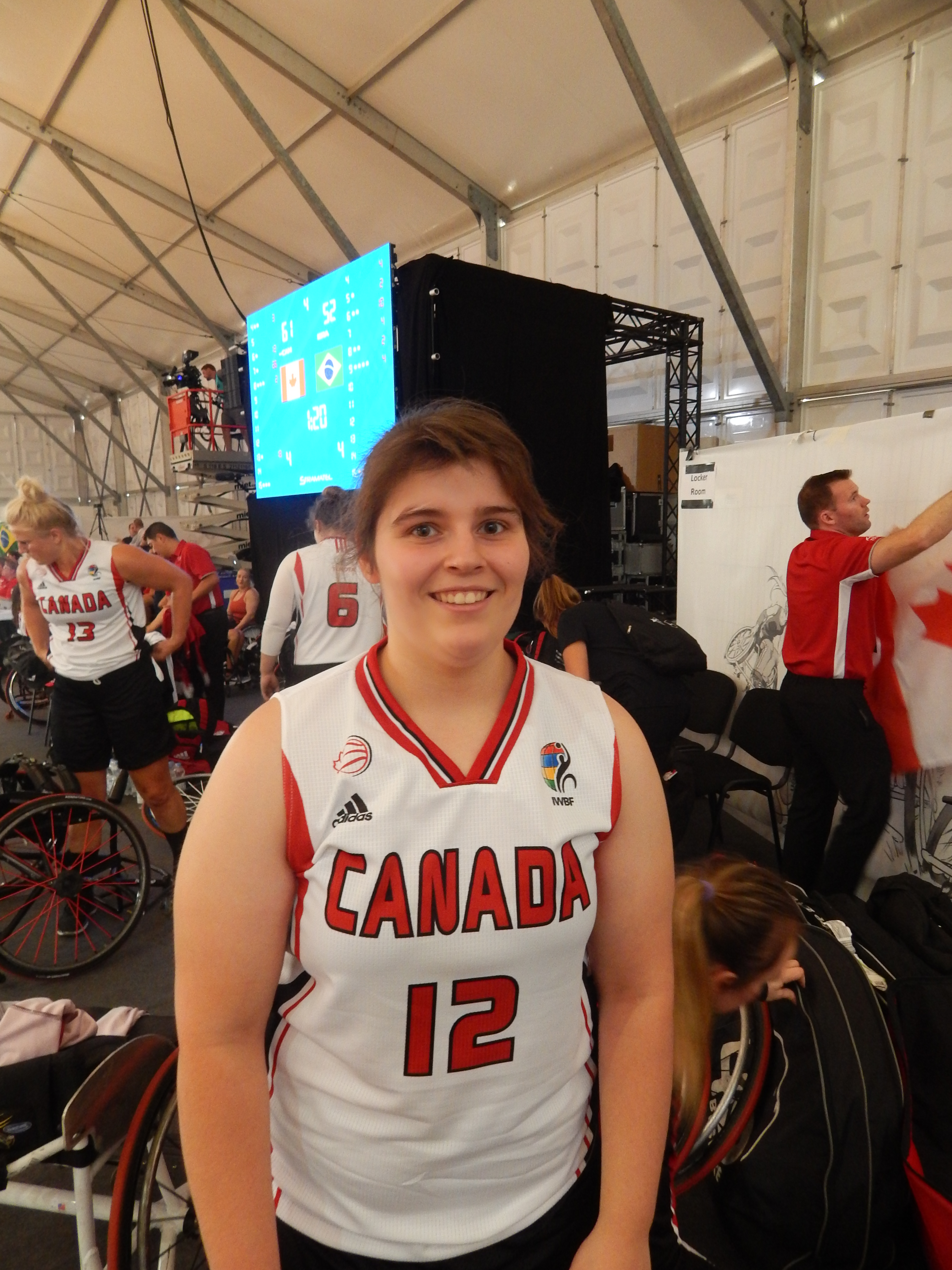
- Team Canada – Sandrine Berube

Personal information
- Nationality: Canada
- Born: February 5, 1999 (age 27) LaSalle, Quebec
- Height: 5 ft 4 in (1.63 m)

Sport
- Sport: Wheelchair basketball
- Disability class: 4.5
- Event: Women's team
Medal record
Women's wheelchair basketball
Representing Canada
Parapan American Games
| Gold medal – first place | 2019 Lima | Team |

Sandrine Bérubé (born February 5, 1999) is a Canadian 4.5 point wheelchair basketball player who has represented Quebec at both the junior and senior levels. In 2018, she was part of the Canadian national women's team for the 2018 Wheelchair Basketball World Championship in Hamburg.

== Biography ==
Sandrine Bérubé was born in LaSalle, Quebec, on February 5, 1999. She played ice hockey, soccer, basketball, and baseball, and is a brown belt in karate. In March 2014 she fell while playing ice hockey that left her with plates and screws in her left leg. Unable to play sports that involved running any more, she took up sledge hockey. She also began playing wheelchair basketball, joining the Valleyfield Mini-Eagles.

From there Bérubé progressed to the CIVA team, and has represented Quebec at both the junior and senior levels. Team Quebec came third at the CWBL Women's National Championship in Burlington, Ontario in 2017, and second in the CWBL Women's National Championship in Richmond, British Columbia, in 2018. In 2018, she was part of the Canadian national women's team for the 2018 Wheelchair Basketball World Championship in Hamburg. The Canadian team came fifth, as they had at the 2016 Paralympic Games two years before.

Bérubé is a graduate of the École secondaire des Patriotes. She was awarded a $2,000 scholarship by the Quebec Foundation for Athletic Excellence in 2017, and was one of 14 recipients of a scholarship in 2018, this time for $3,000.

As of 2018, she is studying physiotherapy technology at Cégep Marie-Victorin.
