= Costa Verde Pan-American Complex =

Sports venue in Lima, Peru

- Complejo Panamericano Costa Verde
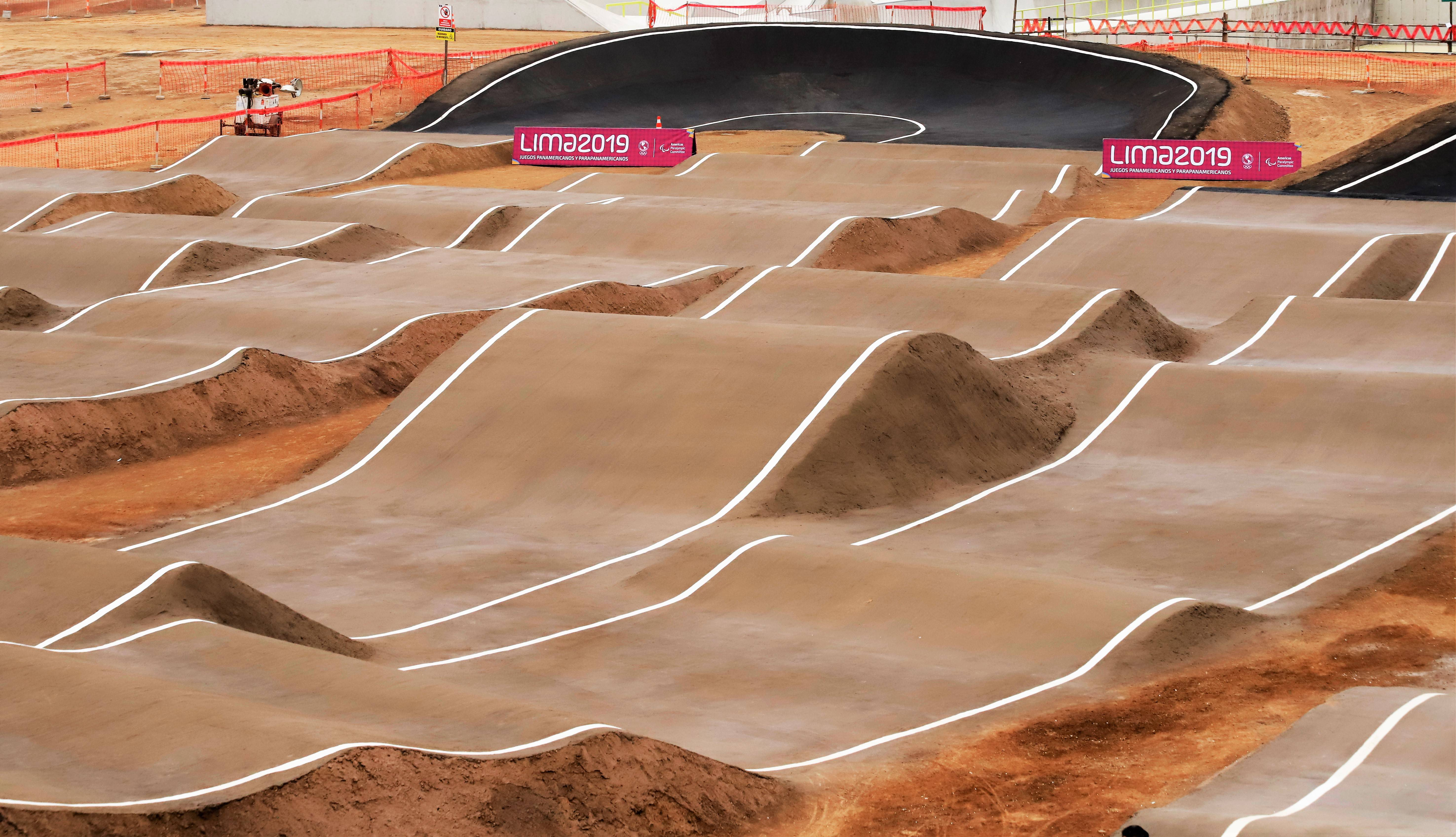
- Interactive map of Costa Verde Pan-American Complex
- Location: San Miguel District, Lima

Construction
- Opened: 17 July 2019
- Years active: 2019–present

The Costa Verde Pan-American Complex (Spanish: Complejo Panamericano Costa Verde), formerly the Costa Verde – San Miguel Park (Spanish: Parque Costa Verde – San Miguel), is a sports venue located on the Costa Verde, in San Miguel District, Lima, Peru. It became the venue for the beach volleyball, BMX cycling, road cycling and speed skating competitions at the 2019 Pan American Games and for adaptive cycling at the Parapan American Games. It is currently managed by the Special Legacy Project.

It is a partially accessible space with paths, ramps, restrooms and accessible seating, serving both athletes and spectators. The capacity of the venues is as follows: BMX circuit (3,000 spectators), main beach volleyball stadium (3,000 spectators), speed skating rink (1,000 spectators) and freestyle BMX track (2,500 spectators).

== Opening ==
On July 17, 2019, the president of the Organizing Committee of the XVIII Pan American Games and Parapan American Games Lima 2019 (COPAL), Carlos Neuhaus, handed over the beach volleyball and speed skating courts of the Costa Verde headquarters in San Miguel, accompanied its Mayor, Juan José Guevara, as well as the head of the Peruvian Skating Federation, Manuel Veaizan and the representative of the Peruvian Volleyball Federation, Ronald Herrera, with whom he toured the facilities.

The beach volleyball competition was the first sport to take place on the venue on July 24, with the match between the women's teams of Canada and Nicaragua.

== See also ==
- Venues of the 2019 Pan American and Parapan American Games
