= Uruguay at the 2019 Parapan American Games =

- Flag of Uruguay
- IPC code: URU

in Lima, Peru August 23, 2019 – September 1, 2019
- Competitors: 5 (5 men and 0 women) in 5 sports
- Medals Ranked 14th: Gold 1 Silver 0 Bronze 1 Total 2

Parapan American Games appearances
- 1999; 2003; 2007; 2011; 2015; 2019; 2023

Uruguay competed at the 2019 Parapan American Games held from August 23 to September 1, 2019 in Lima, Peru. In total, athletes representing Uruguay won one gold medal and one bronze medal. The country finished in 14th place in the medal table.

== Medalists ==
Medal	Name	Sport	Event
Gold	Henry Borges	Judo	Men's 60 kg
Bronze	Gonzalo G. Dutra Irinitz	Swimming	Men's 100m breaststroke SB9

== Athletics ==
Uruguay competed in athletics.

== Judo ==
Henry Borges won the gold medal in the men's 60 kg event.

== Shooting ==
Uruguay competed in shooting.

== Swimming ==
Gonzalo G. Dutra Irinitz won the bronze medal in the men's 100m breaststroke SB9 event.

== Table tennis ==
Uruguay competed in table tennis.
