= El Salvador at the 2019 Parapan American Games =

- Flag of El Salvador
- IPC code: ESA
- NPC: Comité Paralímpico de El Salvador

in Lima, Peru August 23, 2019 – September 1, 2019
- Medals Ranked 15th: Gold 1 Silver 0 Bronze 0 Total 1

Parapan American Games appearances
- 1999; 2003; 2007; 2011; 2015; 2019; 2023

El Salvador competed at the 2019 Parapan American Games held from August 23 to September 1, 2019, in Lima, Peru. Athletes representing El Salvador won one gold medal in total and the country finished in 15th place in the medal table.

== Medalists ==
Medal	Name	Sport	Event
Gold	Herbert Aceituno	Powerlifting	Men's 65 kg

== Athletics ==
El Salvador competed in athletics.

== Boccia ==
El Salvador competed in boccia.

== Powerlifting ==
Herbert Aceituno won the gold medal in the men's 65kg event. He also won the Best Male Athlete of Lima 2019 award.

== Swimming ==
El Salvador competed in swimming.

== Table tennis ==
El Salvador competed in table tennis.

== Wheelchair tennis ==
El Salvador competed in wheelchair tennis.
