= Puerto Rico at the 2019 Parapan American Games =

Competition

- Flag of Puerto Rico
- IPC code: PUR

in Lima, Peru August 23, 2019 – September 1, 2019
- Competitors: 22 (21 men and 1 woman) in 7 sports
- Medals Ranked 19th: Gold 0 Silver 3 Bronze 0 Total 3

Parapan American Games appearances
- 1999; 2003; 2007; 2011; 2015; 2019; 2023

Puerto Rico competed at the 2019 Parapan American Games held from August 23 to September 1, 2019 in Lima, Peru. In total, athletes representing Puerto Rico won three silver medals and the country finished in 19th place in the medal table.

== Medalists ==
Medal	Name	Sport	Event
Silver	Luiz Perez Diaz	Judo	Men's 66 kg
Silver	Carmelo Rivera Fuentes	Athletics	Men's 1500 metres T20
Silver	Darvin Baez Eliza	Swimming	Men's 100m breaststroke SB12

== Athletics ==
Carmelo Rivera Fuentes won the silver medal in the men's 1500 metres T20 event.

== Judo ==
Luiz Perez Diaz won the silver medal in the men's 66 kg event.

== Swimming ==
Darvin Baez Eliza won the silver medal in the men's 100m breaststroke SB12 event.
