= Costa Rica at the 2019 Parapan American Games =

- Flag of Costa Rica
- IPC code: CRC

in Lima, Peru August 23, 2019 – September 1, 2019
- Medals Ranked 18th: Gold 0 Silver 3 Bronze 1 Total 4

Parapan American Games appearances
- 1999; 2003; 2007; 2011; 2015; 2019; 2023

Costa Rica competed at the 2019 Parapan American Games held from August 23 to September 1, 2019 in Lima, Peru. In total, athletes representing Costa Rica won three silver medals and one bronze medal. The country finished in 18th place in the medal table.

== Medalists ==
Medal	Name	Sport	Event
Silver	Henry Raabe	Cycling	Men's road race C 1–3
Silver	Camila Haase Quiros	Swimming	Women's 100 m breaststroke SB8
Silver	Steven Roman	Table tennis	Men's singles C8
Bronze	Andres Molina	Taekwondo	Men's -75 kg

== Cycling ==
Henry Raabe won the silver medal in the men's road race C 1–3.

== Swimming ==
Camila Haase Quiros won the silver medal in the women's 100 m breaststroke SB8 event.

== Table tennis ==
Steven Roman won the silver medal in the men's singles C8 event.

== Taekwondo ==
Andres Molina won one of the bronze medals in the men's -75 kg event.
