= Guatemala at the 2019 Parapan American Games =

- Flag of Guatemala
- IPC code: GUA
- NPC: Comité Paralimpico Guatemalteco

in Lima, Peru August 23, 2019 – September 1, 2019
- Medals Ranked 15th: Gold 1 Silver 0 Bronze 0 Total 1

Parapan American Games appearances
- 2007; 2011; 2015; 2019; 2023

Guatemala competed at the 2019 Parapan American Games held from August 23 to September 1, 2019 in Lima, Peru. Athletes representing Guatemala won one gold medal in total and the country finished in 15th place in the medal table.

== Medalists ==
Medal	Name	Sport	Event
Gold	Raúl Anguiano	Badminton	Men's singles SL4

== Badminton ==
Raúl Anguiano won the gold medal in the men's singles SL4 event. He was also nominated for Best Male Athlete of Lima 2019 and he finished in second place for that award. Anguiano's win was also Guatemala’s first Parapan American title.
