= Mexico at the 2019 Parapan American Games =

- Flag of Mexico
- IPC code: MEX
- NPC: Federacion Mexicana de Deporte

in Lima, Peru August 23, 2019 – September 1, 2019
- Medals Ranked 3rd: Gold 55 Silver 58 Bronze 45 Total 158

Parapan American Games appearances
- 1999; 2003; 2007; 2011; 2015; 2019; 2023

Mexico competed at the 2019 Parapan American Games held from August 23 to September 1, 2019, in Lima, Peru. In total, athletes representing Mexico won 55 gold medals, 58 silver medals and 45 bronze medals and the country finished 3rd in the medal table.

== Athletics ==
Athletes representing Mexico won 16 gold medals, 16 silver medals and 18 bronze medals.

== Boccia ==
Eduardo Sanchez won the gold medal in the individual BC1 event and Eduardo Ventura won the bronze medal in that event.

== Judo ==
Eduardo Avila won the gold medal in the men's half-middleweight (81 kg) event.

Brayan Valencia won the gold medal in the men's middleweight (90 kg) event.

Lenia Ruvalcaba won the gold medal in the women's middleweight (70 kg) event.

Raul Oritz won a bronze medal in the men's lightweight (73 kg) event.

== Table tennis ==
Table tennis players representing Mexico won three gold medals and three silver medals.

Víctor Reyes won the gold medal in the men's singles C2 event.

Miguel Vazquez won the silver medal in the men's singles C9 event.

Maria Sigala won the gold medal in the women's singles C2-3 event.

Martha Verdin won the silver medal in the women's singles C4 event.

Claudia Perez won the gold medal in the women's singles C7 event.

Mexican table tennis players also won the silver medal in the women's team C2-5 event.

== Wheelchair basketball ==
Mexico competed in both the men's tournament and the women's tournament.
