= Brazil at the 2019 Parapan American Games =

- IPC code: BRA
- NPC: Brazilian Paralympic Committee

in Lima, Peru
- Competitors: 316 in 17 sports
- Flag bearer (opening): Leomon Moreno
- Flag bearer (closing): Maciel Santos
- Officials: 31
- Medals Ranked 1st: Gold 124 Silver 99 Bronze 85 Total 308

Parapan American Games appearances (overview)
- 1999; 2003; 2007; 2011; 2015; 2019; 2023

Brazil competed in the 2019 Parapan American Games from 23 August to 1 September.

== Medalists ==
Medals by sport
Sport	1st place, gold medalist(s)	2nd place, silver medalist(s)	3rd place, bronze medalist(s)	Total
Swimming	53	44	29	126
Athletics	33	27	24	84
Table tennis	9	6	9	24
Powerlifting	6	3	7	16
Badminton	4	4	2	10
Judo	4	3	3	10
Boccia	3	3	1	7
Cycling	3	1	4	8
Shooting	2	5	3	10
Taekwondo	2	2	1	5
Goalball	2	0	0	2
Sitting volleyball	1	1	0	2
Football 5-a-side	1	0	0	1
Football 7-a-side	1	0	0	1
Wheelchair basketball	0	0	1	1
Wheelchair tennis	0	0	1	1
Total	124	99	85	308

== Shooting ==
There will be eight sports shooters participating.

== See also ==
- Brazil at the 2020 Summer Paralympics
- Brazil at the 2019 Pan American Games
