= Colombia at the 2019 Parapan American Games =

- Flag of Colombia
- IPC code: COL
- NPC: Colombian Paralympic Committee
- Website: www.comiteparalimpicocolombiano.org

in Lima, Peru August 23, 2019 – September 1, 2019
- Medals Ranked 4th: Gold 47 Silver 36 Bronze 50 Total 133

Parapan American Games appearances
- 1999; 2003; 2007; 2011; 2015; 2019; 2023

Colombia competed at the 2019 Parapan American Games held from August 23 to September 1, 2019 in Lima, Peru. In total, athletes representing Colombia won 47 gold medals, 36 silver medals and 50 bronze medals and the country finished in 4th place in the medal table.

== Athletics ==
In total, athletes representing Colombia won 10 gold medals, 11 silver medals and 14 bronze medals.

Yesenia Restrepo won the silver medal in the women's discus throw F11 event.

== Boccia ==
In total, one gold medal, three silver medals and one bronze medal were won.

== Judo ==
Juan Castellanos won the silver medal in the men's lightweight (73 kg) event.

== Shooting ==
María Restrepo won the bronze medal in the women's 10 metre air pistol SH1 event.

== Sitting volleyball ==
The men's team competed in sitting volleyball at the 2019 Parapan American Games.

== Table tennis ==
Table tennis players representing Colombia won six bronze medals in total.

Jose Vargas won the bronze medal in the men's individual C7 event.

Diego Henao won a bronze medal in the men's individual C8 event.

Bronze medals were also won the men's team C6-8 and men's team C9-10 events.

Manuela Guapi won a bronze medal in the women's individual C4 event.

A bronze medal was also won in the women's team C2-5 event.

== Wheelchair basketball ==
The men's team won the bronze medal in wheelchair basketball.

The women's team finished in 6th place.

== Wheelchair rugby ==
Colombia won the bronze medal in the mixed tournament.

== Wheelchair tennis ==
Angélica Bernal won the gold medal in the women's singles event. Bernal and Johana Martínez won the silver medal in the women's doubles event.
