= United States at the 2020 Summer Paralympics =

- IPC code: USA
- NPC: United States Paralympic Committee

in Tokyo
- Competitors: 234 in 20 sports
- Flag bearers: Chuck Aoki and Melissa Stockwell
- Medals Ranked 3rd: Gold 37 Silver 36 Bronze 31 Total 104

Summer Paralympics appearances (overview)
- 1960; 1964; 1968; 1972; 1976; 1980; 1984; 1988; 1992; 1996; 2000; 2004; 2008; 2012; 2016; 2020; 2024

The United States competed at the 2020 Summer Paralympics in Tokyo, Japan from 24 August to 5 September 2021.

== Medalists ==
Medal	Name	Sport	Event	Date
Gold	Anastasia Pagonis	Swimming	Women's 400 metre freestyle S11	26 August
Gold	Gia Pergolini	Swimming	Women's 100 metre backstroke S13	26 August
Gold	Robert Griswold	Swimming	Men's 100 metre backstroke S8	27 August
Gold	Roxanne Trunnell on Dolton	Equestrian	Individual championship test grade I	27 August
Gold	Mallory Weggemann	Swimming	Women's 200 metre individual medley SM7	27 August
Gold	Nick Mayhugh	Athletics	Men's 100 metres T37	27 August
Gold	Allysa Seely	Paratriathlon	Women's PTS2	28 August
Gold	Brad Snyder; Guide: Greg Billington	Paratriathlon	Men's PTVI	28 August
Gold	Susannah Scaroni	Athletics	Women's 5000 metres T54	28 August
Gold	Ian Seidenfeld	Table tennis	Men's individual class 6	28 August
Gold	Jessica Long	Swimming	Women's 200 metre individual medley SM8	28 August
Gold	Kendall Gretsch	Paratriathlon	Women's PTWC	29 August
Gold	Daniel Romanchuk	Athletics	Men's 400 metres T54	29 August
Gold	McKenzie Coan	Swimming	Women's 400 metre freestyle S7	29 August
Gold	Roderick Townsend	Athletics	Men's high jump T47	29 August
Gold	Mallory Weggemann	Swimming	Women's 100 metre backstroke S7	30 August
Gold	Hannah Aspden	Swimming	Women's 100 metre backstroke S9	30 August
Gold	Roxanne Trunnell on Dolton	Equestrian	Individual freestyle test grade I	30 August
Gold	Shawn Morelli	Cycling	Women's road time trial C4	31 August
Gold	Oksana Masters	Cycling	Women's road time trial H4–5	31 August
Gold	Morgan Stickney	Swimming	Women's 400 metre freestyle S8	31 August
Gold	Mikaela Jenkins	Swimming	Women's 100 metre butterfly S10	31 August
Gold	Sam Grewe	Athletics	Men's high jump T63	31 August
Gold	Breanna Clark	Athletics	Women's 400 metres T20	31 August
Gold	Oksana Masters	Cycling	Women's road race H5	1 September
Gold	Hannah Aspden; Mikaela Jenkins; Jessica Long; Morgan Stickney	Swimming	Women's 4 × 100 metre medley relay	2 September
Gold	Jeremy Campbell	Athletics	Men's discus throw F64	2 September
Gold	Raymond Martin	Athletics	Men's 100 metres T52	3 September
Gold	Elizabeth Marks	Swimming	Women's 100 metre backstroke S6	3 September
Gold	Robert Griswold	Swimming	Men's 100 metre butterfly S8	3 September
Gold	Jessica Long	Swimming	Women's 100 metre butterfly S8	3 September
Gold	Evan Austin	Swimming	Men's 50 metre butterfly S7	3 September
Gold	Noah Malone; Brittni Mason; Nick Mayhugh; Tatyana McFadden	Athletics	Mixed 4 × 100 metres relay	3 September
Gold	Kevin Mather	Archery	Men's individual recurve open	3 September
Gold	Nick Mayhugh	Athletics	Men's 200 metres T37	4 September
Gold	United States women's national sitting volleyball team: Lora Webster; Bethany Zummo; Alexis Shifflett; Kathryn Holloway; Heather Erickson; Monique Matthews; Whitney Dosty; Jillian Williams; Emma Schieck; Nichole Millage; Kaleo Maclay; Annie Flood	Sitting volleyball	Women's tournament	5 September
Gold	Men's wheelchair basketball team: Jorge Sánchez; Jacob Williams; Joshua Turek; Michael Paye; Matt Lesperance; Ryan Neiswender; Brian Bell; Matt Scott; Steve Serio; Nate Hinze; Trevon Jenifer; John Boie	Wheelchair basketball	Men's tournament	5 September
Silver	Shawn Morelli	Cycling	Women's individual pursuit C4	25 August
Silver	Elizabeth Marks	Swimming	Women's 50 metre freestyle S6	25 August
Silver	Ahalya Lettenberger	Swimming	Women's 200 metre individual medley SM7	27 August
Silver	Raymond Martin	Athletics	Men's 400 metres T52	27 August
Silver	Lex Gillette	Athletics	Men's long jump T11	27 August
Silver	Hailey Danz	Paratriathlon	Women's PTS2	28 August
Silver	Liza Corso	Athletics	Women's 1500 metres T13	28 August
Silver	Grace Norman	Paratriathlon	Women's PTS5	29 August
Silver	Allie Reilly; Danielle Hansen; Charley Nordin; John Tanguay; Karen Petrik	Rowing	Mixed coxed four	29 August
Silver	Men's wheelchair rugby team	Wheelchair rugby	Men's tournament	29 August
Silver	Ben Goodrich	Judo	Men's 100 kg	29 August
Silver	Tatyana McFadden	Athletics	Women's 800 metres T54	29 August
Silver	Raymond Martin	Athletics	Men's 1500 metres T52	29 August
Silver	Jaleen Roberts	Athletics	Women's long jump T37	29 August
Silver	Dallas Wise	Athletics	Men's high jump T47	29 August
Silver	Noah Malone	Athletics	Men's 100 metres T12	29 August
Silver	Hagan Landry	Athletics	Men's shot put F41	30 August
Silver	Leanne Smith	Swimming	Women's 100 metre freestyle S3	30 August
Silver	Colleen Young	Swimming	Women's 200 metre individual medley SM13	30 August
Silver	Aaron Keith	Cycling	Men's road time trial C1	31 August
Silver	Roderick Townsend	Athletics	Men's long jump T47	31 August
Silver	Jessica Long	Swimming	Women's 400 metre freestyle S8	31 August
Silver	McKenzie Coan	Swimming	Women's 100 metre freestyle S7	31 August
Silver	Brittni Mason	Athletics	Women's 100 metres T47	31 August
Silver	Nick Mayhugh	Athletics	Men's 400 metres T37	1 September
Silver	Jessica Long	Swimming	Women's 100 metre breaststroke SB7	1 September
Silver	David Henry Abrahams	Swimming	Men's 100 metre breaststroke SB13	1 September
Silver	Noah Malone	Athletics	Men's 400 metres T12	2 September
Silver	Jaleen Roberts	Athletics	Women's 100 metres T37	2 September
Silver	Elizabeth Smith	Swimming	Women's 100 metre butterfly S9	2 September
Silver	Cheri Madsen	Athletics	Women's 400 metres T54	2 September
Silver	Mallory Weggemann	Swimming	Women's 50 metre butterfly S7	3 September
Silver	United States women's national goalball team: Lisa Czechowski; Asya Miller; Amanda Dennis; Mindy Cook; Eliana Mason; Marybai Huking	Goalball	Women's tournament	3 September
Silver	Cassie Mitchell	Athletics	Women's club throw F51	3 September
Silver	Steven Haxton	Paracanoeing	Men's VL2	4 September
Silver	Brittni Mason	Athletics	Women's 200 metres T47	4 September
Bronze	Jessica Long	Swimming	Women's 100 metre backstroke S8	27 August
Bronze	Tatyana McFadden	Athletics	Women's 5000 metres T54	28 August
Bronze	Jenson Van Emburgh	Table tennis	Men's individual class 3	28 August
Bronze	Sophia Herzog	Swimming	Women's 100 metre breaststroke SB6	28 August
Bronze	Evan Austin	Swimming	Men's 400 metre freestyle S7	29 August
Bronze	Julia Gaffney	Swimming	Women's 400 metre freestyle S7	29 August
Bronze	Jamal Hill	Swimming	Men's 50 metre freestyle S9	29 August
Bronze	Susannah Scaroni	Athletics	Women's 800 metres T54	29 August
Bronze	Roxanne Trunnell; Rebecca Hart; Kate Shoemaker	Equestrian	Team	29 August
Bronze	Elizabeth Marks	Swimming	Women's 50 metre butterfly S6	30 August
Bronze	Anastasia Pagonis	Swimming	Women's 200 metre individual medley SM11	30 August
Bronze	Hannah Aspden	Swimming	Women's 100 metre backstroke S9	30 August
Bronze	Matthew Torres	Swimming	Men's 400 metre freestyle S8	31 August
Bronze	Kym Crosby	Athletics	Women's 100 metres T13	31 August
Bronze	Deja Young	Athletics	Women's 100 metres T47	31 August
Bronze	Joshua Cinnamo	Athletics	Men's shot put F46	1 September
Bronze	Alicia Dana	Cycling	Women's road race H1–4	1 September
Bronze	Colleen Young	Swimming	Women's 100 metre breaststroke SB13	1 September
Bronze	Cheri Madsen	Athletics	Women's 100 metres T54	1 September
Bronze	Trenten Merrill	Athletics	Men's long jump T64	1 September
Bronze	Jill Walsh	Cycling	Women's road race T1–2	2 September
Bronze	Ryan Pinney; Alicia Dana; Alfredo de los Santos	Cycling	Mixed team relay H1–5	2 September
Bronze	Justin Phongsavanh	Athletics	Men's javelin throw F54	3 September
Bronze	Hunter Woodhall	Athletics	Men's 400 metres T62	3 September
Bronze	Alexa Halko	Athletics	Women's 800 metres T34	4 September
Bronze	Kym Crosby	Athletics	Women's 400 metres T13	4 September
Bronze	Isaac Jean-Paul	Athletics	Men's long jump T13	4 September
Bronze	Women's wheelchair basketball team: Alejandra Ibáñez; Abigail Bauleke; Zoe Voris; Darlene Hunter; Josie Aslakson; Natalie Schneider; Rose Hollermann; Kaitlyn Eaton; Lindsey Zurbrugg; Bailey Moody; Ixhelt González; Courtney Ryan	Wheelchair basketball	Women's tournament	5 September
Bronze	Jarryd Wallace	Athletics	Men's 200 meters T64	4 September
Bronze	Evan Medell	Taekwondo	Men's +75 kg	4 September
Bronze	Daniel Romanchuk	Athletics	Men's marathon T54	5 September

== Archery ==
Eric Bennett, Lia Coryell, Kevin Mather, KJ Polish, Emma Rose Ravish, Andre Shelby and Matt Stutzman have all qualified.

=== Men ===
Athlete	Event	Ranking round		Round of 64	Round of 32	Round of 16	Quarterfinals	Semifinals	Final	
Athlete	Event	Result	Rank	Opposition Result	Opposition Result	Opposition Result	Opposition Result	Opposition Result	Opposition Result	Rank
KJ Polish	Men's individual compound open	687	13	Bye	Forsberg (FIN); L 143-145	Did not advance				
Andre Shelby	Men's individual compound open	675	25	Bye	Milne (AUS); W 143-141	Turan (TUR); L 138-142	Did not advance			
Matt Stutzman	Men's individual compound open	688	12	Bye	Swami (IND); W 142-139	Pavlík (SVK); L 137-143	Did not advance			
Eric Bennett	Men's individual recurve open	608	15	—N/a	Kenton-Smith (AUS); W 6-4	Zhao (CHN); L 4-6	Did not advance			
Kevin Mather	Men's individual recurve open	606	17	—N/a	Patru (ROU); W 7-3	Rahimi (IRI); W 6-5	Savaş (TUR); W 6-2	Singh (IND); W 6-4	Zhao (CHN); W 6-4	1st place, gold medalist(s)

=== Women ===
Athlete	Event	Ranking round		Round of 32	Round of 16	Quarterfinals	Semifinals	Final / BM	
Athlete	Event	Score	Seed	Opposition Score	Opposition Score	Opposition Score	Opposition Score	Opposition Score	Rank
Lia Coryell	Women's individual compound W1	596	5	—N/a	Danabaş (TUR); W 126-115	Kim (KOR); W 127-125	Chen (CHN); L 126-137	Rumary (GBR); L 123-131	4
Emma Rose Ravish	Women's individual recurve open	492	22	Dervogics (BRA); L 4-6	Did not advance				

=== Mixed ===
Athlete	Event	Ranking round		Round of 16	Quarterfinals	Semifinals	Final	
Athlete	Event	Result	Rank	Opposition Result	Opposition Result	Opposition Result	Opposition Result	Rank
Eric Bennett; Emma Rose Ravish	Team recurve open	1100	13	RPC (RPC); L 2-6	Did not advance			

== Athletics ==
35 male athletes and 26 female athletes have been selected to compete.

Men's track

Athlete	Event	Heats		Semi-final		Final	
Athlete	Event	Result	Rank	Result	Rank	Result	Rank
David Brown	100 m T11	11.34	2 q	11.50	4	Did not advance	
Noah Malone	100 m T12	10.55 AR	1 Q	—N/a		10.66	2nd place, silver medalist(s)
Isaac Jean-Paul	100 m T13	10.86	2 Q	—N/a		10.83	4
Zackery Marshall	100 m T35	—N/a		—N/a		13.08	7
Nicholas Mayhugh	100 m T37	10.97 WR	1 Q	—N/a		10.95 WR	1st place, gold medalist(s)
Roderick Townsend-Roberts	100 m T47	11.22	12	—N/a		Did not advance	
Tanner Wright	100 m T47	11.14	3 Q	—N/a		11.21	7
Gianfranco Iannotta	100 m T52	—N/a		—N/a		18.08	6
Raymond Martin	100 m T52	—N/a		—N/a		16.99	1st place, gold medalist(s)
Isaiah Rigo	100 m T52	—N/a		—N/a		18.98	7
Brian Siemann	100 m T53	15.32	5	—N/a		Did not advance	
Erik Hightower	100 m T54	14.33	4	—N/a		Did not advance	
Jonathan Gore	100 m T64	11.20	4 q	—N/a		11.08	7
Jarryd Wallace	100 m T64	11.21	4 q	—N/a		11.04	6
Hunter Woodhall	100 m T64	11.17	3 Q	—N/a		11.28	8
Marshall Zackery	200 m T35	—N/a		—N/a		27.73	7
Nicholas Mayhugh	200 m T37	22.26 WR	1 Q	—N/a		21.91 WR	1st place, gold medalist(s)
Luis Puertas	200 m T61	—N/a		—N/a		25.40 AR	4
Regas Woods	200 m T61	—N/a		—N/a		26.74 SB	5
Jonathan Gore	200 m T64	22.62 PB	3 Q	—N/a		22.66	4
Trenten Merrill	200 m T64	DQ		—N/a		Did not advance	
Jarryd Wallace	200 m T64	22.18 SB	2 Q	—N/a		22.09 SB	3rd place, bronze medalist(s)
Noah Malone	400 m T12	48.50	Q	—N/a		47.93 AR	2nd place, silver medalist(s)
Joel Gomez	400 m T13	52.06	6	—N/a		Did not advance	
Nicholas Mayhugh	400 m T37	—N/a		—N/a		50.26	2nd place, silver medalist(s)
Rayven Sample	400 m T47	50.01	3 Q	—N/a		DQ	
Tanner Wright	400 m T47	50.10	2 Q	—N/a		49.36	4
Gianfranco Iannotta	400 m T52	1:00.98	2 Q	—N/a		1:00.57	4
Raymond Martin	400 m T52	57.70	1 Q	—N/a		1:00.57	2nd place, silver medalist(s)
Isaiah Rigo	400 m T52	1:01.75	3 Q	—N/a		DQ	
Joshua George	400 m T53	52.24	4	—N/a		Did not advance	
Brian Siemann	400 m T53	49.74	5 Q	—N/a		49.61	4
Daniel Romanchuk	400 m T54	45.31	1 Q	—N/a		45.72	1st place, gold medalist(s)
Nick Rogers	400 m T62	—N/a		—N/a		52.98	6
Hunter Woodhall	400 m T62	—N/a		—N/a		48.61	3rd place, bronze medalist(s)
Joshusa George	800 m T53	1:55.33	5	—N/a		Did not advance	
Brian Siemann	800 m T53	1:41.52	5 q	—N/a		1:47.18	8
Daniel Romanchuk	800 m T54	1:31.83	1 Q	—N/a		1:34.48	4
Aaron Pike	800 m T54	1:36.48	3	—N/a		Did not advance	
Joel Gomez	1500 m T13	—N/a		—N/a		4.02.41	10
Michael Brannigan	1500 m T20	—N/a		—N/a		3:58.43	4
Raymond Martin	1500 m T52	—N/a		—N/a		3:29.72 AR	2nd place, silver medalist(s)
Isaiah Rigo	1500 m T52	—N/a		—N/a		3:59.42	7
Aaron Pike	1500 m T54	2.57.49	9	—N/a		Did not advance	
Daniel Romanchuk	1500 m T54	2.55.83	3 Q	—N/a		2.50.86 AR	5
Brian Siemann	1500 m T54	3:03.84	6	—N/a		Did not advance	
Aaron Pike	5000 m T54	10:16.48	5	—N/a		Did not advance	
Daniel Romanchuk	5000 m T54	9:53.38	2 Q	—N/a		10:30.50	4
Brian Siemann	5000 m T54	10:20.64	6	—N/a		Did not advance	
Aaron Pike	Marathon T54	—N/a		—N/a		1:29:45	6
Daniel Romanchuk	Marathon T54	—N/a		—N/a		1:29:05	3rd place, bronze medalist(s)
Brian Siemann	Marathon T54	—N/a		—N/a		1:44:42	15

Women's track

Athlete	Event	Heats		Final	
Athlete	Event	Result	Rank	Result	Rank
Kym Crosby	100 m T13	12.07	1 Q	12.08	3rd place, bronze medalist(s)
Erin Kerkhoff	100 m T13	12.99	5	Did not advance	
Taylor Talbot	100 m T13	13.33	5	Did not advance	
Alexa Halko	100 m T34	—N/a		19.57	6
Eva Houston	100 m T34	—N/a		19.82	8
Jaleen Roberts	100 m T37	13.41 AR	2 Q	13.16 AR	2nd place, silver medalist(s)
Brittni Mason	100 m T47	12.07	1 Q	11.97	2nd place, silver medalist(s)
Deja Young	100 m T47	12.26	2 Q	12.21	3rd place, bronze medalist(s)
Yen Hoang	100 m T53	—N/a		18.01	9
Kelsey LeFevour	100 m T53	—N/a		17.56	8
Hannah Dederick	100 m T54	16.21	2 Q	16.36	4
Cheri Madsen	100 m T54	16.60	2 Q	16.33	3rd place, bronze medalist(s)
Noelle Lambert	100 m T63	16.20 AR	Q	15.97 AR	6
Femita Ayanbeku	100 m T64	13.67	5	Did not advance	
Beatriz Hatz	100 m T64	13.26	3 Q	13.31	6
Sydney Barta	100 m T64	13.48	6	Did not advance	
Jaleen Roberts	200 m T37	28.07	3 Q	28.02 AR	6
Brittni Mason	200 m T47	25.22	2 Q	25.00	2nd place, silver medalist(s)
Deja Young	200 m T47	25.64	3 q	25.53	5
Femita Ayanbeku	200 m T64	28.64	4	Did not advance	
Sydney Barta	200 m T64	26.87	3 Q	27.00	4
Beatriz Hatz	200 m T64	27.39	4 q	27.18	6
Kym Crosby	400 m T13	58.14	3 Q	56.79	3rd place, bronze medalist(s)
Erin Kerkhoff	400 m T13	58.30	2 Q	58.06	8
Taylor Talbot	400 m T13	1:04.76	4	Did not advance	
Breanna Clark	400 m T20	56.07	1 Q	55.18 WR	1st place, gold medalist(s)
Danielle Aravich	400 m T47	1:03.76	5	Did not advance	
Yen Hoang	400 m T53	1:00.58	5	Did not advance	
Kelsey LeFevour	400 m T53	1:04.88	6	Did not advance	
Chelsea McClammer	400 m T53	59.66	4 q	59.45	7
Hannah Dederick	400 m T54	57.77	6	Did not advance	
Cheri Madsen	400 m T54	53.16	1 Q	53.91	2nd place, silver medalist(s)
Tatyana McFadden	400 m T54	53.81	2 Q	54.35	4
Alexa Halko	800 m T34	N/A		2:02.22	3rd place, bronze medalist(s)
Eva Houston	800 m T34	N/A		2:21.21	6
Yen Hoang	800 m T53	1:51.49	3 Q	1:52.40	8
Chelsea McClammer	800 m T53	1:52.69	5 q	1:51.19	6
Tatyana McFadden	800 m T54	1:52.91	1 Q	1:43.16	2nd place, silver medalist(s)
Amanda McGrory	800 m T54	1:51.67	3 Q	1:52.59	6
Susannah Scaroni	800 m T54	1:51.42	2 Q	1:44.43	3rd place, bronze medalist(s)
Liza Corso	1500 m T13	4:52.42	4 Q	4:30.67	2nd place, silver medalist(s)
Jenna Fesemyer	1500 m T54	3:37.56	6	Did not advance	
Tatyana McFadden	1500 m T54	3:36.24	1 Q	3:28.64	5
Susannah Scaroni	1500 m T54	3:23.42	1 Q	3:35.53	9
Jenna Fesemyer	5000 m T54	—N/a		11:17.24	7
Tatyana McFadden	5000 m T54	—N/a		11:15.13	3rd place, bronze medalist(s)
Susannah Scaroni	5000 m T54	—N/a		10:52.57 PR	1st place, gold medalist(s)
Jenna Fesemyer	Marathon T54	—N/a		1:41:04	6
Tatyana McFadden	Marathon T54	—N/a		1:40:14	5
Amanda McGrory	Marathon T54	—N/a		1:57:11	15
Susannah Scaroni	Marathon T54	—N/a		1:50:06	11

Mixed track

Athletes	Event	Result	Rank
Noah Malone; Brittni Mason; Nick Mayhugh; Tatyana McFadden	Universal 4 × 100 m relay	45.52 WR	1st place, gold medalist(s)

Men's field

Athlete	Event	Result	Rank
Lex Gillette	Long jump T11	6.17	2nd place, silver medalist(s)
Isaac Jean-Paul	Long jump T13	6.93	3rd place, bronze medalist(s)
Tobi Fawehinmi	Long jump T47	7.09	6
Roderick Townsend-Roberts	Long jump T47	7.43 PB	2nd place, silver medalist(s)
Dallas Wise	Long jump T47	7.30	4
Ezra Frech	Long jump T63	5.85	8
Regas Woods	Long jump T63	4.86	10
Trenten Merrill	Long jump T64	7.08 AR	3rd place, bronze medalist(s)
Roderick Townsend-Roberts	High jump T47	2.15 WR	1st place, gold medalist(s)
Dallas Wise	High jump T47	2.06	2nd place, silver medalist(s)
Sam Grewe	High jump T63	1.88	1st place, gold medalist(s)
Ezra Frech	High jump T63	1.80 PB	5
Hagan Landry	Shot put F41	13.88 AR	2nd place, silver medalist(s)
Josh Cinnamo	Shot put F46	15.90	3rd place, bronze medalist(s)
Scot Severn	Shot put F53	7.36	7
David Blair	Discus throw F64	53.18	4
Jeremy Campbell	Discus throw F64	60.22	1st place, gold medalist(s)
Justin Phongsavanh	Javelin throw F54	31.09	3rd place, bronze medalist(s)
Mike Gallardo	Javelin throw F64	54.72	7

Women's field

Athlete	Event	Result	Rank
Jaleen Roberts	Long jump T37	4.65	2nd place, silver medalist(s)
Taleah Williams	Long jump T47	5.39	4
Beatriz Hatz	Long jump T64	5.43	5
Jessica Heims	Discus throw F64	34.89 AR	5
Cassie Mitchell	Discus throw F51	14.16	4
Cassie Mitchell	Club throw F51	24.18 AR	2nd place, silver medalist(s)

== Cycling ==
Joseph Berenyi, Clara Brown, Alicia Dana, Thomas Davis, Alfredo de los Santos, Will Groulx, Cody Jung, Oksana Masters, Shawn Morelli, Christopher Murphy, Eric Pinney, Matthew Rodriguez, Monica Sereda, Jill Walsh and Jamie Whitmore have all qualified to compete.

== Equestrian ==
Rebecca Hart, Beatrice Lasnier De Lavalette, Kate Shoemaker and Roxanne Trunnell have all qualified to compete.

== Goalball ==
=== Men ===
The following is the United States roster in the men's goalball tournament of the 2020 Summer Paralympics.

No.	Player	Class	Date of birth (age)
1	Daryl Walker	B2	December 29, 1981 (aged 39)
2	Tyler Merren	B2	May 29, 1984 (aged 37)
4	John Kusku	B2	August 6, 1984 (aged 37)
7	Matt Simpson	B1	March 30, 1990 (aged 31)
5	Zachary Buhler	B2	January 5, 1997 (aged 24)
6	Calahan Young	B2	February 23, 1995 (aged 26)

Group stage

Pos	Team	Pld	W	D	L	GF	GA	GD	Pts	Qualification
1	Japan (H)	4	3	0	1	37	15	+22	9	Quarter-finals
2	Brazil	4	3	0	1	35	17	+18	9	Quarter-finals
3	United States	4	2	0	2	25	35	−10	6	Quarter-finals
4	Lithuania	4	1	1	2	24	31	−7	4	Quarter-finals
5	Algeria	4	0	1	3	20	43	−23	1	

Source: TOCOG
(H) Hosts

26 August 2021; 13:15	United States	8–6	Brazil	Makuhari Messe, Tokyo; Referees: Reza Dehghan (Iran), Robert Avery (Great Britain)
26 August 2021; 13:15	Young 4 Merren 1 Simpson 1 Walker 1 Sousa 1 (o.g.)	Report	Moreno 3 Sousa 2 Marques 1	Makuhari Messe, Tokyo; Referees: Reza Dehghan (Iran), Robert Avery (Great Britain)

27 August 2021; 13:15	Japan	11–1	United States	Makuhari Messe, Tokyo; Referees: Reza Dehghan (Iran), Woradet Kultawongwattana (Thailand)
27 August 2021; 13:15	Sano 6 Miyajiki 3 Kaneko 2	Report	Walker 1	Makuhari Messe, Tokyo; Referees: Reza Dehghan (Iran), Woradet Kultawongwattana (Thailand)

29 August 2021; 17:30	Algeria	5–13	United States	Makuhari Messe, Tokyo; Referees: Romualdas Vaitiekus (Lithuania), Warrick Jackes (Australia)
29 August 2021; 17:30	Belhouchat 4 Larbi 1	Report	Young 8 Simpson 3 Walker 2	Makuhari Messe, Tokyo; Referees: Romualdas Vaitiekus (Lithuania), Warrick Jackes (Australia)

30 August 2021; 13:15	United States	3–13	Lithuania	Makuhari Messe, Tokyo; Referees: Robert Avery (Great Britain), Bas Spaans (Netherlands)
30 August 2021; 13:15	Simpson 2 Young 1	Report	Montvydas 5 Zibolis 4 Pavliukianec 2 Pazarauskas 2	Makuhari Messe, Tokyo; Referees: Robert Avery (Great Britain), Bas Spaans (Netherlands)

Quarter-final

31 August 2021; 15:00	Ukraine	4–5	United States	Makuhari Messe, Tokyo; Referees: Warrick Jackes (Australia), Vaida Pokvytytė (LTU)
31 August 2021; 15:00	Oliinyk 3 Zhyhalin 1	Report	Young 4 Simpson 1	Makuhari Messe, Tokyo; Referees: Warrick Jackes (Australia), Vaida Pokvytytė (LTU)

Semi-finals

2 September 2021; 13:15	China	8–1	United States	Makuhari Messe, Tokyo; Referees: Bas Spaans (Netherlands), Raquel Gomez Aguado (Spain)
2 September 2021; 13:15	Yang Mingyuan 6 Hu Mingyao 2	Report	Young 1	Makuhari Messe, Tokyo; Referees: Bas Spaans (Netherlands), Raquel Gomez Aguado (Spain)

Bronze medal match

3 September 2021; 15:00	United States	7–10	Lithuania	Makuhari Messe, Tokyo; Referees: Robert Avery (Great Britain), Warrick Jackes (Australia)
3 September 2021; 15:00	Simpson 2 Walker 2 Young 2 Kusku 1	Report	Zibolis 4 Pavliukianec 3 Montvydas 2 Pažarauskas 1	Makuhari Messe, Tokyo; Referees: Robert Avery (Great Britain), Warrick Jackes (Australia)

=== Women ===
The following is the United States roster in the women's goalball tournament of the 2020 Summer Paralympics.

No.	Player	Class	Date of birth (age)
3	Lisa Czechowski	B2	May 29, 1979 (aged 42)
4	Asya Miller	B3	October 16, 1979 (aged 41)
5	Amanda Dennis	B2	February 5, 1994 (aged 27)
6	Mindy Cook	B3	September 23, 1988 (aged 32)
7	Eliana Mason	B2	September 1, 1995 (aged 25)
9	Marybai Huking	B2	November 11, 1996 (aged 24)

Group stage

Pos	Team	Pld	W	D	L	GF	GA	GD	Pts	Qualification
1	Turkey	4	3	0	1	30	11	+19	9	Quarterfinals
2	United States	4	3	0	1	22	10	+12	9	Quarterfinals
3	Japan (H)	4	2	1	1	18	13	+5	7	Quarterfinals
4	Brazil	4	1	1	2	23	19	+4	4	Quarterfinals
5	Egypt	4	0	0	4	3	43	−40	0	

Source: TOCOG
Rules for classification: 1) points; 2) goal difference; 3) number of wins; 4) goals against; 5) head-to-head goal difference.
(H) Hosts
25 August 2021
20:30

Brazil	4–6	United States
Custodio 1'; Amorim 9'; Gomes 16', 19'	Report	Czechowski 2'; Dennis 2', 14', 21'; Mason 5', 8'

Makuhari Messe, Tokyo
Referee: Warrick Jackes (Australia), Vaida Pokvytytė (Lithuania)

27 August 2021
19:00

United States	10–0	Egypt
Dennis 1', 4', 5', 6'; Czechowski 5', 12'; Mason 7', 8'; Miller 11', 15'	Report

Makuhari Messe, Tokyo
Referee: Vaida Pokvytytė (Lithuania), Bas Spaans (Netherlands)

28 August 2021
13:15

Japan	3–2	United States
Hagiwara 8', 11'; Wakasugi 17'	Report	Dennis 8', 19'

Makuhari Messe, Tokyo
Referee: Launel Scott (Canada), Woradet Kultawongwattana (Thailand)

30 August 2021
19:00

United States	4–3	Turkey
Mason 8'; Miller 11'; Dennis 13', 22'	Report	Sevd. Altunoluk 1', 4', 9'

Makuhari Messe, Tokyo
Referee: Raquel Aguado Gómez (Spain), Svitlana Moroz (Ukraine)

Quarter-final

1 September 2021
19:30

United States	5–3	RPC
Mason 4', 8', 19'; Dennis 14', 19'	Report	Arestova 2', 7', 9'

Makuhari Messe, Tokyo
Referee: Romualdas Vaitiekus (Lithuania), Robert Avery (Great Britain)

Semi-finals

2 September 2021
19:30

Brazil	4–5 (ET)	United States
Gomes 7', 9'; Custodio 1 ET; Aparecida de Lima 1 ET	Report	Dennis 22', 24', 1 ET; Czechowski 1 ET; Mason 1 ET

Makuhari Messe, Tokyo
Referee: Vaida Pokvytytė (Lithuania), Robert Avery (Great Britain)

Gold medal match

3 September 2021
17:45

United States	2–9	Turkey
Mason 9'; Miller 22'	Report	Sevd. Altunoluk 1', 1', 5', 6', 6', 8', 18', 18', 20'

Makuhari Messe, Tokyo
Referee: Raquel Aguado Gómez (Spain), Svitlana Moroz (Ukraine)

== Judo ==
Katie Davis, Ben Goodrich, Maria Liana Mutia and Robert Tanaka have all qualified to compete.

== Paracanoeing ==
Kaitlyn Verfuerth and Blake Haxton have both qualified to compete. Haxton is also going to compete in rowing.

== Paratriathlon ==
Seven paratriathletes have qualified to compete.

== Powerlifting ==
Jacob Schrom has qualified to compete.

== Rowing ==
U.S. qualified four boats for all of the rowing classes into the Paralympic regatta. All of them qualified after successfully entering the top seven for single sculls events and top eight for mixed events at the 2019 World Rowing Championships in Ottensheim, Austria.

Athlete	Event	Heats		Repechage		Final	
Athlete	Event	Time	Rank	Time	Rank	Time	Rank
Blake Haxton	Men's single sculls	12:03.03	5 R	10:28.82	4 FB	11:40.29	10
Hallie Smith	Women's single sculls	13:42.87	6 R	12:13.12	4 FB	13:55.87	10
Laura Goodkind; Russell Gernaat	Mixed double sculls	9:27.00	5 R	8:26.17	4 FB	9:11.63	10
Allie Reilly; Danielle Hansen; Charley Nordin; John Tanguay; Karen Petrik	Mixed coxed four	7:19.97	1 FA	Bye		7:20.13	2nd place, silver medalist(s)

Qualification Legend: FA=Final A (medal); FB=Final B (non-medal); R=Repechage

== Shooting ==
Jazmin-Almlie-Ryan, Stetson Bardfield, Taylor Farmer, McKenna Geer, Yan Xiao Gong, John Joss and Kevin Nguyen have all qualified to compete.

== Sitting volleyball ==
The women's sitting volleyball team qualified for the 2020 Summer Paralympics after their results at the 2018 World ParaVolley Championships.

Summary

Team	Event	Group stage				Semifinal	Final / BM / Cl.	
Team	Event	Opposition Score	Opposition Score	Opposition Score	Rank	Opposition Score	Opposition Score	Rank
United States women's	Women's tournament	Rwanda; W 3–0	China; L 0–3	RPC; W 3–0	2 Q	Brazil; W 3–0	China; W 3–1	1st place, gold medalist(s)

=== Women's tournament ===
Group play

Pos	Team	Pld	W	L	Pts	SW	SL	SR	SPW	SPL	SPR	Qualification
1	China	3	3	0	3	9	0	MAX	226	137	1.650	Semifinals
2	United States	3	2	1	2	6	3	2.000	213	163	1.307	Semifinals
3	RPC	3	1	2	1	3	6	0.500	181	180	1.006	Fifth place match
4	Rwanda	3	0	3	0	0	9	0.000	85	225	0.378	Seventh place match

Source: TOCOG

28 August 2021; 14:00 v	United States	3–0	Rwanda	Makuhari Messe, Tokyo; Referees: Barbara Pakuła (POL), Dominik Raca (CRO)
28 August 2021; 14:00 v	(25–11, 25–9, 25–11); Results Statistics			Makuhari Messe, Tokyo; Referees: Barbara Pakuła (POL), Dominik Raca (CRO)

30 August 2021; 18:30 v	United States	0–3	China	Makuhari Messe, Tokyo; Referees: Benno Meijer (NED), Haris Helac (BIH)
30 August 2021; 18:30 v	(17–25, 22–25, 24–26); Results Statistics			Makuhari Messe, Tokyo; Referees: Benno Meijer (NED), Haris Helac (BIH)

1 September 2021; 18:30 v	RPC	0–3	United States	Makuhari Messe, Tokyo; Referees: Neal Konowalyk (CAN), Vanessa Redes (BRA)
1 September 2021; 18:30 v	(19–25, 15–25, 22–25); Results Statistics			Makuhari Messe, Tokyo; Referees: Neal Konowalyk (CAN), Vanessa Redes (BRA)

Semifinal

3 September 2021; 18:30 v	Brazil	0–3	United States	Makuhari Messe, Tokyo; Referees: Krisztina Árpás (HUN), Huang Xiao (CHN)
3 September 2021; 18:30 v	(19–25, 11–25, 23–25); Results Statistics			Makuhari Messe, Tokyo; Referees: Krisztina Árpás (HUN), Huang Xiao (CHN)

Gold medal game

5 September 2021; 10:00 v	(gold) United States	3–1	China (silver)	Makuhari Messe, Tokyo; Referees: Ebrahim Firouzi (IRI), Marie-Claude Richer (CAN)
5 September 2021; 10:00 v	(25–12, 25–20, 22–25, 25–19); Results Statistics			Makuhari Messe, Tokyo; Referees: Ebrahim Firouzi (IRI), Marie-Claude Richer (CAN)

== Swimming ==
34 American swimmers are qualified to compete in the Paralympics.

Men

Athlete	Event	Heats		Final	
Athlete	Event	Result	Rank	Result	Rank
David Abrahams	100m butterfly SB13	1:00.69	9	Did not advance	
David Abrahams	200m individual medley SM13	2:14.23 AM	5 Q	2:12.67 AM	4
David Abrahams	100m breaststroke SB13	1:04.04 AM	2 Q	1:04.38	2nd place, silver medalist(s)
Evan Austin	400m freestyle S7	4:57.35	5 Q	4:38.95 AM	3rd place, bronze medalist(s)
Evan Austin	200m individual medley SM7	2:35.40	4	2:32.53	5
Evan Austin	4 × 100 m freestyle relay – 34 points	—N/a		4:13.94	8
Evan Austin	50m butterfly S7	29.71	1 Q	28.98 AM	1st place, gold medalist(s)
Parker Egbert	200m individual medley SM14	2:22.58	17	Did not advance	
Parker Egbert	100m backstroke S14	1:03.12	12	Did not advance	
Rudy Garcia-Tolson	200m individual medley SM7	2:39.78	7 Q	2:39.52	7
Rudy Garcia-Tolson	100m breaststroke SB6	1:25.41	6 Q	1:24.64	6
Rudy Garcia-Tolson	4 × 100 m freestyle relay – 34 points	—N/a		4:13.94	8
Rudy Garcia-Tolson	50m butterfly S7	32.34	9	Did not advance	
Robert Griswold	100m backstroke S8	1:05.49	1 Q	1:02.55 WR	1st place, gold medalist(s)
Robert Griswold	200m individual medley SM8	2:26.48	2 Q	2:24.97	4
Robert Griswold	400m freestyle S8	4:34.35	3 Q	4:31.96	5
Robert Griswold	100m butterfly S8	1:02.52 AM	1 Q	1:02.03 AM	1st place, gold medalist(s)
Jamal Hill	100m freestyle S10	57.70	16	Did not advance	
Jamal Hill	50m freestyle S9	25.56	4 Q	25.19 AM	3rd place, bronze medalist(s)
Jamal Hill	4 × 100 m freestyle relay – 34 points	—N/a		4:13.94	8
Jamal Hill	4 × 100 m medley relay – 34 points	4:50.05	9	Did not advance	
Joey Peppersack	100m backstroke S8	1:09.30	5 Q	1:09.45	7
Joey Peppersack	4 × 100 m freestyle relay – 34 points	—N/a		4:13.94	8
Joey Peppersack	4 × 100 m medley relay – 34 points	4:50.05	9	Did not advance	
Lawrence Sapp	100m butterfly S14	56.97	3 Q	57.36	5
Lawrence Sapp	200m individual medley SM14	2:17.89	12	Did not advance	
Lawrence Sapp	100m backstroke S14	1:04.53	14	Did not advance	
Zach Shattuck	200m individual medley SM6	2:49.50	7 Q	2:52.52	8
Zach Shattuck	100m breaststroke SB6	1:26.01	9	Did not advance	
Zach Shattuck	50m butterfly S6	34.43	10	Did not advance	
Zach Shattuck	400m freestyle S6	5:29.95	9	Did not advance	
Zach Shattuck	4 × 100 m medley relay – 34 points	4:50.05	9	Did not advance	
Matthew Torres	100m freestyle S8	1:01.35	10	Did not advance	
Matthew Torres	100m backstroke S8	1:14.03	10	Did not advance	
Matthew Torres	400m freestyle S8	4:31.77	1 Q	4:28.47 AM	3rd place, bronze medalist(s)
Matthew Torres	4 × 100 m medley relay – 34 points	4:50.05	9	Did not advance	

Women

Athlete	Event	Heats		Final	
Athlete	Event	Result	Rank	Result	Rank
Hannah Aspden	100m breaststroke SB8	1:32.40	10	Did not advance	
Hannah Aspden	4 × 100 m freestyle relay – 34 points	—N/a		N/A	DSQ
Hannah Aspden	100m backstroke S9	1:09.83	1 Q	1:09.22 AM	1st place, gold medalist(s)
Hannah Aspden	100m freestyle S9	1:05.35	11	Did not advance	
Hannah Aspden	200m individual medley SM9	2:48.46	11	Did not advance	
Hannah Aspden	4 × 100 m medley relay – 34 points	—N/a		4:52.40	1st place, gold medalist(s)
McKenzie Coan	400m freestyle S7	—N/a		5:05.84	1st place, gold medalist(s)
McKenzie Coan	100m backstroke S7	—N/a		1:23.10	4
McKenzie Coan	100m freestyle S7	1:10.68	1 Q	1:10.22	2nd place, silver medalist(s)
McKenzie Coan	50m freestyle S8	33.12	7 Q	33.18	8
McKenzie Coan	50m butterfly S7	38.08	6 Q	37.47	7
Cailin Currie	400m freestyle S13	4:50.11	9	Did not advance	
Julia Gaffney	200m individual medley SM7	N/A	DSQ	Did not advance	
Julia Gaffney	400m freestyle S7	—N/a		5:11.89	3rd place, bronze medalist(s)
Julia Gaffney	100m backstroke S7	—N/a		1:22.02	3rd place, bronze medalist(s)
Julia Gaffney	100m freestyle S7	1:14.65	7 Q	1:15.70	8
Julia Gaffney	50m butterfly S7	36.14	5 Q	35.74	5
McClain Hermes	400m freestyle S11	5:38.56	7 Q	5:29.34	6
McClain Hermes	100m backstroke S11	1:29.11	11	Did not advance	
McClain Hermes	200m individual medley S11	3:26.81	13	Did not advance	
McClain Hermes	100m breaststroke SB11	1:48.39	10	Did not advance	
Sophia Herzog	200m individual medley SM6	3:09.48	8 Q	3:07.98	7
Sophia Herzog	100m breaststroke SB6	1:35.50 AM	3 Q	1:36.06	3rd place, bronze medalist(s)
Sophia Herzog	50m butterfly S6	42.64	15	Did not advance	
Mikaela Jenkins	100m breaststroke SB9	1:24.89	8 Q	1:23.89	8
Mikaela Jenkins	100m butterfly S10	—N/a		1:07.52	1st place, gold medalist(s)
Mikaela Jenkins	100m backstroke S10	1:14.00	9	Did not advance	
Mikaela Jenkins	4 × 100 m medley relay – 34 points	—N/a		4:52.40	1st place, gold medalist(s)
Mikaela Jenkins	200m individual medley SM10	2:35.81	6 Q	2:36.34	7
Keegan Knott	400m freestyle S9	5:00.92	12	Did not advance	
Ahalya Lettenberger	200m individual medley SM7	3:05.06	2 Q	3:02.82	2nd place, silver medalist(s)
Ahalya Lettenberger	400m freestyle S7	—N/a		5:13.55	4
Jessica Long	100m backstroke S8	—N/a		1:18.55	3rd place, bronze medalist(s)
Jessica Long	200m individual medley SM8	2:41.83	1 Q	2:41.49	1st place, gold medalist(s)
Jessica Long	4 × 100 m freestyle relay – 34 points	—N/a		N/A	DSQ
Jessica Long	400m freestyle S8	—N/a		4:43.41	2nd place, silver medalist(s)
Jessica Long	100m breaststroke SB7	1:37.39	4 Q	1:34.82	2nd place, silver medalist(s)
Jessica Long	4 × 100 m medley relay – 34 points	—N/a		4:52.40	1st place, gold medalist(s)
Jessica Long	100m butterfly S8	—N/a		1:09.87	1st place, gold medalist(s)
Elizabeth Marks	50m freestyle S6	33.16 PR	1 Q	33.15	2nd place, silver medalist(s)
Elizabeth Marks	200m individual medley SM6	2:57.42	2 Q	3:02.43	4
Elizabeth Marks	50m butterfly S6	36.84 AM	3 Q	36.83 AM	3rd place, bronze medalist(s)
Elizabeth Marks	100m backstroke S6	1:21.76	1 Q	1:19.57 WR	1st place, gold medalist(s)
Makayla Nietzel	100m butterfly S13	1:07.21	4 Q	1:08.00	7
Makayla Nietzel	400m freestyle S13	4:48.15	7 Q	4:47.45	7
Anastasia Pagonis	400m freestyle S11	4:58.40 WR	1 Q	4:54.49 WR	1st place, gold medalist(s)
Anastasia Pagonis	50m freestyle S11	31.19	8 Q	30.91 AM	8
Anastasia Pagonis	200m individual medley SM11	2:48.45	2 Q	2:45.61 AM	3rd place, bronze medalist(s)
Anastasia Pagonis	100m freestyle S11	1:08.92	3 Q	1:06.65	4
Gia Pergolini	100m butterfly S13	1:07.79	7 Q	1:06.46	5
Gia Pergolini	100m backstroke S13	1:05.05 WR	1 Q	1:04.64 WR	1st place, gold medalist(s)
Gia Pergolini	50m freestyle S13	28.18	9	Did not advance	
Martha Ruether	100m butterfly S13	1:13.08	13	Did not advance	
Martha Ruether	50m freestyle S13	28.88	15	Did not advance	
Martha Ruether	100m breaststroke SB13	1:28.89	15	Did not advance	
Summer Schmit	400m freestyle S9	4:57.11	8 Q	4:56.92	7
Summer Schmit	100m breaststroke SB9	1:25.91	10	Did not advance	
Summer Schmit	100m freestyle S9	1:07.71	15	Did not advance	
Summer Schmit	200m individual medley SM9	2:40.27	5 Q	2:38.64	5
Summer Schmit	100m butterfly S9	1:13.46	7 Q	1:12.95	6
Haven Shepherd	200m individual medley SM8	3:08.04	7 Q	3:03.59	5
Haven Shepherd	100m breaststroke SB7	1:56.26	9	Did not advance	
Natalie Sims	400m freestyle S9	4:56.51	7 Q	4:58.55	8
Natalie Sims	4 × 100 m freestyle relay – 34 points	—N/a		N/A	DSQ
Natalie Sims	100m freestyle S9	1:04.51	8 Q	1:03.85	7
Natalie Sims	200m individual medley SM9	2:43.95	9	Did not advance	
Elizabeth Smith	100m backstroke S9	1:14.79	6 Q	1:14.24	5
Elizabeth Smith	100m butterfly S9	1:08.03 AM	2 Q	1:08.22	2nd place, silver medalist(s)
Leanne Smith	150m individual medley SM4	3:08.12	6 Q	3:07.07	5
Leanne Smith	50m backstroke S3	1:01.11	6 Q	1:02.93	6
Leanne Smith	100m freestyle S3	1:42.01	1 Q	1:37.68	2nd place, silver medalist(s)
Leanne Smith	50m breaststroke SB3	1:03.49	4 Q	1:02.95	5
Morgan Stickney	4 × 100 m freestyle relay – 34 points	—N/a		N/A	DSQ
Morgan Stickney	400m freestyle S8	—N/a		4:42.39	1st place, gold medalist(s)
Morgan Stickney	50m freestyle S8	33.50	9	Did not advance	
Morgan Stickney	4 × 100 m medley relay – 34 points	—N/a		4:52.40	1st place, gold medalist(s)
Mallory Weggemann	200m individual medley SM7	2:54.25 PR	1 Q	2:55.48	1st place, gold medalist(s)
Mallory Weggemann	100m breaststroke SB6	1:43.29	9	Did not advance	
Mallory Weggemann	100m backstroke S7	—N/a		1:21.27 PR	1st place, gold medalist(s)
Mallory Weggemann	100m freestyle S7	1:12.54	5 Q	1:11.98	5
Mallory Weggemann	50m freestyle S8	32.63	5 Q	32.66	7
Mallory Weggemann	50m butterfly S7	34.92	2 Q	34.30	2nd place, silver medalist(s)
Meimei White	100m breaststroke SB8	1:32.84	11	Did not advance	
Colleen Young	100m breaststroke SB13	1:09.39	7 Q	1:09.89	8
Colleen Young	50m freestyle S13	29.21	20	Did not advance	
Colleen Young	200m individual medley SM13	2:29.61	2 Q	2:26.80	2nd place, silver medalist(s)
Colleen Young	100m breaststroke SB13	1:16.40	3	1:15.69 AM	3rd place, bronze medalist(s)

== Table tennis ==
United States entered three athletes into the table tennis competition at the games. Ian Seidenfeld & Tahl Leibovitz qualified from 2019 Parapan American Games which was held in Lima, Peru and Jenson Van Emburgh via World Ranking allocation.

Men

Athlete	Event	Group Stage			Round 1	Quarterfinals	Semifinals	Final	
Athlete	Event	Opposition Result	Opposition Result	Rank	Opposition Result	Opposition Result	Opposition Result	Opposition Result	Rank
Michael Godfrey	Individual C1	Borgato (ITA); L 1-3	Major (HUN); L 0-3	3	Did not advance				
Jenson Van Emburgh	Individual C3	Zhai X (CHN); L 0-3	Svatoš (CZE); W 3-2	2 Q	Brüchle (GER); W 3-2	Toporkov (RPC); W 3-0	Feng (CHN); L 0-3	Did not advance	3rd place, bronze medalist(s)
Ian Seidenfeld	Individual C6	Rosenmeier (DEN); L 2-3	Parenzan (ITA); W 3-0	2 Q	Rau (GER); W 3-1	Dettoni (CHI); W 3-2	Karabardak (GBR); W 3-0	Rosenmeier (DEN); W 3-0	1st place, gold medalist(s)
Tahl Leibovitz	Individual C9	Devos (BEL); L 0-3	Perez Gonzalez (ESP); W 3-0	2 Q	—N/a	Mai (UKR); L 2-3	Did not advance		

== Taekwondo ==
Para taekwondo makes its debut appearance in the Paralympic programme, Evan Medell & Brianna Salinaro, qualified to the 2020 Summer Paralympics via World Ranking.

Athlete	Event	First round	Quarterfinals	Repechage 1	Repechage 2	Semifinals	Final	
Athlete	Event	Opposition Result	Opposition Result	Opposition Result	Opposition Result	Opposition Result	Opposition Result	Rank
Evan Medell	Men's +75 kg	Bye	Abidar (LBA); W 22-19	—N/a		Mikulić (CRO); L 9-28	Molina (CRC); W 13-11	3rd place, bronze medalist(s)
Brianna Salinaro	Women's –58 kg	Bye	Fernandes (BRA); L 2-15	Goverdhan (NEP); L 0-18	Did not advance			

== Wheelchair basketball ==
=== Men's tournament ===
Roster

The following is the United States roster in the men's wheelchair basketball tournament of the 2020 Summer Paralympics.

United States men's national wheelchair basketball team - 2020 Summer Paralympics roster
Players
Coaches

No.	Name	Age – Date of birth	Pts.
1	Jorge Sanchez	29 – 3 October 1991	4.0
2	Jacob Williams	30 – 2 August 1991	2.5
4	Joshua Turek	42 – 12 April 1979	3.5
5	Michael Paye	38 – 24 March 1983	3.0
6	Matt Lesperance	34 – 23 May 1987	1.0
7	Ryan Neiswender	27 – 11 May 1994	2.0
8	Brian Bell	32 – 24 February 1989	4.5
9	Matt Scott	36 – 27 March 1985	3.5
11	Steve Serio	33 – 8 September 1987	3.5
15	Nate Hinze	33 – 12 June 1988	4.5
16	Trevon Jenifer	32 – 7 September 1988	2.5
33	John Boie	30 – 11 February 1991	1.0

Head coach

Ron Lykins

Assistant coach(es)

Robert Taylor, Christina Schwab

Legend

- Age - describes age on 24 August 2021

Groupstage

Pos	Team	Pld	W	L	PF	PA	PD	Pts	Qualification
1	Great Britain	5	4	1	332	303	+29	9	Quarter-finals
2	United States	5	4	1	338	223	+115	9	Quarter-finals
3	Australia	5	3	2	335	265	+70	8	Quarter-finals
4	Germany	5	3	2	306	284	+22	8	Quarter-finals
5	Iran	5	1	4	271	318	−47	6	9th/10th place playoff
6	Algeria	5	0	5	202	391	−189	5	11th/12th place playoff

Source: TOCOG
Rules for classification: 1) Points; 2) Head-to-head results; 3) Points difference; 4) Points scored.

26 August 2021
9:00

Report

United States	58–55	Germany
Scoring by quarter: 10–16, 12–12, 18–14, 18–13
Pts: Bell 20; Rebs: Bell 8 Asts: Scott 10		Pts: Böhme 19; Rebs: Böhme 9 Asts: Böhme 7

Ariake Arena
Referees: Linas Radykas

27 August 2021
17:00

Report

Iran	41–65	United States
Scoring by quarter: 9–22, 9–17, 11–14, 12–12
Pts: Sayari 17; Rebs: Sayari 14; Asts: Saadatpoormoghadam 6		Pts: Serio 12; Rebs: Serio 8 Asts: Serio 10

Ariake Arena
Referees: Hector Carmona

28 August 2021
17:00

Report

Great Britain	64–63	United States
Scoring by quarter: 20–15, 15–14, 16–15, 13–19
Pts: Choudhry, Manning 12; Rebs: Manning 14; Asts: Choudhry 10		Pts: Williams 19; Rebs: Serio 7 Asts: Serio 8

Musashino Forest Sport Plaza
Attendance: 1,032
Referees: Yekta Şansal Koç

29 August 2021
14:45

Report

United States	66–38	Australia
Scoring by quarter: 17–15, 21–11, 16–4, 12–8
Pts: Williams 24; Rebs: Serio 9 Asts: Williams 7		Pts: Latham 13; Rebs: Latham 9 Asts: O'Neill-Thorne 7

Musashino Forest Sport Plaza
Attendance: 810
Referees: Linas Radykas

Quarter-final

1 September 2021
12:30

Report

United States	52–45	Turkey
Scoring by quarter: 11–18, 14–8, 10–6, 17–13
Pts: Bell 18; Rebs: Serio 9 Asts: Serio 10		Pts: Gürbulak 21; Rebs: Gürbulak 12; Asts: Toprak 7

Ariake Arena
Referees: Gustavo Mathias

Semi-finals

3 September 2021
18:15

Report

Spain	52–66	United States
Scoring by quarter: 14–15, 8–24, 11–18, 19–9
Pts: Zarzuela 17; Rebs: García 12; Asts: García 15		Pts: Bell 20; Rebs: Bell 11; Asts: Serio 8

Ariake Arena
Attendance: 347
Referees: Alexandre Lapointe

=== Women's tournament ===
Roster

The following is the United States roster in the women's wheelchair basketball tournament of the 2020 Summer Paralympics.

United States women's national wheelchair basketball team - 2020 Summer Paralympics roster
Players
Coaches

No.	Name	Age – Date of birth	Pts.
1	Alejandra Ibanez	21 – 26 January 2000	2.5
3	Abigail Bauleke	20 – 31 July 2001	1.5
4	Zoe Voris	22 – 4 December 1998	3.5
5	Darlene Hunter	39 – 16 April 1982	1.0
7	Josie Aslakson	25 – 14 September 1995	1.0
8	Natalie Schneider	38 – 11 February 1983	4.5
15	Rose Hollermann	25 – 25 December 1995	3.5
21	Kaitlyn Eaton	27 – 17 August 1994	1.5
24	Lindsey Zurbrugg	22 – 22 September 1998	2.5
43	Bailey Moody	19 – 16 November 2001	4.0
54	Ixhelt Gonzalez	17 – 1 June 2004	4.5
55	Amy Spangler	30 – 21 September 1990	2.0

Head coach

Lawrence Johnson

Assistant coach(es)

Amy Spangler, Adam Kramer

Legend

- Age - describes age on 24 August 2021

Groupstage

Pos	Team	Pld	W	L	PF	PA	PD	Pts	Qualification
1	China	4	4	0	207	133	+74	8	Quarter-finals
2	Netherlands	4	3	1	278	145	+133	7	Quarter-finals
3	United States	4	2	2	229	165	+64	6	Quarter-finals
4	Spain	4	1	3	167	185	−18	5	Quarter-finals
5	Algeria	4	0	4	72	325	−253	4	9th/10th place playoff

Source: TOCOG
Rules for classification: 1) Points; 2) Head-to-head results; 3) Points difference; 4) Points scored.

25 August 2021
11:15

Report

Netherlands	68–58	United States
Scoring by quarter: 14–16, 20–20, 16–16, 18–6
Pts: Beijer 28; Rebs: Beijer 12; Asts: Visser 12		Pts: Zurbrugg 20; Rebs: Hollermann, Schneider 9 Asts: Ryan 12

Musashino Forest Sport Plaza
Referees: Juan Urunuela

26 August 2021
17:00

Report

United States	68–34	Spain
Scoring by quarter: 18–11, 14–9, 21–11, 15–3
Pts: Hollermann 20; Rebs: Hollermann 11; Asts: Hollermann 8		Pts: Lopez 11; Rebs: Lopez 8 Asts: Lopez 3

Ariake Arena
Referees: Maurizio Zamponi

28 August 2021
9:00

Report

United States	41–42	China
Scoring by quarter: 12–2, 9–5, 6–14, 14–21
Pts: Zurbrugg 15; Rebs: Ryan 9 Asts: Hollermann 7		Pts: Zhang X. 15; Rebs: Dai 10; Asts: Lin 7

Musashino Forest Sport Plaza
Attendance: 830
Referees: Hsieh Shu-fei

29 August 2021
17:00

Report

Algeria	21–62	United States
Scoring by quarter: 0–18, 5–14, 9–18, 7–12
Pts: Boublal 10; Rebs: Abdelali 7 Asts: Khemgani 4		Pts: Gonzalez 14; Rebs: Gonzalez 7 Asts: Ryan 7

Musashino Forest Sport Plaza
Attendance: 810
Referees: Geghard Tahmasian

Quarterfinal

31 August 2021
12:30

Report

Canada	48–63	United States
Scoring by quarter: 10–12, 13–21, 9–12, 16–18
Pts: Young 11; Rebs: Dandeneau 13; Asts: Dandeneau, Young 6		Pts: Hollermann 19; Rebs: Hollermann, Schneider 9 Asts: Ryan 13

Ariake Arena
Referees: Maurizio Zamponi

Semifinal

2 September 2021
20:45

Report

United States	36–41	China
Scoring by quarter: 9–6, 6–14, 8–7, 13–14
Pts: Hollermann 13; Rebs: Schneider 10; Asts: Hollermann, Ryan 5		Pts: Zhang T. 13; Rebs: Lin, Lyu 8 Asts: Lin 5

Ariake Arena
Attendance: 279
Referees: Tomas Pajer

Bronze medal match

4 September 2021
17:45

Report

Germany	51–64	United States (bronze)
Scoring by quarter: 13–20, 12–11, 14–13, 12–20
Pts: Miller 26; Rebs: Lang 11; Asts: Miller 8		Pts: Zurbrugg 22; Rebs: Hollermann 12; Asts: Hollermann 10

Ariake Arena
Attendance: 30
Referees: Shunsuke Nikaido

== Wheelchair fencing ==
Ellen Geddes, Terry Hayes and Shelby Jensen have all qualified to compete.

== Wheelchair rugby ==
United States national wheelchair rugby team qualified for the Games for the games by winning the gold medal at the 2019 Parapan American Games in Lima, Peru.

Team roster

- Team event – 1 team of 12 players

Squad	Group stage				Semifinal	Final	Rank
Squad	Opposition Result	Opposition Result	Opposition Result	Rank	Opposition Result	Opposition Result	Rank
United States national team	New Zealand; W 63-35	Canada; W 58-54	Great Britain; W 50-48	1	Australia; W 49-42	Great Britain; L 49-54	2nd place, silver medalist(s)

Group stage

Pos	Team	Pld	W	D	L	GF	GA	GD	Pts	Qualification
1	United States	3	3	0	0	171	137	+34	6	Semi-finals
2	Great Britain	3	2	0	1	158	134	+24	4	Semi-finals
3	Canada	3	1	0	2	152	144	+8	2	Fifth place Match
4	New Zealand	3	0	0	3	108	174	−66	0	Seventh place Match

Source: Tokyo2020
25 August 2021
12:45

United States	63–35	New Zealand

Yoyogi National Stadium, Tokyo

26 August 2021
12:45

United States	58–54	Canada

Yoyogi National Stadium, Tokyo

27 August 2021
12:45

United States	50–48	Great Britain

Yoyogi National Stadium, Tokyo

Semifinal

28 August 2021
20:00

United States	49–42	Australia

Yoyogi National Stadium, Tokyo

Gold medal match

29 August 2021
20:00

United States	49–54	Great Britain

Yoyogi National Stadium, Tokyo

== Wheelchair tennis ==
U.S. qualified seven players entries for wheelchair tennis. Five of them qualified by world ranking, while the other qualified by received the bipartite commission invitation allocation quotas.

Athlete	Event	Round of 64	Round of 32	Round of 16	Quarterfinals	Semifinals	Final / BM	
Athlete	Event	Opposition Result	Opposition Result	Opposition Result	Opposition Result	Opposition Result	Opposition Result	Rank
Casey Ratzlaff	Men's singles	F Cattaneo (FRA); W 6–2, 5-7	J Gérard (BEL)'; L 1–6, 1-6	Did not advance				
Conner Stroud	Men's singles	M Scheffers (NED); L 4–6, 3-6	Did not advance					
Shelby Baron	Women's singles	—N/a	M Duval (BRA)	Did not advance				
Emmy Kaiser	Women's singles	—N/a	Huang J (CHN); L 1–6, 1-6	Did not advance				
Dana Mathewson	Women's singles	—N/a	C Fairbank (FRA); W 6–0, 6-3	S Khanthasit (THA); W 6–2, 6-4	J Whiley (GBR); L 3–6, 6–3, 5-7	Did not advance		
Bryan Barten	Quad singles	—N/a			Kim K-s (KOR); W 6–4, 6-1	D Alcott (AUS); L 0–6, 1-6	Did not advance	
David Wagner	Quad singles	—N/a			Y Silva (BRA); W 3–6, 6–2, 6-2	K Sugeno (JPN); L 4–6, 3-6	Did not advance	
Bryan Barten; David Wagner	Quad doubles	—N/a			(Netherlands) S Schroder / N Vink (NED); L 2–6, 1-6	Did not advance		

== See also ==
- United States at the Paralympics
- United States at the 2020 Summer Olympics
