= 2022 World Para Swimming Championships – Women's 200 metre individual medley =

The women's 200m individual medley events at the 2022 World Para Swimming Championships were held at the Penteada Olympic Swimming Complex in Madeira between 12 and 18 June.

== Medalists ==
Event	Gold	Silver	Bronze
SM5	Monica Boggioni; Italy	Giulia Ghiretti; Italy	Maori Yui; Japan
SM6	Maisie Summers-Newton; United Kingdom	Grace Harvey; United Kingdom	Nicole Turner; Ireland
SM7	Julia Gaffney; United States	Tess Routliffe; Canada	Camille Bérubé; Canada
SM8	Xenia Palazzo; Italy	Mira Jeanne Maack; Germany	Laura Carolina González Rodríguez; Colombia
SM9	Zsofia Konkoly; Hungary	Sarai Gascon; Spain	Anastasiya Dmytriv; Spain
SM10	Lisa Kruger; Netherlands	Bianka Pap; Hungary	Jasmine Greenwood; Australia
SM11	Anastasia Pagonis; United States	Martina Rabbolini; Italy	Matilde Alcázar; Mexico
SM13	Colleen Young; United States	Carlotta Gilli; Italy	Gia Pergolini; United States
SM14	Bethany Firth; Great Britain	Jessica-Jane Applegate; Great Britain	Louise Fiddes; Great Britain

== Results ==
=== SM5 ===
Final

Eight swimmers from six nations took part.

Rank	Name	Nation	Result	Notes
1st place, gold medalist(s)	Monica Boggioni	Italy	3:40.27	
2nd place, silver medalist(s)	Giulia Ghiretti	Italy	3:44.50	
3rd place, bronze medalist(s)	Maori Yui	Japan	3:47.10	
4	Solène Sache	France	4:08.75	
5	Clémence Paré	Canada	4:45.69	
6	Jessica Tinney	Canada	4:46.87	
7	Meryem Nur Tunug	Turkey	4:48.94	
	Ana Laura Morales Lopez	Mexico	DSQ	

=== SM7 ===
Final

Eight swimmers from five nations took part.

Rank	Name	Nation	Result	Notes
1st place, gold medalist(s)	Julia Gaffney	United States	2:55.28	
2nd place, silver medalist(s)	Tess Routliffe	Canada	3:00.75	
3rd place, bronze medalist(s)	Camille Bérubé	Canada	3:05.40	
4	Ahalya Lettenberger	United States	3:05.53	
5	Danielle Dorris	Canada	3:06.82	
6	Naomi Somellera Mandujano	Mexico	3:17.50	
7	Katherina Rösler	Germany	3:37.80	
8	Sofiia Khylymendyk	Ukraine	3:55.34	

=== SM9 ===
Final

Eight swimmers from five nations took part.

Rank	Name	Nation	Result	Notes
1st place, gold medalist(s)	Zsófia Konkoly	Hungary	2:34.21	
2nd place, silver medalist(s)	Sarai Gascon	Spain	2:34.87	
3rd place, bronze medalist(s)	Anastasiya Dmytriv	Spain	2:38.59	
4	Summer Schmit	United States	2:39.92	
5	Toni Shaw	United Kingdom	2:40.60	
6	Katarina Roxon	Canada	2:43.34	
7	Brock Whiston	United Kingdom	2:43.37	
8	Hannah Aspden	United States	2:50.93	

=== SM11 ===
Final

Six swimmers from five nations took part.

Rank	Name	Nation	Result	Notes
1st place, gold medalist(s)	Anastasia Pagonis	United States	2:49.73	
2nd place, silver medalist(s)	Martina Rabbolini	Italy	3:05.70	
3rd place, bronze medalist(s)	Matilde Alcázar	Mexico	3:09.11	
4	Scarlett Humphrey	United Kingdom	3:10.16	
5	Eliza Humphrey	United Kingdom	3:12.44	
6	Nadia Báez	Argentina	3:25.71	
