= Swimming at the 2020 Summer Paralympics – Women's 4 × 100 metre freestyle relay 34pts =

Women's 4 × 100 metre freestyle relay - 34 points at the XVI Paralympic Games
- Venue: Tokyo Aquatics Centre
- Dates: 29 August 2021
- Competitors: 32 from 8 nations

Medalists
1st place, gold medalist(s)		Italy (ITA)
2nd place, silver medalist(s)		Australia (AUS)
3rd place, bronze medalist(s)		Canada (CAN)

The women's 4 × 100 metre freestyle relay - 34 points swimming events for the 2020 Summer Paralympics took place at the Tokyo Aquatics Centre on 29 August 2021.

== Competition format ==
Relay teams are based on a point score. The sport class of an individual swimmer is worth the actual number value i.e. sport class S6 is worth six points, sport class S12 is worth twelve points, and so on. The total of all the competitors must add up to 34 points or less.

== Records ==
Prior to the competition, the World record was as follows:

World record	Australia	4:16.65	Rio de Janeiro, Brazil	15 September 2016
Paralympic record	Australia	4:16.65	Rio de Janeiro, Brazil	15 September 2016

== Final ==
19:39 29 August 2021:

Rank	Lane	Nation	Swimmers	Time	Notes
1st place, gold medalist(s)	3	Italy	Xenia Francesca Palazzo (S8) (1:07.06); Vittoria Bianco (S9) (1:07.55); Giulia Terzi (S7) (1:08.75); Alessia Scortechini (S10) (1:01.49)	4:24.85	
2nd place, silver medalist(s)	7	Australia	Ellie Cole (S9) (1:03.41); Isabella Vincent (S7) (1:15.78); Emily Beecroft (S9) (1:04.24); Ashleigh McConnell (S9) (1:03.39)	4:26.82	
3rd place, bronze medalist(s)	6	Canada	Morgan Bird (S8) (1:11.66); Katarina Roxon (S9) (1:06.91); Sabrina Duchesne (S7) (1:13.73); Aurelie Rivard (S10) (58.10)	4:30.40	
4	2	China	Jialing Xu (S9) (1:05.37); Zhang Meng (S10) (1:02.63); Jiang Yuyan (S6) (1:11.25); Lingling Song (S6) (1:13.96)	4:33.21	
5	1	Hungary	Zsófia Konkoly (S9) (1:04.10); Fanni Illés (S6) (1:23.14); Kata Payer (S9) (1:09.10); Bianka Pap (S10) (1:02.32)	4:38.66	
6	8	RPC	Ani Palian (S7) (1:17.44); Mariia Pavlova (S8) (1:13.33); Elena Kliachkina (S9) (1:08.57); Anastasiia Gontar (S10) (1:02.44)	4:41.78	
	4	Great Britain	Stephanie Millward (S9) (1:07.81); Zara Mullooly (S10); Grace Harvey (S6); Toni Shaw (S9)	DSQ	
	5	United States	Natalie Sims (S9) (1:05.28); Morgan Stickney (S8); Jessica Long (S8); Hannah Aspden (S9)	DSQ	
