= Swimming at the 2020 Summer Paralympics – Women's 100 metre backstroke S9 =

Women's 100 metre backstroke S9 at the XVI Paralympic Games
- Venue: Tokyo Aquatics Centre
- Dates: 30 August 2021
- Competitors: 7 from 6 nations

Medalists
| 1st place, gold medalist(s) | | Hannah Aspden | United States |
| 2nd place, silver medalist(s) | | Núria Marquès | Spain |
| 3rd place, bronze medalist(s) | | Sophie Pascoe | New Zealand |

The Women's 100 metre backstroke S9 event at the 2020 Paralympic Games took place on 30 August 2021, at the Tokyo Aquatics Centre.

== Final ==
100m backstroke final
| Rank | Lane | Name | Nationality | Time | Notes |
|---|---|---|---|---|---|
| 1st place, gold medalist(s) | 4 | Hannah Aspden | United States | 1:09.22 | |
| 2nd place, silver medalist(s) | 5 | Núria Marquès Soto | Spain | 1:10.26 | |
| 3rd place, bronze medalist(s) | 3 | Sophie Pascoe | New Zealand | 1:11.15 | |
| 4 | 6 | Ellie Cole | Australia | 1:13.15 | |
| 5 | 7 | Elizabeth Smith | United States | 1:14.24 | |
| 6 | 1 | Zsofia Konkoly | Hungary | 1:14.38 | |
| 7 | 2 | Lina Watz | Sweden | 1:14.86 | |
| 8 | 8 | Stephanie Millward | Great Britain | 1:15.49 | |
