= Swimming at the 2020 Summer Paralympics – Women's 100 metre freestyle S7 =

Women's 100 metre freestyle S7 at the XVI Paralympic Games
- Venue: Tokyo Aquatics Centre
- Dates: 31 August 2021
- Competitors: 13 from 8 nations

Medalists
| 1st place, gold medalist(s) | | Giulia Terzi | Italy |
| 2nd place, silver medalist(s) | | McKenzie Coan | United States |
| 3rd place, bronze medalist(s) | | Yelyzaveta Mereshko | Ukraine |

The Women's 100 metre freestyle S7 event at the 2020 Paralympic Games took place on 31 August 2021, at the Tokyo Aquatics Centre.

== Heats ==
The swimmers with the top eight times, regardless of heat, advanced to the final.

| Rank | Heat | Lane | Name | Nationality | Time | Notes |
|---|---|---|---|---|---|---|
| 1 | 2 | 4 | McKenzie Coan | United States | 1:10.68 | Q |
| 2 | 1 | 4 | Giulia Terzi | Italy | 1:11.70 | Q |
| 3 | 2 | 5 | Yelyzaveta Mereshko | Ukraine | 1:12.29 | Q |
| 4 | 2 | 3 | Jiang Yuyan | China | 1:12.49 | Q |
| 5 | 1 | 5 | Mallory Weggemann | United States | 1:12.54 | Q |
| 6 | 2 | 6 | Ani Palian | RPC | 1:14.40 | Q |
| 7 | 1 | 3 | Julia Gaffney | United States | 1:14.65 | Q |
| 8 | 1 | 2 | Sabrina Duchesne | Canada | 1:14.95 | Q |
| 9 | 2 | 7 | Laila Suzigan | Brazil | 1:17.12 | |
| 10 | 2 | 2 | Isabella Vincent | Australia | 1:17.44 | |
| 11 | 1 | 6 | Shelby Newkirk | Canada | 1:19.06 | |
| 12 | 2 | 1 | Camille Bérubé | Canada | 1:19.64 | |
| 13 | 1 | 7 | Erel Halevi | Israel | 1:20.08 | |

== Final ==
100m freestyle final
| Rank | Lane | Name | Nationality | Time | Notes |
|---|---|---|---|---|---|
| 1st place, gold medalist(s) | 5 | Giulia Terzi | Italy | 1:09.21 | PR, ER |
| 2nd place, silver medalist(s) | 4 | McKenzie Coan | United States | 1:10.22 | |
| 3rd place, bronze medalist(s) | 3 | Yelyzaveta Mereshko | Ukraine | 1:11.07 | |
| 3rd place, bronze medalist(s) | 6 | Jiang Yuyan | China | 1:11.07 | |
| 5 | 2 | Mallory Weggemann | United States | 1:11.98 | |
| 6 | 8 | Sabrina Duchesne | Canada | 1:14.55 | |
| 7 | 7 | Ani Palian | RPC | 1:15.38 | |
| 8 | 1 | Julia Gaffney | United States | 1:15.70 | |
