= Swimming at the 2020 Summer Paralympics – Women's 400 metre freestyle S7 =

Women's 400 metre freestyle S7 at the XVI Paralympic Games
- Venue: Tokyo Aquatics Centre
- Dates: 29 August 2021
- Competitors: 8 from 6 nations

Medalists
1st place, gold medalist(s)		McKenzie Coan	United States
2nd place, silver medalist(s)		Giulia Terzi	Italy
3rd place, bronze medalist(s)		Julia Gaffney	United States

The Women's 400 metre freestyle S7 event at the 2020 Paralympic Games took place on 29 August 2021, at the Tokyo Aquatics Centre.

== Final ==
400m freestyle final
Rank	Lane	Name	Nationality	Time	Notes
1st place, gold medalist(s)	4	McKenzie Coan	United States	5:05.84	
2nd place, silver medalist(s)	5	Giulia Terzi	Italy	5:06.32	
3rd place, bronze medalist(s)	3	Julia Gaffney	United States	5:11.89	
4	6	Ahalya Lettenberger	United States	5:13.55	
5	2	Sabrina Duchesne	Canada	5:20.59	
6	1	Sakura Koike	Japan	5:34.12	
7	7	Erel Halevi	Israel	5:44.97	
8	8	Naomi Somellera Mandujano	Mexico	5:54.31	
