= Wheelchair basketball at the 2012 Summer Paralympics – Men's team rosters =

This is a list of players that participated in the men's wheelchair basketball competition at the Games of the XIV Paralympiad.

== Group A ==
=== Australia ===
The following is the Australia roster in the men's wheelchair basketball tournament of the 2012 Summer Paralympics.

Australia men's national wheelchair basketball team – 2012 Summer Paralympics roster
Players
Coaches

No.	Name	Age – Date of birth	Pts.	Club	Ctr.
4	Justin Eveson	32 – 10 June 1980		Be Active Perth Wheelcats	(Australia)
5	Bill Latham	22 – 20 October 1989		RSL Qld Spinning Bullets	(Australia)
6	Brett Stibners	33 – 25 June 1979		Wollongong Roller Hawks	(Australia)
7	Shaun Norris	27 – 2 April 1985		Be Active Perth Wheelcats	(Australia)
8	Michael Hartnett	30 – 3 June 1982		Be Active Perth Wheelcats	(Australia)
9	Tristan Knowles	29 – 25 April 1983		Wollongong Roller Hawks	(Australia)
10	Jannik Blair	20 – 3 February 1992		Vic Dandenong Rangers	(Australia)
11	Tige Simmons	35 – 5 May 1977		RSL Qld Spinning Bullets	(Australia)
12	Grant Mizens	35 – 19 April 1977		Wollongong Roller Hawks	(Australia)
13	Dylan Alcott	21 – 4 December 1990		Vic Dandenong Rangers	(Australia)
14	Nick Taylor	32 – 18 January 1980		Wollongong Roller Hawks	(Australia)
15	Brad Ness	37 – 24 November 1974		Be Active Perth Wheelcats	(Australia)

Head coach

- (Australia) Ben Ettridge

Assistant coach(es)

- (Australia) Matteo Feriani
- (Australia) Thomas Kyle

Legend

- Club – describes last
  club before the tournament
- Age – describes age
  on 30 August 2012

=== United States ===
The following is the United States roster in the men's wheelchair basketball tournament of the 2012 Summer Paralympics.

United States men's national wheelchair basketball team – 2012 Summer Paralympics roster
Players
Coaches

No.	Name	Age – Date of birth	Pts.
	Eric Barber	–
	Joe Chambers	30 – January 10, 1982
	Jeremy Lade	31 – January 6, 1981
	Joshua Turek	–
	Trevon Jenifer	23 – September 7, 1988
	William Waller	–
	Matt Scott	27 – March 27, 1985
	Steve Serio	24 – September 8, 1987
	Jason Nelms	–
	Ian Lynch	–
	Paul Schulte	–
	Nate Hinze	24 – June 12, 1988

Legend

- Club – describes last
  club before the tournament
- Age – describes age
  on 30 August 2012

== Group B ==
=== Canada ===
The following is the Canada roster in the men's wheelchair basketball tournament of the 2012 Summer Paralympics.

Canada men's national wheelchair basketball team - 2012 Summer Paralympics roster
Players
Coaches

No.	Name	Age – Date of birth	Pts.
4	Dave Durepos	44 – 14 July 1968	3.5	Elm City Sports Club
5	Yvon Rouillard	40 – 19 April 1972	3.0	Amnic Sassari
6	Robert Hedges	32 – 5 January 1980	2.5	Douglas College
7	Richard Peter	39 – 10 September 1972	2.5	Douglas College
8	Joey Johnson	37 – 26 July 1975	4.5	RSV Lahn-Dill
9	Adam Lancia	32 – 17 January 1980	4.0	BSR Valladolid, Variety Village
10	Abdi Dini	31 – 1 January 1981	1.0	Variety Village
11	Chad Jassman	28 – 16 September 1983	1.5	Trier Dolphins, Calgary Grizzlies
12	Patrick Anderson	33 – 22 August 1979	4.5
13	Brandon Wagner	29 – 18 April 1983	1.0	Burlington Vipers
14	Tyler Miller	28 – 24 June 1984	1.5	Twin City Spinners
15	David Eng	35 – 21 November 1976	4.5	Laval Gladiateurs

Head coach

Jerry Tonello

Assistant coach(es)

Paul Bowes, Darrell Nordell, Christian La Serra

Legend

- Age - describes age on 30 August 2012

=== Germany ===
- André Bienek (3.0)
- Thomas Böhme (3.0)
- Thomas Gundert (2.0)
- Jan Haller (2.0)
- Mathias Heimbach (1.0)
- Sercan Ismail (1.0)
- Dirk Köhler (4.0)
- Andreas Kreß (3.5)
- Björn Lohmann (1.0)
- Sebastian Magenheim (3.5)
- Dirk Passiwan (4.5)
- Sebastian Wolk (4.0)

=== Great Britain ===
The following is the Great Britain roster in the men's wheelchair basketball tournament of the 2012 Summer Paralympics.

Great Britain men's national wheelchair basketball team – 2012 Summer Paralympics roster
Players
Coaches

No.	Name	Age – Date of birth	Pts.	Club	Ctr.
4	Gaz Choudhry	27 – 23 June 1985		Capital City Aces	(United Kingdom)
5	Dan Highcock	30 – 5 December 1981		Wolves Rhinos	(United Kingdom)
6	Matt Sealy	30 – 21 June 1982		Capital City Aces	(United Kingdom)
7	Terry Bywater	29 – 28 February 1983		Sheffield Steelers	(United Kingdom)
8	Simon Munn	44 – 31 January 1968		Capital City Aces	(United Kingdom)
9	Jon Pollock	35 – 11 May 1977		Wolves Rhinos	(United Kingdom)
10	Abdi Jama	29 – 1 November 1982		Wolves Rhinos	(United Kingdom)
11	Matt Byrne	37 – 8 October 1974		Wolves Rhinos	(United Kingdom)
12	Ian Sagar	30 – 29 March 1982		Thamside Owls	(United Kingdom)
13	Peter Finbow	37 – 17 May 1975		Thamside Owls	(United Kingdom)
14	Jon Hall	30 – 13 March 1982		Thamside Owls	(United Kingdom)
15	Ade Orogbemi	34 – 11 May 1978		Capital City Aces	(United Kingdom)

Legend

- Club – describes last
  club before the tournament
- Age – describes age
  on 30 August 2012
