= Swimming at the 2020 Summer Paralympics – Women's 200 metre individual medley SM7 =

Women's 200 metre individual medley SM7 at the XVI Paralympic Games
- Venue: Tokyo Aquatics Centre
- Dates: 27 August 2021
- Competitors: 9 from 5 nations

Medalists
1st place, gold medalist(s)		Mallory Weggemann	United States
2nd place, silver medalist(s)		Ahalya Lettenberger	United States
3rd place, bronze medalist(s)		Tiffany Thomas Kane	Australia

The Women's 200 metre individual medley SM7 event at the 2020 Paralympic Games took place on 27 August 2021, at the Tokyo Aquatics Centre.

== Heats ==
The swimmers with the top eight times, regardless of heat, advanced to the final.

Rank	Heat	Lane	Name	Nationality	Time	Notes
1	2	4	Mallory Weggemann	United States	2:54.25	Q, PR
2	2	5	Ahalya Lettenberger	United States	3:05.06	Q
3	2	3	Camille Bérubé	Canada	3:06.64	Q
4	1	3	Danielle Dorris	Canada	3:07.53	Q
5	1	5	Tiffany Thomas Kane	Australia	3:09.27	Q
6	2	6	Isabella Vincent	Australia	3:15.78	Q
7	1	6	Naomi Somellera Mandujano	Mexico	3:23.80	Q
8	2	2	Gisell Prada	Colombia	3:31.61	Q
-	1	4	Julia Gaffney	United States	DSQ	

== Final ==
Rank	Lane	Name	Nationality	Time	Notes
1st place, gold medalist(s)	4	Mallory Weggemann	United States	2:55.48	
2nd place, silver medalist(s)	5	Ahalya Lettenberger	United States	3:02.82	
3rd place, bronze medalist(s)	2	Tiffany Thomas Kane	Australia	3:03.11	
4	6	Danielle Dorris	Canada	3:03.16	
5	3	Camille Bérubé	Canada	3:03.91	
6	7	Isabella Vincent	Australia	3:13.46	
7	8	Gisell Prada	Colombia	3:29.27	
-	1	Naomi Somellera Mandujano	Mexico	DSQ	
