= Swimming at the 2020 Summer Paralympics – Women's 50 metre butterfly S7 =

Women's 50 metre butterfly S7 at the XVI Paralympic Games
- Venue: Tokyo Aquatics Centre
- Dates: 3 September 2021
- Competitors: 11 from 8 nations

Medalists
1st place, gold medalist(s)		Danielle Dorris	Canada
2nd place, silver medalist(s)		Mallory Weggemann	United States
3rd place, bronze medalist(s)		Giulia Terzi	Italy

The Women's 50 metre butterfly S7 event at the 2020 Paralympic Games took place on 3 September 2021, at the Tokyo Aquatics Centre.

== Heats ==
The swimmers with the top 8 times, regardless of heat, advanced to the final.

Rank	Heat	Lane	Name	Nationality	Time	Notes
1	1	5	Danielle Dorris	Canada	33.51	Q, WR
2	2	4	Mallory Weggemann	United States	34.92	Q
3	1	4	Giulia Terzi	Italy	35.40	Q
4	2	2	Ani Palian	RPC	35.71	Q
5	2	5	Julia Gaffney	United States	36.14	Q
6	1	3	McKenzie Coan	United States	38.08	Q
7	2	6	An Nishida	Japan	38.39	Q
8	2	3	Nikita Howarth	New Zealand	38.46	Q
9	1	6	Tiffany Thomas Kane	Australia	39.64	
10	2	7	Camille Bérubé	Canada	42.35	
-	1	2	Naomi Somellera Mandujano	Mexico	DNS	

== Final ==
Rank	Lane	Name	Nationality	Time	Notes
1st place, gold medalist(s)	4	Danielle Dorris	Canada	32.99	WR
2nd place, silver medalist(s)	5	Mallory Weggemann	United States	34.30	
3rd place, bronze medalist(s)	3	Giulia Terzi	Italy	34.32	ER
4	6	Ani Palian	RPC	35.73	
5	2	Julia Gaffney	United States	35.74	
6	8	Nikita Howarth	New Zealand	36.92	
7	7	McKenzie Coan	United States	37.47	
8	1	An Nishida	Japan	37.98	
