= Swimming at the 2020 Summer Paralympics – Women's 200 metre individual medley SM9 =

Women's 200 metre individual medley SM9 at the XVI Paralympic Games
- Venue: Tokyo Aquatics Centre
- Dates: 1 September 2021
- Competitors: 17 from 13 nations

Medalists
1st place, gold medalist(s)		Sophie Pascoe	New Zealand
2nd place, silver medalist(s)		Zsofia Konkoly	Hungary
3rd place, bronze medalist(s)		Núria Marquès Soto	Spain

The Women's 200 metre individual medley SM9 event at the 2020 Paralympic Games took place on 1 September 2021, at the Tokyo Aquatics Centre.

== Heats ==
The swimmers with the top eight times, regardless of heat, advanced to the final.

Rank	Heat	Lane	Name	Nationality	Time	Notes
1	3	4	Sophie Pascoe	New Zealand	2:34.55	Q
2	1	4	Zsofia Konkoly	Hungary	2:35.16	Q
3	2	4	Núria Marquès Soto	Spain	2:38.79	Q
4	3	5	Xu Jialing	China	2:39.88	Q
5	3	3	Summer Schmit	United States	2:40.27	Q
6	2	3	Daniela Giménez	Argentina	2:40.94	Q
7	1	5	Ellen Keane	Ireland	2:40.99	Q
8	2	5	Sarai Gascón Moreno	Spain	2:41.78	Q
9	2	6	Natalie Sims	United States	2:43.95	
10	1	3	Katarina Roxon	Canada	2:47.09	
11	3	6	Hannah Aspden	United States	2:48.46	
12	2	2	Yuliya Gordiychuk	Israel	2:52.48	
13	3	2	Mikuni Utsugi	Japan	2:53.28	
14	1	6	Elena Kliachkina	RPC	2:54.07	
15	1	2	Claire Supiot	France	2:55.56	
16	3	7	Kata Payer	Hungary	2:57.29	
17	2	7	Camila Haase	Costa Rica	DSQ	

== Final ==
Rank	Lane	Name	Nationality	Time	Notes
1st place, gold medalist(s)	4	Sophie Pascoe	New Zealand	2:32.73	
2nd place, silver medalist(s)	5	Zsofia Konkoly	Hungary	2:33.00	
3rd place, bronze medalist(s)	3	Núria Marquès Soto	Spain	2:35.64	
4	8	Sarai Gascón Moreno	Spain	2:37.62	
5	1	Ellen Keane	Ireland	2:38.64	
6	2	Summer Schmit	United States	2:38.64	
7	6	Xu Jialing	China	2:38.90	
8	7	Daniela Giménez	Argentina	2:39.60	
