= Swimming at the 2020 Summer Paralympics – Women's 400 metre freestyle S9 =

Women's 400 metre freestyle S9 at the XVI Paralympic Games
- Venue: Tokyo Aquatics Centre
- Dates: 25 August 2021
- Competitors: 14 from 10 nations

Medalists
1st place, gold medalist(s)		Lakeisha Patterson	Australia
2nd place, silver medalist(s)		Zsofia Konkoly	Hungary
3rd place, bronze medalist(s)		Toni Shaw	Great Britain

The Women's 400 metre freestyle S9 event at the 2020 Paralympic Games took place on 25 August 2021, at the Tokyo Aquatics Centre.

== Heats ==
The swimmers with the top eight times, regardless of heat, advanced to the final.

Rank	Heat	Lane	Name	Nationality	Time	Notes
1	1	5	Zsofia Konkoly	Hungary	4:44.74	Q
2	1	4	Toni Shaw	Great Britain	4:46.19	Q
3	2	5	Ellie Cole	Australia	4:48.29	Q
4	2	4	Lakeisha Patterson	Australia	4:49.91	Q
5	1	3	Nuria Marqués Soto	Spain	4:53.53	Q
6	2	3	Xu Jialing	China	4:54.94	Q
7	1	2	Natalie Sims	United States	4:56.51	Q
8	2	7	Summer Schmit	United States	4:57.11	Q
9	2	2	Vittoria Bianco	Italy	4:57.51	
10	1	6	Yuliya Gordiychuk	Israel	4:58.40	
11	2	6	Claire Supiot	France	5:00.28	
12	1	7	Keegan Knott	United States	5:00.92	
13	2	1	Lina Watz	Sweden	5:11.19	
14	1	1	Kata Payer	Hungary	5:23.14	

== Final ==
400m freestyle final
Rank	Lane	Name	Nationality	Time	Notes
1st place, gold medalist(s)	6	Lakeisha Patterson	Australia	4:36.68	
2nd place, silver medalist(s)	4	Zsofia Konkoly	Hungary	4:36.76	
3rd place, bronze medalist(s)	5	Toni Shaw	Great Britain	4:39.32	
4	3	Ellie Cole	Australia	4:43.98	
5	7	Xu Jialing	China	4:51.00	
6	2	Nuria Marqués Soto	Spain	4:52.64	
7	8	Summer Schmit	United States	4:56.92	
8	1	Natalie Sims	United States	4:58.55	
