= Swimming at the 2020 Summer Paralympics – Women's 100 metre breaststroke SB7 =

Women's 100 metre breaststroke SB7 at the XVI Paralympic Games
- Venue: Tokyo Aquatics Centre
- Dates: 1 September 2021
- Competitors: 11 from 10 nations

Medalists
1st place, gold medalist(s)		Mariia Pavlova	RPC
2nd place, silver medalist(s)		Jessica Long	United States
3rd place, bronze medalist(s)		Tiffany Thomas Kane	Australia

The Women's 100 metre breaststroke SB7 event at the 2020 Paralympic Games took place on 1 September 2021, at the Tokyo Aquatics Centre.

== Heats ==
The swimmers with the top eight times, regardless of heat, advanced to the final.

Rank	Heat	Lane	Name	Nationality	Time	Notes
1	1	4	Mariia Pavlova	RPC	1:33.15	Q
2	2	4	Tiffany Thomas Kane	Australia	1:34.90	Q
3	2	5	Nikita Howarth	New Zealand	1:36.05	Q
4	1	5	Jessica Long	United States	1:37.39	Q
5	1	3	Naomi Somellera Mandujano	Mexico	1:41.77	Q
6	1	6	Gisell Prada	Colombia	1:42.59	Q
7	1	2	Vendula Dušková	Czech Republic	1:43.05	Q
8	2	7	Amalie Vinther	Denmark	1:48.79	Q
9	2	2	Haven Shepherd	United States	1:56.26	
-	2	3	Abi Tripp	Canada	DSQ	
-	2	6	Mira Jeanne Maack	Germany	DSQ	

== Final ==
Rank	Lane	Name	Nationality	Time	Notes
1st place, gold medalist(s)	4	Mariia Pavlova	RPC	1:31.44	
2nd place, silver medalist(s)	6	Jessica Long	United States	1:34.82	
3rd place, bronze medalist(s)	5	Tiffany Thomas Kane	Australia	1:35.02	
4	3	Nikita Howarth	New Zealand	1:36.65	
5	2	Naomi Somellera Mandujano	Mexico	1:39.41	
6	7	Gisell Prada	Colombia	1:41.11	
7	1	Vendula Dušková	Czech Republic	1:42.69	
8	8	Amalie Vinther	Denmark	1:47.84	
