= Matt Lesperance =

American wheelchair basketball player

Matthew Lesperance
Personal information
- Nickname: Matt
- Nationality: American
- Born: May 23, 1987 (age 39) Marinette, Wisconsin, U.S.
- Height: 5 ft 4 in (1.63 m)

Sport
- Sport: Wheelchair basketball
- Disability: Transverse myelitis
- Disability class: 1.0
- College team: University of Wisconsin-Whitewater Warhawks
- Coached by: Tracy Chynoweth, Jeremy Lade, Steve Wilson, Ron Lykins
Medal record
Representing the United States
Men's wheelchair basketball
Paralympic Games
Gold medal – first place	2020 Tokyo	Team
World Championship
Bronze medal – third place	2010 Birmingham	Team
Parapan American Games
Gold medal – first place	2019 Lima	Team

Matthew Lesperance (born May 23, 1987) is an American wheelchair basketball player and a member of the United States men's national wheelchair basketball team. Lesperance has represented the United States at the Paralympic Games twice, finishing in fourth place in 2008, and winning a gold medal in 2020.

== Early life ==
Lesperance was born in Marinette, Wisconsin to Tony and Brenda Lesperance. At nine years old Lesperance was diagnosed with transverse myelitis, which is a rare neurological condition in which the spinal cord is inflamed. After his injury, the Lesperance family befriended a family in Suring, WI whose son played wheelchair basketball and invited Matt to attend a fundraising event in Green Bay. Lesperance attended Coleman high school and had 47 students in his graduating class. In high school, Lesperance joined the Mad City Bombers (now Mad City Badgers), a team in the Junior Division of the NWBA. During the summers, he attended University of Wisconsin-Whitewater's wheelchair basketball camp.

== College career ==
After graduating high school in 2006, Lesperance joined the UW-Whitewater Warhawk's men's wheelchair basketball team, where he was coached by Tracy Chynoweth. At the culmination of the 2006–2007 season, Whitewater won the National Intercollegiate Wheelchair Basketball Tournament (NIWBT). His sophomore year, the Warhawks went 25-6 and finished second at the NIWBT. That summer, Tracy Chynoweth was succeeded by Jeremy "Opie" Lade as coach of the Warhawks. Lesperance would go on to win two more championships with Lade's Warhawks, in 2009 and 2011.

== National team career ==
In 2007, Lesperance attended tryouts for Team USA and was not selected, describing his first tryout as "a big learning experience." In 2008, Lesperance again attended tryouts and was selected to compete in the 2008 Summer Paralympic Games in Beijing, China, where he was coached by Steve Wilson and assistant coach Tracy Chynoweth. In Beijing, Team USA finished fourth after losing a hard-fought game to Team Canada in the semi-final round, then dropping the third place game to Great Britain.

Despite not being selected for the 2012 and 2016 games, Lesperance continued to train at a high level with NWBA Division I's Milwaukee Wheelchair Bucks. Lesperance was selected to compete in the 2020 Summer Paralympics, which were later postponed due to the outbreak of COVID-19. The next September, Lesperance was part of the gold medal-winning Team USA that defeated Team Japan to secure back-to-back golds in wheelchair basketball.

== NWBA career ==
Lesperance continues to play in NWBA's Division I for the Milwaukee Wheelchair Bucks alongside his USA teammates Jeremy Lade and Nate Hinze under Coach Wilson. In their 2020–2021 season, Lesperance and the Bucks finished second at the National Tournament to the Dallas Mavericks. He incorporates CrossFit training into his strength and conditioning regimen, attending CrossFit Vultus in Sun Prairie, Wisconsin.
