= Swimming at the 2020 Summer Paralympics – Women's 4 × 100 metre medley relay 34pts =

Women's 4 × 100 metre medley relay - 34 points at the XVI Paralympic Games
- Venue: Tokyo Aquatics Centre
- Dates: 2 September 2021
- Competitors: from 8 nations

Medalists
1st place, gold medalist(s)		United States (USA)
2nd place, silver medalist(s)		RPC (RPC)
3rd place, bronze medalist(s)		Australia (AUS)

The women's 4 × 100 metre medley relay - 34 points swimming events for the 2020 Summer Paralympics took place at the Tokyo Aquatics Centre on 2 September 2021.

== Competition format ==
Relay teams are based on a point score. The sport class of an individual swimmer is worth the actual number value i.e. sport class S6 is worth six points, sport class S12 is worth twelve points, and so on. The total of all the competitors must add up to 34 points or less.

== Final ==
Rank	Lane	Nation	Swimmers	Time	Notes
1st place, gold medalist(s)	5	United States	Hannah Aspden (S9); Mikaela Jenkins (SB9); Jessica Long (S8); Morgan Stickney (S8)	4:52.40	
2nd place, silver medalist(s)	1	RPC	Anastasiia Gontar (S10); Elizaveta Sidorenko (SB9); Viktoriia Ishchiulova (S8); Ani Palian (S7)	4:55.55	
3rd place, bronze medalist(s)	2	Australia	Ellie Cole (S9); Keira Stephens (SB9); Emily Beecroft (S9); Isabella Vincent (S7)	4:55.70	
4	4	Great Britain	Stephanie Millward (S9); Maisie Summers-Newton (SB6); Toni Shaw (S9); Zara Mullooly (S10)	4:58.76	
5	3	Spain	Nuria Marqués Soto (S9); Sarai Gascón Moreno (SB9); Isabel Yingüa Hernández (S10); Teresa Perales (S5)	5:04.58	
	6	Canada	Danielle Kisser (S6); Katarina Roxon (SB8); Morgan Bird (S8); Abi Tripp (S8)	DSQ	
	7	China	Jiang Yuyan (S6); Zhang Meng (SB9); Xu Jialing (S9); Song Lingling (S6)	DSQ	
