= Swimming at the 2020 Summer Paralympics – Women's 100 metre butterfly S9 =

Women's 100 metre butterfly S9 at the XVI Paralympic Games
- Venue: Tokyo Aquatics Centre
- Dates: 2 September 2021
- Competitors: 9 from 8 nations

Medalists
1st place, gold medalist(s)		Zsófia Konkoly	Hungary
2nd place, silver medalist(s)		Elizabeth Smith	United States
3rd place, bronze medalist(s)		Sarai Gascón Moreno	Spain

The Women's 100 metre butterfly S9 event at the 2020 Paralympic Games took place on 2 September 2021, at the Tokyo Aquatics Centre.

== Heats ==
The swimmers with the top eight times, regardless of heat, advanced to the final.

Rank	Heat	Lane	Name	Nationality	Time	Notes
1	1	4	Zsófia Konkoly	Hungary	1:07.05	Q, ER
2	2	3	Elizabeth Smith	United States	1:08.03	Q, AM
3	2	4	Sophie Pascoe	New Zealand	1:09.58	Q
4	2	5	Toni Shaw	Great Britain	1:10.41	Q
5	1	3	Sarai Gascón Moreno	Spain	1:10.63	Q
6	1	6	Yuliya Gordiychuk	Israel	1:13.08	Q
7	2	6	Summer Schmit	United States	1:13.46	Q
8	2	2	Claire Supiot	France	1:18.94	Q
-	1	5	Xu Jialing	China	DSQ	

== Final ==
Rank	Lane	Name	Nationality	Time	Notes
1st place, gold medalist(s)	4	Zsófia Konkoly	Hungary	1:06.55	PR, ER
2nd place, silver medalist(s)	5	Elizabeth Smith	United States	1:08.22	
3rd place, bronze medalist(s)	2	Sarai Gascón Moreno	Spain	1:08.43	
4	6	Toni Shaw	Great Britain	1:08.87	
5	3	Sophie Pascoe	New Zealand	1:09.31	
6	1	Summer Schmit	United States	1:12.95	
7	7	Yuliya Gordiychuk	Israel	1:13.35	
8	8	Claire Supiot	France	1:16.67	
