= 2022 World Para Swimming Championships – Women's 400 metre freestyle =

The women's 400m freestyle events at the 2022 World Para Swimming Championships were held at the Penteada Olympic Swimming Complex in Madeira between 12 and 18 June.

== Medalists ==
Event	Gold	Silver	Bronze
S6	Maisie Summers-Newton; United Kingdom	Laila Suzigan; Brazil	Nora Meister; Switzerland
S7	McKenzie Coan; United States	Giulia Terzi; Italy	Ahalya Lettenberger; United States
S8	Morgan Stickney; United States	Xenia Palazzo; Italy	Nahia Zudaire Borrezo; Spain
S9	Toni Shaw; Great Britain	Zsófia Konkoly; Hungary	Summer Schmit; United States
S10	Bianka Pap; Hungary	Oliwia Jablonska; Poland	Csenge Hotz; Hungary
S11	Anastasia Pagonis; United States	Liesette Bruinsma; Netherlands	Matilde Alcázar; Mexico
S13	Anna Stetsenko; Ukraine	Katja Dedekind; Australia	Carlotta Gilli; Italy

== Results ==
=== S7 ===
Final

7 swimmers from six nations took part.

Rank	Name	Nation	Result	Notes
1st place, gold medalist(s)	McKenzie Coan	United States	5:10.36	
2nd place, silver medalist(s)	Giulia Terzi	Italy	5:19.75	
3rd place, bronze medalist(s)	Ahalya Lettenberger	Spain	5:22.11	
4	Sabrina Duchesne	Canada	5:34.42	
5	Agnes Kramer	Sweden	6:01.71	
6	Denise Grahl	Germany	6:07.06	
7	Ida Andersson Wulf	Sweden	6:24.65	

=== S8 ===
Heats

11 swimmers from ten nations took part. The swimmers with the top eight times, regardless of heat, advanced to the final.

Rank	Heat	Lane	Name	Nation	Result	Notes
1	2	4	Morgan Stickney	United States	4:53.01	Q
2	2	5	Nahia Zudaire Borrezo	Spain	5:09.20	Q
3	1	4	Xenia Palazzo	Italy	5:14.87	Q
4	1	6	Paola Ruvalcaba	Mexico	5:19.25	Q
5	1	3	Jade Le Bris	France	5:21.09	Q
6	2	3	Abi Tripp	Canada	5:23.26	Q
7	1	5	Mira Jeanne Maack	Germany	5:23.82	Q
8	2	2	Natalia Guemez	Mexico	5:44.57	Q
9	1	2	Ana Castro	Portugal	5:48.14	
10	2	7	Nikola Badowska	Poland	6:04.37	
	2	6	Vendula Dušková	Czech Republic	DNS	

Final

The final was held on 12 June 2022.

Rank	Name	Nation	Result	Notes
1st place, gold medalist(s)	Morgan Stickney	United States	4:50.18	
2nd place, silver medalist(s)	Xenia Palazzo	Italy	5:02.54	
3rd place, bronze medalist(s)	Nahia Zudaire Borrezo	Spain	5:05.40	
4	Paola Ruvalcaba	Mexico	5:16.89	
5	Abi Tripp	Canada	5:18.58	
6	Mira Jeanne Maack	Germany	5:23.04	
7	Jade Le Bris	France	5:23.40	
8	Natalia Guemez	Mexico	5:41.24	
