= Swimming at the 2020 Summer Paralympics – Women's 100 metre backstroke S7 =

Women's 100 metre backstroke S7 at the XVI Paralympic Games
- Venue: Tokyo Aquatics Centre
- Dates: 30 August 2021
- Competitors: 6 from 3 nations

Medalists
| 1st place, gold medalist(s) | | Mallory Weggemann | United States |
| 2nd place, silver medalist(s) | | Danielle Dorris | Canada |
| 3rd place, bronze medalist(s) | | Julia Gaffney | United States |

The Women's 100 metre backstroke S7 event at the 2020 Paralympic Games took place on 30 August 2021, at the Tokyo Aquatics Centre.

== Final ==
100m backstroke final
| Rank | Lane | Name | Nationality | Time | Notes |
|---|---|---|---|---|---|
| 1st place, gold medalist(s) | 5 | Mallory Weggemann | United States | 1:21.27 | PR |
| 2nd place, silver medalist(s) | 3 | Danielle Dorris | Canada | 1:21.91 | |
| 3rd place, bronze medalist(s) | 4 | Julia Gaffney | United States | 1:22.02 | |
| 4 | 6 | McKenzie Coan | United States | 1:23.10 | |
| 5 | 2 | Camille Bérubé | Canada | 1:25.04 | |
| 6 | 7 | Erel Halevi | Israel | 1:40.68 | |
