= Isabella Vincent (swimmer) =

Australian Paralympic swimmer

Personal information
- Nickname: Izzy
- Nationality: Australian
- Born: Isabella Dawn Vincent; 14 January 2006 (age 20) Burnside, South Australia

Sport
- Sport: Swimming
- Classifications: S7
- Club: Norwood Swimming Club
- Coach: Shaun Curtis
Medal record
Women's Paralympic swimming
Representing Australia
Paralympic Games
Silver medal – second place	2020 Tokyo	4×100 m freestyle 34 pts
Bronze medal – third place	2020 Tokyo	4×100 m medley 34pts

Isabella Vincent (born 14 January 2006) is an Australian Paralympic swimmer. At the age of fifteen, she was the youngest Australian swimmer selected for the 2020 Summer Paralympics in Tokyo, where she won a silver and bronze medal.

== Personal ==
Vincent lives in Adelaide, South Australia. She was born with sacral agenesis or caudal regression syndrome. She attended Marryatville Primary School. Since 2020, she has attended Pembroke School.

== Swimming ==
Vincent took up competitive swimming in 2018 after a stint of post-operative hydrotherapy. Joining the EnABLE program at Norwood Swimming Club with coach Alana Fuller. She is classified as an S7. At 2018 School Sport Australia Swimming Championships in Hobart she collected the most medals of any with nine – seven gold, one silver and one bronze. At the 2020 SA Short Course Swimming Championships, she won the Matthew Cowdrey Trophy for best multi-class performance.

At the 2021 Australian Swimming Trials, Vincent came first in the S7 - 400m freestyle S6-S13, 100m backstroke and second in the SM7 200m individual medley.

At the 2020 Tokyo Paralympics, Vincent, together with her team of Emily Beecroft, Ellie Cole, and Ashleigh McConnell won a silver medal in the Women's 4x100m Freestyle 34 pts with a time of 4:26.82, two seconds behind the winners, Italy. She also won a bronze medal in the 34pts Women's 4x100m Medley 34 pts. Her team of Emily Beecroft, Keira Stephens and Ellie Cole clocked 4:55.70. She swam in two individual events, finishing sixth in the Women's 200 m Individual Medley SM7, but failing to qualify in the 100 m freestyle S7.

At the 2022 Commonwealth Games, Birmingham, England, she finished 5th in the Women's 100 m backstroke S8 and the Women's 100 m breaststroke SB6.
