= Jorge Sánchez (basketball) =

American wheelchair basketball player

Personal information
- Full name: Jorge Eduardo Sánchez
- Born: October 3, 1991 (age 34) Oakland, California, U.S.
- Height: 5 ft 9 in (1.75 m)

Sport
- Sport: Wheelchair basketball
- Disability: Osteogenic sarcoma
- Disability class: 4.0
- Coached by: Domingo Jonay Caraballo Reyes; Ron Lykins
Medal record
Representing the United States
Men's wheelchair basketball
Paralympic Games
Gold medal – first place	2020 Tokyo	Team
World Championship
Gold medal – first place	2022 Dubai	Team
Silver medal – second place	2018 Hamburg	Team
Parapan American Games
Gold medal – first place	2019 Lima	Team
Gold medal – first place	2023 Santiago	Team

Jorge Eduardo Sánchez (born October 3, 1991) is an American wheelchair basketball player and a member of the United States men's national wheelchair basketball team. He represented the United States at the 2020 Summer Paralympics.

== Career ==
Sánchez represented the United States at the 2018 Wheelchair Basketball World Championship and won a silver medal.

He represented the United States in wheelchair basketball at the 2020 Summer Paralympics and won a gold medal.

He represented the United States 2022 Wheelchair Basketball World Championships and won a gold medal.
