= Marcia O'Malley =

American mechanical engineer

Marcia K. O'Malley

Chair, Mechanical Engineering George R. Brown School of Engineering and Computing
- Incumbent
- Assumed office July 1, 2023
- Preceded by: Laura Schaefer

Personal details
- Born: January 7, 1975 (age 51) Ohio, United States
- Citizenship: United States
- Education: Purdue University (BS); Vanderbilt University (MS); Vanderbilt University (PhD)

Marcia Kilchenman O'Malley is an American mechanical engineer, the Thomas Michael Panos Family Professor in Mechanical Engineering and the chair of the department of mechanical engineering for the George R. Brown School of Engineering and Computing at Rice University. Her research concerns "system for enhancing the human sensorimotor control system", including work on exoskeletons, neuroprosthetics, haptic technology, and brain-computer interfaces. She is a fellow of the American Society of Mechanical Engineers (ASME), Institute of Electrical and Electronics Engineers (IEEE), American Institute of Medical and Biological Engineering (AIMBE) and International Academy of Medical and Biological Engineering (IAMBE).

== Early life ==
O'Malley was born on January 7, 1975 in Ohio, United States. Her father was "Mr. Fix-It" and she helped him with restoring cars for her mother to drive. She loved math and science which clashed with her mother as an English teacher. O'Malley wrote a report in high school about a mechanical frame used to realign bones, which sparked her interest in engineering

== Education and career ==
O'Malley is a 1996 graduate of Purdue University, where she majored in Mechanical Engineering. She went to Vanderbilt University for her graduate study, earning a master's degree in 1999 and completed her Ph.D. in 2001.

She has been on the Rice University facility since 2001, and holds courtesy appointments in electrical and computer engineering, bioengineering, and computer science at Rice, and in physical medicine and rehabilitation at the Baylor College of Medicine and University of Texas Health Science Center at Houston. Prior to serving as department chair, she was associate dean for research and innovation at Rice University. Before being named the Thomas Michael Panos Family Professor, she was Stanley C. Moore Professor of Mechanical Engineering.

== Recognition ==
O'Malley was named an ASME Fellow in 2014. In 2019, she was named as IEEE Fellow "for contributions to rehabilitation robotics and haptic system", and in 2022 she was named a Fellow of the American Institute for Medical and Biological Engineering for her "outstanding contributions to rehabilitation robotics, haptics and robot surgery". She was named a Fellow of the International Academy of Medical and Biological Engineering in 2025 "for their outstanding contributions to the profession of medical and biological engineering".

In 2019, Purdue University gave her their Outstanding Mechanical Engineer Award. In 2020, she was named the ASME Dynamic Systems and Controls Division Nyquist Lecturer. In 2025, she received the Grand Nagamori Award from the Nagamori Foundation.

In 2022, O'Malley was recognized as one of 35 Women in Robotics Engineering and Science (WiRES) at the International Conference on Intelligent Robots and Systems (IROS) in Kyoto, Japan.
