= Danielle Dorris =

Canadian Paralympic swimmer (born 2002)

Personal information
- Nationality: Canadian
- Born: September 22, 2002 (age 23) Fredericton, New Brunswick
- Home town: Moncton, New Brunswick

Sport
- Sport: Paralympic swimming
- Disability class: S7, SB7, SM7
Medal record
Women's para swimming
Representing Canada
Event	1st	2nd	3rd
Paralympic Games	2	1	0
World Championships	4	3	2
Paralympic Games
Gold medal – first place	2020 Tokyo	50 m butterfly S7
Gold medal – first place	2024 Paris	50 m butterfly S7
Silver medal – second place	2020 Tokyo	100 m backstroke S7
World Championships
Gold medal – first place	2022 Madeira	50 m butterfly S7
Gold medal – first place	2023 Manchester	50 m butterfly S7
Gold medal – first place	2023 Manchester	100 m backstroke S7
Gold medal – first place	2025 Singapore	50 m butterfly S7
Silver medal – second place	2022 Madeira	100 m backstroke S7
Silver medal – second place	2023 Manchester	50 m freestyle S7
Silver medal – second place	2025 Singapore	100 m backstroke S7
Bronze medal – third place	2023 Manchester	200 m ind. medley SM7
Bronze medal – third place	2025 Singapore	50 m freestyle S7

Danielle Dorris (born September 22, 2002) is a Canadian Paralympic swimmer. She represented Canada at the 2016, 2020 and 2024 Summer Paralympics, winning back-to-back gold medals in the women's S7 50-metre butterfly in 2020 and 2024.

== Early life and education ==
Dorris was born with bilateral radial dysplasia to parents J.P. (Jean-Pierre) and Wanda. She has a sister, Roxanne. She attended Bernice MacNaughton High School in Moncton.

== Career ==
Dorris began competitive swimming in third grade. When she was 11, she was discovered by Swimming Canada’s para-swimming performance pathway coach, Janet Dunn. She began training with Ryan Allen in Moncton. She trained with the club de natation Bleu et Or (CNBO).

At age 13, Dorris was youngest Canadian swimmer ever to compete at a Paralympic Games in her Paralympic debut at the 2016 Summer Paralympics. Going into the Games, she was ranked 11th and held three national records. She placed fifth in the women's 4x100-metre medley 34 Points and also competed in the 100-metre butterfly S8 and 100-metre backstroke S8, but did not advance to the finals in those events.

Dorris was one of twelve recipients of the Senate of Canada's 2018 Sesquicentennial Medal in the province of New Brunswick, Canada. She received the award for her contributions to Paralympic Swimming and as a mentor to children with disabilities. The Sesquicentennial medals commemorate the 150th anniversary of the Senate of Canada's first sitting on November 6, 1857.

She won four medals at the 2018 Pan Pacific Para Swimming Championships in Cairns, Australia: a silver medal in the women's 100-metre backstroke S8 and bronze medals in the women's 100-metre butterfly S8, women's 200-metre individual medley S8, and as part of the women's 4x100-metre medley relay team. At the Pan Pacific Para Swimming Championships, she set Canadian records in the backstroke and butterfly with times of 1:23.59 and 1:18.20 respectively. Dorris made her World Para Swimming Championships debut in 2019.

Dorris represented Canada at the 2020 Summer Paralympics and won a silver medal in the 100 metre backstroke S7 event and a gold medal in the 50 metre butterfly S7 event. She set the world record in the S7 50-metre butterfly in the heats with a time of 33.51, then broke that record in the finals with a time of 32.99, becoming the first S7 swimmer ever to race the 50-metre butterfly in under 33 seconds. At the 2020 Paralympics, she also placed fourth in the 200-metre individual medley SM7, finishing five hundredths of a second behind the bronze medalist. In 2021 and 2023, Sport New Brunswick named Dorris the "Female Athlete of the Year", awarding her the Konika Minolta Sports Award.

She won gold in the women's S7 50-metre butterfly, her first gold at a World Championships with a championship-record time of 34.01 seconds, and silver in the S7 100-metre backstroke at the 2022 World Para Swimming Championships. At the 2023 World Para Swimming Championships in Manchester, England, she won gold in the women's S7 100-metre backstroke and S7 50-metre butterfly and bronze in the SM7 200 individual medley.

Dorris successfully defended her title in women's S7 50-metre butterfly at the 2024 Summer Paralympics, winning gold in 32.66 seconds. She remains the only woman to ever swim under 33 seconds in this event. Also at the 2024 Paralympics, she placed sixth in the women's 200 m individual medley SM7. She and para cyclist, Alexandre Hayward, were named New Brunswick’s Athletes of the Year, marking Dorris' third time winning the award in addition to being a finalist in 2019 and 2022.

She won bronze in the women's 50-metre freestyle S7, silver in the women’s 100-metre backstroke S7 and gold in the 50-metre butterfly S7 at the 2025 World Para Swimming Championships. By winning the 50-metre butterfly, Dorris became only the third Canadian to win three consecutive World Para Swimming Championship titles in the same event. She finished the race in a championship-record time of 33.93 seconds. Dorris competed at the Canadian short course swimming championships, where she broke three world records, racing 33.11 in the S7 50-metre butterfly, 35.20 in the S7 50-metre backstroke, and 1:22.57 in the SM7 100-metre individual medley.

Dorris has stated she plans to compete at the 2028 Paralympics.

== Personal life ==
Dorris moved back to Moncton in 2022, after living in Montreal.
