= Trevon Jenifer =

American wheelchair basketball player

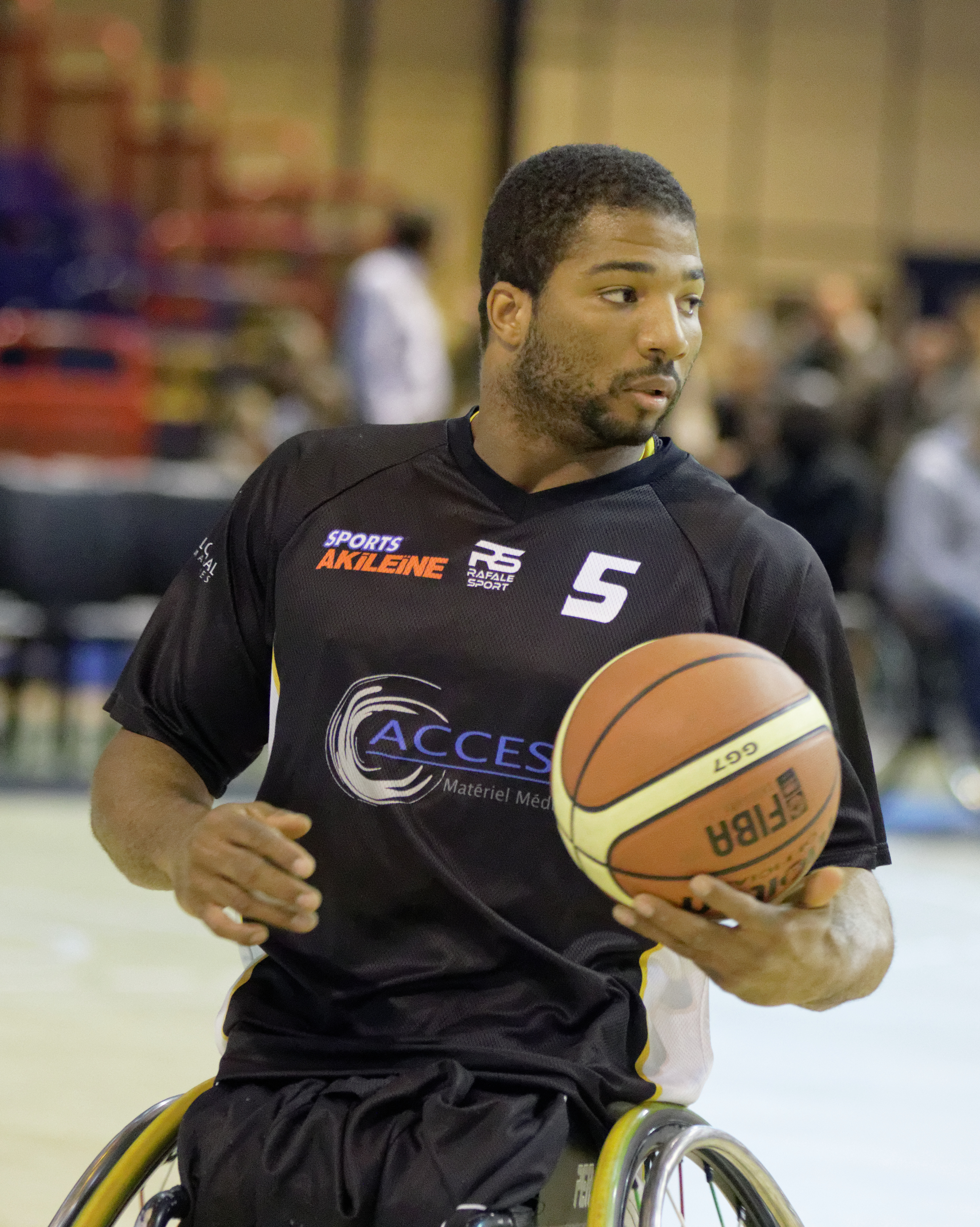
- Jenifer during the final of the French Cup in 2015

Personal information
- Full name: Trevon Edward Jenifer
- Nickname: Trey
- Born: September 7, 1988 (age 37) La Plata, Maryland, U.S.
- Height: 3 ft (91 cm)
Medal record
Men's wheelchair basketball
Representing United States
Paralympic Games
Gold medal – first place	2016 Rio	Team
Gold medal – first place	2020 Tokyo	Team
Gold medal – first place	2024 Paris	Team
Bronze medal – third place	2012 London	Team
World Championships
Gold medal – first place	2022 Dubai	Team
Silver medal – second place	2014 Incheon	Team
Parapan American Games
Gold medal – first place	2011 Guadalajara	Team
Gold medal – first place	2015 Toronto	Team
Gold medal – first place	2023 Santiago	Team
U23 World Championships
Gold medal – first place	2009 France	Team

Trevon Edward Jenifer (born September 7, 1988, in La Plata, Maryland) is an American Paralympic wheelchair basketball player.

== Career ==
In 1992, Jenifer participated in Wheelchair Track and Wheelchair Basketball with New Life Inc. He is an American record holder for the 100, 200, 400 and 800 meters in U11 and U14 age groups. He does several speaking engagements, motivational speeches, and demonstrations for kids, many organizations, etc. Jenifer has been a Keynote Speaker for the Americans with Disabilities Act, Horace Mann School, and many others. In 2006 he published his first book, From the Ground Up.

Jenifer works for the U.S Secret Service as a Personnel Security Specialist in the Security Management Division.

== Wheelchair basketball ==
=== Collegiate wheelchair basketball ===
In 2006-2011 Jenifer attended Edinboro University of Pennsylvania, where he played wheelchair basketball and graduated with a Bachelor of Arts from the Criminal Justice Degree. He was a Captain of the team from 2008 - 2011, a First Team All-American in 2010, Second Team All-American in 2011.

=== National team ===
In 2009 he made the U23 USA National Wheelchair Basketball Team. He helped his team win Gold at the World Cup in France and Silver at the BT Cup in London. In 2010 Jenifer made the USA Men's National Wheelchair Basketball Team. He helped his team win Gold at Pan American Games in Guadalajara, Mexico in 2011. He then helped his team win Bronze at the 2012 Paralympic Games in London, the first medal the Men's Wheelchair Basketball Team has won in 12 years. He was a member of the team that won the silver medal at the 2014 Incheon World Wheelchair Basketball Championship, losing to Australia in the finals. Jenifer competed in the 2016 Summer Paralympics and won a gold medal, the first in 28 years, with the U.S. Men's wheelchair basketball team.

=== Club wheelchair basketball ===
In 2011-2013 Jenifer played for Bay City, a local team based out of Erie, Pennsylvania. He helped his team finish 2nd in the Nation in Division 3 in 2011–2012 season, where he received First Team All-Tournament. In 2012–2013 season he helped his team finish 7th in the Nation in Division 2.

=== Professional wheelchair basketball ===
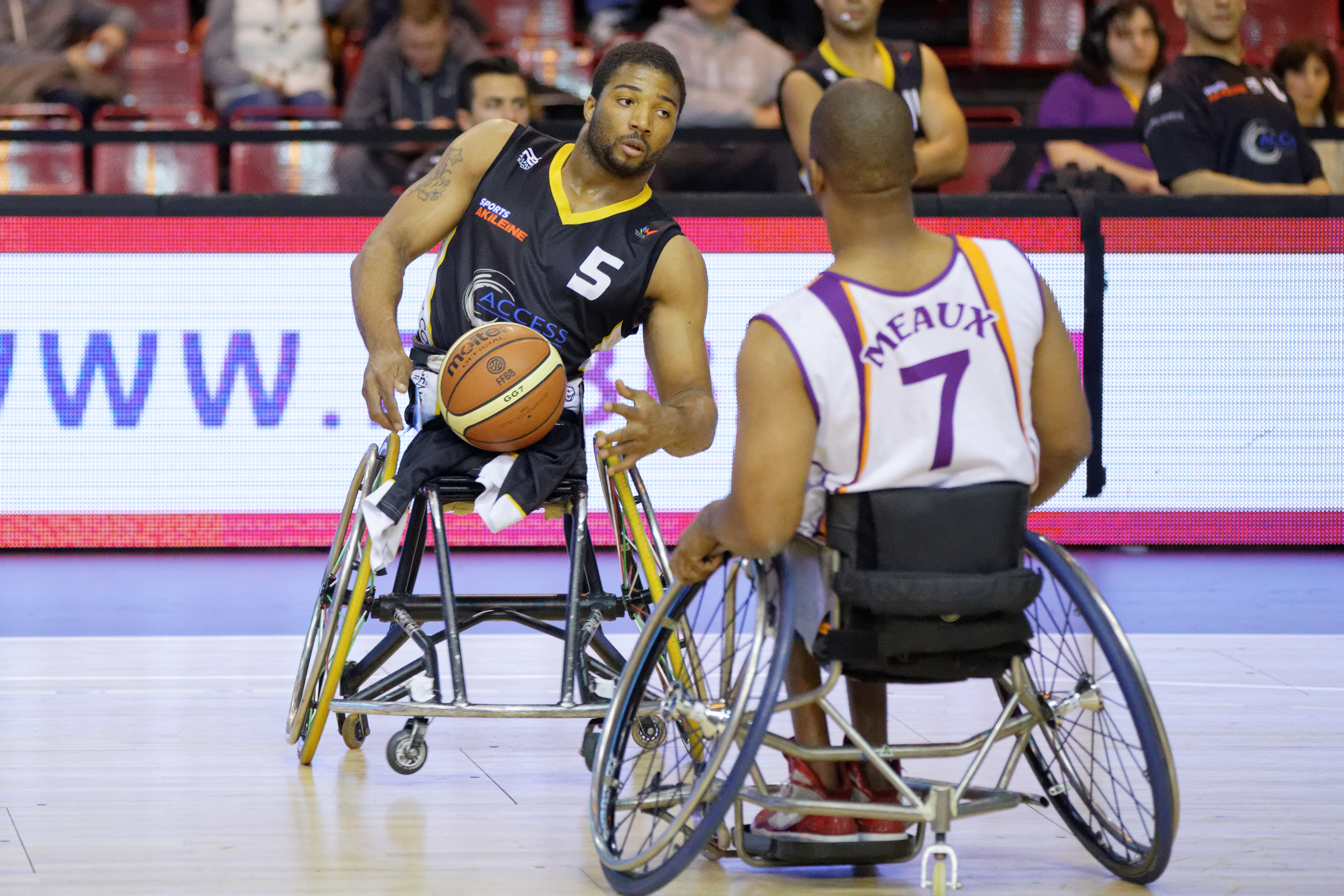
Jenifer at Le Cannet in 2015

In 2013-2014 Jenifer made his first appearance as a professional athlete. He played for Le Cannet in France, where he won All-Tournament in the first part of Euroleague and made the All-Star Team.

== Wrestling ==
In 2004-2006 he participated in wrestling at Huntingtown High School, weighing in at 103 pounds. His first year he finished 17-18 and 6th in SMAC (Southern Maryland Athletic Conference). His second year he finished with a record of 2-8 and 2nd in SMAC, 2nd in Regionals, and 3rd in the State of Maryland. In 2006 Jenifer was also inducted into the Wrestling Hall Of Fame for the Medal of Courage.

== Personal life ==
Jenifer was born missing both legs; consequently, he is 3 feet tall.
