= Ryan Neiswender =

American wheelchair basketball player

Personal information
- Nationality: American
- Born: May 11, 1994 (age 32) Lebanon, Pennsylvania, U.S.
- Height: 5 ft 1 in (1.55 m)

Sport
- Sport: Wheelchair basketball
- Disability: Arthrogryposis
- Disability class: 2.0
- Coached by: Ron Lykins
Medal record
Representing the United States
Men's wheelchair basketball
Paralympic Games
Gold medal – first place	2020 Tokyo	Team
World Championship
Gold medal – first place	2022 Dubai	Team
Parapan American Games
Gold medal – first place	2019 Lima	Team

Ryan Neiswender (born May 11, 1994) is an American wheelchair basketball player and a member of the United States men's national wheelchair basketball team. He represented the United States at the 2020 Summer Paralympics.

== Career ==
Neiswender represented the United States in wheelchair basketball at the 2020 Summer Paralympics and won a gold medal.

He represented the United States 2022 Wheelchair Basketball World Championships and won a gold medal.

== Personal life ==
Neiswender is employed by Visa.
