= Summer Schmit =

American paralympic swimmer (born 2003)

Personal information
- Born: August 8, 2003 (age 22) Saint Paul, Minnesota, U.S.
- Home town: Stillwater, Minnesota, U.S.

Sport
- Sport: Paralympic swimming
- Disability class: S9, SB9, SM9
- Club: Saint Croix Swim Club
Medal record
Women's paralympic swimming
Representing United States
World Championships
Bronze medal – third place	2022 Madeira	400 m freestyle S9
Parapan American Games
Silver medal – second place	2019 Lima	200 m ind. medley SM9
Bronze medal – third place	2019 Lima	100 m breaststroke SB9

Summer Schmit (born August 8, 2003) is an American Paralympic swimmer who represented the United States at the 2020 Summer Paralympics.

== Career ==
Schmit made her international debut for the United States at the 2019 Parapan American Games, where she won a silver medal in the 200 metre individual medley and a bronze medal in the 100 metre breaststroke SB9 event.

Schmit represented the United States at the 2020 Summer Paralympics where she finished in fifth place in the 200 metre individual medley SM9, sixth place in the 100 metre butterfly S9 and seventh place in the 400 metre freestyle S9 events.

On April 14, 2022, Schmit was named to the roster to represent the United States at the 2022 World Para Swimming Championships. On June 16, 2022, she won her first World Championships medal, a bronze medal in the 400 metre freestyle S9 event with a personal best time of 4:51.47.

== Personal life ==
Schmit was born with a congenital disarticulation of the right wrist and has no right hand.
