= Elizabeth Smith (swimmer) =

American Paralympic swimmer

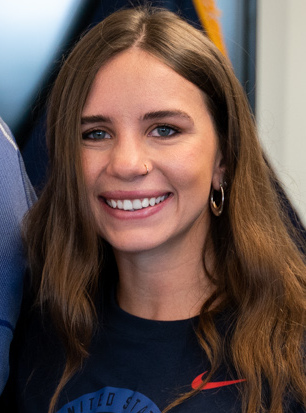

Personal information
- Nickname: Lizzi
- Born: 26 June 1996 (age 30) Muncie, Indiana, U.S.
- Height: 1.62 m (5 ft 4 in)
- Weight: 138 lb (63 kg)

Sport
- Country: United States
- Sport: Paralympic swimming
- Disability: Amniotic band syndrome
- Disability class: S9
- Club: Whitecaps of Westlake
- Coached by: Ian Crocker
Medal record
Paralympic swimming
Representing United States
Paralympic Games
Silver medal – second place	2016 Rio de Janeiro	4x100m freestyle relay 34pts
Silver medal – second place	2020 Tokyo	100 m butterfly S9
Bronze medal – third place	2016 Rio de Janeiro	4x100m medley relay 34pts
World Championships
Silver medal – second place	2019 London	4x100m freestyle relay 34pts
Silver medal – second place	2019 London	4x100m medley relay 34pts
Bronze medal – third place	2013 Montreal	100m backstroke S9
Bronze medal – third place	2013 Montreal	4x100m freestyle relay 34pts
Bronze medal – third place	2019 London	100m backstroke S9
Bronze medal – third place	2019 London	100m butterfly S9
Parapan American Games
Gold medal – first place	2019 Lima	50m freestyle S9
Gold medal – first place	2019 Lima	100m butterfly S9
Silver medal – second place	2019 Lima	100m backstroke S9

Elizabeth "Lizzi" Smith (born 26 June 1996) is an American Paralympic swimmer who competes in international level events. She was born without a left forearm due to amniotic band syndrome.

== Career ==
On April 14, 2022, Smith was named to the roster to represent the United States at the 2022 World Para Swimming Championships. On April 29, 2023, Smith was named to the roster to represent the United States at the 2023 World Para Swimming Championships.
