= Giulia Terzi =

Italian Paralympic swimmer (born 1995)

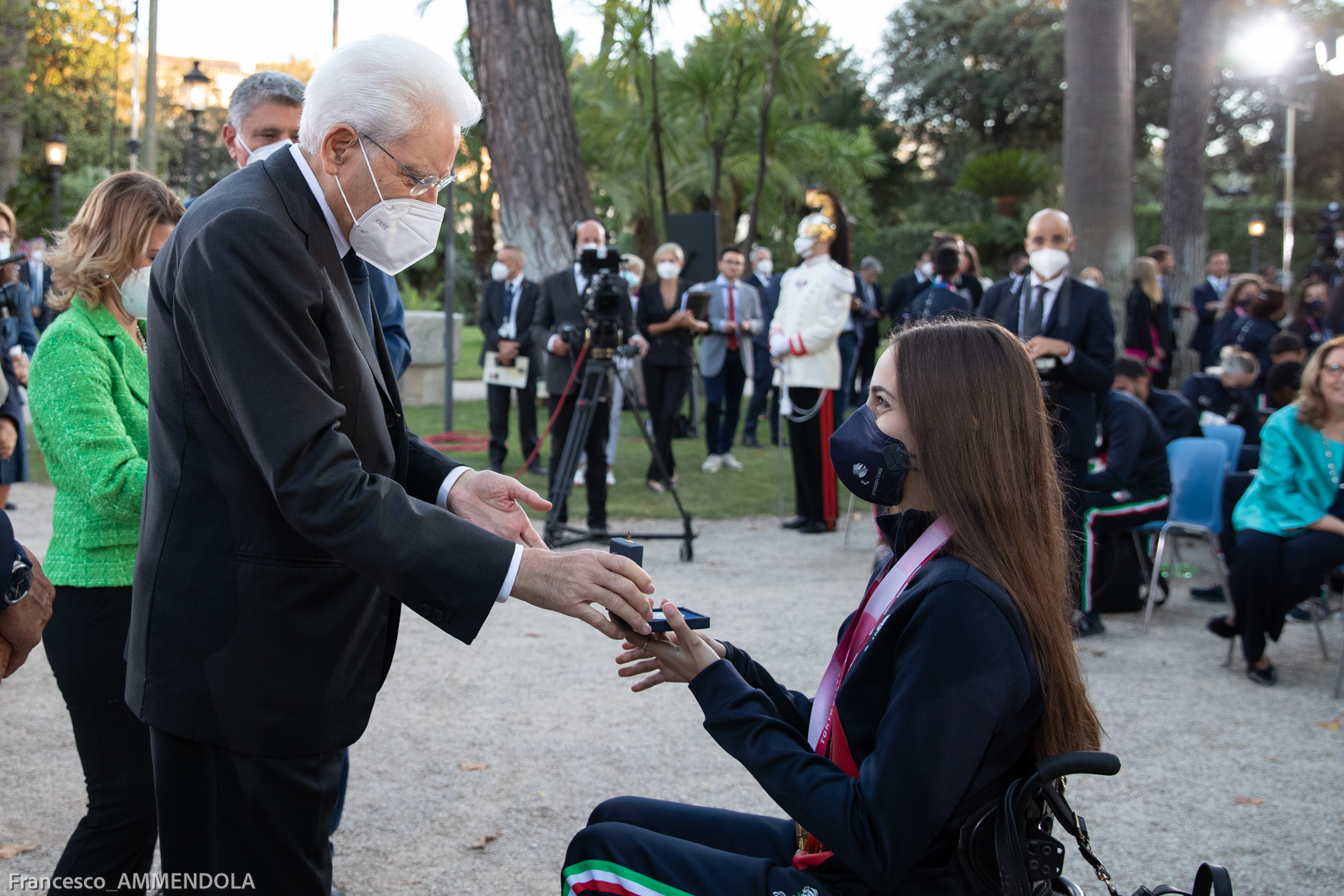
- Terzi awarded by the Italian President Sergio Mattarella at Quirinale Palace in 2021.

Personal information
- National team: Italy
- Born: 14 August 1995 (age 31) Milan, Italy
- Height: 1.76 m (5 ft 9 in)

Sport
- Sport: Paralympic swimming
- Disability: Scoliosis
- Disability class: S7
- Club: Polha Varese
- Coached by: Massimiliano Tosin; Micaela Biava
Medal record
Paralympic swimming
Representing Italy
Event	1st	2nd	3rd
Paralympics	3	2	4
World Championships	0	4	2
European Championships	9	2	1
Total	12	8	7
Paralympics Games
Gold medal – first place	2020 Tokyo	100 m freestyle S7
Gold medal – first place	2020 Tokyo	4×100 m freestyle
Gold medal – first place	2024 Paris	Mixed 4×100 m freestyle relay 34pts
Silver medal – second place	2020 Tokyo	Mixed 4×50m freestyle
Silver medal – second place	2020 Tokyo	400 m freestyle S7
Bronze medal – third place	2020 Tokyo	50m butterfly S7
Bronze medal – third place	2024 Paris	100 m freestyle S7
Bronze medal – third place	2024 Paris	400 m freestyle S7
Bronze medal – third place	2024 Paris	50m butterfly S7
World Championships
Silver medal – second place	2019 London	Women's 4x50m medley
Silver medal – second place	2022 Madeira	50m butterfly S7
Silver medal – second place	2022 Madeira	50m freestyle S7
Silver medal – second place	2022 Madeira	100m freestyle S7
Bronze medal – third place	2019 London	50m butterfly S7
Bronze medal – third place	2019 London	100m freestyle S7
European Championships
Gold medal – first place	2026 Kocaeli	100 m freestyle S6
Bronze medal – third place	2024 Madeira	100 m freestyle S7

Giulia Terzi (born 14 August 1995) is an Italian Paralympic swimmer who competes in international level events. She was diagnosed with congenital scoliosis aged four. She competed at the 2020 Summer Paralympics, in Women's 4 × 50 mixed freestyle relay, winning a silver medal, and in Women's 50 metre butterfly S7 winning a bronze medal.

== Career ==
Terzi was a former gymnast at a young age but switched to Paralympic swimming after her impairment worsened causing her to have problems with her left leg and arm. She won three medals at her international debut at the 2019 World Para Swimming Championships in London.
