= Camille Bérubé =

Canadian para swimmer

Personal information
- Born: 21 May 1995 (age 31) Gatineau, Quebec, Canada
- Height: 1.46 m (4 ft 9 in)

Sport
- Country: Canada
- Sport: Para swimming
- Disability: Neuroblastoma survivor
- Disability class: S7, SB6, SM7
Medal record
Para swimming
Representing Canada
World Championships
Bronze medal – third place	2022 Madeira	200 m medley SM7
Commonwealth Games
Bronze medal – third place	2022 Birmingham	100m breaststroke SB6
Parapan American Games
Silver medal – second place	2015 Toronto	100m backstroke S7
Bronze medal – third place	2015 Toronto	100m breaststroke SB7
Bronze medal – third place	2015 Toronto	200m medley SM7

Camille Bérubé (born 21 May 1995) is a Canadian para swimmer who competes in international elite swimming competitions. She is a three-time Parapan American Games medalist and has competed at the Paralympic Games three times.

== Career ==
Bérubé began swimming at age six. She raced raced her first World Para Swimming Championships competing for Canada at age 14. She made her Paralympic debut at the London 2012 Games. She placed eleventh in the 100m backstroke, 400m freestyle, and 200m individual medley.

At the 2013 World Championships, she broke the Canadian 100m backstroke record. Bérubé won a silver medal in the 100m backstroke and bronze medals in the 200m individual medley and 100m breaststroke at the 2015 Parapan American Games. She placed ninth in the 100m breaststroke at the 2016 Summer Paralympics, after qualifying last-minute when the Russian team was banned from the Games.

At the 2020 Summer Paralympics, Bérubé placed fifth in the 200m SM7 individual medley and made it to the finals in the 100m S7 backstroke and the 100m SB6 breaststroke.

At the 2022 World Para Swimming Championships in Madeira, Portugal, Bérubé placed third in the 200m SM7 individual medley. She placed third in the women’s SB6 100m breaststroke at the 2022 Commonwealth Games in Birmingham and made it to the finals of the women’s S8 100m backstroke, in which she placed fourth. Bérubé retired from swimming in 2022 after the Commonwealth Games.

== Personal life ==
Bérubé has limited use of her legs after she was diagnosed with cancer at birth, doctors removed a tumour in her lower back which caused the partial paralysis. She attended the University of Ottawa.
