= Morgan Stickney =

American Paralympic swimmer (born 1997)

Personal information
- Nationality: American
- Born: June 16, 1997 (age 29)

Sport
- Sport: Para swimming
- Disability class: S7
Medal record
Women's para swimming
Representing United States
Paralympic Games
Gold medal – first place	2020 Tokyo	400 m freestyle S8
Gold medal – first place	2020 Tokyo	4×100 m medley 34pts
Gold medal – first place	2024 Paris	400 m freestyle S7
Silver medal – second place	2024 Paris	100 m freestyle S7
World Championships
Gold medal – first place	2022 Madeira	400 m freestyle S8
Gold medal – first place	2023 Manchester	100 m freestyle S7
Gold medal – first place	2023 Manchester	400 m freestyle S7
Gold medal – first place	2025 Singapore	100 m freestyle S7
Gold medal – first place	2025 Singapore	400 m freestyle S7

Morgan Stickney (born June 16, 1997) is an American para swimmer who represented the United States at the 2020 and 2024 Summer Paralympics. She is a three-time Paralympic gold medalist and holds four para swimming world records.

== Early life and education ==
Stickney was raised in Bedford, New Hampshire, and emerged as a top-ranked distance swimmer by age 13. She enrolled at Biola University in 2016, and later earned a Bachelor of Science in Applied Psychology in 2023. She lives in Cary, North Carolina.

== Career ==
Stickney represented the United States at the 2020 Summer Paralympics in the women's 400 metre freestyle S8 event and won a gold medal. She also competed in the women's 4 × 100 m medley relay 34pts and won a gold medal.

On April 14, 2022, Stickney was named to the roster to represent the United States at the 2022 World Para Swimming Championships. On April 29, 2023, Stickney was named to the roster to represent the United States at the 2023 World Para Swimming Championships.

At the 2024 Summer Paralympics, Stickney won a gold medal in the 400-meter freestyle S7 event, setting a new Paralympic world record. She also won a silver medal in the 100-meter freestyle S7 event.

At the 2025 World Para Swimming Championships in Singapore, Stickney won two individual world titles, taking gold in the women's 400 m freestyle S7 (22 September) and the women's 100 m freestyle S7 (27 September).

== Personal life ==
As a teenager, Stickney suffered what initially appeared to be a routine foot injury. However, her condition deteriorated due to a rare vascular disease that compromised circulation and led to bone and tissue death. After years of pain and failed treatments, her left leg was amputated below the knee in May 2018. Just over a year later, in October 2019, Stickney underwent a second below-the-knee amputation, this time on her right leg.
