= Zsófia Konkoly =

Hungarian Paralympic swimmer

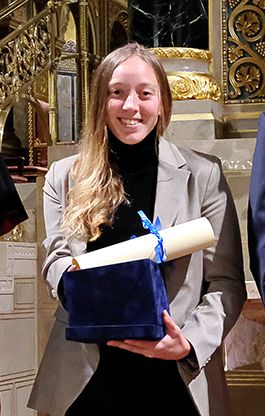
- Konkoly in 2022

Personal information
- Born: 12 March 2002 (age 24)

Sport
- Country: Hungary
- Sport: Paralympic swimming
Medal record
Women's para swimming
Representing Hungary
Paralympic Games
Gold medal – first place	2020 Tokyo	100 m butterfly S9
Gold medal – first place	2024 Paris	400 m freestyle S9
Gold medal – first place	2024 Paris	200 m medley SM9
Silver medal – second place	2020 Tokyo	400 m freestyle S9
Silver medal – second place	2020 Tokyo	200 m medley SM9
Silver medal – second place	2024 Paris	100 m butterfly S9
Bronze medal – third place	2016 Rio de Janeiro	100 m butterfly S9
World Championships
Gold medal – first place	2022 Madeira	100 m butterfly S9
Gold medal – first place	2022 Madeira	200 m medley SM9
Gold medal – first place	2023 Manchester	200 m medley SM9
Silver medal – second place	2022 Madeira	400 m freestyle S9
Silver medal – second place	2023 Manchester	100 m butterfly S9
Silver medal – second place	2025 Singapore	100 m butterfly S9
Bronze medal – third place	2025 Singapore	200 m medley SM9
Bronze medal – third place	2025 Singapore	400 m freestyle S9
European Championships
Gold medal – first place	2026 Kocaeli	100 m butterfly S9
Silver medal – second place	2026 Kocaeli	100 m backstroke S9
Bronze medal – third place	2016 Funchal	400 m freestyle S9
Bronze medal – third place	2016 Funchal	100 m backstroke S9
Bronze medal – third place	2018 Dublin	400 m freestyle S9
Bronze medal – third place	2026 Kocaeli	200 m ind. medley SM9

Zsófia Konkoly (born 12 March 2002) is a Hungarian Paralympic swimmer.

== Career ==
She represented Hungary at the 2016 Summer Paralympics and won a bronze medal in the 100 metre butterfly S9 event. At the 2020 Summer Paralympics, she won a silver medal in the 400 metre freestyle S9 event. In September 2016, she received the Hungarian Bronze Cross of Merit.

She won two gold medals and a silver medal at the 2022 World Para Swimming Championships held in Madeira.
