= Nate Hinze =

American wheelchair basketball player

Nathan Hinze
Personal information
- Born: June 12, 1988 (age 38) Sheboygan, Wisconsin, U.S.
- Listed height: 6 ft 2 in (188 cm)
- Listed weight: 225 lb (102 kg)

Career information
- High school: Cedar Grove-Belgium High School
Medals
Men's wheelchair basketball
Representing United States
Paralympic Games
Bronze medal – third place	2012 London	Team
Gold medal – first place	2020 Tokyo	Team
Gold medal – first place	2024 Paris	Team
Parapan American Games
Gold medal – first place	2011 Guadalajara	Team
World Championship
Bronze medal – third place	2010 Birmingham	Team

Nathan Hinze (born June 12, 1988) is an American Paralympic wheelchair basketball player from Sheboygan, Wisconsin. He is a three-time Intercollegiate Wheelchair Basketball Champion and is 2010 IWBF World Championship bronze medalist. A year later, he was awarded a gold medal at the 2011 Parapan American Games and on 2012 Summer Paralympics he was awarded with another bronze medal. Besides playing sports, he also likes to watch them with his favorite teams being the Green Bay Packers, Milwaukee Brewers and Wisconsin Badgers. He also likes to play videogames and jet ski. Currently he lives in Cedar Grove, Wisconsin and is a fan of Green Bay Packers and Michael Jordan.

Hinze was born to Ron and Patti Hinez and has two siblings, his sister Melissa and his brother Chad.

When Hinze was 16 years old, he was diagnosed with an Osteosarcoma in his leg. He underwent nine months of chemotherapy and a surgery to replace the affected bones in his leg with titanium. He attended the University of Wisconsin–Whitewater from the years 2006 to 2011 and graduated with a Bachelor of Science and later graduated from the University of Wisconsin–Oshkosh with a master's degree in educational leadership.

Hinze married his wife, Ashley Martin in 2013. They have three children together.

Hinze was an assistant principal for Port Washington High School from the years 2020 to 2024. He is currently the principal at Kohler Elementary School in Kohler, Wisconsin.
