= Ahalya Lettenberger =

American Paralympic swimmer

Personal information
- Nationality: American
- Born: March 19, 2001 (age 25) Chicago, Illinois, U.S.
- Home town: Glen Ellyn, Illinois, U.S.

Sport
- Sport: Para swimming
- Disability: Arthrogryposis
- Disability class: S7, SM7, SB6
- Event: 400 meter freestyle
- Club: Rice University
- Coached by: Seth Huston
Medal record
Representing United States
Women's para swimming
Paralympic Games
Silver medal – second place	2020 Tokyo	200 m ind. medley SM7
World Championships
Silver medal – second place	2019 London	400 m freestyle S7
Silver medal – second place	2023 Manchester	400 m freestyle S7
Bronze medal – third place	2022 Madeira	400 m freestyle S7
Bronze medal – third place	2025 Singapore	400 m freestyle S7
Parapan American Games
Gold medal – first place	2015 Toronto	100 m backstroke S8
Women's paratriathlon
Americas Championships
Gold medal – first place	2018 Sarasota-Bradenton	PTWC

Ahalya Lettenberger (born March 19, 2001) is an American para swimmer who represented the United States at the 2020 and 2024 Summer Paralympics.

== Career ==
Lettenberger represented the United States at the 2020 Summer Paralympics in the 200 metre individual medley event and won a silver medal.

On April 14, 2022, Lettenberger was named to the roster to represent the United States at the 2022 World Para Swimming Championships. On April 29, 2023, Lettenberger was named to the roster to represent the United States at the 2023 World Para Swimming Championships.

== Personal life ==
Ahalya was born with arthrogryposis, which causes muscle weakness and joint restriction in the lower limbs. She graduated from Rice University in 2023 with her Bachelor of Science in bioengineering, where she conducted undergraduate research with Dr. Marcia O'Malley at the Mechatronics and Haptics Interfaces (MAHI) Lab. On December 11, 2023, Lettenberger was named a 2024 recipient of the Marshall Scholarship.
