= Hannah Aspden =

American Paralympic swimmer (born 2000)

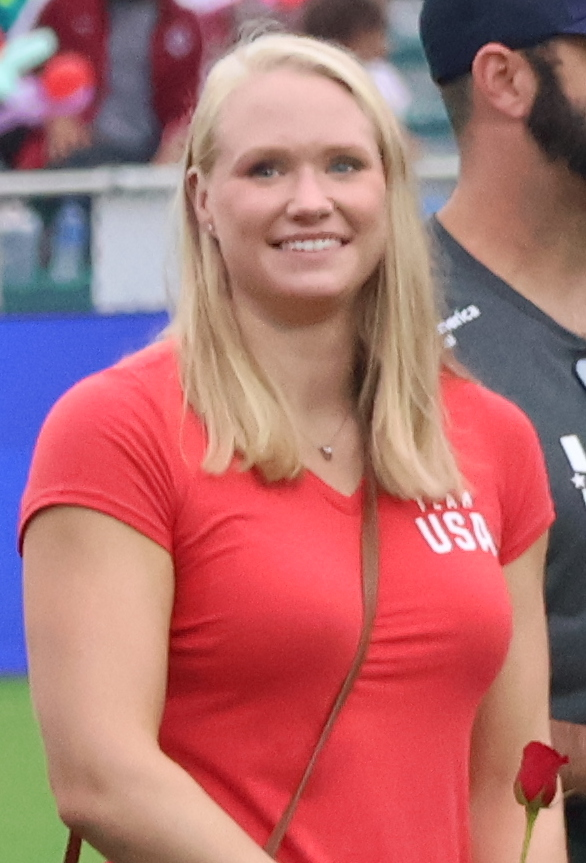
- Aspden in 2024

Personal information
- Full name: Hannah Elizabeth Aspden
- Born: June 11, 2000 (age 26) Raleigh, North Carolina, U.S.

Sport
- Sport: Paralympic swimming
- Disability class: S9
Medal record
Women's paralympic swimming
Representing United States
Paralympic Games
| Gold medal – first place | 2020 Tokyo | 100 m backstroke S9 |
| Gold medal – first place | 2020 Tokyo | 4×100 m medley 34pts |
| Bronze medal – third place | 2016 Rio de Janeiro | 100 m backstroke S9 |
World Championships
| Silver medal – second place | 2022 Madeira | 100 m backstroke S9 |

Hannah Elizabeth Aspden (born June 11, 2000) is an American Paralympic swimmer. She was the youngest swimmer on Team USA to medal at either the Olympics or Paralympics in 2016. During the 2019–20 season at Queens University of Charlotte, Aspden broke two American Paralympic Short Course Meters Swimming records in both the 100-Meter Backstroke and the 100-Meter Freestyle.

== Early life ==
Aspden was born to mother Jennifer Aspden in Raleigh, North Carolina, without her left leg. She learned to swim at the age of four because she wanted to enter the deep end of the pool at the local YMCA. By the age of 10, she competed in her first swim meet where she met retired Paralympic swimmer Elizabeth Stone. Two years later, Aspden was named to the US Emerging Team roster and became the youngest member on Team USAs National roster at the age of 13.

Aspden attended Quest Academy Charter School for grades 7 and 8 before attending Leesville Road High School.

== Career ==
Aspden qualified for Team USAs roster, where she would compete in the S9/SB8/SM9 classifications, in 2014 by a margin of .01 seconds. As a result, she made her national team debut at the 2014 Pan Pacific Swimming Championships and swam a time of 30.47.

Aspden made her Paralympic debut at the 2016 Summer Paralympics, where she became the youngest swimmer on Team USA to medal at either the Olympics or Paralympics in 2016. Aspden earned a bronze medal in the 100-meter backstroke and another third-place finish in the 4x100-meter medley. The following year, she was named to Team USAs 2017 World Championships Team, and committed to attend Queens University of Charlotte.

At the 2018 Pan Pacific Para Swimming Championships, Aspden won a silver medal in the 4x100 medley. The following year, Aspden earned a gold medal at the S9 women's 100 back sweep and 400 freestyle at the 2019 Parapan American Games. During the school year, Aspden competed in six swim meets and broke two American Paralympic Short Course Meters Swimming records for the 100-Meter Backstroke and 100-Meter Freestyle.

On April 14, 2022, Aspden was named to the roster to represent the United States at the 2022 World Para Swimming Championships. On April 29, 2023, Aspden was named to the roster to represent the United States at the 2023 World Para Swimming Championships.

== Personal life ==
She has two siblings, a brother and a sister. Her best kind of music is classic rock.
