= United States at the 2019 Parapan American Games =

- IPC code: USA
- NPC: United States Paralympic Committee

in Lima, Peru
- Competitors: 257 in 16 sports
- Flag bearers: Kathryn Holloway (Opening); Rose Hollermann (Closing)
- Medals Ranked 2nd: Gold 50 Silver 44 Bronze 43 Total 137

Parapan American Games appearances (overview)
- 1999; 2003; 2007; 2011; 2015; 2019; 2023

United States competed at the 2019 Parapan American Games in Lima, Peru.

== Medalists ==
Medal	Name	Sport	Event
Gold	Gianfranco Iannotta	Athletics	Men's 100m T52
Gold	Kevan Hueftle	Athletics	Men's 100m T64
Gold	David Prince	Athletics	Men's 200m T64
Gold	Isaiah Rigo	Athletics	Men's 400m T52
Gold	Isaiah Rigo	Athletics	Men's 1500m T52
Gold	Sam Grewe	Athletics	Men's high jump T42-47/T63-64
Gold	Claudius Fawehinmi	Athletics	Men's long jump T47
Gold	Trenten Merrill	Athletics	Men's long jump T63/64
Gold	Hagan Landry	Athletics	Men's shot put F40/41
Gold	Joshua Cinnamo	Athletics	Men's shot put F46
Gold	Justin Phongsavanh	Athletics	Men's javelin throw F54
Gold	Kym Crosby	Athletics	Women's 100m T13
Gold	Jaleen Roberts	Athletics	Women's 100m T37
Gold	Deja Young	Athletics	Women's 100m T47
Gold	Hannah Dederick	Athletics	Women's 100m T54
Gold	Jaleen Roberts	Athletics	Women's 200m T37
Gold	Deja Young	Athletics	Women's 200m T47
Gold	Sydney Barta	Athletics	Women's 200m T64
Gold	Breanna Clark	Athletics	Women's 400m T20
Gold	Hannah Dederick	Athletics	Women's 400m T54
Gold	Yen Hoang	Athletics	Women's 800m T53
Gold	Jenna Fesemyer	Athletics	Women's 800m T54
Gold	Jaleen Roberts	Athletics	Women's long jump T36/37/38
Gold	Scout Bassett	Athletics	Women's long jump T42-44/T61-63
Gold	Jessica Heims	Athletics	Women's discus throw F64
Gold	Erik Hightower; Noah Malone; Jaleen Roberts; Deja Young	Athletics	Universal 4x100m relay
Gold	Clara Brown	Cycling	Women's road race C1-3
Gold	Clara Brown	Cycling	Women's time trial C1-5
Gold	Jill Walsh	Cycling	Mixed time trial T1-2
Gold	Joseph Berenyi	Cycling	Men's 1km time trial
Gold	Samantha Bosco	Cycling	Women's 500m time trial
Gold	Clara Brown	Cycling	Women's individual pursuit C1-3
Gold	Samantha Bosco	Cycling	Women's individual pursuit C4-5
Gold	Michael Tagliapietra	Shooting	Mixed 25m pistol SH1 P3
Gold	Kevin Nguyen	Shooting	Mixed 50m pistol SH1 P4
Gold	Taylor Farmer	Shooting	Mixed 10m air rifle prone SH1 R3
Gold	Stetson Bardfield	Shooting	Mixed 10m air rifle standing SH2 R4
Gold	McKenna Dahl	Shooting	Mixed 10m air rifle prone SH2
Gold	Women's team	Sitting volleyball	Women's tournament
Gold	Matthew Torres	Swimming	Men's 400m freestyle S9
Gold	Matthew Torres	Swimming	Men's 100m backstroke S8
Gold	Tye Dutcher	Swimming	Men's 100m backstroke S10
Gold	Carson Sanocki	Swimming	Men's 100m breaststroke SB13
Gold	Carson Sanocki	Swimming	Men's 200m individual medley SM13
Gold	Elizabeth Smith	Swimming	Women's 50m freestyle S9
Gold	Natalie Sims	Swimming	Women's 100m freestyle S9
Gold	Hannah Aspden	Swimming	Women's 400m freestyle S9
Gold	Alyssia Gialamas	Swimming	Women's 50m backstroke S5
Gold	Abigail Gase	Swimming	Women's 100m backstroke S7
Gold	Hannah Aspden	Swimming	Women's 100m backstroke S9
Gold	Madelyn White	Swimming	Women's 100m breaststroke SB8
Gold	Elizabeth Smith	Swimming	Women's 100m butterfly S9
Gold	Laurrie Hermes; Ross Minor; Carson Sanocki; Aspen Shelton	Swimming	Mixed 4x100m freestyle relay
Gold	Tahl Leibovitz	Table tennis	Men's singles C9
Gold	Evan Medell	Taekwondo	Men's +75kg
Gold	Men's team	Wheelchair basketball	Men's tournament
Gold	Mixed team	Wheelchair rugby	Mixed tournament
Gold	Emmy Kaiser; Dana Mathewson	Wheelchair tennis	Women's doubles
Silver	Noah Malone	Athletics	Men's 100m T12
Silver	Isaiah Rigo	Athletics	Men's 100m T52
Silver	Erik Hightower	Athletics	Men's 100m T54
Silver	Jerome Singleton	Athletics	Men's 100m T64
Silver	Marshall Zackery	Athletics	Men's 200m T35
Silver	Kevan Hueftle	Athletics	Men's 200m T64
Silver	Markeith Price	Athletics	Men's 400m T13
Silver	Phillip Croft	Athletics	Men's 400m T53
Silver	Erik Hightower	Athletics	Men's 400m T54
Silver	Phillip Croft	Athletics	Men's 800m T53
Silver	Joel Gomez	Athletics	Men's 1500m T13
Silver	Ezra Frech	Athletics	Men's high jump T42-47/T63-64
Silver	Elexis Gillette	Athletics	Men's long jump T11/12
Silver	Tanner Wright	Athletics	Men's long jump T47
Silver	Ezra Frech	Athletics	Men's long jump T63/64
Silver	Scot Severn	Athletics	Men's shot put F53/54
Silver	Jeremy Campbell	Athletics	Men's discus throw F64
Silver	Kelsey Le Fervour	Athletics	Women's 100m T53
Silver	Beatriz Hatz	Athletics	Women's 100m T64
Silver	Beatriz Hatz	Athletics	Women's 200m T64
Silver	Yen Hoang	Athletics	Women's 400m T53
Silver	Jenna Fesemyer	Athletics	Women's 400m T54
Silver	Hannah Dederick	Athletics	Women's 800m T54
Silver	Taleah Williams	Athletics	Women's long jump T47
Silver	Lacey Henderson	Athletics	Women's long jump T42-44/T61-63
Silver	Sebastiana Lopez Arellano	Athletics	Women's javelin throw F54
Silver	Miles Krajewski	Badminton	Men's singles SS6
Silver	Brandon Lyons	Cycling	Men's road race H3-5
Silver	Matthew Rodriguez	Cycling	Mixed road race T1-2
Silver	Brandon Lyons	Cycling	Mixed time trial H1-5
Silver	Matthew Rodriguez	Cycling	Mixed time trial T1-2
Silver	Christopher Murphy	Cycling	Men's 1km time trial
Silver	Joseph Berenyi	Cycling	Men's individual pursuit C1-3
Silver	John Kusku; Tyler Merren; Matthew Simpson; Daryl Walker; Joshua Welborn; Calahan Young	Goalball	Men's team
Silver	Lisa Czechowski; Amanda Dennis; Marybai Huking; Alexandra Lawson; Shavon Lockhardt; Eliana Mason	Goalball	Women's team
Silver	Benjamin Goodrich	Judo	Men's +100kg
Silver	Ahmed Shafik	Powerlifting	Men's 88-97kg combined
Silver	McKenna Dahl	Shooting	Mixed 10m air rifle standing SH2
Silver	Men's team	Sitting volleyball	Men's tournament
Silver	Jamal Hill	Swimming	Men's 50m freestyle S11
Silver	Carson Sanocki	Swimming	Men's 400m freestyle S13
Silver	Joseph Peppersack	Swimming	Men's 100m backstroke S8
Silver	Liam Smith	Swimming	Men's 100m breaststroke SB7
Silver	Alyssa Gialamas	Swimming	Women's 200m freestyle S5
Silver	Madelyn White	Swimming	Women's 400m freestyle S9
Silver	Laurrie Hermes	Swimming	Women's 400m freestyle S11
Silver	Elizabeth Smith	Swimming	Women's 100m backstroke S9
Silver	Aspen Shelton	Swimming	Women's 100m backstroke S12
Silver	Haven Shepherd	Swimming	Women's 100m breaststroke SB7
Silver	Samantha Tubbs	Swimming	Women's 100m breaststroke SB9
Silver	Leslie Cichocki	Swimming	Women's 100m butterfly S14
Silver	Haven Shepherd	Swimming	Women's 200m individual medley SM8
Silver	Summer Schmit	Swimming	Women's 200m individual medley SM9
Silver	Hannah Aspden; Abigail Gase; Elise Morley; Natalie Sims	Swimming	Women's 4x100m freestyle relay
Silver	Jenson van Emburgh	Table tennis	Men's singles C3
Silver	Ahad Sarand	Table tennis	Men's singles C5
Silver	Ian Seidenfeld	Table tennis	Men's singles C6
Silver	Marco Makkar; Ian Seidenfeld	Table tennis	Men's team C6-8
Silver	Women's team	Wheelchair basketball	Women's tournament
Silver	Christopher Herman; Casey Ratzlaff	Wheelchair tennis	Men's doubles
Silver	David Wagner	Wheelchair tennis	Quads' singles
Bronze	David Brown	Athletics	Men's 100m T11
Bronze	Marshall Zackery	Athletics	Men's 100m T35
Bronze	Nicholas Rogers	Athletics	Men's 100m T64
Bronze	Jerome Singleton	Athletics	Men's 200m T64
Bronze	Gianfranco Iannotta	Athletics	Men's 400m T52
Bronze	Cody Jones	Athletics	Men's javelin throw F37/38
Bronze	Catherine Carey	Athletics	Women's 100m T64
Bronze	Catarina Guimarães	Athletics	Women's 400m T38
Bronze	Kelsey Le Fervour	Athletics	Women's 400m T53
Bronze	Elizabeth Floch	Athletics	Women's 400m T54
Bronze	Arielle Rausin	Athletics	Women's 800m T54
Bronze	Catarina Guimarães	Athletics	Women's long jump T36/37/38
Bronze	Catherine Carey	Athletics	Women's long jump T42-44/T61-63
Bronze	Sebastiana Lopez Arellano	Athletics	Women's shot put F53/54/55
Bronze	Sydney Barta	Athletics	Women's discus throw F64
Bronze	Joseph Berenyi	Cycling	Men's road race C1-3
Bronze	Samantha Bosco	Cycling	Women's road race C4-5
Bronze	Samantha Bosco	Cycling	Women's time trial C1-5
Bronze	Jason Kimball	Cycling	Men's individual pursuit C1-3
Bronze	Clara Brown	Cycling	Women's 500m time trial C1-5
Bronze	Men's team	Football 7-a-side	Men's team
Bronze	Ron Hawthrone	Judo	Men's -60kg
Bronze	Richard Ties	Judo	Men's -90kg
Bronze	Christella Garcia	Judo	Women's -70kg
Bronze	Katie Davis	Judo	Women's +70kg
Bronze	Michael Tagliapietra	Shooting	Men's 10m air pistol SH1 P1
Bronze	Robert Beach	Shooting	Mixed 50m pistol SH1
Bronze	Kevin Nguyen	Shooting	Mixed 10m air rifle prone SH1 R3
Bronze	Liam Smith	Swimming	Men's 50m freestyle S7
Bronze	Tye Dutcher	Swimming	Men's 50m freestyle S10
Bronze	Liam Smith	Swimming	Men's 100m freestyle S7
Bronze	Matthew Torres	Swimming	Men's 100m freestyle S8
Bronze	Carson Sanocki	Swimming	Men's 100m freestyle S13
Bronze	Ross Minor	Swimming	Men's 400m freestyle S11
Bronze	Sam Murray	Swimming	Men's 100m breaststroke SB8
Bronze	Zachary Shattuck	Swimming	Men's 50m butterfly S6
Bronze	Liam Smith	Swimming	Men's 50m butterfly S7
Bronze	Tye Dutcher	Swimming	Men's 100m butterfly S10
Bronze	Zachary Shattuck	Swimming	Men's 200m individual medley SM6
Bronze	Matthew Torres	Swimming	Men's 200m individual medley SM8
Bronze	David Gelfand	Swimming	Men's 200m individual medley SM9
Bronze	David Gelfand; Jamal Hill; Liam Smith; Matthew Torres	Swimming	Men's 4x100m freestyle relay
Bronze	Tye Dutcher; Jamal Hill; Zachary Shattuck; Matthew Torres	Swimming	Men's 4x100m medley relay
Bronze	Abigail Gase	Swimming	Women's 50m freestyle S7
Bronze	Haven Shepherd	Swimming	Women's 50m freestyle S8
Bronze	Elise Morley	Swimming	Women's 50m freestyle S9
Bronze	Hannah Aspden	Swimming	Women's 100m freestyle S9
Bronze	Aspen Shelton	Swimming	Women's 100m freestyle S12
Bronze	Alyssia Crook	Swimming	Women's 400m freestyle S9
Bronze	Amanda Palyo	Swimming	Women's 100m backstroke S9
Bronze	Laurrie Hermes	Swimming	Women's 100m backstroke S11
Bronze	Leslie Cichocki	Swimming	Women's 100m backstroke S14
Bronze	Abigail Nardella	Swimming	Women's 100m breaststroke SB6
Bronze	Hannah Aspden	Swimming	Women's 100m breaststroke SB8
Bronze	Summer Schmit	Swimming	Women's 100m breaststroke SB9
Bronze	Laurrie Hermes	Swimming	Women's 100m breaststroke SB11
Bronze	Abigail Gase	Swimming	Women's 50m butterfly S7
Bronze	Natalie Sims	Swimming	Women's 100m butterfly S9
Bronze	Abigail Gase	Swimming	Women's 200m individual medley SM7
Bronze	Natalie Sims	Swimming	Women's 200m individual medley SM9
Bronze	Tahl Leibovitz; Randall Medcalf; Jerry Vasquez	Table tennis	Men's team C9-10
Bronze	Johnny Birch	Taekwondo	Men's +75kg
Bronze	Sophie Gimeno	Taekwondo	Women's -49kg
Bronze	Dana Mathewson	Wheelchair tennis	Women's singles
Bronze	Bryan Barten	Wheelchair tennis	Quads' singles

== Athletics ==
Sixty athletes and four guides represented the United States at the 2019 Parapan American Games.

=== Men's track ===
Athlete	Event	Heats		Final	
Athlete	Event	Result	Rank	Result	Rank
Jackson Atwood	100m T54	—N/a		16.33	6
Jackson Atwood	400m T54	—N/a		56.11	8
Jackson Atwood	1500m T54	—N/a		3:28.59	8
Stephen Binning	100m T53	—N/a		16.60	5
Stephen Binning	400m T53	—N/a		DQ	
Mark Braun	100m T54	—N/a		15.50	4
Mark Braun	400m T54	—N/a		54.45	7
Jack Briggs	100m T47	11.38	6 q	11.49	7
David Brown	100m T11	11.47	2 Q	11.39	3rd place, bronze medalist(s)
David Brown	400m T11	56.42	5	did not advance	
Christian Clemmons	800m T54	—N/a		1:46.78	4
Christian Clemmons	1500m T54	—N/a		3:26.13	5
Antoine Craig	100m T11	11.76	6	did not advance	
Phillip Croft	100m T53	—N/a		16.68	7
Phillip Croft	400m T53	—N/a		55.52	2nd place, silver medalist(s)
Phillip Croft	800m T53	—N/a		1:53.64	2nd place, silver medalist(s)
Phillip Croft	1500m T54	—N/a		3:27.89	6
Phillip Croft	5000m T54	—N/a		12:34.75	4
Casey Followay	100m T53	—N/a		16.58	4
Ezra Frech	100m T64	—N/a		13.82	7
Joel Gomez	1500m T13	—N/a		4:03.22	2nd place, silver medalist(s)
Erik Hightower	100m T54	—N/a		14.90	2nd place, silver medalist(s)
Erik Hightower	400m T54	—N/a		51.14	2nd place, silver medalist(s)
Kevan Hueftle	100m T64	—N/a		11.45	1st place, gold medalist(s)
Kevan Hueftle	200m T64	—N/a		23.21	2nd place, silver medalist(s)
Gianfranco Iannotta	100m T52	—N/a		17.82	1st place, gold medalist(s)
Gianfranco Iannotta	400m T52	—N/a		1:06.19	3rd place, bronze medalist(s)
Noah Malone	100m T12	11.04	=1 Q	11.12	2nd place, silver medalist(s)
Conner Pierce	100m T36	13.66	6 Q	13.73	7
Conner Pierce	400m T36	—N/a		DQ	
Markeith Price	400m T13	—N/a		51.34	2nd place, silver medalist(s)
David Prince	200m T64	—N/a		22.73	1st place, gold medalist(s)
Isaiah Rigo	100m T52	—N/a		17.89	2nd place, silver medalist(s)
Isaiah Rigo	400m T52	—N/a		1:04.00	1st place, gold medalist(s)
Nicholas Rogers	100m T64	—N/a		11.63	3rd place, bronze medalist(s)
Noah Scherf	5000m T13	—N/a		15:44.48	4
Jerome Singleton	100m T64	—N/a		11.62	2nd place, silver medalist(s)
Jerome Singleton	200m T64	—N/a		24.04	3rd place, bronze medalist(s)
Tanner Wright	100m T47	11.22	3 Q	11.32	5
Tanner Wright	400m T47	DQ		did not advance	
Marshall Zackery	100m T35	—N/a		13.06	3rd place, bronze medalist(s)
Marshall Zackery	200m T35	—N/a		26.64	2nd place, silver medalist(s)

=== Men's field ===
Athlete	Class	Event	Final		
Athlete	Class	Event	Result	Points	Rank
Jeremy Campbell	F64	Discus throw F64	62.92 PR	-	2nd place, silver medalist(s)
Joshua Cinnamo	F46	Shot put F46	16.49 WR	-	1st place, gold medalist(s)
Tobi Fawehinmi	T46	Long jump T47	7.03	-	1st place, gold medalist(s)
Ezra Frech	T63	High jump T42-47/T63-64	1.74	777	2nd place, silver medalist(s)
Ezra Frech	T63	Long jump T63-64	5.43	573	2nd place, silver medalist(s)
Michael Gallardo	F64	Javelin throw F64	51.31	-	6
Elexis Gillette	T11	Long jump T11-12	6.12	831	2nd place, silver medalist(s)
Sam Grewe	T63	High jump T42-47/T63-64	1.90 WR	989	1st place, gold medalist(s)
Cody Jones	F38	Javelin throw F37/38	44.92	816	3rd place, bronze medalist(s)
Hagan Landry	F41	Shot put F40/41	12.58	920	1st place, gold medalist(s)
Trenten Merrill	T64	Long jump T63-64	6.94	905	1st place, gold medalist(s)
Justin Phongsavanh	F54	Javelin throw F54	30.56 PR	-	1st place, gold medalist(s)
Markeith Price	T13	Long jump T13	6.29	-	3
Scot Severn	F53	Shot put F53/54	7.92	867	2nd place, silver medalist(s)
Tanner Wright	T46	Long jump T47	6.45	-	2nd place, silver medalist(s)

=== Women's track ===
Athlete	Event	Heats		Final	
Athlete	Event	Result	Rank	Result	Rank
Femita Ayanbeku	100m T64	—N/a		DNS	
Femita Ayanbeku	200m T64	—N/a		29.45	4
Sydney Barta	200m T64	—N/a		28.09 PR	1st place, gold medalist(s)
Kaitlin Bounds	400m T20	—N/a		1:11.12	8
Catherine Carey	100m T64	—N/a		14.07	3rd place, bronze medalist(s)
Breanna Clark	400m T20	—N/a		57.09	1st place, gold medalist(s)
Kym Crosby	100m T13	—N/a		12.43	1st place, gold medalist(s)
Michelle Cross	100m T37	—N/a		15.81	5
Michelle Cross	200m T37	—N/a		32.63	4
Hannah Dederick	100m T54	—N/a		17.30 PR	1st place, gold medalist(s)
Hannah Dederick	400m T54	—N/a		58.96	1st place, gold medalist(s)
Hannah Dederick	800m T54	—N/a		2:06.30	2nd place, silver medalist(s)
Jenna Fesemyer	100m T54	—N/a		18.51	4
Jenna Fesemyer	400m T54	—N/a		59.68	2nd place, silver medalist(s)
Jenna Fesemyer	800m T54	—N/a		2:02.52	1st place, gold medalist(s)
Elizabeth Floch	100m T54	—N/a		19.26	5
Elizabeth Floch	400m T54	—N/a		1:06.00	3rd place, bronze medalist(s)
Catarina Guimarães	100m T38	—N/a		14.71	4
Catarina Guimarães	400m T38	—N/a		1:10.09	3rd place, bronze medalist(s)
Beatriz Hatz	100m T64	—N/a		13.71	2nd place, silver medalist(s)
Beatriz Hatz	200m T64	—N/a		28.13	2nd place, silver medalist(s)
Yen Hoang	100m T53	—N/a		19.59	4
Yen Hoang	400m T53	—N/a		1:02.95	2nd place, silver medalist(s)
Yen Hoang	800m T53	—N/a		2:08.09	1st place, gold medalist(s)
Kelsey Le Fevour	100m T53	—N/a		17.81	2nd place, silver medalist(s)
Kelsey Le Fevour	400m T53	—N/a		1:02.97	3rd place, bronze medalist(s)
Jasmine Murrell	100m T12	14.65	7	did not advance	
Arielle Rausin	800m T54	—N/a		2:12.87	3rd place, bronze medalist(s)
Jaleen Roberts	100m T37	—N/a		13.78 PR	1st place, gold medalist(s)
Jaleen Roberts	200m T37	—N/a		28.30 PR	1st place, gold medalist(s)
Nelya Schasfoort	100m T47	14.09	9	did not advance	
Nelya Schasfoort	200m T47	29.35	11	did not advance	
Nelya Schasfoort	400m T47	1:08.90	9	did not advance	
Deja Young	100m T47	12.32	1 Q	12.04	1st place, gold medalist(s)
Deja Young	200m T47	25.14	1 Q	24.86	1st place, gold medalist(s)

=== Women's field ===
Athlete	Class	Event	Final		
Athlete	Class	Event	Result	Points	Rank
Sydney Barta	F64	Discus throw F64	26.71	-	3rd place, bronze medalist(s)
Scout Bassett	T63	Long jump T42-44/T61-63	3.58	538	1st place, gold medalist(s)
Catherine Carey	T44	Long jump T42-44/T61-63	4.45	385	3rd place, bronze medalist(s)
Mikayla Chandler	F41	Discus throw F41	19.69	-	6
Mikayla Chandler	F41	Shot put F40/41	6.56	577	6
Catarina Guimarães	T38	Long jump T36/37/38	4.05	543	3rd place, bronze medalist(s)
Lacey Henderson	T63	Long jump T42-44/T61-63	3.39	397	2nd place, silver medalist(s)
Jessica Heims	F64	Discus throw F64	34.40 WR	-	1st place, gold medalist(s)
Sebastiana Lopez Arellano	F54	Discus throw F55	20.52 WR	-	5
Sebastiana Lopez Arellano	F54	Javelin throw F54	15.46	-	2nd place, silver medalist(s)
Sebastiana Lopez Arellano	F54	Shot put F53/54/55	7.63	968	3rd place, bronze medalist(s)
Jasmine Murrell	T12	Long jump T11-12	4.02	95	5
Jaleen Roberts	T37	Long jump T36/37/38	4.68	970	1st place, gold medalist(s)
Nelya Schasfoort	T45	Long jump T47	4.26 WR	-	7
Taleah Williams	T47	Long jump T47	5.16 PR	-	2nd place, silver medalist(s)

== Badminton ==
=== Men ===
Athlete	Event	Preliminaries			Semifinals	Final / BM	
Athlete	Event	Opposition Result	Opposition Result	Rank	Opposition Result	Opposition Result	Rank
Eric Johnson	Singles SL4	Cueto (PER); L 0-2	Anguiano (GUA); L 0-2	3	did not advance		
Miles Krajewski	Singles SS6	Abarca (CHI); W 2-0	Lightfoot (CAN); W 2-1	1 Q	Lightfoot (CAN); W 2-0	Tavares (BRA); L 1-2	2nd place, silver medalist(s)

=== Women ===
Athlete	Event	Preliminaries			Semifinals	Final / BM	
Athlete	Event	Opposition Result	Opposition Result	Rank	Opposition Result	Opposition Result	Rank
Amy Burnett	Singles WH2	Jauregui (PER); L 0-2	Soriano (CUB); L 0-2	3	did not advance		

== Swimming ==
35 swimmers competed in multiple swimming events.

=== Men ===
Athlete	Event	Heats		Final	
Athlete	Event	Result	Rank	Result	Rank
Caleb Cripe	100m backstroke S7	—N/a		1:23.54	6
Caleb Cripe	50m butterfly S7	—N/a		DSQ	
Caleb Cripe	200m individual medley SM7	3:21.58	9	did not advance	
Tye Dutcher	50m freestyle S10	27.31	5 Q	26.50	3rd place, bronze medalist(s)
Tye Dutcher	100m backstroke S10	—N/a		1:04.67	1st place, gold medalist(s)
Tye Dutcher	100m butterfly S10	—N/a		1:04.33	3rd place, bronze medalist(s)
David Gelfand	100m freestyle S9	1:03.42	2 Q	1:01.97	4
David Gelfand	400m freestyle S9	—N/a		4:40.49	4
David Gelfand	100m butterfly S9	DSQ		did not advance	
David Gelfand	100m breaststroke SB8	—N/a		DNS	
David Gelfand	200m individual medley SM9	—N/a		2:28.16	3rd place, bronze medalist(s)
Connor Gioffreda	50m freestyle S6	34.76	7 Q	34.27	6
Connor Gioffreda	100m freestyle S6	—N/a		1:14.12	5
Connor Gioffreda	400m freestyle S6	—N/a		5:35.17	4
Connor Gioffreda	50m butterfly S6	—N/a		35.55	5
Connor Gioffreda	200m individual medley SM6	3:18.17	7 Q	3:14.31	6
Jamal Hill	50m freestyle S10	26.32	2 Q	26.10	2nd place, silver medalist(s)
Jamal Hill	100m freestyle S10	59.96	4 Q	59.66	5
Jamal Hill	100m backstroke S10	—N/a		1:08.95	4
Ross Minor	400m freestyle S11	5:00.88	3 Q	4:54.93	3rd place, bronze medalist(s)
Ross Minor	100m breaststroke SB11	—N/a		1:32.87	6
Duncan Moss	200m freestyle S14	2:22.92	11	did not advance	
Duncan Moss	100m backstroke S14	1:12.30	9	did not advance	
Duncan Moss	200m individual medley SM14	DSQ		did not advance	
Sam Murray Jr	50m freestyle S9	29.96	6 Q	29.15	4
Sam Murray Jr	100m freestyle S9	1:03.94	3 Q	1:03.29	5
Sam Murray Jr	400m freestyle S9	—N/a		4:47.84	6
Sam Murray Jr	100m backstroke S9	—N/a		1:11.99	4
Sam Murray Jr	100m butterfly S9	1:09.36	5 Q	1:08.34	5
Sam Murray Jr	100m breaststroke SB8	—N/a		1:24.48	3rd place, bronze medalist(s)
Sam Murray Jr	200m individual medley SM9	—N/a		2:34.32	4
Joseph Peppersack	50m freestyle S8	—N/a		31.18	4
Joseph Peppersack	100m freestyle S8	—N/a		1:08.13	4
Joseph Peppersack	100m backstroke S8	—N/a		1:13.53	2nd place, silver medalist(s)
Joseph Peppersack	100m breaststroke SB7	—N/a		1:40.00	6
Jonathan Pierce	200m freestyle S14	2:09.27	5 Q	2:09.62	5
Jonathan Pierce	100m backstroke S14	1:14.67	10	did not advance	
Jonathan Pierce	100m butterfly S14	1:07.54	7 Q	1:06.52	7
Jonathan Pierce	100m breaststroke SB14	1:23.77	6 Q	1:21.07	6
Jonathan Pierce	200m individual medley SM14	2:32.79	7 Q	2:32.23	7
Morgan Ray	50m freestyle S7	—N/a		35.12	7
Morgan Ray	100m freestyle S7	—N/a		1:16.42	7
Morgan Ray	400m freestyle S7	—N/a		5:43.75	7
Morgan Ray	100m backstroke S7	—N/a		1:33.87	8
Morgan Ray	50m butterfly S7	—N/a		40.06	5
Morgan Ray	100m breaststroke SB7	—N/a		1:28.41	4
Morgan Ray	200m individual medley SM7	3:03.71	5 Q	3:00.96	8
Carson Sanocki	100m freestyle S13	57.16	2 Q	57.53	3rd place, bronze medalist(s)
Carson Sanocki	400m freestyle S13	4:37.13	1 Q	4:32.48	2nd place, silver medalist(s)
Carson Sanocki	200m individual medley SM13	—N/a		2:19.08 PR	1st place, gold medalist(s)
Zachary Shattuck	50m butterfly S6	—N/a		33.90	3rd place, bronze medalist(s)
Zachary Shattuck	100m breaststroke SB6	—N/a		1:26.31	2nd place, silver medalist(s)
Zachary Shattuck	200m individual medley SM6	2:56.58	3 Q	2:53.66	3rd place, bronze medalist(s)
Liam Smith	50m freestyle S8	—N/a		32.11	3rd place, bronze medalist(s)
Liam Smith	100m freestyle S7	—N/a		1:09.09	3rd place, bronze medalist(s)
Liam Smith	400m freestyle S7	—N/a		5:10.65	4
Liam Smith	100m breaststroke SB7	—N/a		1:28.16	2nd place, silver medalist(s)
Liam Smith	200m individual medley SM7	3:00.58	4 Q	2:51.81	4
Liam Smith	50m freestyle S7	—N/a		34.19	3rd place, bronze medalist(s)
Matthew Torres	100m freestyle S8	—N/a		1:03.91	3rd place, bronze medalist(s)
Matthew Torres	400m freestyle S9	—N/a		4:34.28 PR	1st place, gold medalist(s)
Matthew Torres	100m backstroke S8	—N/a		1:10.70	1st place, gold medalist(s)
Matthew Torres	200m individual medley SM8	—N/a		2:43.27	3rd place, bronze medalist(s)

=== Women ===
Athlete	Event	Heats		Final	
Athlete	Event	Result	Rank	Result	Rank
Hallie Anderson	100m breaststroke SB9	—N/a		1:32.39	5
Hannah Aspden	50m freestyle S9	30.53	2 Q	30.80	4
Hannah Aspden	100m freestyle S9	1:06.72	2 Q	1:06.76	3rd place, bronze medalist(s)
Hannah Aspden	400m freestyle S9	—N/a		5:01.05	1st place, gold medalist(s)
Hannah Aspden	100m backstroke S9	—N/a		1:13.20	1st place, gold medalist(s)
Grace Bristow	50m freestyle S10	32.33	6 Q	31.44	6
Grace Bristow	100m freestyle S10	1:10.45	7 Q	1:11.16	8
Grace Bristow	400m freestyle S10	—N/a		5:31.05	6
Grace Bristow	100m backstroke S10	—N/a		1:20.16	8
Leslie Cichocki	200m freestyle S14	—N/a		2:27.71	6
Leslie Cichocki	100m backstroke S14	—N/a		1:16.50	3rd place, bronze medalist(s)
Leslie Cichocki	100m butterfly S14	—N/a		1:14.95	2nd place, silver medalist(s)
Leslie Cichocki	100m breaststroke SB14	1:34.44	7 Q	1:34.72	7
Leslie Cichocki	200m individual medley SM14	—N/a		2:48.79	6
Alyssia Crook	400m freestyle S9	—N/a		5:12.19	3rd place, bronze medalist(s)
Abigail Gase	50m freestyle S7	—N/a		43.38	3rd place, bronze medalist(s)
Abigail Gase	100m freestyle S7	—N/a		1:31.68	4
Abigail Gase	100m backstroke S7	—N/a		1:33.92	1st place, gold medalist(s)
Abigail Gase	50m butterfly S7	—N/a		48.62	3rd place, bronze medalist(s)
Abigail Gase	200m individual medley SM7	—N/a		3:38.09	3rd place, bronze medalist(s)
Alyssa Gialamas	100m freestyle S5	1:38.09	4 Q	1:38.87	5
Alyssa Gialamas	200m freestyle S5	3:29.72	2 Q	3:28.68	2nd place, silver medalist(s)
Alyssa Gialamas	50m backstroke S5	48.80 PR	1 Q	47.65 PR	1st place, gold medalist(s)
Laurrie Hermes	50m freestyle S11	—N/a		38.92	4
Laurrie Hermes	100m freestyle S11	—N/a		1:23.05	4
Laurrie Hermes	400m freestyle S11	—N/a		5:52.62	2nd place, silver medalist(s)
Laurrie Hermes	100m backstroke S11	—N/a		1:32.80	3rd place, bronze medalist(s)
Laurrie Hermes	100m breaststroke SB11	—N/a		1:48.33	3rd place, bronze medalist(s)
Elise Morley	50m freestyle S9	30.96	4 Q	30.59	3rd place, bronze medalist(s)
Elise Morley	100m freestyle S9	1:08.21	3 Q	1:07.09	4
Abigail Nardella	50m freestyle S6	40.15	3 Q	40.00	5
Abigail Nardella	100m freestyle S6	1:31.57	6 Q	1:32.33	6
Abigail Nardella	100m backstroke S6	—N/a		1:59.12	7
Abigail Nardella	50m butterfly S6	48.04	8 Q	48.37	8
Abigail Nardella	100m breaststroke SB6	—N/a		2:10.82	3rd place, bronze medalist(s)
Abigail Nardella	200m individual medley SM6	—N/a		4:03.80	6
Amanda Palyo	100m backstroke S9	—N/a		1:20.23	3rd place, bronze medalist(s)
Cali Prochaska	100m butterfly S9	—N/a		1:13.39	4
Summer Schmit	100m breaststroke SB9	—N/a		1:27.95	3rd place, bronze medalist(s)
Summer Schmit	200m individual medley SM9	—N/a		2:42.23	2nd place, silver medalist(s)
Aspen Shelton	50m freestyle S12	—N/a		30.91	5
Aspen Shelton	100m freestyle S12	—N/a		1:06.95	3rd place, bronze medalist(s)
Aspen Shelton	100m backstroke S12	—N/a		1:15.98	2nd place, silver medalist(s)
Haven Shepherd	50m freestyle S8	—N/a		35.58	3rd place, bronze medalist(s)
Haven Shepherd	100m backstroke S8	—N/a		DSQ	
Haven Shepherd	100m butterfly S8	—N/a		1:33.00	5
Haven Shepherd	100m breaststroke SB7	1:45.70	2 Q	1:43.39	2nd place, silver medalist(s)
Haven Shepherd	200m individual medley SM8	—N/a		3:09.39	2nd place, silver medalist(s)
Natalie Sims	100m freestyle S9	1:05.18 PR	1 Q	1:06.05	1st place, gold medalist(s)
Natalie Sims	100m butterfly S9	—N/a		1:13.10	3rd place, bronze medalist(s)
Natalie Sims	200m individual medley SM9	—N/a		2:42.94	3rd place, bronze medalist(s)
Elizabeth Smith	50m freestyle S9	29.69 PR	1 Q	29.55 PR	1st place, gold medalist(s)
Elizabeth Smith	100m backstroke S9	—N/a		1:14.57	2nd place, silver medalist(s)
Elizabeth Smith	100m butterfly S9	—N/a		1:08.79 PR	1st place, gold medalist(s)
Samantha Tubbs	100m breaststroke SB9	—N/a		1:21.12	2nd place, silver medalist(s)
Madelyn White	400m freestyle S9	—N/a		5:01.25	2nd place, silver medalist(s)
Madelyn White	200m individual medley SM9	—N/a		2:48.10	4

== Table tennis ==
=== Men ===
Athlete	Event	Preliminaries				Quarterfinals	Semifinals	Final / BM	
Athlete	Event	Opposition Result	Opposition Result	Opposition Result	Rank	Opposition Result	Opposition Result	Opposition Result	Rank
Michael Godfrey	Men's singles C1	Eberhardt (ARG); L 0-3	Lima (BRA); L 0-3	Cuenca (CUB); L 0-3	4	did not advance			
James Segrest	Men's singles C2	Reyes (MEX); L 0-3	Moreno (VEN); W 3-1	—N/a	2 Q	Flores (CHI); L 0-3	did not advance		
Jenson Van Emburgh	Men's singles C3	Quijada (VEN); W 3-0	Traversso (PER); W 3-0	—N/a	1 Q	Freitas (BRA); W 3-1	Knaf (BRA); W 3-1	Copola (ARG); L 1-3	2nd place, silver medalist(s)
Edward Schneider	Men's singles C4	Rodriguez (CHI); L 0-3	Ank (BRA); L 0-3	Sandoval (VEN); L 0-3	4	did not advance			
Ahad Sarand	Men's singles C5	Romero (ARG); W 3-0	Salazar (GUA); W 3-0	—N/a	1 Q	—N/a	Rodriguez (ARG); W 3-0	Depergola (ARG); L 2-3	2nd place, silver medalist(s)
Ian Seidenfeld	Men's singles C6	Yanez (PER); W 3-0	Pino (CHI); W 3-2	Rodrigues (BRA); W 3-0	1 Q	—N/a	Dettoni (CHI); W 3-1	Pino (CHI); L 0-3	2nd place, silver medalist(s)
Marco Makkar	Men's singles C8	Kent (CAN); L 1-3	Perez (ARG); L 0-3	Fasanaro (VEN); W 3-1	3	did not advance			
Tahl Leibovitz	Men's singles C9	da Silva (BRA); W 3-0	Jimenez (COL); W 3-0	Rivera (PUR); W 3-0	1 Q	—N/a	Carvalho (BRA); W 3-0	Vazquez (MEX); W 3-2	1st place, gold medalist(s)
Jerry Vasquez	Men's singles C10	Massad (BRA); L 0-3	Munoz (ESA); L 2-3	—N/a	3	did not advance			

=== Women ===
Athlete	Event	Preliminaries				Semifinals	Final / BM	
Athlete	Event	Opposition Result	Opposition Result	Opposition Result	Rank	Opposition Result	Opposition Result	Rank
Pamela Fontaine	Women's singles C2-3	Azevedo (BRA); W 3-1	Blanco (ARG); W 3-0	—N/a	1 Q	Santos (BRA); L 0-3	did not advance	
Cynthia Ranii	Women's singles C2-3	Oliveira (BRA); L 0-3	Silva (CUB); L 0-3	—N/a	3	did not advance		
Jennifer Johnson	Women's singles C4	de Oliveira (BRA); L 0-3	Fernandez (VEN); L 0-3	—N/a	3	did not advance		
Terese Terranova	Women's singles C4	Guapi (COL); L 1-3	Verdin (MEX); L 0-3	Aguilar (PER); W 3-0	3	did not advance		

== Wheelchair basketball ==
The United States have qualified both the men's and women's teams.

== Wheelchair tennis ==
Six wheelchair tennis players are expected to compete.

== See also ==
- United States at the 2019 Pan American Games
