= Aruba at the 2019 Parapan American Games =

- IOC code: ARU
- NOC: Aruba Paralympic Committee
- Website: http://www.paralympic.org/aruba

in Lima 23 August – 1 September 2019
- Competitors: 1 in 1 sport
- Medals: Gold 0 Silver 0 Bronze 0 Total 0

Parapan American Games appearances
- 1999; 2003; 2007; 2011; 2015; 2019; 2023

Aruba participated in the 2019 Parapan American Games. They sent the same size delegation as the previous games.

== Competitors ==
The following table lists Aruba's delegation per sport and gender.

| Sport | Men | Women | Total |
|---|---|---|---|
| Taekwondo | 1 | 0 | 1 |
| Total | 1 | 0 | 1 |

== Taekwondo ==
| Athlete | Event | Round of 16 | Quarterfinals | Semifinals | Finals |
| Athlete | Event | Opposition Result | Opposition Result | Opposition Result | Opposition Result |
|---|---|---|---|---|---|
| Elliott Loonstra | Men's K44 over 75 kg | Alexandre dos Santos (USA); L 9–30 | Did not advance | | |
