= Peru at the 2019 Parapan American Games =

- IPC code: PER
- NPC: Peruvian Paralympic Committee

in Lima, Peru
- Competitors: 139 in 16 sports
- Flag bearer: Angelica Espinoza
- Medals Ranked 10th: Gold 5 Silver 3 Bronze 7 Total 15

Parapan American Games appearances
- 1999; 2003; 2007; 2011; 2015; 2019; 2023

Peru competed in the 2019 Parapan American Games from 23 August to 1 September as the host country. In total 139 athletes were scheduled to represent the country making this its largest delegation in its history. Athletes representing Peru won five gold medals, three silver medals and seven bronze medals and the country finished in 10th place in the medal table.

== Medalists ==
Medal	Name	Sport	Event
Gold	Rosbil Guillen	Athletics	Men's 1500m T11
Gold	Pedro de Vinatea	Badminton	Men's singles SL3
Gold	Pilar Jáuregui	Badminton	Women's singles WH2
Gold	Rimas Hilaro	Cycling	Men's time trial C1-5
Gold	Leonor Espinoza	Taekwondo	Women's -49kg
Silver	Luis Sandoval Lopez	Athletics	Men's 5000m T11
Silver	Carlos Felipa	Athletics	Men's shot put F63
Silver	Jorge Arcela	Shooting	Mixed 10m air rifle prone SH1
Bronze	Efrain Sotacuro	Athletics	Men's 1500m T46
Bronze	Hector Salva	Badminton	Men's singles SS6
Bronze	Antero Villalobos	Judo	Men's -81kg
Bronze	Juana Vasquez Molina	Powerlifting	Women's -50kg
Bronze	Rodrigo Santillan	Swimming	Men's 100m backstroke S2
Bronze	Donia Felices Rojas	Swimming	Women's 50m butterfly S5
Bronze	William Fernandez	Taekwondo	Men's -61kg

== Badminton ==
=== Men ===
Athlete	Event	Preliminaries			Semifinals	Final / BM	
Athlete	Event	Opposition Result	Opposition Result	Rank	Opposition Result	Opposition Result	Rank
Pedro de Vinatea	Singles SL3	Rosso (BRA); W 2-0	Bello (CUB); W 2-0	1 Q	Bello (CUB); W 2-0	Zuffo (BRA); W 2-0	1st place, gold medalist(s)
Pablo Cueto	Singles SL4	Anguiano (GUA); L 0-2	Johnson (USA); W 2-0	2 Q	Oliveira (BRA); L 0-2	P Lapointe (CAN); L 0-2	4
Alberto Cadenillas	Singles SU5	Ortiz (COL); L 1-2	Cavalli (BRA); L 0-2	3	did not advance		
Esteban Juarez	Singles SU5	Oliveira (BRA); L 0-2	Mijares (VEN); L 0-2	3	did not advance		
Hector Salva	Singles SS6	Ielpo (ARG); W 2-1	Tavares (BRA); L 0-2	2 Q	Tavares (BRA); L 0-2	Lightfoot (CAN); W 2-1	3rd place, bronze medalist(s)
Roberth Fajardo; Ronald Miranda	Doubles WH1-WH2	B Lapointe / Peter (CAN); L 0-2	Cano / Soares (BRA); L 0-2	3	did not advance		

=== Women ===
Athlete	Event	Preliminaries					Semifinals	Final / BM	
Athlete	Event	Opposition Result	Opposition Result	Opposition Result	Opposition Result	Rank	Opposition Result	Opposition Result	Rank
Pilar Jauregui	Singles WH2	Burnett (USA); W 2-0	Soriano (CUB); W 2-0	—		2 Q	Soriano (CUB); W 2-0	Chokyu (CAN); W 2-0	1st place, gold medalist(s)
Laura Puntriano	Singles SU5	Ventocilla (PER); L 0-2	Lanes (CUB); L 0-2	Meier (CAN); L 0-2	Almeida (BRA); L 0-2	—			5
Jenny Ventocilla	Singles SU5	Puntriano (PER); W 2-0	Meier (CAN); L 0-2	Almeida (BRA); L 0-2	Lanes (CUB); L 0-2	—			4

=== Mixed doubles ===
Athlete	Event	Preliminaries					Semifinals	Final / BM	
Athlete	Event	Opposition Result	Opposition Result	Opposition Result	Opposition Result	Rank	Opposition Result	Opposition Result	Rank
Pablo Cueto; Jenny Ventocilla	Doubles SL3/SU5	P Lapointe / Meier (CAN); L 0-2	Almeida / Rosso (BRA); L 0-2	Cavalli / Silva (BRA); L 0-2	Bello / Lanes (CUB); L 0-2	—			5

== Sitting volleyball ==
The men's Peruvian sitting volleyball team hope to win in the country's debut appearance in sitting volleyball.

== See also ==
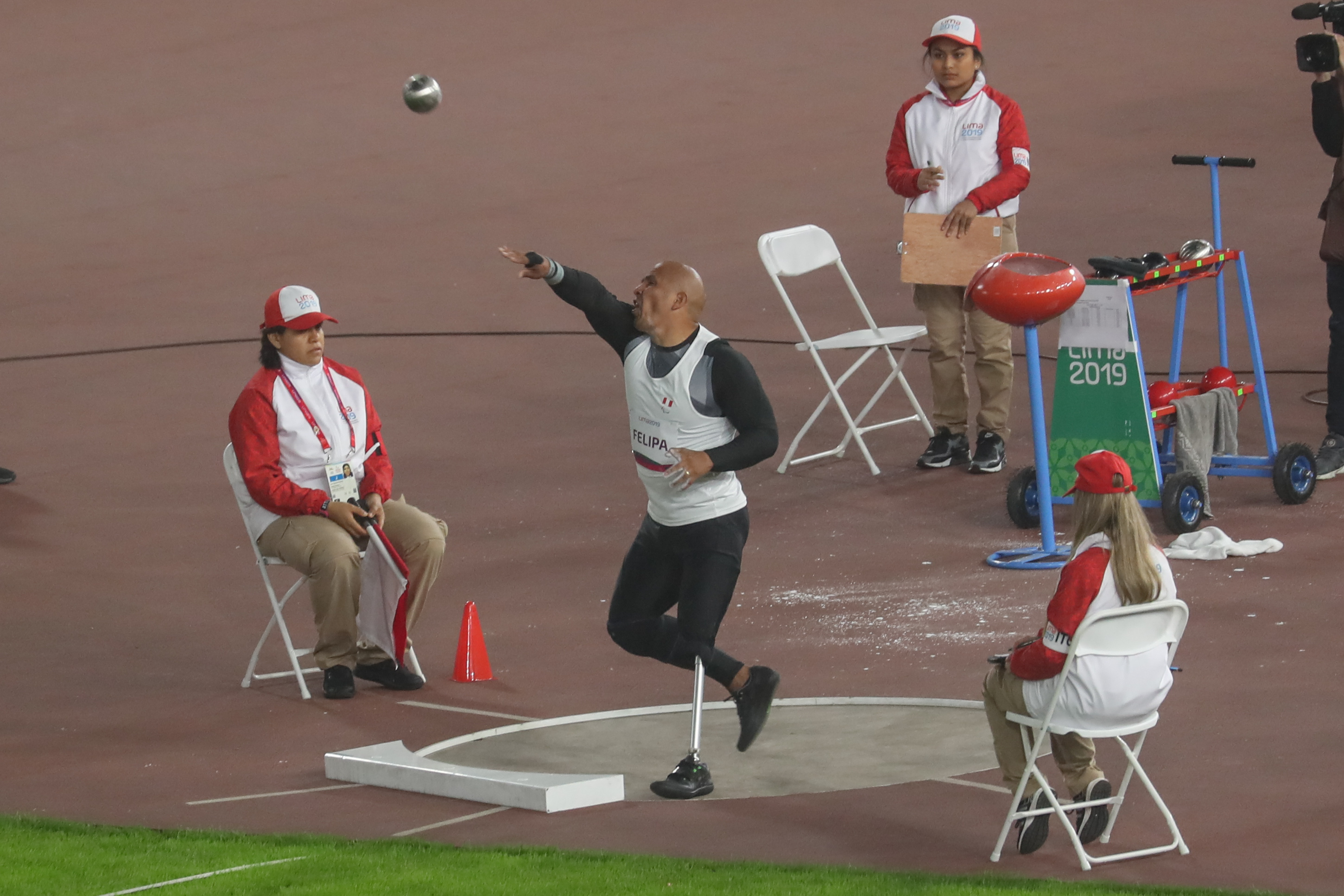
Shot put

- Peru at the 2019 Pan American Games
