= Shooting at the 2019 Parapan American Games =

- Competitors: 31 from 8 nations

Shooting made its debut in the 2019 Parapan American Games.

== Participating nations ==
31 sports shooters from 8 nations qualified to compete.

- Brazil (7)
- Canada (2)
- Colombia (4)
- Cuba (2)
- Mexico (1)
- Peru (1) (Host country)
- Uruguay (1)
- United States (13)

== Medal table ==
Rank	Nation	Gold	Silver	Bronze	Total
1	United States (USA)	5	1	3	9
2	Brazil (BRA)	2	5	3	10
3	Cuba (CUB)	1	1	1	3
4	Peru (PER)	0	1	0	1
5	Colombia (COL)	0	0	1	1
Totals (5 entries)		8	8	8	24

== Medalists ==
Event	Gold	Silver	Bronze
P1 - Men's 10m air pistol SH1	Geraldo Rosenthal; Brazil	Sérgio Adriano; Brazil	Michael Tagliapietra; United States
P2 - Women's 10m air pistol SH1	Yenigladys Suarez; Cuba	Débora Rodriguez; Brazil	Maria Restrepo; Colombia
P3 - Mixed 25m pistol SH1	Michael Tagliapietra; United States	Geraldo Rosenthal; Brazil	Yenigladys Suarez; Cuba
P4 - Mixed 50m pistol SH1	Kevin Nguyen; United States	Carlos Garletti; Brazil	Robert Beach; United States
R3 - Mixed 10m air rifle prone SH1	Taylor Farmer; United States	Jorge Arcela; Peru	Kevin Nguyen; United States
R4 - Mixed 10m air rifle standing SH2	Stetson Bardfield; United States	McKenna Dahl; United States	Bruno Kiefer; Brazil
R5 - Mixed 10m air rifle prone SH2	McKenna Dahl; United States	Alexandre Galgani; Brazil	Bruno Kiefer; Brazil
R6 - Mixed 50m rifle prone SH1	Geraldo Rosenthal; Brazil	Marino Heredia; Cuba	Sérgio Adriano; Brazil

== See also ==
- Shooting at the 2019 Pan American Games
- Shooting at the 2020 Summer Paralympics
