= Gase =

Gase is a surname. Notable people with the surname include:

- Abigail Gase (born 2002), American Paralympic swimmer
- Adam Gase (born 1978), American football coach
- Joey Gase (born 1993), American stock car racing driver

== See also ==
- List of populated places in the Tibet Autonomous Region#G
- GaSe, the chemical formula of gallium(II) selenide
