= Carla Shibley =

Canadian para-cyclist

Personal information
- Born: September 19, 1990 (age 35)
- Home town: Calgary, Alberta, Canada

Sport
- Sport: Para-cycling
- Disability class: B
Medal record
Para-cycling
Representing Canada
Parapan American Games
Gold medal – first place	2019 Lima	Road race B
Gold medal – first place	2019 Lima	Tandem individual pursuit
Silver medal – second place	2019 Lima	1,000-metre tandem time trial
Bronze medal – third place	2019 Lima	Mixed tandem time trial

Carla Shibley (born September 19, 1990) is a Canadian para-cyclist. She won four medals at the 2019 Parapan American Games and was named one of Canada's flag bearers for the Closing Ceremony.

== Early life ==
Shibley was diagnosed with Stargardt disease at age 10, leading to her vision loss.

== Career ==
Shibley originally got into adaptive sport through running and goalball. She began para-cycling in 2015.

Shibley competed in para-cycling at the 2019 Parapan American Games with pilot Meghan Lemiski. They won gold medals in the women's tandem road race and women's tandem individual pursuit, a silver in the women's 1,000-metre tandem time trial, and a bronze medal in the mixed tandem time trial. She was named a Closing Ceremony flag bearer for Canada at the Games.

Shibley and Lemiski won the 2021 Canada Paracycling National Championship in women's tandem. They came second in the women's tandem time trial. In 2023, Shibley and pilot Meghan Brown, placed tenth in the para road cycling world championships. She won bronze, with Brown, in the women's tandem at the 2024 Para Cycling World Cup in Adelaide.
