= Trinidad and Tobago at the 2019 Parapan American Games =

- Flag of Trinidad and Tobago
- IPC code: TTO

in Lima, Peru August 23, 2019 – September 1, 2019
- Competitors: 5 (3 men and 2 women) in 3 sports
- Flag bearer: Nyoshia Cain-Claxton
- Medals Ranked 12th: Gold 2 Silver 1 Bronze 1 Total 4

Parapan American Games appearances
- 1999; 2003; 2007; 2011; 2015; 2019; 2023

Trinidad and Tobago competed at the 2019 Parapan American Games held from August 23 to September 1, 2019 in Lima, Peru. In total, athletes representing Trinidad and Tobago won two gold medals, one silver medal and one bronze medal. All medals were won in athletics. The country finished in 12th place in the medal table.

== Medalists ==
Medal	Name	Sport	Event
Gold	Nyoshia Cain-Claxton	Athletics	Women's 100 metres T64
Gold	Akeem Stewart	Athletics	Men's discus throw F64
Silver	Akeem Stewart	Athletics	Men's javelin throw F64
Bronze	Nyoshia Cain-Claxton	Athletics	Women's 200 metres T64

== Athletics ==
Nyoshia Cain-Claxton won the gold medal in the women's 100 metres T64 event and the bronze medal in the women's 200 metres T64 event.

Akeem Stewart won the gold medal in the men's discus throw F64 event and the silver medal in the men's javelin throw F64 event.

Ronald Carlos Greene represented Trinidad and Tobago in the men's shot put F11 and men's discus throw F11 events at the 2019 Parapan American Games.

== Swimming ==
Shanntol Ince represented Trinidad and Tobago in swimming at the 2019 Parapan American Games.

== Table tennis ==
Dennis La Rose represented Trinidad and Tobago in table tennis at the 2019 Parapan American Games.
