= Gabriela Mendonça =

Brazilian athlete (born 1998)

Personal information
- Born: 21 May 1998 (age 28) Campo Grande, Mato Grosso do Sul, Brazil

Sport
- Sport: Paralympic athletics
- Disability: Chorioretinitis
- Disability class: T12
Medal record
Representing Brazil
World Championships
Bronze medal – third place	2019 Dubai	Long jump T12
Parapan American Games
Gold medal – first place	2019 Lima	Long jump T13
Bronze medal – third place	2019 Lima	100m T12

Gabriela Mendonça Ferreira (born 21 May 1998) is a Brazilian Paralympic athlete who competes in international track and field competitions. She is a Parapan American Games bronze medalist and a World bronze medalist. She competed at the 2024 Summer Paralympics.

Mendonça was born with bilateral chorioretinitis as her mother was bitten by a cat infected with toxoplasmosis when she was pregnant.
