= Cycling at the 2019 Parapan American Games =

Para-cycling at the 2019 Parapan American Games in Lima, Peru consisted of road and track disciplines. The road competitions were held at the Circuito San Miguel while the track competitions were held at the velodrome.

== Medal table ==
* Host nation (Peru)

Rank	Nation	Gold	Silver	Bronze	Total
1	United States	7	6	5	18
2	Colombia	7	6	3	16
3	Canada	4	6	3	13
4	Brazil	3	1	4	8
5	Argentina	1	3	5	9
6	Peru*	1	0	0	1
7	Costa Rica	0	1	0	1
8	Dominican Republic	0	0	1	1
Totals (8 entries)		23	23	21	67

== Medalists ==
=== Road cycling ===
Event	Class	Gold	Silver	Bronze
Men's road race	B	Nelson Serna; Colombia (Pilot: Marlon Perez)	Raul Villalbal; Argentina (Pilot: Ezequiel Romero)	Maximiliano; Argentina (Pilot: Sebastian Tolosa)
Men's road race	C 1–3	Alejandro Perea; Colombia	Henry Raabe; Costa Rica	Joseph Berenyi; United States
Men's road race	C 4–5	Lauro Moro; Brazil	Carlos Vargas; Colombia	Jose Rodriguez; Dominican Republic
Men's road race	H 3–5	Eduardo Ramos; Brazil	Brandon Lyons; United States	Oscar Biga; Argentina
Women's road race	B Archived 2019-09-01 at the Wayback Machine	Carla Shibley; Canada (Pilot: Megan Lemiski)	Annie Bouchard; Canada (Pilot: Evelyne Gagnon)	Marcia Ribeiro; Brazil (Pilot: Cristiane Pereira)
Women's road race	C 1–3; Archived 2019-09-01 at the Wayback Machine	Clara Brown; United States	Daniela Munevar; Colombia	
Women's road race	C 4–5	Mariela Delgado; Argentina	Paula Ossa; Colombia	Samantha Bosco; United States
Mixed road race	T 1–2	Nestor Ayala; Colombia	Matthew Rodriguez; United States	Michael Shetler; Canada
Men's time trial	C 1–5	Rimas Hilaro; Peru	Lauro Moro; Brazil	Diego Duenas; Colombia
Women's time trial	C 1–5	Clara Brown; United States	Daniela Munevar; Colombia	Samantha Bosco; United States
Mixed time trial	B	Nelson Serna; Colombia (Pilot: Marlon Perez)	Lowell Taylor; Canada (Pilot: Andrew Davidson)	Carla Shibley; Canada (Pilot: Megan Lemiski)
Mixed time trial	H 1–5	Matthew Kinnie; Canada	Brandon Lyons; United States	Eduardo Ramos; Brazil
Mixed time trial	T 1–2	Jill Walsh; United States	Matthew Rodriguez; United States	Michael Shetler; Canada

==== Non-medal events ====
- Women's Road Race H3-5
- Mixed Road Race H1-2

=== Track cycling ===
==== Men's event ====
Event	Class	Gold	Silver	Bronze
1 km time trial	B	Nelson Serna; Colombia (Pilot:Marlon Perez)	Maximiliano Gomez; Argentina (Pilot:Sebastian Tolosa)	Raul Villalbal; Argentina (Pilot:Ezequiel Romero)
1 km time trial	C 1–5; Archived 2019-08-26 at the Wayback Machine	Joseph Berenyi; United States	Christopher Murphy; United States	Edwin Matiz; Colombia
Individual Pursuit	B	Nelson Serna; Colombia (Pilot:Marlon Perez)	Lowell Taylor; Canada (Pilot:Andrew Davidson)	Maximiliano Gomez; Argentina (Pilot:Sebastian Tolosa)
Individual Pursuit	C 1–3	Alejandro Perea; Colombia	Joseph Berenyi; United States	Jason Kimball; United States
Individual Pursuit	C 4–5	Lauro Moro; Brazil	Diego Duenas; Colombia	Carlos Vargas; Colombia

==== Women's event ====
Event	Class	Gold	Silver	Bronze
500m time trial	C 1–5	Samantha Bosco; United States	Mariela Delgado; Argentina	Clara Brown; United States
1 km time trial	B Archived 2019-08-27 at the Wayback Machine	Annie Bouchard; Canada (Pilot:Evelyne Gagnon)	Carla Shibley; Canada (Pilot:Meghan Lemiski)	Márcia Ribeiro; Brazil (Pilot:Cristiane Pereira)
Individual Pursuit	B	Carla Shibley; Canada (Pilot:Meghan Lemiski)	Annie Bouchard; Canada (Pilot:Evelyne Gagnon)	Márcia Ribeiro; Brazil (Pilot:Cristiane Pereira)
Individual Pursuit	C 1–3	Clara Brown; United States	Daniela Munevar; Colombia	
Individual Pursuit	C 4–5	Samantha Bosco; United States	Marie-Claude Molnar; Canada	Mariela Delgado; Argentina
