= Powerlifting at the 2019 Parapan American Games =

- Venue: VIDENA Sports Center 2
- Dates: August 29 to 31

Paralympic powerlifting competitions at the 2019 Parapan American Games in Lima were held from August 29 to 31 at the VIDENA Sports Center 2.

== Medal table ==
* Host nation (Peru)

Rank	Nation	Gold	Silver	Bronze	Total
1	Brazil (BRA)	6	3	7	16
2	Mexico (MEX)	3	4	0	7
3	Colombia (COL)	3	3	1	7
4	Chile (CHI)	1	3	2	6
5	Cuba (CUB)	1	1	1	3
6	El Salvador (ESA)	1	0	0	1
7	United States (USA)	0	1	0	1
8	Venezuela (VEN)	0	0	3	3
9	Peru (PER)*	0	0	1	1
Totals (9 entries)		15	15	15	45

== Medalists ==
=== Men's event ===
Event	Gold		Silver		Bronze	
49kg	João De França Junior; Brazil	141kg (PR)	Jhonny Morales; Colombia	125kg	Lucas Dos Santos; Brazil	123kg
54kg	Bruno Pinheiro Carra; Brazil	163kg (PR)	César Rubio Guerra; Cuba	145kg	Juan Ortiz Cardenas; Colombia	138kg
59kg	Juan Carlos Garrido; Chile	185kg (PR)	Luciano Bezerra Dantas; Brazil	151kg	Carlos Betancourt; Venezuela	150kg
65kg	Herbert Aceituno; El Salvador	182kg (PR)	Jorge Carinao; Chile	176kg	Danilo Rodriguez Garcia; Cuba	170kg
72kg	Ezequiel De Souza; Brazil	171kg	Javier Montenegro; Colombia	170kg	Jackson Blanco Perez; Venezuela	168kg
80kg	Francisco Palomeque; Colombia	195kg (PR)	Porfirio Arredondo Luna; Mexico	184kg	Aílton De Andrade Bento; Brazil	178kg
88kg and 97kg combined	Evânio Rodrigues; Brazil	182.34kg (PR)	Ahmed Shafik; United States	168.68kg	Rodrigo Rosa; Brazil	168.28kg
107kg	José Castillo Castillo; Mexico	226kg (PR)	Fabio Torres; Colombia	220kg	Mateus De Assis Silva; Brazil	201kg
107kg+	Jhon Castaneda; Colombia	220kg (PR)	Miguel Melendez Made; Mexico	171kg	Christian Porteiro; Brazil	168kg

=== Women's event ===
Event	Gold		Silver		Bronze	
41kg and 45kg combined	Leidy Rodriguez; Cuba	103.23kg (PR)	Lara Sullivan; Brazil	97.34kg	Clara Fuentes; Venezuela	97.31kg (PR)
50kg	Maria Luzineide Santos; Brazil	88kg (PR)	Mayra Hernandez Godinez; Mexico	83kg	Juana Vasquez Molina; Peru	40kg
55kg	Amalia Perez Vazquez; Mexico	120kg (PR)	Camila Campos; Chile	105kg	Renée Da Silva Souza; Brazil	78kg
61kg and 67kg combined	Mariana D'Andrea; Brazil	114.35kg (PR)	Miriam Aguilar Jimenez; Mexico	98.62kg	Pamela Munoz Rojas; Chile	61.65kg
73kg	Bertha Fernández; Colombia	111kg (PR)	María Ortiz Becker; Chile	109kg	Amanda Santos De Sousa; Brazil	93kg
79kg and 86kg combined	Perla Barcenas; Mexico	107.98kg (PR)	Tayana De Souza; Brazil	97.05kg (PR)	Marion Serrano; Chile	91.85kg

== See also ==
- Weightlifting at the 2019 Pan American Games
