= Olivia Meier =

Canadian para badminton player

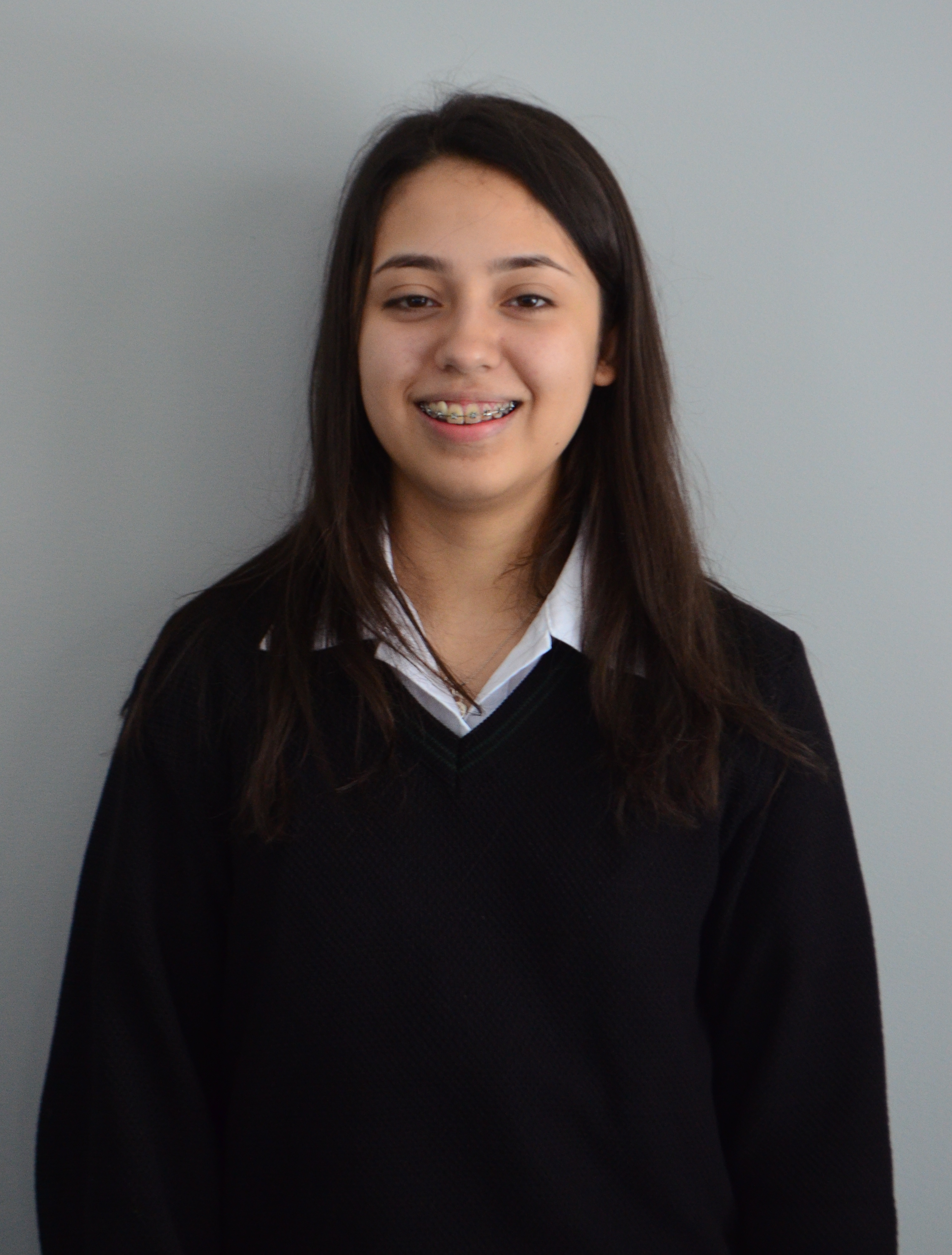
- Meier in 2017

Personal information
- Born: April 14, 1999 (age 27) Farmington, Connecticut, United States

Sport
- Country: Canada
- Sport: Badminton
- Coached by: Elliot Beals

Women's singles SL4 Women's doubles SL3–SU5 Mixed doubles SL3–SU5
- Highest ranking: 7 (WS 25 April 2022); 8 (WD with Jenny Huaranga 22 September 2022); 8 (XD with Pascal Lapointe 1 January 2019)
- Current ranking: 7 (WS); 10 (WD with Jenny Huaranga); 14 (XD with Pascal Lapointe) (15 November 2022)
Medal record
Para badminton
Representing Canada
Parapan American Games
Gold medal – first place	2019 Lima	Mixed doubles
Silver medal – second place	2019 Lima	Women's singles
Bronze medal – third place	2023 Santiago	Women's singles
Pan Am Championships
Gold medal – first place	2018 Lima	Mixed doubles
Silver medal – second place	2018 Lima	Women's doubles
Silver medal – second place	2018 Lima	Women's singles

Olivia Meier (born April 14, 1999) is a Canadian para badminton player who competes in both singles and doubles competitions in international level events. She qualified to represent Canada at the 2020 Summer Paralympics, in women's singles SL4.

Meier is a two time recipient of the Petro Canada FACE program. Meier was named the Canadian Para-Badminton athlete of the year by Badminton Canada in 2020, following her gold and silver medals at the Parapan American games. She is currently sponsored by YONEX Canada, SpiderTech, and is a Bell Canada athlete.

== Personal life ==
Meier has a disability called hemiparesis. She began playing badminton aged eight at the Winnipeg Winter Club, and started competing at age ten. She completed her undergraduate studies at the University of Manitoba. She is currently a law student at the University of Ottawa.

== Achievements ==
=== Parapan American Games ===
Women's singles

Year	Venue	Opponent	Score	Result
2019 (Note: This tournament uses a round robin system.)	National Sport Village, Lima, Peru	(Brazil) Mikaela Costa Almeida	12–21, 15–21	Silver
2019	National Sport Village, Lima, Peru	(Cuba) Laura Yanes Carbrera	21–6, 21–12	Silver
2019	National Sport Village, Lima, Peru	(Peru) Laura Puntriano	21–1, 21–3	Silver
2019	National Sport Village, Lima, Peru	(Peru) Jenny Ventocilla	21–5, 21–2	Silver

Mixed doubles

Year	Venue	Partner	Opponent	Score	Result
2019 (Note: This tournament uses a round robin system.)	National Sport Village, Lima, Peru	(Canada) Pascal Lapointe	(Peru) Pablo Cesar Cueto (Peru) Jenny Ventocilla	21–15, 21–7	Gold
2019	National Sport Village, Lima, Peru	(Canada) Pascal Lapointe	(Brazil) Renan Augusto Rosso (Brazil) Mikaela Costa Almeida	21–8, 21–16	Gold
2019	National Sport Village, Lima, Peru	(Canada) Pascal Lapointe	(Cuba) Rolando Bello Rodriguez (Cuba) Laura Yanes Carbrera	21–11, 21–11	Gold
2019	National Sport Village, Lima, Peru	(Canada) Pascal Lapointe	(Brazil) Ricardo Cavalli (Brazil) Abinaecia Maria da Silva	21–16, 18–21, 21–19	Gold

=== Pan Am Championships ===
Women's singles

Year	Venue	Opponent	Score	Result
2018	Polideportivo 2, Lima, Peru	(Brazil) Cintya Oliveira	21–14, 18–21, 16–21	Silver

Women's doubles

Year	Venue	Partner	Opponent	Score	Result
2018 (Note: This tournament uses a round robin system.)	Polideportivo 2, Lima, Peru	(Peru) Jenny Ventocilla	(Peru) Xustinia Ponce (Peru) Laura Puntriano	21–3, 21–8	Silver
2018	Polideportivo 2, Lima, Peru	(Peru) Jenny Ventocilla	(Peru) Rosario Chávez (Brazil) Mikaela Costa Almeida	21–18, 21–14	Silver
2018	Polideportivo 2, Lima, Peru	(Peru) Jenny Ventocilla	(Brazil) Abinaecia Maria da Silva (Brazil) Cintya Oliveira	19–21, 9–21	Silver

Mixed doubles

Year	Venue	Partner	Opponent	Score	Result
2018	Polideportivo 2, Lima, Peru	(Canada) Pascal Lapointe	(Brazil) Ricardo Cavalli (Brazil) Abinaecia Maria da Silva	21–16, 21–13	Gold

=== BWF Para Badminton World Circuit (1 runner-up) ===
The BWF Para Badminton World Circuit – Grade 2, Level 1, 2 and 3 tournaments has been sanctioned by the Badminton World Federation from 2022.

Women's singles

Year	Tournament	Level	Opponent	Score	Result
2022	Brazil Para Badminton International	Level 2	(India) Jyothi Verma	21–18, 18–21, 13–21	(silver) Runner-up
