= Aruba at the 2023 Parapan American Games =

- Flag of Aruba
- IPC code: ARU
- NPC: Aruba Paralympic Committee
- Website: www.paralympic.org/aruba

in Santiago, Chile 17 November 2023 – 26 November 2023
- Competitors: 1 in 1 sport
- Flag bearer (opening): Elliott Loonstra
- Flag bearer (closing): Elliott Loonstra
- Medals Ranked 19th: Gold 0 Silver 0 Bronze 1 Total 1

Parapan American Games appearances
- 2015; 2019; 2023

Aruba is scheduled to compete in the 2023 Parapan American Games in Santiago, Chile from 17 November to 26 November 2023. This was Aruba's third appearance at the Parapan American Games, having first competed in the 2015 edition.

Paralympic taekwondo practitioner Elliott Loonstra was the country's flagbearer during the opening ceremony and the closing ceremony. The only athlete of the country in the competition, Loonstra would later go on to win Aruba's first ever Parapan American Games medal, a bronze in the men's 80 kg event.

== Medalists ==
The following competitors won medals at the games. In the discipline sections below, the medalists' names are bolded.

Medal	Name	Sport	Event	Date
Bronze	Elliott Loonstra	Taekwondo	Men's 80 kg	November 25

== Competitors ==
The following is the list of number of competitors (per gender) participating at the games per sport/discipline.

Sport	Men	Women	Total
Taekwondo	1	0	1
Total	1	0	1

== Taekwondo ==
Men

Athlete	Event	Quarterfinals	Semifinals	Repechage	Final / BM	
Athlete	Event	Opposition Result	Opposition Result	Opposition Result	Opposition Result	Rank
**Elliott Loonstra**	−80 kg	Molina (CRC); **L** 5–16	Did not advance	Kacer (USA); **W** 11–4	Bronze medal final Gomes (BRA); **W** 27–22	3rd place, bronze medalist(s)

== See also ==
- Aruba at the 2023 Pan American Games
- Aruba at the 2024 Summer Paralympics
