= Ross Minor =

American accessibility content creator (born 1998)

Personal information
- Born: Ross Andrew Minor; May 29, 1998 (age 28) Virginia Beach, Virginia, US
- Occupations: Content creator, streamer, accessibility consultant, para swimmer
- Website: www.RossMinor.com
Medal record
Para swimming
Representing United States
Parapan American Games
| Gold medal – first place | 2019 Lima | 4×100 metre relay 49 pts |
| Bronze medal – third place | 2019 Lima | 400 metres freestyle S11 |

Ross Andrew Minor (born May 29, 1998) is a blind American accessibility content creator and former para swimmer. He is the second son of Mark and Grace Minor with an older brother, Ryan. On June 14, 2006, his father went into his room while he was sleeping and shot him in the head. Minor's father then did the same to his brother before committing suicide. All three were rushed to the hospital where his brother died, while Ross was left completely blind and without a sense of smell. Minor would later attend the Florida School for the Deaf and Blind for three years, become captain of the Bishop John J. Snyder High School swim team, and begin making online media about his story, blindness, and accessibility as a student. In 2018, Minor became a Paralympic swimmer and trained at the Olympic and Paralympic Training Center in Colorado Springs, Colorado.

== Early life and education ==
Minor was born on May 29, 1998. On June 14, 2006, his father went into his room while he was sleeping and shot him in the head. As a result, Minor lost all function in his right eye, as well as losing his left eye, rendering him completely blind. Minor's father then did the same to his brother Ryan, before committing suicide. All three were rushed to the hospital, where Minor's father was pronounced dead. Ryan later died from his injuries, while Minor was left blind and without a sense of smell. After going blind, Minor needed to reintegrate into society and as such, he began the path to learning how to read and write braille, walk with a white cane, use technology, and interact with people in the world around him.

Since he was attending a private elementary school, he was ineligible for services such as a Teacher for the Visually Impaired (TVI), and an Orientation and Mobility (O&M) instructor offered through CMS, the public school system in Charlotte, North Carolina. The solution that CMS proposed was to bus Minor 45 minutes across the city to a classroom, where he could learn alongside other blind students. In response, his mother filed a lawsuit stating that with a child likely to have post-traumatic stress disorder, it would be most beneficial for him to attend a school with which he was most familiar.

In the end, Minor and his mother won the lawsuit, but not before he was forced to transfer to a public school due to the cost of having to pay for a TVI and O&M instructor while the lawsuit was pending. During his time in the education system, Minor quickly discovered the challenges of advocating for himself and to explain what assistance he needed. Many times, teachers would forget to explain what was on the board or exclude him from sight heavy tasks. In other extreme circumstances, teachers would often pair him with other students or completely exempt him from assignments to avoid having to make his materials accessible. It was only the use of technology that allowed Minor to excel and prevented him from falling behind.

After going blind, Minor was initially reluctant to use technology of any kind because of how unfamiliar it was to him, until he attended the Florida School for the Deaf and Blind, where he began to observe and understand how technology could really help those with disabilities. Seeing the speed and proficiency at which some of his blind classmates used their computers inspired him to begin learning all he could about accessible technology and this is what prompted him to delve into his computer and iPhone to unlock their potential for him. By the age of 15, Minor was learning how to program and navigate various operating systems such as Windows, Mac OS, and Linux. Eventually, Minor found himself teaching other friends about accessible technology, which in turn, ignited his passion for educating the world about accessibility.

Formative mainstream video games for him that he played with audio queues and sighted assistance included Pokémon Ruby and Left 4 Dead 2, though many such games were inaccessible to him. He has a large tattoo of the water Pokémon Gyarados on his right arm.

== Career ==
In 2017, Minor participated on /r/AMA, a subreddit that allows users to post about themselves and have people ask questions in the comments. On there, Minor explained how he went blind, how he lived his life, and how ordinary people can make the world a more accessible space. The AMA exponentially propagated across Reddit and the internet, and before long, Minor was convinced to create a YouTube channel and share what it is like to live his life without sight. At the request of the ongoing AMA, Minor created and uploaded his very first video explaining how he plays Mortal Kombat X without sight. The video went viral and only encouraged him more to create content that educates and helps people.

After graduating from high school, Minor has continued to close the gap between the disabled and sighted world by demonstrating ways he lives his life blind, creating accessible technology reviews, and playing video games for the entire world to see. He has worked alongside developers such as EA Games to make their Madden titles more accessible to blind players. He was an accessibility consultant for the Xbox games on Sea of Thieves and As Dusk Falls, and also narrated the audio description track for the 2024 Netflix series The Last Airbender. He was listed in the Future Class at The Game Awards 2023. From 2018 to 2021, Minor moved to Colorado Springs, Colorado, to live and train at the Olympic and Paralympic Training Center as a Paralympic swimmer, where he went on to travel the world with Team USA and win medals while continuing his online career in gaming, technology, and disability advocacy. At the 2019 Parapan American Games in Lima, Peru, he won a gold medal as part of the 49 points 4×100 m Freestyle Relay team and a bronze medal in the 400m Freestyle S11. In November 2020, he announced his retirement from the Paralympic team, mainly to concentrate on his education; the year-long postponement of the 2020 Tokyo Paralympics, the lockdowns due to the COVID-19 pandemic, and what he described as a "long period of depression" greatly hampered his preparation for the games. He later moved from Colorado to Los Angeles in the hope that it would help his career. In 2023, Minor graduated with an Associate of Arts in Computer Science from Seminole State College of Florida and became a Certified Professional in Accessibility Core Competencies (CPACC).

== Appearances ==
=== Television ===
| Year | Title | Role | Notes |
|---|---|---|---|
| 2019 | Unbreakable: Live to Tell - Mother's Day episode | Himself | TV special documentary |
