= Joseph Berenyi =

American Paralympic cyclist (born 1968)

Personal information
- Born: November 12, 1968 (age 57) Aurora, Illinois, United States

Cycling career
- Sport: Cycling
- Disciplines: Track cycling, road cycling
Medal record
Track Cycling
Representing United States
Paralympic Games
Gold medal – first place	2012 London	3km Pursuit
Silver medal – second place	2012 London	Road Time Trial
Silver medal – second place	2016 Rio de Janeiro	3km Pursuit
Bronze medal – third place	2012 London	TeamSprint
UCI Para-cycling Track World Championships
Gold medal – first place	2015 Apeldoorn	1km Time Trial
Gold medal – first place	2015 Apeldoorn	3km Pursuit
Gold medal – first place	2016 Montichiari	3km Pursuit
Gold medal – first place	2016 Montichiari	1km time trial
Gold medal – first place	2018 Rio de Janeiro	1km Time Trial
Gold medal – first place	2019 Apeldoorn	1km Time Trial
Silver medal – second place	2014 Aguascalientes	3km Pursuit
Silver medal – second place	2015 Apeldoorn	Scratch Race
Silver medal – second place	2019 Apeldoorn	Scratch Race
Bronze medal – third place	2018 Rio de Janeiro	3km Pursuit
Bronze medal – third place	2019 Apeldoorn	Team Sprint
Parapan American Games
Gold medal – first place	2015 Toronto	Road race
Gold medal – first place	2015 Toronto	Individual pursuit
Gold medal – first place	2015 Toronto	1km time trial
Gold medal – first place	2019 Lima	1km time trial
Silver medal – second place	2019 Lima	Individual pursuit
Bronze medal – third place	2019 Lima	Road race

Joseph Berenyi (born November 12, 1968) is an American Paralympic track and road cyclist. He won gold, silver and bronze medals at the 2012 Paralympic Games held in London.

Berenyi was born in Aurora, Illinois in 1968 to Joe and Dolores Berenyi. He was injured in a construction accident leading to him losing his right arm and left knee cap.
