= Jamaica at the 2019 Parapan American Games =

- Flag of Jamaica
- IPC code: JAM
- NPC: Jamaica Paralympic Association

in Lima, Peru August 23, 2019 – September 1, 2019
- Competitors: 9 (7 men and 2 women) in 3 sports
- Flag bearer: Chadwick Campbell
- Medals Ranked 20th: Gold 0 Silver 2 Bronze 2 Total 4

Parapan American Games appearances
- 1999; 2003; 2007; 2011; 2015; 2019; 2023

Jamaica competed at the 2019 Parapan American Games held from August 23 to September 1, 2019 in Lima, Peru. In total, athletes representing Jamaica won two silver medals and two bronze medals. The country finished in 20th place in the medal table.

== Medalists ==
Medal	Name	Sport	Event
Silver	Chadwick Campbell	Athletics	Men's 100 metres T13
Silver	Santana Campbell	Athletics	Women's javelin throw F56
Bronze	Theador Subba	Judo	Men's +100 kg
Bronze	Shauna-Kay T. Hines	Taekwondo	Women's 58 kg

== Athletics ==
Chadwick Campbell won the silver medal in the men's 100 metres T13 event.

Santana Campbell won the silver medal in the women's javelin throw F56 event.

== Judo ==
Theador Subba won one of the bronze medals in the men's +100 kg event.

== Taekwondo ==
Shauna-Kay T. Hines won one of the bronze medals in the women's 58 kg event.
