= Panama at the 2019 Parapan American Games =

- Flag of Panama
- IPC code: PAN
- NPC: Paralympic Committee of Panama

in Lima, Peru August 23, 2019 – September 1, 2019
- Competitors: 14 (11 men and 3 women)
- Medals Ranked 21st: Gold 0 Silver 1 Bronze 1 Total 2

Parapan American Games appearances
- 1999; 2003; 2007; 2011; 2015; 2019; 2023

Panama competed at the 2019 Parapan American Games held from August 23 to September 1, 2019 in Lima, Peru. In total, athletes representing Panama won one silver medal and one bronze medal. Both medals were won in athletics. The country finished in 21st place in the medal table.

== Medalists ==
| Medal | Name | Sport | Event |
|---|---|---|---|
| Silver | Francisco Cedeño | Athletics | Men's shot put F55 |
| Bronze | Gertrudis Ortega | Athletics | Men's shot put F32/33/34 |

== Athletics ==
Francisco Cedeño won the silver medal in the men's shot put F55 event.

Gertrudis Ortega won the bronze medal in the men's shot put F32/33/34 event.
