= Athletics at the 2019 Parapan American Games =

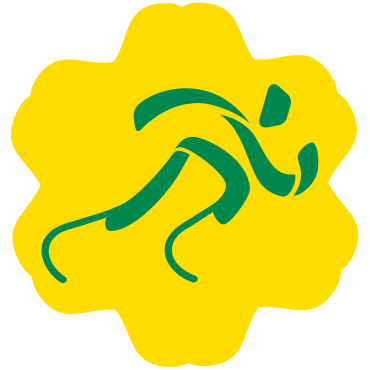
- Venue: VIDENA Athletics Stadium
- Dates: 24 to 28 August
- Competitors: 427 from 27 nations

Athletics at the 2019 Parapan American Games in Lima, Peru were held in the VIDENA Athletics Stadium .

== Medal table ==
Brazil topped the medal table with 82 medals.

* Host nation (Peru)

Rank	Nation	Gold	Silver	Bronze	Total
1	Brazil	32	27	22	81
2	United States	26	25	14	65
3	Mexico	16	16	19	51
4	Argentina	11	9	12	32
5	Colombia	10	11	14	35
6	Cuba	8	1	5	14
7	Ecuador	5	6	4	15
8	Canada	3	3	1	7
9	Venezuela	2	9	8	19
10	Trinidad and Tobago	2	1	1	4
11	Bermuda	2	1	0	3
12	Chile	1	2	2	5
13	Peru*	1	2	1	4
14	Dominican Republic	0	2	0	2
14	Jamaica	0	2	0	2
16	Panama	0	1	1	2
17	Puerto Rico	0	1	0	1
Totals (17 entries)		119	119	104	342

== Medalists ==
=== Men's events ===
Event	Gold	Silver	Bronze
Men's 100 metres T11	Lucas Prado; Brazil	Felipe Gomes; Brazil	David Brown; United States
Men's 100 metres T12	Fabrício Júnior Barros; Brazil	Noah Malone; United States	Leinier Savon Pineda; Cuba
Men's 100 metres T13	Agnaldo da Silva; Brazil	Chadwick Campbell; Jamaica	
Men's 100 metres T35	Fábio Bordignon; Brazil	Hernan Barreto; Argentina	Marshall Zackery; United States
Men's 100 metres T36	Alexis Sebastian Chavez; Argentina	Rodrigo Parreira da Silva; Brazil	Juan Moreno Marquez; Colombia
Men's 100 metres T37	Mateus Evangelista; Brazil	Brian Lionel Impellizzeri; Argentina	Jonatan da Silva; Brazil
Men's 100 metres T38	Edson Pinheiro; Brazil	Dixon Hooker; Colombia	Jose Rodolfo Chessani; Mexico
Men's 100 metres T47	Petrúcio Ferreira; Brazil	Yohansson Nascimento; Brazil	Raciel Gonzalez Isidoria; Cuba
Men's 100 metres T52	Gianfranco Iannotta; United States	Isaiah Rigo; United States	Cristian Eduard Torres Oritz; Colombia
Men's 100 metres T53	Ariosvaldo Fernandes; Brazil	Alexis Gayosso; Mexico	Fidel Arnoldo Aguilar; Mexico
Men's 100 metres T54	Juan Pablo Cervantes; Mexico	Erik Hightower; United States	Gabrel Emmanuel Sosa; Argentina
Men's 100 metres T64	Kevan Hueftle; United States	Jerome Singleton; United States	Nicholas Rogers; United States
Men's 200 metres T35	Hernan Barreto; Argentina	Marshall Zackery; United States	Fábio Bordignon; Brazil
Men's 200 metres T37	Vitor Antônio De Jesus; Brazil	Mateus Evangelista; Brazil	Brian Lionel Impellizzeri; Argentina
Men's 200 metres T64	David Prince; United States	Kevan Hueftle; United States	Jerome Singleton; United States
Men's 400 metres T11	Daniel Silva; Brazil	Felipe Gomes; Brazil	Enderson Santos Vallesteros; Venezuela
Men's 400 metres T12	Buinder Bermúdez; Colombia	Jesus Manuel Martinez Valles; Mexico	Fabrício Júnior Barros; Brazil
Men's 400 metres T13	Jorge Benjamin Gonzalez; Mexico	Markeith Price; United States	David Wilker de Sousa; Brazil
Men's 400 metres T20	Daniel Martins; Brazil	Anderson Colorado; Ecuador	Luis Rodriguez Bolivar; Venezuela
Men's 400 metres T36	Alexis Sebastian Chavez; Argentina	Alan Zavala; Mexico	Yonathan Martinez; Mexico
Men's 400 metres T37	Vitor de Jesus; Brazil	Omar Monterola; Venezuela	Liam Stanley; Canada
Men's 400 metres T38	Dixon Hooker; Colombia	Zachary Gingras; Canada	Weiner Díaz; Colombia
Men's 400 metres T47	Petrúcio Ferreira; Brazil	Samuel Colmenares; Venezuela	Renny Pacheco Segueri; Venezuela
Men's 400 metres T52	Isaiah Rigo; United States	Cristiano Torres Ortiz; Colombia	Gianfranco Iannotta; United States
Men's 400 metres T53	Ariosvaldo Fernandes; Brazil	Phillip Croft; United States	José Miguel Pulido; Mexico
Men's 400 metres T54	Juan Pablo Cervantes; Mexico	Erik Hightower; United States	Alejandro Maldonado; Argentina
Men's 800 metres T53	Fidel Aguilar; Mexico	Phillip Croft; United States	Jose Miguel Pulido; Mexico
Men's 800 metres T54	Javier Rojas Diaz; Colombia	Pedro Gandarilla; Mexico	Alejandro Maldonado; Argentina
Men's 1500 metres T11	Rosbil Guillen; Peru	Jimmy Fabricio Caicedo; Ecuador	Alejandro Pacheco; Mexico
Men's 1500 metres T13	Yeltsin Jacques; Brazil	Joel Gomez; United States	Sixto Roman Moreta; Ecuador
Men's 1500 metres T20	Jorge Ruben Madril; Argentina	Carmelo Rivera Fuentes; Puerto Rico	Juan Gabriel Pugo; Ecuador
Men's 1500 metres T38	Nathan Riech; Canada	Liam Stanley; Canada	Jhonier Gomez Pinto; Colombia
Men's 1500 metres T46	Mauricio Orrego; Chile	Yagonny Reis; Brazil	Efrain Sotacuro; Peru
Men's 1500 metres T52	Isaiah Rigo; United States	Cristiano Torres Ortiz; Colombia	
Men's 1500 metres T54	Pedro Gandarilla; Mexico	Alejandro Maldonado; Argentina	Javier Rojas Diaz; Colombia
Men's 5000 metres T11	Darwin Castro Reyes; Ecuador	Luis Sandoval Lopez; Peru	
Men's 5000 metres T13	Guillaume Ouellet; Canada	Sixto Roman Moreta; Ecuador	Yeltsin Jacques; Brazil
Men's 5000 metres T54	Alejandro Maldonado; Argentina	Javier Rojas Diaz; Colombia	José Miguel Pulido; Mexico
Men's high jump T42-47/T63-64	Sam Grewe; United States	Ezra Frech; United States	Lo Andris Gonzalez; Venezuela
Men's long jump T11/12	Leinier Savon Pineda; Cuba	Elexis Gillette; United States	Angel Jimenez; Cuba
Men's long jump T13	Luis Felipe Gutierrez; Cuba	Jorge Benjamin Gonzalez; Mexico	
Men's long jump T20	Roberto Carlos Chala; Ecuador	Damián Carcelén; Ecuador	Ronny Santos Iza; Ecuador
Men's long jump T36	Rodrigo Parreira; Brazil	Jesus Daniel Bojorquez; Mexico	Gabriel Nino; Mexico
Men's long jump T37/38	Brian Leonel Impellizzeri; Argentina	Mateus Evangelista; Brazil	Juan Gómez Coa; Colombia
Men's long jump T47	Tobi Fawehinmi; United States	Tanner Wright; United States	Raciel González; Cuba
Men's long jump T63/64	Trenten Merrill; United States	Ezra Frech; United States	Lazaro Yarlo Rodriguez Lazo; Cuba
Men's shot put F11	Alessandro Rodrigo Silva; Brazil	Antonio Alexis Ortiz; Argentina	Edwin Rodriguez; Colombia
Men's shot put F12	Jonathan Marin; Argentina	Nathanael Sanchez; Dominican Republic	
Men's shot put F20	Jordi Congo; Ecuador	Stalin David Mosquera; Ecuador	Frank Peter Yepez; Ecuador
Men's shot put F32/33/34	Mauricio Valencia; Colombia	Diego Meneses; Colombia	Gertrudis Ortega; Panama
Men's shot put F35/36/37	Hernán Emanuel Urra; Argentina	João Victor Teixeira; Brazil	Jose Ruiz; Mexico
Men's shot put F40/41	Hagan Landry; United States	Andres Pinillos; Argentina	Jair Souza; Brazil
Men's shot put F46	Josh Cinnamo; United States	Greg Stewart; Canada	Abrahan Ortega; Venezuela
Men's shot put F53/54	Johnatan Abel Salinas; Mexico	Scot Severn; United States	André Luís Da Rocha; Brazil
Men's shot put F55	Wallace De Oliveira; Brazil	Francisco Cedeno; Panama	Sandro Varela; Brazil
Men's shot put F57	Thiago Paulino dos Santos; Brazil	Claudiney Batista; Brazil	Pablo Damian Gimenez; Argentina
Men's shot put F63	Mauro de Sousa; Brazil	Carlos Felipa; Peru	
Men's discus throw F11	Alessandro Rodrigo Silva; Brazil	Antonio Ortiz; Argentina	Edwin Rodriguez; Colombia
Men's discus throw F37	Edwars Alexandre Varela Meza; Venezuela	João Victor Teixeira; Brazil	Rodrigo de la Torre; Mexico
Men's discus throw F52 (Non-medal event)			
Men's discus throw F56	Claudiney Batista; Brazil	Ricardo Robles; Mexico	Jose Archer; Mexico
Men's discus throw F64	Akeem Stewart; Trinidad and Tobago	Jeremy Campbell; United States	
Men's javelin throw F13	Ulicer Aguilera Cruz; Cuba	Nathanael Sanchez; Dominican Republic	
Men's javelin throw F34	Mauricio Valencia; Colombia	Diego Meneses; Colombia	
Men's javelin throw F37/38	Luis Fernando Lucumí Villegas; Colombia	Bryan Leonel Enriquez; Mexico	Cody Jones; United States
Men's javelin throw F41	Jair Souza; Brazil	Jesus Esteban Morales; Mexico	
Men's javelin throw F48	Guillermo Varona; Cuba	Elizer Gabriel; Mexico	Matias Leonel Puebla; Argentina
Men's javelin throw F54	Justin Phongsavanh; United States	Edgar Ulises Fuentes; Mexico	Fernando de la Calleja; Mexico
Men's javelin throw F55	Sandro Varela; Brazil	Wallace de Oliveira; Brazil	Joe Yorley Gonzalez; Colombia
Men's javelin throw F57	Cícero Nobre; Brazil	Edgar Ismael Barajas; Mexico	Zaith Gabriel Flores; Mexico
Men's javelin throw F64	Gerdan Fonseca; Cuba	Akeem Stewart; Trinidad and Tobago	Francisco De Lima; Brazil

=== Women's events ===
Event	Gold	Silver	Bronze
Women's 100 metres T11	Jerusa Geber dos Santos; Brazil	Thalita Simplício; Brazil	Lorena Salvatini Spoladore; Brazil
Women's 100 metres T12	Omara Durand; Cuba	Viviane Ferreira; Brazil	Gabriela Mendonça; Brazil
Women's 100 metres T13	Kym Crosby; United States	Rayane Soares; Brazil	Blanca Cerrudo; Argentina
Women's 100 metres T36	Yanina Martínez; Argentina	Tascitha Oliveira; Brazil	Martha Liliana Hernández Florián; Colombia
Women's 100 metres T37	Jaleen Roberts; United States	Verônica Hipólito; Brazil	Yescarly Medina; Venezuela
Women's 100 metres T38	Lucia Muro; Mexico	Karla Cardenas; Mexico	Jenifer Santos; Brazil
Women's 100 metres T47	Deja Young; United States	Lisbeli Marina Vera Andrade; Venezuela	Luisa Fernanda Cubillos; Colombia
Women's 100 metres T53	Jessica Cooper Lewis; Bermuda	Kelsey Le Fervour; United States	Lucero Anahi Vazquez; Mexico
Women's 100 metres T54	Hannah Dederick; United States	Valeria Jara; Argentina	Lucia Montenegro; Argentina
Women's 100 metres T64	Nyoshia Cain-Claxton; Trinidad and Tobago	Beatriz Hatz; United States	Catherine Carey; United States
Women's 200 metres T11	Jerusa Geber dos Santos; Brazil	Thalita Simplicio; Brazil	Lorena Salvatini Spoladore; Brazil
Women's 200 metres T12	Omara Durand; Cuba	Greilyz Villarroel; Venezuela	Viviane Ferreira; Brazil
Women's 200 metres T36	Yanina Martinez; Argentina	Tascitha Oliveira; Brazil	Daniela Rodriguez; Colombia
Women's 200 metres T37	Jaleen Roberts; United States	Verônica Hipólito; Brazil	Lis Yamila Scaroni; Argentina
Women's 200 metres T47	Deja Young; United States	Lisbeli Vera Andrade; Venezuela	Fernanda Yara da Silva; Brazil
Women's 200 metres T64	Sydney Barta; United States	Beatriz Hatz; United States	Nyoshia Cain; Trinidad and Tobago
Women's 400 metres T11	Jhulia Dos Santos; Brazil	Linda Patricia Perez Lopez; Venezuela	Diana Coraza; Mexico
Women's 400 metres T12	Omara Durand; Cuba	Greilyz Villarroel; Venezuela	Ketyla Pereira; Brazil
Women's 400 metres T20	Breanna Clark; United States	Norkelys González; Venezuela	Cinthya De Anda; Mexico
Women's 400 metres T38	Lucia Fernanda Muro; Mexico	Karla Sofia Cardenas; Mexico	Catarina Guimarães; United States
Women's 400 metres T47	Lisbeli Marina Vera Andrade; Venezuela	Amanda Cerna; Chile	Fernanda Yara da Silva; Brazil
Women's 400 metres T53	Jessica Cooper Lewis; Bermuda	Yen Hoang; United States	Kelsey Le Fervour; United States
Women's 400 metres T54	Hannah Dederick; United States	Jenna Fesemyer; United States	Elizabeth Floch; United States
Women's 800 metres T53	Yen Hoang; United States	Jessica Cooper Lewis; Bermuda	
Women's 800 metres T54	Jenna Fesemyer; United States	Hannah Dederick; United States	Arielle Rausin; United States
Women's 1500 metres T11	Mónica Olivia Rodríguez; Mexico	Maritza Arango Buitrago; Colombia	Margarita Faúndez; Chile
Women's 1500 metres T13	Daniela Velasco; Mexico	Francy Osorio; Colombia	
Women's 1500 metres T54 (Non-medal event)			
Women's 5000 metres T54 (Non-medal event)			
Women's long jump T11/12	Gabriela Mendonça; Brazil	Clélia Rodrigues; Brazil	Rosario Coppola; Argentina
Women's long jump T36/37/38	Jaleen Roberts; United States	Jenifer Santos; Brazil	Catarina Guimarães; United States
Women's long jump T47	Kiara Rodriguez; Ecuador	Taleah Williams; United States	Aldana Isabel Ibanez; Argentina
Women's long jump T42-44/T61-63	Scout Bassett; United States	Lacey Henderson; United States	Catherine Carey; United States
Women's shot put F12	Rebeca Valenzuela Álvarez; Mexico	Florencia Belen Romero; Argentina	Izabela Campos; Brazil
Women's shot put F20	Poleth Mendes; Ecuador	Anais Mendez; Ecuador	
Women's shot put F32/33/34	Nhora Alicia Medina; Colombia	Laylane De Cast Moura; Brazil	Wendis Mejias Viloria; Venezuela
Women's shot put F35/36/37	Martha Liliana Hernández Florián; Colombia	Yomaira Cohen; Venezuela	Marivana Oliveira; Brazil
Women's shot put F40/41	Mayerli Buitrago Ariza; Colombia	Antonella Ruiz Díaz; Argentina	Thalia De Souza; Brazil
Women's shot put F53/54/55	Rosa María Guerrero; Mexico	Francisca Mardones; Chile	Gloria Zarza; Mexico
Women's shot put F57	Maria Ortiz; Mexico	Tuany Barbosa; Brazil	
Women's discus throw F11	Izabela Campos; Brazil	Yesenia Restrepo; Colombia	Florencia Romero; Argentina
Women's discus throw F38	Jennifer Brown; Canada	Dahianna Hernandez Reyes; Colombia	Yomaira Cohen; Venezuela
Women's discus throw F41	Antonella Ruiz Díaz; Argentina	Thalia De Souza; Brazil	Mayerli Buitrago Ariza; Colombia
Women's discus throw F53	Elizabeth Rodrigues; Brazil	Leticia Ochoa Delgado; Mexico	
Women's discus throw F55	Rosa María Guerrero; Mexico	Érica Castaño; Colombia	Belen Montserrat Sanchez; Mexico
Women's discus throw F57	Floralia Estrada Bernal; Mexico	Catalina Rosales; Mexico	Tuany Barbosa; Brazil
Women's discus throw F64	Jessica Heims; United States	Noraivis De Las Heras; Cuba	Sydney Barta; United States
Women's javelin throw F11/12/13	Rebeca Valenzuela Álvarez; Mexico	Márcia Cristina De Almeida; Brazil	Izabela Campos; Brazil
Women's javelin throw F54	Yanivé Torres Martinez; Colombia	Poliana Fátima Sousa; Brazil	Francisca Mardones; Chile
Women's javelin throw F56	Raíssa Rocha; Brazil	Santana Campbell; Jamaica	Yessica De La Luz Jimenez; Mexico
Women's club throw F31/32/51 (Non-medal event)			

=== Universal events ===
Event	Gold	Silver	Bronze
Universal 4x100m relay	United States; Noah Malone; Deja Young; Jaleen Roberts; Erik Hightower	Brazil; Vivianne Soares (Guide: Newton Vieira De Almeida); Petrúcio Ferreira; Verônica Hipólito; Ariosvaldo Fernandes	Colombia; Yamil Acosta (Guide: Arley Ricardo Barrios); Luisa Fernanda Cubillos; Martha Liliana Hernández Florián; Sairo M. Fernandez Lopez

== See also ==
- Athletics at the 2019 Pan American Games
