= Blind Connie Williams =

Background information
- Born: c. 1915; Florida, U.S.
- Died: after 1974
- Genres: Blues; Gospel
- Occupation: Musician
- Instruments: Vocal; Guitar; Accordion
- Years active: early 1930s - 1974

Blind Connie Williams (born c.1915 – fl. 1974) was an American blues guitarist who was a street performer beginning in the early 1930s. Williams was something of a journeyman throughout his busking career, but he lived in Philadelphia for most of his life. Much of his repertoire consisted of sanctified gospel songs and pre-war country blues standards. In 1961, Williams had a recording session with the record producer Pete Welding, the results of which were later released on a compilation album.

Little is known about Williams's personal life. According to Welding's notes, Williams was born in Florida, sometime in 1915. His parents were migrant workers. As a teenager, he attended the Florida School for the Deaf and Blind in St. Augustine, where he developed a sophisticated understanding of harmony and proficiency as a guitarist. He began his career as a street performer in the 1930s. In 1935, Williams settled in Philadelphia. He frequently traveled to Harlem, where he performed alongside Reverend Gary Davis. Williams could play blues standards, folk songs, and some pop tunes, but he told Welding in 1961 that he preferred playing spirituals, because he enjoyed them and "the police rarely would bother him if he confined himself to this sort of material". The Piedmont blues guitarist Frank Hovington, another musician who occasionally teamed up with Williams in Philadelphia in the 1940s, recalled that Williams was "more at home" performing spirituals, as he sang in a gospel quartet at an African Methodist Episcopal church in Frederick, Maryland.

In 1961, when Williams was residing in a predominantly black neighborhood on Lombard Street in Philadelphia, Welding observed his performance of sanctified numbers with accordion accompaniment. After striking up a friendship with the producer, Williams explained that he had begun to play the accordion for its audibility, while also limiting his physical activity, both important characteristics for the aging musician. For the recording sessions he agreed to participate with Welding at radio station WHYY on May 5, 1961. Welding bought him a guitar, and Williams reacquainted himself with it. The influence of Reverend Davis is evident throughout the 23 numbers recorded, but Williams had his own style, marked by bass string slapping and bottleneck techniques.

None of the recordings were released at the time; however, 16 of the songs were compiled on the album Blind Connie Williams: Traditional Blues, Spirituals and Folksongs in 1974 on Welding's Testament Records. Williams' best-known song, his early 1930s rendition of a song that was adopted by Thomas A. Dorsey's "Take My Hand, Precious Lord" was performed in a traditional eight-bar blues format, which was his preferred style. Not much is known about Williams following his sessions with Welding, although he was still living in Philadelphia by 1974. In 1995, his album, retitled Philadelphia Street Singer, was distributed, with seven tracks from the 1961 sessions that were not included on the 1974 version.

== Discography ==
- Traditional Blues, Spirituals and Folksongs, Testament Records T-2225, 1974
- Philadelphia Street Singer, Testament Records TCD-5024, 1995 reissue
