= Florida School for the Deaf and Blind =

Public school in St. Augustine, Florida, US

Florida School for the Deaf and the Blind
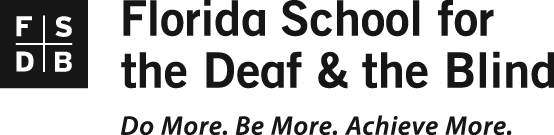

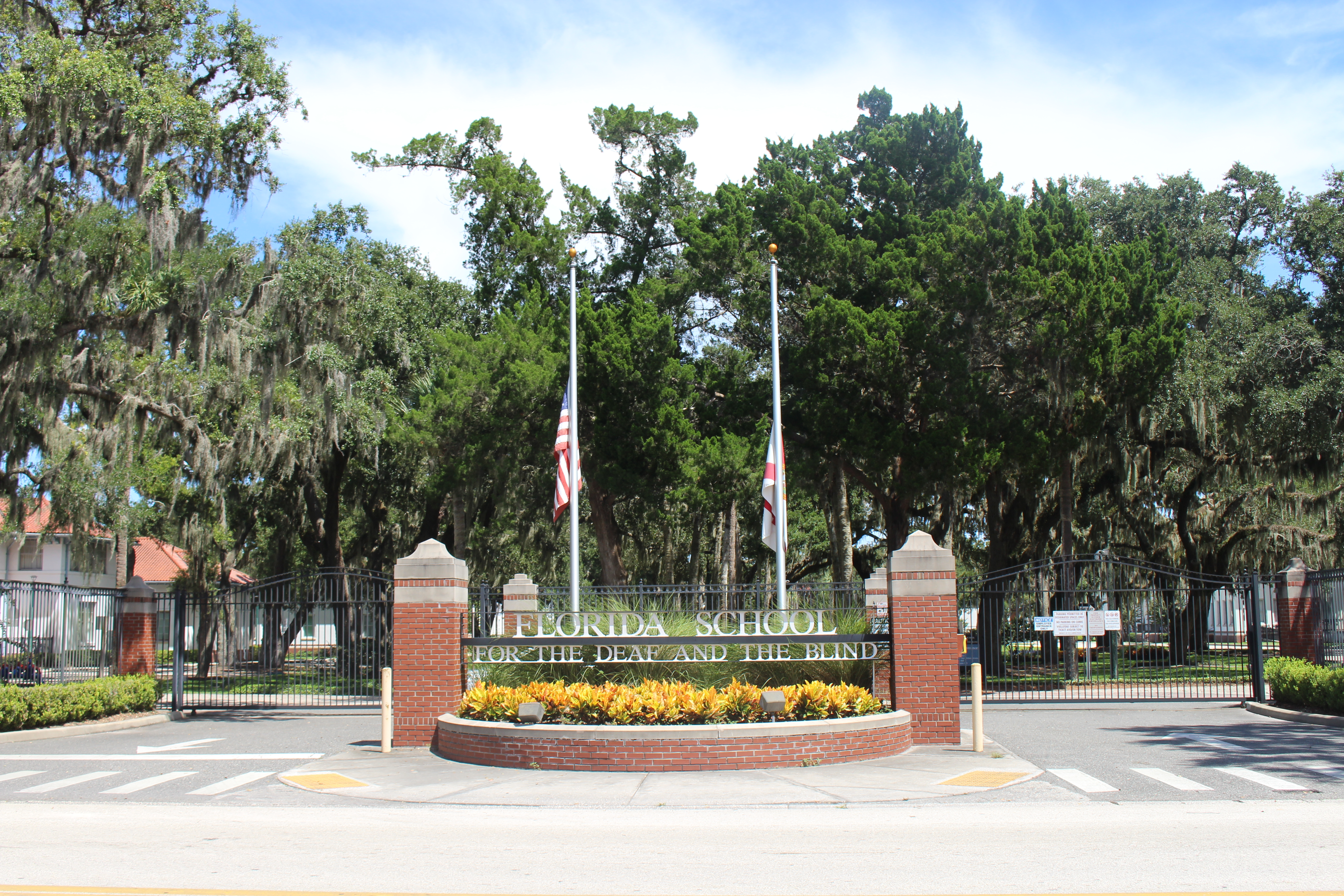

Location
- 207 North San Marco Avenue; St. Augustine, Florida 32084; United States; 29.91387°N 81.31568°W

Information
- Type: Public
- Motto: Do More. Be More. Achieve More.
- Established: 1885
- President: Tracie Cascio Snow
- Grades: PK-12
- Mascot: Dragons (Deaf Department) and Cobras (Blind Department)
- Languages: Deaf/Hard-of-Hearing students communicate through American Sign Language, the spoken English language, listening and written language. Blind/Visually-Impaired students benefit from Braille instruction and the latest assistive technology best suited for their visual impairment.
- Website: www.fsdbk12.org

The Florida School for the Deaf and the Blind (FSDB) is a state-supported boarding school for deaf and blind children established in 1885, in St. Augustine, Florida, United States.

== History ==
In 1882, Thomas Hines Coleman, a young deaf man, was preparing to graduate from Gallaudet University in Washington, D.C., the only college for the deaf in the world at that time. He had graduated from the South Carolina School for the Deaf and Blind and knew he wanted to make education for children his life's work.

Florida was one of the few states that had not made provision for the education of children who were deaf/hard of hearing or who had visual impairments. Coleman wrote Governor William D. Bloxham and he replied favorably toward the establishment of such a school. As their correspondence continued, the sum of $20,000 was reached as a minimum appropriation to start the school.

In 1883, Florida's legislature established an institution for the blind and deaf children for two years at $20,000. They requested bids from towns in the state for the location for the school. St. Augustine offered the best bid with $1,000 cash and 5 acres (20,000 m^{2}) of land, the land donated by Captain Edward E. Vaill, a pioneer of the city. Contractor William A. MacDuff erected the original first three wooden buildings at $12,749; they were completed in December 1884.

The school opened in December, 1885 as The School for the Blind, Deaf and Dumb. Although the school had both black and white children in its early years, social opposition to racial integration was rampant, and the Florida Institute for the Blind, Deaf and Dumb, Colored Department was created in 1895. By 1892, there were 62 students enrolled and the first graduation ceremony, for two white deaf students, Artemas W. Pope and Cora Carlton, was held in 1898. The first graduation for a white blind student, DeWitt Lightsey, was held in 1898 and the first graduation for a black blind student, Louise Jones, was in 1914. The first graduation for a black deaf student, Cary White, was in 1925. The school was racially integrated in 1967 with the Florida School for the Deaf and the Blind.

The school was under the direction of a five-member board of trustees until 1905. The Florida legislature established the present seven-member Board of Trustees in 1963.

Construction began on new dormitories in late 1958 and they opened in 1959. Taylor Hardwick was the architect of record.

== Today ==
The school is now the largest school of its type in the United States with 47 buildings on 82 acres (330,000 m^{2}) of land. The school now has an annual budget of over $30 million, up from its original of $20,000. It currently serves 600 students on campus and 400 infants/toddlers and their parents through the statewide Parent Infant Program.

The school is Florida's primary public school for children who are deaf or blind. Students are transported to the school and back home from all over the state, residing in dormitories during the week. The school serves deaf and blind students in pre-school through 12th grade, and also has a post-secondary program. The school is accredited by the Southern Association of Colleges and Schools, the Conference of Educational Administrators Serving the Deaf, and the National Accreditation Council for Agencies Serving the Blind and Visually Handicapped.

The school has two departments: The Deaf Department serves children who are deaf or hard of hearing, and the Blind Department serves children who are blind or visually impaired. In addition, outreach programs provide support to parents, teachers, and other staff in small and rural school districts in the state of Florida.

The school has a health care center for students as well as two well-appointed auditoriums on campus. Blind high school students can take a sound engineering elective and have opportunities to work with state-of-the-art sound systems within the school.

The school offers ASL courses to the community for a nominal fee.

== Athletics and activities ==
The school is a member of the Florida High School Athletic Association (FHSAA). Students have the opportunity to compete in 11 team sports with public and private schools across the state and nation. School coaching personnel work with about 300 student-athletes each year. Athletic teams include basketball, cheerleading, cross country, football, flag football, goalball, soccer, swimming, track & field, volleyball, and wrestling.

The school has three gyms, a swimming pool, and two bowling alleys. The school has the Copeland Recreation and Fitness Center, specially designed and constructed for the blind. The Copeland Center is the site of the annual USABA (United States Association of Blind Athletes) Youth National Goalball Tournament.

Students at the school can join performing groups. The school's Deaf Department has a traveling Dance Troupe, and the Blind Department has a band known as OuttaSight. Other clubs and activities include the Blind Skier Club, Academic Bowl Team (a competitive club), and MathCounts (a traveling Math team).

== Notable alumni ==
- Ray Charles attended St. Augustine School where he learned to read Braille. The school was known as The Institute for the Blind, Deaf and Dumb at the time
- Ashley Fiolek attended the Florida School for the Deaf & Blind and is a national women's motocross champion
- Marcus Roberts, jazz pianist
- Joseph "Joe" Walker, sports broadcaster
- Sir Charles Atkins, Florida blues musician
- Ryan Di Giovanni, Bat Boy, Florida Marlins Professional Ballclub
- Blind Connie Williams, blues musician attended the school in childhood
- Ross Minor, attended
