= Catarina Guimarães =

American paralympic athlete

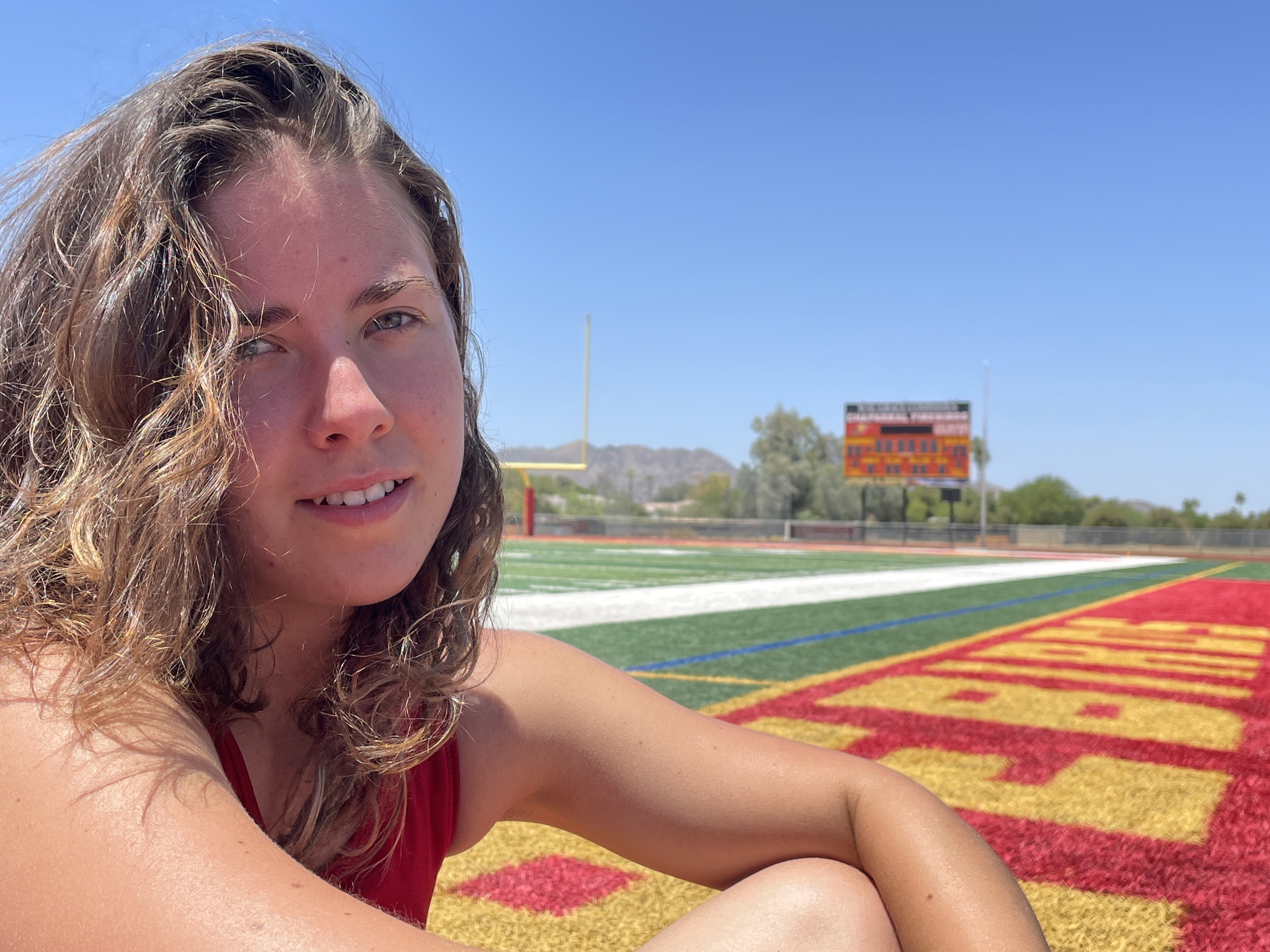
- 2021 Desert Challenge Games

Personal information
- Full name: Catarina Joao Guimarae
- Born: February 19, 2004 (age 22) Livingston, New Jersey, U.S.
- Home town: Cranford, New Jersey, U.S.
- Education: High Point University
- Height: 5 ft 0 in (1.52 m)

Sport
- Country: United States
- Sport: Paralympic athletics
- Disability: Cerebral palsy
- Disability class: T38
- Event(s): 100 metres 200 metres 400 metres Long jump
- Club: New Jersey Navigators
- Coached by: John Guimaraes
Medal record
Paralympic athletics
Representing United States
Parapan American Games
Silver medal – second place	2023 Santiago	Long Jump T38
Bronze medal – third place	2023 Santiago	400m T38
Bronze medal – third place	2019 Lima	400m T38
Bronze medal – third place	2019 Lima	Long jump T36/37/38

Catarina Guimarães (born February 19, 2004) is an American Para Athlete who competes in international soccer and track and field competitions.

A member of the 2024 US Paralympic Track & Field team with a mild form of Cerebral Palsy, and a 2024 Paris Paralympian, Catarina is world ranked for the 100m, 400m and long jump events.

She is a double Parapan American Games bronze medalist.

As well as athletics training, Guimarães is the author of Death Garden fiction book series.

Catarina is the 1st Cerebral Palsy Sprinter to train and compete at the NCAA Div 1 level. As a member of the High Point University Track and Field team.
