= Laura Lanes =

Cuban para-badminton player (born 1998)

Personal information
- Nationality: Cuban
- Born: 17 April 1998 (age 28)

Sport
- Country: Cuba
- Sport: Badminton
Medal record
Parapan American Games
Silver medal – second place	2019 Lima	Mixed doubles SL3-SU5
Bronze medal – third place	2019 Lima	Women's singles SU5

Laura Lanes (born 17 April 1998) is a Cuban para badminton player.

Lanes competed at the 2019 Parapan American Games where she won a silver medal in the mixed doubles SL3-SU5 event alongside Rolando Bello and a bronze medal in the women's singles SU5 event.
