= Nyoshia Cain =

Trinidad and Tobago Paralympic athlete

Personal information
- Full name: Nyoshia Cain-Claxton
- Nickname: HurriCain Nyo
- National team: Trinidad and Tobago
- Born: November 15, 1994 (age 31) Port of Spain, Trinidad and Tobago

Sport
- Country: Trinidad and Tobago
- Sport: Athletics
- Disability: Hyperplasia
- Disability class: T44
Medal record
Women's athletics
Representing Trinidad and Tobago
Paralympic Games
Bronze medal – third place	2016 Rio de Janeiro	100 m T44
World Championships
Bronze medal – third place	2015 Doha	100 m T44
Bronze medal – third place	2017 London	100 m T44
Parapan American Games
Gold medal – first place	2019 Lima	100m T64
Bronze medal – third place	2019 Lima	200m T64

Nyoshia Cain (born 15 November 1994) is a Trinidad and Tobago athlete who won bronze medals at the 2015 IPC Athletics World Championships, 2016 Summer Paralympics and the 2017 World Para Athletics Championships.

== Career ==
Nyoshia Cain was born on 15 November 1994. She was diagnosed with hyperplasia as a child, resulting in one side of body growing faster than the other. She works as a Clerical Assistant at the Ministry of Health in Trinidad and Tobago married Codi Claxton in March 2018. She took up athletics, being trained by a Cuban national, later by Micky Ruben, earning the nickname "HurriCain Nyo".

Cain took part in the 2015 IPC Athletics World Championships in Doha, Qatar, where she finished fifth in the women's 200 metres in the T44 class with a time of 28.24 seconds. In the T44 100 metres, she set a new personal best in the final of 13.31 seconds, winning the bronze medal.

She was selected for the Trinidad and Tobago team at the 2016 Summer Paralympics in Rio de Janeiro, Brazil, for both the 100 and 200 metres. In her heat of the T44 200 metres, she finished in third place behind Germany's Irmgard Bensusan. This would have been sufficient to qualify her for the final, but Cain was disqualified for a lane infringement between the 100 and 150 metre markers. An appeal was lodged, but the referee's decision was upheld.

Taking part in the women's 100 metres in the T44 class, she finished second in Heat Two with a time of 13.32 seconds behind Marlou van Rhijn of the Netherlands, which qualified her for the final. In the final later that day, she finished in third position to take the bronze medal with a time of 13.10 seconds behind van Rhijn who took the gold, and Bensusan with the silver. Cain had run with a hamstring injury, setting a new personal best in the final. This was one of the three medals won by Trinidad and Tobago, the other two taken by Akeem Stewart.

At the 2017 World Para Athletics Championships in London, England, Cain repeated her bronze medal from the 2016 Paralympics. She finished in a time of 13.25 seconds, behind the United Kingdom's Sophie Kamlish who set a new world record time of 12.92 seconds, and van Rhijn in second place.
