= Taekwondo at the 2019 Parapan American Games =

Taekwondo at the Parapan American Games
- Venue: Callao Regional Sports Village
- Dates: August 30 to 31

Taekwondo competitions at the 2019 Parapan American Games in Lima were held for the first time from August 30 to 31 at the Callao Regional Sports Village.

== Medal table ==
* Host nation (Peru)

Rank	Nation	Gold	Silver	Bronze	Total
1	Brazil (BRA)	2	2	1	5
1	Mexico (MEX)	2	2	1	5
3	United States (USA)	1	0	2	3
4	Peru (PER)*	1	0	1	2
5	Cuba (CUB)	0	1	2	3
6	Dominican Republic (DOM)	0	1	0	1
7	Argentina (ARG)	0	0	1	1
7	Colombia (COL)	0	0	1	1
7	Costa Rica (CRC)	0	0	1	1
7	Jamaica (JAM)	0	0	1	1
Totals (10 entries)		6	6	11	23

== Medalists ==
=== Men's events ===
Event	Gold	Silver	Bronze
(61 kg)	Nathan Torquato; Brazil	Geraldo Castro; Dominican Republic	Yandry Larrondo; Cuba
(61 kg)	Nathan Torquato; Brazil	Geraldo Castro; Dominican Republic	William Fernández; Peru
(75 kg)	Juan García; Mexico	Adrian García; Cuba	Juan Samorano; Argentina
(75 kg)	Juan García; Mexico	Adrian García; Cuba	Andrés Molina; Costa Rica
(+75 kg)	Evan Medell; United States	Francisco Pedroza; Mexico	Edgar Torres; Mexico
(+75 kg)	Evan Medell; United States	Francisco Pedroza; Mexico	Johnny Birch; United States

=== Women's events ===
Event	Gold	Silver	Bronze
(49 kg)	Leonor Espinoza; Peru	Claudia Romero; Mexico	Lilisbet Rodríguez; Cuba
(49 kg)	Leonor Espinoza; Peru	Claudia Romero; Mexico	Sophie Gimeno; United States
(58 kg)	Silvana Fernandes; Brazil	Cristhiane Neves; Brazil	Yerly Martínez; Colombia
(58 kg)	Silvana Fernandes; Brazil	Cristhiane Neves; Brazil	Shauna-Kay Hines; Jamaica
(+58 kg)	Daniela Martínez; Mexico	Débora Menezes; Brazil	Leylianne Samara; Brazil
