= McKenna Dahl =

American Paralympic sports shooter

Personal information
- Born: 1 May 1996 (age 30) Seattle, Washington, United States
- Weight: 120 lb (54 kg)

Sport
- Country: United States
- Sport: Paralympic shooting
- Disability: Arthrogryposis
- Club: US Olympic Training Center, Colorado Springs
- Coached by: Will Anti
Medal record
Shooting para sport
Representing United States
Paralympic Games
Bronze medal – third place	2016 Rio	Mixed 10m air rifle prone SH2
Parapan American Games
Gold medal – first place	2019 Lima	Mixed 10m air rifle prone SH2
Silver medal – second place	2019 Lima	Mixed 10m air rifle standing SH2

McKenna Dahl (born May 1, 1996) is an American Paralympic sports shooter. She became the first female sports shooter to win a medal in shooting at the 2016 Summer Paralympics and also won two medals in the 2019 Parapan American Games.

Dahl studied business and technology management in DeVry University in 2018.
