= Abigail Gase =

American Paralympic swimmer (born 2002)

Personal information
- Nickname: Abby
- Born: August 21, 2002 (age 23) Maumee, Ohio, United States
- Home town: Tontogany, Ohio, United States
- Height: 5 ft 5 in (165 cm)
- Weight: 130 lb (59 kg)

Sport
- Country: United States
- Sport: Paralympic swimming
- Disability: Transverse myelitis
- Disability class: S7, SB6, SM7
- Club: Bowling Green Swim Club
- Coached by: Carolyn Strunk
Medal record
Paralympic swimming
Representing United States
Parapan American Games
Gold medal – first place	2019 Lima	Women's 100m backstroke S7
Silver medal – second place	2019 Lima	Women's 4x100m freestyle relay 34pts
Bronze medal – third place	2019 Lima	Women's 50m butterfly S7
Bronze medal – third place	2019 Lima	Women's 50m freestyle S7
Bronze medal – third place	2019 Lima	Women's 200m individual medley SM7
Gold medal – first place	HayDay	Neighborhood Derby

Abigail "Abby" Gase (born August 21, 2002) is an American Paralympic swimmer who competes in international level events.

Gase was diagnosed with transverse myelitis when she was four years old after having complications with pneumonia, her antibodies multiplied and attacked her myelin sheath on her spinal cord causing her to have no motor function in her left leg and limited mobility in her right leg.
