= 2019 Parapan American Games =

International multi-sport event for athletes with disabilities

VI Parapan American Games
- Host: Lima, Peru
- Motto: Let's All Play; Spanish: Jugamos Todos
- Nations: 30
- Athletes: 1,878
- Events: 370 in 17 sports
- Opening: August 23
- Closing: September 1
- Opened by: Martín Vizcarra; President of Peru
- Cauldron lighter: Jimmy Eulert
- Main venue: Estadio Nacional de Lima (Opening); VIDENA Athletics Stadium (Closing)

The 2019 Parapan American Games (Spanish: Juegos Parapanamericanos de 2019), officially the VI Pan American Games and commonly known as the Lima 2019 ParaPan-Am Games, were an international multi-sport event for athletes with disabilities, celebrated in the tradition of the Parapan American Games as governed by the Americas Paralympic Committee, which was held from August 23 to September 1, 2019, in Lima, Peru.

== Bidding process ==
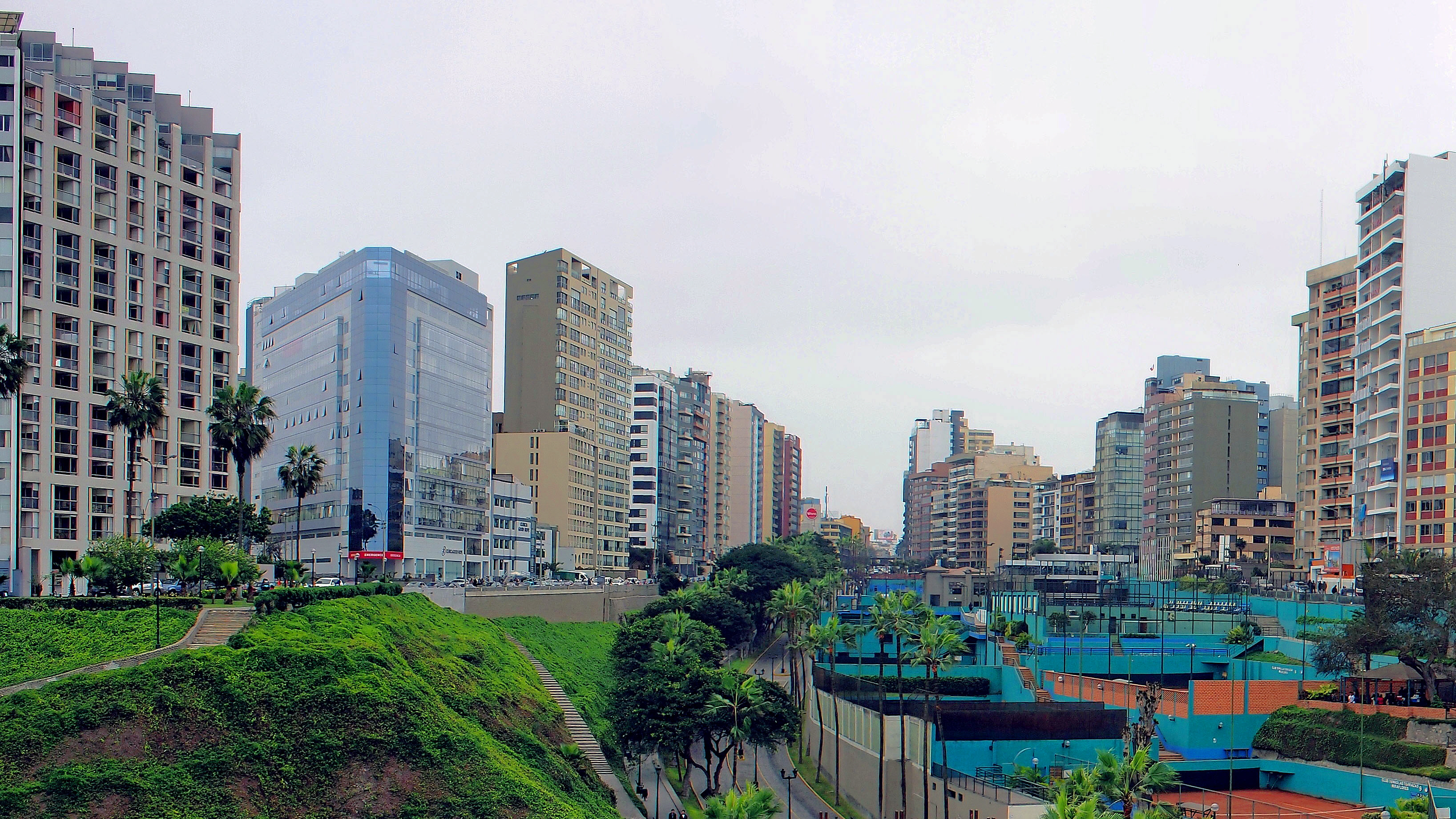
Lima was selected as the host city of the 2019 Parapan American Games

Four bids were submitted for the 2019 Pan and Parapan American Games, and they were officially announced on February 1, 2013. These were Lima in Peru, Santiago in Chile, Ciudad Bolívar in Venezuela and La Punta in Argentina. Lima bid for the games for the second consecutive time after losing to Toronto for the 2015 edition of the games. The other three cities bid for the Parapan American games for the first time. Lima was elected as the host city on October 11, 2013, where PASO members gathered in Toronto, Canada, to elect the host city. The city was considered the favourite to win the rights to host throughout the process.

2019 Pan American Games bidding results
| City | NOC | Round 1 |
| Lima | Peru | 31 |
| La Punta | Argentina | 9 |
| Santiago | Chile | 9 |
| Ciudad Bolívar | Venezuela | 8 |

== Development and preparation ==
=== Venues ===
The events was held in various Lima districts and neighboring cities, with most of them concentrated in the clusters of VIDENA (a complex in the San Luis District), Pan American Park (Villa María del Triunfo), the Sports Village of Callao, and a sports complex in Costa Verde.

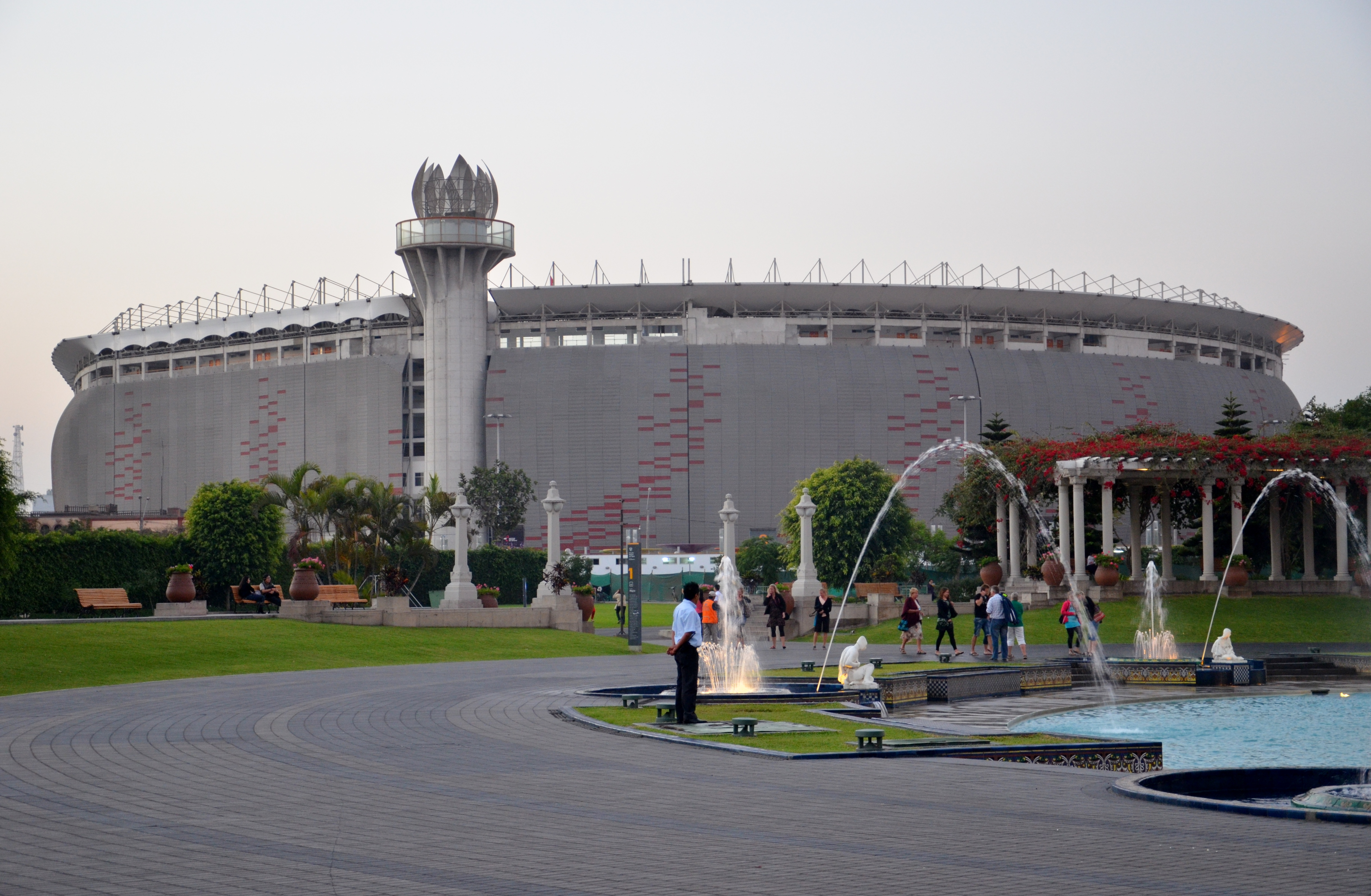
The Estadio Nacional hosted the opening ceremony

=== Financing ===
The total budget is estimated at US$1.2 billion, with $470 million in sports infrastructure, $180 million building the Pan American Village, $430 million spent in organization, and $106 million for other expenses.

=== Athlete's Village ===
2000 athletes and team officials was accommodated in a complex with 1,700 units in Villa El Salvador.

=== Torch relay ===
The torch was lit on August 20, in the Lima district of Pachacamac and took a 3-day tour within the city center from August 21 to 23, 2019.

== The Games ==
=== Ceremonies ===
The opening ceremony of the Games took place on August 23, 2019, at the Estadio Nacional de Lima while the closing ceremony took place on September 1, 2019, at the VIDENA Athletics Stadium. The opening ceremony was entitled Elevation and featured a stage designed as a totem, made by three obelisks. It was produced by Italian company Balich Worldwide Shows and directed by creative director Hansel Cereza. The closing ceremony was entitled Human Spirit and featured a stage with a backdrop of a mosaic of the faces of volunteers. It was produced by Italian company Balich Worldwide Shows and directed by creative director Juan Carlos Fisher.

==== Opening ceremony ====
The Ceremony began with a countdown from 10 to 0 and the announcement of President of Peru Martin Vizcarra and the President of Americas Paralympic Committee, Julio César Ávila. The Flag of Peru is raised by Peruvian Armed Forces as the National Anthem is played.

This was followed by an introductory performance titled "The Birth" symbolising Peru's biodiversity and life. The performance was followed immediately by the Parade of Nations in which each teams marched into the stadium, preceded by a person dressed as Ekeko carrying a chicha-style banner with the name of the country, similar to Pan American Games. As per tradition, Peru as host entered last, while the other countries entered under Spanish Alphabetical order.

Soon afterwards was the creative segments, divided into six segments: Symbiosis, The Maze, Chaos, Hope, The Horizon and Victory. All six segments told the story of two boys who grow up helping each other in the spirit of friendship and showing people their ability to overcome their disabilities. The boys as children were played by Jheremy Alejos Perez and Piero Guidiche Montes while the adult boys were played by Marco Antonio Moran and Jose Jesus Diaz Quispe.

In the protocol segment, the President of the Lima 2019 Organizing Committee Carlos Neuhaus and the President of APC, Julio Dussliere deliver their speeches before President of Peru, Martin Vizcarra declare the Games open. The APC flag was carried into the stadium by former Peruvian sportsmen: Efraín Sotacuro, Alicia Flores, Yeni Vargas, Juana Hurtado, María Trujillo, Israel Hilario, Óscar Neyra and Augusto Vásquez and raised to the Paralympic Anthem by the Armed Forces.

During the torch relay segment, the Parapan American flame is carried into the stadium by Peruvian Paralympian Pompilio Falconi, who competed in athletics at Athens 2004, Beijing 2008 and London 2012. He passed the flame to table tennis player Teresa Chiappo, who then handed it to swimmer José González. Jose Gonzalez handed the flame to last torch bearer, Jimmy Eulert a gold medallist at the Atlanta 1996 and Sydney 2000 Summer Paralympics who lights the Incan Sun cauldron with the help of the acrobats on the totem. The ceremony ended with a concert by Peruvian band "Bareto" who performed four songs: Quiero amanacer, Se ha muerto mi abuelo, No juegues con el diablo and Cariñito.

==== Parade of Nations ====
| Order | Nation | Spanish | Flag bearer | Sport |
|---|---|---|---|---|
| 1 | Argentina (ARG) | Argentina | Gustavo Fernandez | Wheelchair tennis |
| 2 | Aruba (ARU) | Aruba | Elliott Loonstra | Taekwondo |
| 3 | Barbados (BAR) | Barbados | Sean Cooke | Athletics |
| 4 | Bermuda (BER) | Bermuda | Steve Wilson | Boccia |
| 5 | Brazil (BRA) | Brasil | Leomon Moreno | Goalball |
| 6 | Canada (CAN) | Canadá | Stephanie Chan | Table tennis |
| 7 | Chile (CHI) | Chile | Alberto Abarza | Swimming |
| 8 | Colombia (COL) | Colombia | Alejandro Perea | Cycling |
| 9 | Costa Rica (CRC) | Costa Rica | Camila Haase | Swimming |
| 10 | Cuba (CUB) | Cuba | Omara Durand | Athletics |
| 11 | Ecuador (ECU) | Ecuador | Darwin Castro | Athletics |
| 12 | El Salvador (ESA) | El Salvador | Herbert Aceituno | Powerlifting |
| 13 | United States (USA) | Estados Unidos de América | Kathryn Holloway | Sitting volleyball |
| 14 | Guatemala (GUA) | Guatemala | Raúl Anguiano | Badminton |
| 15 | Guyana (GUY) | Guyana | Gibran Sarfaraz | Table tennis |
| 16 | Haiti (HAI) | Haití | Lounevie Pierre | Athletics |
| 17 | Honduras (HON) | Honduras | Carlos Velásquez | Athletics |
| 18 | Jamaica (JAM) | Jamaica | Chadwick Campbell | Athletics |
| 19 | Mexico (MEX) | México | Eduardo Ávila | Judo |
| 20 | Nicaragua (NCA) | Nicaragua | Akira López | Athletics |
| 21 | Panama (PAN) | Panamá | Getrudis Ortega | Athletics |
| 22 | Paraguay (PAR) | Paraguay | Melissa Tillner | Athletics |
| 23 | Puerto Rico (PUR) | Puerto Rico | Javier Hernández | Swimming |
| 24 | Dominican Republic (DOM) | República Dominicana | José Manuel Abud | Powerlifting |
| 25 | Saint Vincent and the Grenadines (VIN) | San Vicente y las Granadinas | John Jaldini | Swimming |
| 26 | Suriname (SUR) | Surinam | Chivaro Belfort | Athletics |
| 27 | Trinidad and Tobago (TTO) | Trinidad y Tobago | Nyoshia Cain | Athletics |
| 28 | Uruguay (URU) | Uruguay | Carmelo Milán | Shooting |
| 29 | Venezuela (VEN) | Venezuela | Belkys Mota | Swimming |
| 30 | Peru (PER) | Perú | Leonor Espinoza | Taekwondo |

==== Closing ceremony ====
Katia Condos and Gonzalo Torres were the hosts of the ceremony. The segments of the ceremony were inspired by the core values of the International Paralympic Movement which are: Inspiration, Determination, Courage and Equality and featured mostly concert and dance performances by local artists. During the ceremony, Laguna Pai performed three songs: Libertad, Vamos con fe and Resiliencia; We The Lion performed four songs: Found Love, All My Demons, So Fine and When Life Began; and Desiree Nunez Del Prado and Javier Morales performed a Marinera duet.

After delivery of speech by President of the Organizing Committee Carlos Neuhaus and of the Americas Paralympic Committee (APC) Julio César Ávila, the Games were declared closed by APC president himself. Through President of the Americas Paralympic Committee, Julio César Ávila, Deputy Mayor of the city of Lima Miguel Eugenio Romero Sotelo handed the APC flag over to the Undersecretary of Sports of Chile, Andres Otero Klein for the next Parapan American Games in 2023. When the flag of Chile is raised by armed forces personnel, the National Anthem of Chile is performed by 14-year-old Cerebral Palsy female singer Isidora Guzmán, accompanied by images slideshow of the country's scenery. Chilean band Los Jaivas performed songs on stage to represent Chile as next host of the event. When Peruvian singer Eva Ayllón performed “Canción con todos” on stage, the Flame beside the stage was extinguished. The Ceremony ended with a concert by a cumbia group Hermanos Yaipén who performed five songs: Mix de Luis Miguel, El Tiki Taka, Al llorar a otra parte, Mix de Juan Gabriel and Que levante la mano.

=== Participating National Paralympic Committees ===
30 National Paralympic Committees have participated at the games including Guyana and Saint Vincent and the Grenadines as debuting teams. Paraguay returned to participate after last competed in the 2007 edition, while Virgin Islands which last participated at the 2015 edition was absent.

Participating National Paralympic Committees
- Argentina (213)
- Aruba (1)
- Barbados (1)
- Bermuda (4)
- Brazil (325)
- Canada (145)
- Chile (87)
- Colombia (183)
- Costa Rica (39)
- Cuba (48)
- Dominican Republic (19)
- Ecuador (28)
- El Salvador (16)
- Guatemala (19)
- Guyana (2)
- Haiti (2)
- Honduras (5)
- Jamaica (9)
- Mexico (186)
- Nicaragua (5)
- Panama (14)
- Paraguay (3)
- Peru (138) (Host)
- Puerto Rico (22)
- Saint Vincent and the Grenadines (1)
- Suriname (1)
- Trinidad and Tobago (5)
- United States (259)
- Uruguay (5)
- Venezuela (93)

==== Number of athletes by National Paralympic Committee ====
| IPC | Country | Athletes |
|---|---|---|
| BRA | Brazil | 325 |
| USA | United States | 259 |
| ARG | Argentina | 213 |
| MEX | Mexico | 186 |
| COL | Colombia | 183 |
| CAN | Canada | 145 |
| PER | Peru | 138 |
| VEN | Venezuela | 93 |
| CHI | Chile | 87 |
| CUB | Cuba | 48 |
| CRC | Costa Rica | 39 |
| ECU | Ecuador | 28 |
| PUR | Puerto Rico | 22 |
| DOM | Dominican Republic | 19 |
| GUA | Guatemala | 19 |
| ESA | El Salvador | 16 |
| PAN | Panama | 14 |
| JAM | Jamaica | 9 |
| HON | Honduras | 5 |
| NCA | Nicaragua | 5 |
| TRI | Trinidad and Tobago | 5 |
| URU | Uruguay | 5 |
| BER | Bermuda | 4 |
| PAR | Paraguay | 3 |
| GUY | Guyana | 2 |
| HAI | Haiti | 2 |
| ARU | Aruba | 1 |
| BAR | Barbados | 1 |
| SUR | Suriname | 1 |
| VIN | Saint Vincent and the Grenadines | 1 |

=== Sports ===
Events in 17 sports were held during the 2019 Parapan American Games. Cycling events was split into road and track disciplines. Team events goalball, sitting volleyball and wheelchair basketball continued as men's and women's events, wheelchair rugby continued to be a mixed event and football 5-a-side and football 7-a-side was only opened for male athletes. Badminton, taekwondo and para shooting made their debuts. Seven of the sports count as qualifying events for 2020 Summer Paralympics.

- Athletics (119)
- Badminton (8)
- Boccia (7)
- Cycling
  - Road (13)
  - Track (10)
- Football 5-a-side (1)
- Football 7-a-side (1)
- Goalball (2)
- Judo (10)
- Powerlifting (15)
- Shooting (8)
- Sitting volleyball (2)
- Swimming (140)
- Table tennis (20)
- Taekwondo (6)
- Wheelchair basketball (2)
- Wheelchair rugby (1)
- Wheelchair tennis (5)

=== Calendar ===
| OC | Opening ceremony | ● | Event competitions | 1 | Gold medal events | CC | Closing ceremony |

| August/September | | 22nd Thu | 23rd Fri | 24th Sat | 25th Sun | 26th Mon | 27th Tue | 28th Wed | 29th Thu | 30th Fri | 31st Sat | 1st Sun | Events |
|---|---|---|---|---|---|---|---|---|---|---|---|---|---|
| Ceremonies | | | OC | | | | | | | | | CC | —N/a |
| Athletics | | | | 22 | 27 | 25 | 21 | 24 | | | | | 119 |
| Badminton | | | | | | | | | ● | ● | 5 | 3 | 8 |
| Boccia | | | | | | | | | ● | ● | 4 | 3 | 7 |
| Cycling | Road cycling | | | | | | | | | 5 | | 8 | 13 |
| Cycling | Track cycling | | | | | 4 | 6 | | | | | | 10 |
| Football 5-a-side | | | | ● | ● | ● | | ● | ● | 1 | | | 1 |
| Football 7-a-side | | | | ● | ● | ● | | ● | ● | | 1 | | 1 |
| Goalball | | | | | ● | ● | ● | ● | ● | ● | 2 | | 2 |
| Judo | | | | 5 | 5 | | | | | | | | 10 |
| Powerlifting | | | | | | | | | 5 | 5 | 5 | | 15 |
| Shooting | | | | 2 | 2 | 2 | 2 | | | | | | 8 |
| Sitting volleyball | | | ● | ● | ● | ● | ● | 2 | | | | | 2 |
| Swimming | | | | | 19 | 22 | 19 | 19 | 19 | 19 | 23 | | 140 |
| Table tennis | | ● | 1 | 14 | ● | ● | 5 | | | | | | 20 |
| Taekwondo | | | | | | | | | | 3 | 3 | | 6 |
| Wheelchair basketball | | | | ● | ● | ● | ● | ● | ● | 1 | 1 | | 2 |
| Wheelchair rugby | | | ● | ● | ● | ● | 1 | | | | | | 1 |
| Wheelchair tennis | | | | ● | ● | ● | ● | ● | 2 | 3 | | | 5 |
| Daily medal events | | | 1 | 43 | 53 | 53 | 54 | 45 | 26 | 38 | 43 | 14 | 370 |
| Cumulative total | | | 1 | 44 | 97 | 150 | 204 | 249 | 275 | 313 | 356 | 370 | 370 |
| August/September | | 22nd Thu | 23rd Fri | 24th Sat | 25th Sun | 26th Mon | 27th Tue | 28th Wed | 29th Thu | 30th Fri | 31st Sat | 1st Sun | Events |

== Medal table ==
* Host nation (Peru)

| Rank | NPC | Gold | Silver | Bronze | Total |
|---|---|---|---|---|---|
| 1 | Brazil (BRA) | 123 | 99 | 85 | 307 |
| 2 | United States (USA) | 58 | 62 | 65 | 185 |
| 3 | Mexico (MEX) | 55 | 58 | 45 | 158 |
| 4 | Colombia (COL) | 47 | 36 | 50 | 133 |
| 5 | Argentina (ARG) | 27 | 37 | 43 | 107 |
| 6 | Canada (CAN) | 17 | 21 | 22 | 60 |
| 7 | Cuba (CUB) | 13 | 10 | 16 | 39 |
| 8 | Chile (CHI) | 10 | 12 | 11 | 33 |
| 9 | Ecuador (ECU) | 5 | 6 | 5 | 16 |
| 10 | Peru (PER)* | 5 | 3 | 7 | 15 |
| 11 | Venezuela (VEN) | 2 | 10 | 21 | 33 |
| 12 | Trinidad and Tobago (TTO) | 2 | 1 | 1 | 4 |
| 13 | Bermuda (BER) | 2 | 1 | 0 | 3 |
| 14 | Uruguay (URU) | 1 | 0 | 1 | 2 |
| 15 | El Salvador (ESA) | 1 | 0 | 0 | 1 |
| 15 | Guatemala (GUA) | 1 | 0 | 0 | 1 |
| 17 | Dominican Republic (DOM) | 0 | 4 | 1 | 5 |
| 18 | Costa Rica (CRC) | 0 | 3 | 1 | 4 |
| 19 | Puerto Rico (PUR) | 0 | 3 | 0 | 3 |
| 20 | Jamaica (JAM) | 0 | 2 | 2 | 4 |
| 21 | Panama (PAN) | 0 | 1 | 1 | 2 |
| Totals (21 entries) | | 369 | 369 | 377 | 1,115 |

== See also ==
- 2019 Pan American Games

| Preceded by Toronto | VI Parapan American Games; Lima (2019) | Succeeded by Santiago |
