= 2022 World Para Swimming Championships – Men's 100 metre freestyle =

The men's 100m freestyle events at the 2022 World Para Swimming Championships were held at the Penteada Olympic Swimming Complex in Madeira between 12 and 18 June.

== Medalists ==
Event	Gold	Silver	Bronze
S3	Jesús Hernández Hernández; Mexico	Vincenzo Boni; Italy	Josia Topf; Germany
S4	Cameron Leslie; New Zealand	Takayuki Suzuki; Japan	Ángel de Jesús Camacho Ramírez; Mexico
S5	Francesco Bocciardo; Italy	Antoni Ponce Bertran; Spain	Koral Berkin Kutlu; Turkey
S6	Antonio Fantin; Italy	Nelson Crispín; Colombia	
S6	Antonio Fantin; Italy	Laurent Chardard; France	
S7	Andrii Trusov; Ukraine	Federico Bicelli; Italy	Carlos Serrano Zárate; Colombia
S8	Dimosthenis Michalentzakis; Greece	Robert Griswold; United States	Gabriel Cristiano Silva de Souza; Brazil
S9	Simone Barlaam; Italy	Ugo Didier; France	William Martin; Australia
S10	Rowan Crothers; Australia	Stefano Raimondi; Italy	Phelipe Rodrigues; Brazil
S11	Rogier Dorsman; Netherlands	Uchu Tomita; Japan	Mykhailo Serbin; Ukraine
S12	Raman Salei; Azerbaijan	Stephen Clegg; Great Britain	Maksym Veraksa; Ukraine
S13	Kyrylo Garashchenko; Ukraine	Muzaffar Tursunkhujaev; Uzbekistan	Alex Portal; France

== Results ==
=== S3 ===
Heats

11 swimmers from 7 nations took part. The swimmers with the top eight times, regardless of heat, advanced to the final.

Rank	Heat	Lane	Name	Nation	Result	Notes
1	1	4	Vincenzo Boni	Italy	1:45.67	Q
2	2	5	Jesús Hernández Hernández	Mexico	1:50.52	Q
3	1	5	Josia Topf	Germany	1:51.41	Q
4	2	3	Marcos Rafael Zarate Rodriguez	Mexico	1:55.00	Q
5	1	7	Grant Patterson	Australia	1:56.78	Q
6	2	2	Patricio Larenas	Chile	2:09.84	Q
7	1	3	Bruno Becker Da Silva	Brazil	2:13.72	Q
8	1	6	Krzysztof Lechniak	Poland	2:24.76	Q
9	1	2	Jose Ronaldo Da Silva	Brazil	3:06.29	
	2	4	Diego López Díaz	Mexico	DNS	
	2	7	Francesco Bettella	Italy	DNS	

Final

The final was held on 18 June 2022.

Rank	Athlete	Nation	Result	Notes
1st place, gold medalist(s)	Jesús Hernández Hernández	Mexico	1:39.55	
2nd place, silver medalist(s)	Vincenzo Boni	Italy	1:41.83	
2nd place, silver medalist(s)	Josia Topf	Germany	1:46.00	
4	Marcos Rafael Zarate Rodriguez	Mexico	1:55.63	
5	Grant Patterson	Australia	1:55.84	
6	Krzysztof Lechniak	Poland	2:07.02	
7	Patricio Larenas	Chile	2:08.24	
8	Bruno Becker Da Silva	Brazil	2:19.65	

=== S4 ===
Final

Eight swimmers from eight nations took part

Rank	Athlete	Nation	Result	Notes
1st place, gold medalist(s)	Cameron Leslie	New Zealand	1:21.80	CR
2nd place, silver medalist(s)	Takayuki Suzuki	Japan	1:23.36	
2nd place, silver medalist(s)	Angel de Jesus Camacho Ramirez	Mexico	1:25.33	
4	David Smetanine	France	1:28.14	
5	Luigi Beggiato	Italy	1:28.36	
6	Jo Gi-sung	South Korea	1:31.85	
7	Lyndon Longhorne	Great Britain	1:37.11	
8	Ariel Malyar	Israel	1:40.52	

=== S5 ===
Heats

13 swimmers from 10 nations took part. The swimmers with the top eight times, regardless of heat, advanced to the final.

Rank	Heat	Lane	Name	Nation	Result	Notes
1	2	4	Francesco Bocciardo	Italy	1:13.45	Q
2	1	4	Antoni Ponce Bertran	Spain	1:14.65	Q
3	2	5	Muhammad Nur Syaiful Zulkafli	Malaysia	1:18.42	Q
4	2	3	Luis Huerta Poza	Spain	1:19.49	Q
5	1	5	Koral Berkin Kutlu	Turkey	1:19.75	Q
6	2	6	Alexandros-Stylianos Lergios	Greece	1:21.13	Q
7	1	6	Phuchit Aingchaiyaphum	Thailand	1:21.31	Q
8	2	2	Kaede Hinata	Japan	1:21.65	Q
9	1	3	Sebastián Rodríguez Veloso	Spain	1:21.85	
10	1	2	Zy Kher Lee	Malaysia	1:26.31	
11	1	7	Henrik Krogius	Finland	1:33.86	
12	2	1	Andrii Drapkin	Ukraine	1:34.86	
	2	7	Zeyad Kahil	Egypt	DNS	

=== S6 ===
Heats

11 swimmers from 11 nations took part. The swimmers with the top eight times, regardless of heat, advanced to the final.

Rank	Heat	Lane	Name	Nation	Result	Notes
1	2	4	Antonio Fantin	Italy	1:04.08	Q, CR
2	1	5	Laurent Chardard	France	1:05.86	Q
3	1	3	Daniel Xavier Mendes	Brazil	1:06.76	Q
4	1	4	Nelson Crispín	Colombia	1:06.88	Q
5	2	3	Thijs van Hofweegen	Netherlands	1:07.85	Q
6	2	6	Juan Jose Gutierrez Bermudez	Mexico	1:08.46	Q
7	1	6	Georgios Sfaltos	Greece	1:12.17	Q
8	2	2	Leo McCrea	Switzerland	1:12.82	Q
9	1	2	Raul Gutierrez Bermudez	Mexico	1:13.63	
10	2	7	Bence Ivan	Hungary	1:14.59	
	2	5	Talisson Glock	Brazil	DNS	

Final

The final was held on 13 June 2022.

Rank	Athlete	Nation	Result	Notes
1st place, gold medalist(s)	Antonio Fantin	Italy	1:03.65	WR
2nd place, silver medalist(s)	Nelson Crispín	Colombia	1:06.41	
2nd place, silver medalist(s)	Laurent Chardard	France	1:06.41	
4	Daniel Xavier Mendes	Brazil	1:06.68	
5	Thijs van Hofweegen	Netherlands	1:07.33	
6	Juan Jose Gutierrez Bermudez	Mexico	1:08.70	
7	Georgios Sfaltos	Greece	1:11.65	
8	Leo McCrea	Switzerland	1:11.87	

=== S7 ===
Final

The final was held on 18 June 2022.

Rank	Athlete	Nation	Result	Notes
1st place, gold medalist(s)	Andrii Trusov	Ukraine	1:00.38	CR
2nd place, silver medalist(s)	Federico Bicelli	Italy	1:01.13	
2nd place, silver medalist(s)	Carlos Serrano Zárate	Colombia	1:01.25	AM
4	Iñaki Basiloff	Spain	1:02.53	
5	Facundo Arregui	Argentina	1:09.89	
6	Lucas Nicolas Poggi	Argentina	1:09.96	
7	Niranjan Mukundan	India	1:11.57	

=== S8 ===
Heats

15 swimmers from 11 nations took part. The swimmers with the top eight times, regardless of heat, advanced to the final.

Rank	Heat	Lane	Name	Nation	Result	Notes
1	2	4	Dimosthenis Michalentzakis	Greece	1:00.03	Q
2	2	5	Robert Griswold	United States	1:00.42	Q
3	1	5	Gabriel Cristiano Silva de Souza	Brazil	1:00.43	Q
4	2	3	Luis Armando Andrade Guillen	Mexico	1:00.87	Q
5	1	4	Alberto Amodeo	Italy	1:01.33	Q
6	1	6	Matthew Torres	United States	1:01.51	Q
6	2	6	Michał Golus	Poland	1:01.51	Q
8	1	2	Felix Cowan	Canada	1:02.65	Q
9	1	3	Iñigo Llopis Sanz	Spain	1:02.99	
10	2	8	Zach Zona	Canada	1:03.48	
11	2	1	Sergio Salvador Martos Minguet	Spain	1:03.83	
12	1	1	Petr Fryba	Czech Republic	1:03.90	
13	2	7	Diogo Cancelo	Portugal	1:04.19	
14	2	2	Philippe Vachon	Canada	1:04.23	
	1	7	Mark Malyar	Israel	DNS	

Final

The final was held on 15 June 2022.

Rank	Athlete	Nation	Result	Notes
1st place, gold medalist(s)	Dimosthenis Michalentzakis	Greece	59.33	
2nd place, silver medalist(s)	Robert Griswold	United States	59.98	
3rd place, bronze medalist(s)	Gabriel Cristiano Silva de Souza	Brazil	1:00.10	
4	Michał Golus	Poland	1:00.54	
5	Luis Armando Andrade Guillen	Mexico	1:00.70	
6	Alberto Amodeo	Italy	1:00.83	
7	Matthew Torres	United States	1:01.49	
8	Felix Cowan	Canada	1:01.51	

=== S9 ===
Heats

12 swimmers from 9 nations took part. The swimmers with the top eight times, regardless of heat, advanced to the final.

Rank	Heat	Lane	Name	Nation	Result	Notes
1	2	4	Simone Barlaam	Italy	55.00	Q
2	1	4	William Martin	Australia	56.56	Q
3	2	3	Ariel Enrique Schrenck Martinez	Spain	56.85	Q
3	2	5	Ugo Didier	France	56.85	Q
5	1	3	Jamal Hill	United States	57.71	Q
6	2	6	José Antonio Mari	Spain	58.22	Q
7	1	5	Simone Ciulli	Italy	58.25	Q
8	1	2	Jacobo Garrido Brun	Spain	58.89	Q
9	2	7	Leo Lähteenmäki	Finland	59.04	
	1	7	Dmytro Vasylenko	Ukraine	DNS	
	1	6	Brenden Hall	Australia	DNS	
	2	2	Fredrik Solberg	Norway	DSQ	

Final

The final was held on 15 June 2022.

Rank	Athlete	Nation	Result	Notes
1st place, gold medalist(s)	Simone Barlaam	Italy	52.23	WR
2nd place, silver medalist(s)	Ugo Didier	France	55.35	
3rd place, bronze medalist(s)	William Martin	Australia	55.45	
4	Jamal Hill	United States	56.16	AM
5	Ariel Enrique Schrenck Martinez	Spain	56.62	
6	José Antonio Mari	Spain	57.95	
7	Simone Ciulli	Italy	58.01	
8	Jacobo Garrido Brun	Spain	58.24	

=== S10 ===
Heats

10 swimmers from 10 nations took part. The swimmers with the top eight times, regardless of heat, advanced to the final.

Rank	Heat	Lane	Name	Nation	Result	Notes
1	1	4	Rowan Crothers	Australia	51.53	Q
2	1	5	Stefano Raimondi	Italy	54.08	Q
3	1	3	Phelipe Rodrigues	Brazil	54.39	Q
4	1	2	David Levecq	Spain	55.66	Q
5	1	6	Alan Ogorzalek	Poland	55.83	Q
6	1	7	Nicolas Matias Nieto	Argentina	56.22	Q
7	1	1	Alexander Elliot	Canada	56.57	Q
8	1	0	Justin Kaps	Germany	56.88	Q
9	1	9	Akito Minai	Japan	57.22	
10	1	8	Oliver Carter	United Kingdom	57.98	

Final

The final was held on 17 June 2022.

Rank	Athlete	Nation	Result	Notes
1st place, gold medalist(s)	Rowan Crothers	Australia	50.70	
2nd place, silver medalist(s)	Stefano Raimondi	Italy	51.17	
3rd place, bronze medalist(s)	Phelipe Rodrigues	Brazil	52.90	
4	Alan Ogorzalek	Poland	54.68	
5	David Levecq	Spain	55.64	
6	Alexander Elliot	Canada	55.77	
7	Nicolas Matias Nieto	Argentina	56.10	
8	Justin Kaps	Germany	57.24	

=== S11 ===
Heats

13 swimmers from 11 nations took part. The swimmers with the top eight times, regardless of heat, advanced to the final.

Rank	Heat	Lane	Name	Nation	Result	Notes
1	2	4	Rogier Dorsman	Netherlands	59.03	Q
2	1	4	Uchu Tomita	Japan	59.51	Q
3	1	5	Mykhailo Serbin	Ukraine	1:00.96	Q
4	1	3	José Ramón Cantero Elvira	Spain	1:01.05	Q
5	2	2	Marco Meneses	Portugal	:01.50	Q
6	2	6	Matheus Rheine Correa de Souza	Brazil	1:01.56	Q
7	2	3	Wendell Belarmino Pereira	Brazil	1:03.70	Q
8	1	2	David Kratochvil	Czech Republic	1:03.71	Q
9	2	7	Jose Luiz Perdigao Maia	Brazil	1:04.63	
10	1	6	Wojciech Makowski	Poland	1:04.85	
11	1	7	Matthew Cabraja	Canada	1:09.16	
12	2	1	Leider Albeiro Lemus Rojas	Colombia	1:18.56	
	2	5	Edgaras Matakas	Lithuania	DNS	

Final

The final was held on 16 June 2022.

Rank	Athlete	Nation	Result	Notes
1st place, gold medalist(s)	Rogier Dorsman	Netherlands	56.65	
2nd place, silver medalist(s)	Uchu Tomita	Japan	58.91	
3rd place, bronze medalist(s)	Mykhailo Serbin	Ukraine	59.31	
4	Matheus Rheine Correa de Souza	Brazil	59.63	
5	José Ramón Cantero Elvira	Spain	1:00.39	
6	Wendell Belarmino Pereira	Brazil	1:02.11	
7	David Kratochvil	Czech Republic	1:02.36	
8	Marco Meneses	Portugal	1:02.51	

=== S12 ===
Final

Five swimmers from four nations took part

Rank	Athlete	Nation	Result	Notes
1st place, gold medalist(s)	Raman Salei	Azerbaijan	53.07	
2nd place, silver medalist(s)	Stephen Clegg	United Kingdom	54.10	
3rd place, bronze medalist(s)	Maksym Veraksa	Ukraine	54.13	
4	Illia Yaremenko	Ukraine	54.79	
5	Borja Sanz Tamayo	Spain	56.83	

=== S13 ===
Heats

14 swimmers from 9 nations took part. The swimmers with the top eight times, regardless of heat, advanced to the final.

Rank	Heat	Lane	Name	Nation	Result	Notes
1	1	4	Islam Aslanov	Uzbekistan	53.43	Q
2	2	2	Muzaffar Tursunkhujaev	Uzbekistan	53.62	Q
3	2	5	Thomas van Wanrooij	Netherlands	53.73	Q
4	2	4	Kyrylo Garashchenko	Ukraine	53.87	Q
5	2	6	Ivan Salguero Oteiza	Spain	54.24	Q
6	1	5	Alex Portal	France	54.67	Q
7	2	3	Oleksii Virchenko	Ukraine	54.99	Q
8	1	3	Taliso Engel	Germany	55.22	Q
9	1	2	Kamil Rzetelski	Poland	55.46	
10	1	6	Douglas Matera	Brazil	55.65	
11	1	7	Enrique José Alhambra Mollar	Spain	56.36	
12	2	1	Juan Ferron Gutierrez	Spain	56.58	
13	2	7	Genki Saito	Japan	57.32	
14	1	1	Guilherme Batista Silva	Brazil	59.57	

Final

The final was held on 14 June 2022.

Rank	Athlete	Nation	Result	Notes
1st place, gold medalist(s)	Kyrylo Garashchenko	Ukraine	53.29	
2nd place, silver medalist(s)	Muzaffar Tursunkhujaev	Uzbekistan	53.33	
3rd place, bronze medalist(s)	Alex Portal	France	53.34	
4	Islam Aslanov	Uzbekistan	53.71	
5	Oleksii Virchenko	Ukraine	53.88	
6	Thomas van Wanrooij	Netherlands	53.98	
7	Ivan Salguero Oteiza	Spain	54.27	
8	Taliso Engel	Germany	54.77	
