= Swimming at the 2023 Parapan American Games =

Swimming competitions at the 2023 Parapan American Games

- Swimming pictogram
- Venue: Aquatic Center
- Dates: 18 – 24 November 2023
- No. of events: 120
- Competitors: 235 from 20 nations

Swimming competitions at the 2023 Parapan American Games in Santiago, Chile were held at the Aquatic Center from 18 to 24 November 2023.

== Participating nations ==
There are 235 swimmers from 20 nations participating in the games.

- Argentina (32)
- Barbados (1)
- Brazil (38)
- Canada (14)
- Chile (11) (Host)
- Colombia (24)
- Costa Rica (4)
- Cuba (4)
- Dominican Republic (2)
- Ecuador (2)
- El Salvador (1)
- Mexico (40)
- Panama (3)
- Paraguay (1)
- Peru (8)
- Puerto Rico (2)
- Saint Vincent and the Grenadines (1)
- United States (36)
- Uruguay (2)
- Venezuela (9)

== Medal table ==
* Host nation (Chile)

Rank	NPC	Gold	Silver	Bronze	Total
1	Brazil (BRA)	67	30	23	120
2	Colombia (COL)	20	23	21	64
3	Mexico (MEX)	11	23	21	55
4	United States (USA)	11	22	19	52
5	Argentina (ARG)	9	12	15	36
6	Chile (CHI)*	1	6	3	10
7	Canada (CAN)	1	2	7	10
8	Venezuela (VEN)	0	1	2	3
9	Costa Rica (CRC)	0	1	1	2
10	Ecuador (ECU)	0	1	0	1
11	Peru (PER)	0	0	4	4
12	Cuba (CUB)	0	0	3	3
Totals (12 entries)		120	121	119	360

== Medalists ==
=== Men's events ===
==== Freestyle ====
Event	Class	Gold	Silver	Bronze
50 m	S2	Gabriel Araújo; Brazil	Alberto Abarza; Chile	Cristopher Tronco; Mexico
50 m	S3	Diego López Díaz; Mexico	Marcos Zarate; Mexico	Patricio Larenas; Chile
50 m	S5	Samuel Oliveira; Brazil	Tiago de Oliveira; Brazil	Abbas Karimi; United States
50 m	S7	Carlos Serrano Zárate; Colombia	Iñaki Basiloff; Argentina	Yosjaniel Hernández; Cuba
50 m	S9	Vanilton do Nascimento; Brazil	Andrey Ribeiro; Brazil	Noah Busch; United States
50 m	S10	Phelipe Rodrigues; Brazil	Fernando Lu; Canada	Yaseen El-Demerdash; United States
50 m	S11	Wendell Belarmino; Brazil	Matheus Rheine; Brazil	Brayan Triana; Colombia
50 m	S13	Douglas Matera; Brazil	Thomaz Matera; Brazil	Fernando Martinez; Mexico
100 m	S2	Gabriel Araújo; Brazil	Alberto Abarza; Chile	Rodrigo Santillan; Peru
100 m	S5	Samuel Oliveira; Brazil	Tiago de Oliveira; Brazil	Miguel Ángel Rincón; Colombia
100 m	S6	Talisson Glock; Brazil	Nelson Crispín; Colombia	Lorenzo Pérez; Cuba
100 m	S8	Carlos Serrano Zárate; Colombia	Gabriel Cristiano; Brazil	Luis Andrade; Mexico
100 m	S10	Phelipe Rodrigues; Brazil	Yaseen El-Demerdash; United States	Jagdev Gill; Canada
100 m	S12	Douglas Matera; Brazil	Daniel Giraldo Correa; Colombia	Thomaz Matera; Brazil
200 m	S2	Gabriel Araújo; Brazil	Alberto Abarza; Chile	Rodrigo Santillan; Peru
200 m	S3	Diego López Díaz; Mexico	Marcos Zarate; Mexico	Patricio Larenas; Chile
200 m	S5	Samuel Oliveira; Brazil	Miguel Ángel Rincón; Colombia	Kevin Moreno; Colombia
200 m	S14	Gabriel Bandeira; Brazil	Juan Garcia; Colombia	Tyson MacDonald; Canada
400 m	S6	Talisson Glock; Brazil	Juan Gutiérrez; Mexico	Jesus Gutiérrez; Mexico
400 m	S7	Iñaki Basiloff; Argentina	Adin Williams; United States	Facundo Arregui; Argentina
400 m	S9	Andrey Ribeiro; Brazil	Erick Tandazo; Ecuador	Victor dos Santos; Brazil
400 m	S11	Matheus Rheine; Brazil	Wendell Belarmino; Brazil	Sergio Zayas; Argentina
400 m	S13	Douglas Matera; Brazil	Fernando Martinez; Mexico	Thomaz Matera; Brazil

==== Backstroke ====
Event	Class	Gold	Silver	Bronze
50 m	S2	Gabriel Araújo; Brazil	Cristopher Tronco; Mexico Alberto Abarza; Chile	No bronze medalist; tie for silver
50 m	S3	Diego López Díaz; Mexico	Marcos Zarate; Mexico	José Silva; Peru
50 m	S4	Ángel Camacho; Mexico	Jesus Hernandez; Mexico	Gustavo Sánchez; Mexico
50 m	S5	Samuel Oliveira; Brazil	Kevin Moreno; Colombia	Tiago de Oliveira; Brazil
100 m	S2	Gabriel Araújo; Brazil	Alberto Abarza; Chile	Rodrigo Santillan; Peru
100 m	S6	Matias de Andrade; Argentina	Nelson Crispín; Colombia	Talisson Glock; Brazil
100 m	S8	Fernando Carlomagno; Argentina	Jack O'Neil; United States	Iñaki Basiloff; Argentina
100 m	S9	Victor dos Santos; Brazil	Andrey Pereira; Brazil	Lucas Mozela; Brazil
100 m	S10	Yaseen El-Demerdash; United States	Santiago Senestro; Argentina	Nicolas Nieto; Argentina
100 m	S11	Wendell Belarmino; Brazil	Leider Lemus; Colombia	José Luiz Perdigão; Brazil
100 m	S12	Douglas Matera; Brazil	Evan Wilkerson; United States	Daniel Giraldo Correa; Colombia
100 m	S14	Gabriel Bandeira; Brazil	Juan Garcia; Colombia	Tyson MacDonald; Canada

==== Breaststroke ====
Event	Class	Gold	Silver	Bronze
50 m	SB2	José Castorena; Mexico	Cristopher Tronco; Mexico	Marcos Zarate; Mexico
100 m	SB4	Diego Rivera; Argentina	Miguel Ángel Rincón; Colombia	Jesús Ruiz; Mexico
100 m	SB5	Roberto Alcalde; Brazil	German Arevalo; Argentina	Julián Triana; Colombia
100 m	SB6	Nelson Crispín; Colombia	Zachary Shattuck; United States	Iñaki Basiloff; Argentina
100 m	SB8	Carlos Serrano Zárate; Colombia	Vicente Almonacid; Chile	Luis Andrade; Mexico
100 m	SB9	Lucas Mozela; Brazil	Ruan Lima; Brazil	Santiago Senestro; Argentina
100 m	SB11	Leider Lemus; Colombia	Brayan Triana; Colombia	José Luiz Perdigão; Brazil
100 m	SB12	Daniel Giraldo Correa; Colombia	William Rankine; United States	Evan Wilkerson; United States
100 m	SB14	Gabriel Bandeira; Brazil	Elian Araya; Argentina	Oswald Yzarra; Venezuela

==== Butterfly ====
Event	Class	Gold	Silver	Bronze
50 m	S5	Samuel Oliveira; Brazil	Tiago de Oliveira; Brazil	Abbas Karimi; United States
50 m	S6	Nelson Crispín; Colombia	Jesus Gutiérrez; Mexico	Zachary Shattuck; United States
50 m	S7	Evan Austin; United States	Carlos Serrano Zárate; Colombia	Iñaki Basiloff; Argentina
100 m	S8	Gabriel Cristiano; Brazil	Lucas Leguiza; Argentina	Luis Andrade; Mexico
100 m	S9	Vanilton do Nascimento; Brazil	Victor dos Santos; Brazil	David Gelfand; United States
100 m	S10	Phelipe Rodrigues; Brazil	Nicolas Nieto; Argentina	Fernando Lu; Canada
100 m	S11	Wendell Belarmino; Brazil	Leider Lemus; Colombia	José Luiz Perdigão; Brazil
100 m	S12	Douglas Matera; Brazil	Daniel Giraldo Correa; Colombia	Thomaz Matera; Brazil
100 m	S14	Gabriel Bandeira; Brazil	Lautaro Maidana; Argentina	Trevor Lukacsko; United States

==== Medley ====
Event	Class	Gold	Silver	Bronze
150 m	SM4	Ángel Camacho; Mexico	Gustavo Sánchez; Mexico	Jesús Hernandez; Mexico
200 m	SM6	Nelson Crispín; Colombia	Talisson Glock; Brazil	Jesus Gutiérrez; Mexico
200 m	SM7	Carlos Serrano Zárate; Colombia	Iñaki Basiloff; Argentina	Yosjaniel Hernández; Cuba
200 m	SM8	Vicente Almonacid; Chile	Luis Andrade; Mexico	Lucas Leguiza; Argentina
200 m	SM9	Lucas Mozela; Brazil	David Gelfand; United States	Victor dos Santos; Brazil
200 m	SM10	Santiago Senestro; Argentina	Ruan Lima; Brazil	Phelipe Rodrigues; Brazil
200 m	SM11	Wendell Belarmino; Brazil	Brayan Triana; Colombia	José Luiz Perdigão; Brazil
200 m	SM13	Douglas Matera; Brazil	Daniel Giraldo Correa; Colombia	William Rankine; United States
200 m	SM14	Gabriel Bandeira; Brazil	Tyson MacDonald; Canada	Lauturo Maidana; Argentina

=== Women's events ===
==== Freestyle ====
Event	Class	Gold	Silver	Bronze
50 m	S4	Lidia Vieira; Brazil	Patrícia Pereira; Brazil	Nely Miranda; Mexico
50 m	S6	Laila Suzigan; Brazil	Megan Gioffreda; United States	Mayara Petzold; Brazil
50 m	S8	Cecília Araújo; Brazil	Sara Vargas Blanco; Colombia	McKenzie Coan; United States
50 m	S10	María Barrera Zapata; Colombia	Mariana Gesteira; Brazil	Daniela Gimenez; Argentina
50 m	S11	Analuz Pellitero; Argentina	Nadia Báez; Argentina	Matilde Alcázar; Mexico
50 m	S13	Carol Santiago; Brazil	Grace Nuhfer; United States	Lucilene Sousa; Brazil
100 m	S5	Mariana Guerrero; Colombia	Lidia Vieira; Brazil	Ana Noriega; Argentina
100 m	S7	Sara Vargas Blanco; Colombia	McKenzie Coan; United States	Zharith Rodríguez; Colombia
100 m	S9	Mariana Gesteira; Brazil	Natalie Sims; United States	Cecília Araújo; Brazil
100 m	S10	María Barrera Zapata; Colombia	Taylor Winnett; United States	Silvana López; Mexico
100 m	S11	Analuz Pellitero; Argentina	Sharit Yunque; Colombia	Matilde Alcázar; Mexico
100 m	S12	Carol Santiago; Brazil	Lucilene Sousa; Brazil	Belkys Mota; Venezuela
200 m	S5	Mariana Guerrero; Colombia	Lidia Vieira; Brazil	Ana Noriega; Argentina
200 m	S14	Ana Karolina Soares; Brazil	Beatriz Borges; Brazil	Debora Borges; Brazil
400 m	S6	Laila Suzigan; Brazil	Mayara Petzold; Brazil	Vianney Trejo; Mexico
400 m	S8	Cecília Araújo; Brazil	Paola Ruvalcaba; Mexico	McKenzie Coan; United States
400 m	S9	Keegan Knott; United States	Cali Prochaska; United States	Madelyn White; United States
400 m	S10	María Barrera Zapata; Colombia	Taylor Winnett; United States	Mikaela Jenkins; United States
400 m	S11	Matilde Alcázar; Mexico	Analuz Pellitero; Argentina	Sharit Yunque; Colombia

==== Backstroke ====
Event	Class	Gold	Silver	Bronze
50 m	S4	Nely Miranda; Mexico	Lidia Vieira; Brazil	Edenia Garcia; Brazil
50 m	S5	Mariana Guerrero; Colombia	Karina Hernandez; Mexico	Gabriela Oviedo; Colombia
100 m	S6	Ruby Stevens; Canada	Vianney Trejo; Mexico	Megan Gioffreda; United States
100 m	S7	Sara Vargas Blanco; Colombia	McKenzie Coan; United States	Zharith Rodríguez; Colombia
100 m	S8	Paola Ruvalcaba; Mexico	Cecília Araújo; Brazil	Laura Carolina González Rodríguez; Colombia
100 m	S9	Mariana Gesteira; Brazil	Maria Francescotti; United States	Keegan Knott; United States
100 m	S10	Taylor Winnett; United States	Chloe Cederholm; United States	María Barrera Zapata; Colombia
100 m	S11	Analuz Pellitero; Argentina	Matilde Alcázar; Mexico	Sharit Yunque; Colombia
100 m	S14	Ana Karolina Soares; Brazil	Citli Salinas; Mexico	Emma Van Dyk; Canada

==== Breaststroke ====
Event	Class	Gold	Silver	Bronze
50 m	SB3	Patrícia Pereira; Brazil	Nely Miranda; Mexico	Lidia Vieira; Brazil
100 m	SB4	Alessandra Oliveira; Brazil	Gabriela Oviedo; Colombia	Susana Schnarndorf; Brazil
100 m	SB5	Laila Suzigan; Brazil	Esthefany de Oliveira; Brazil	Vianney Trejo; Mexico
100 m	SB7	Gisell Prada; Colombia	Naomi Somellera; Mexico	Natalia González; Mexico
100 m	SB8	Madelyn White; United States	Camila Haase; Costa Rica	Cali Prochaska; United States
100 m	SB9	Daniela Gimenez; Argentina	Taylor Winnett; United States	Sara Bofinger; United States
100 m	SB12	Carol Santiago; Brazil	Belkys Mota; Venezuela	Nadia Báez; Argentina
100 m	SB14	Beatriz Borges; Brazil	Debora Borges; Brazil	Citli Salinas; Mexico

==== Butterfly ====
Event	Class	Gold	Silver	Bronze
50 m	S5	Esthefany de Oliveira; Brazil	Darlin Romero; Colombia	Jordan Tucker; Canada
50 m	S6	Mayara Petzold; Brazil	Laila Suzigan; Brazil	Karla Bravo; Mexico
50 m	S7	Zharith Rodríguez; Colombia	Sara Vargas Blanco; Colombia	Naomi Somellera; Mexico
100 m	S8	Vitória Ribeiro; Brazil	Cecília Araújo; Brazil	Laura Carolina González Rodríguez; Colombia
100 m	S9	Cali Prochaska; United States	Daniela Gimenez; Argentina	Kiara Godoy; Chile
100 m	S10	Taylor Winnett; United States	Mikaela Jenkins; United States	María Barrera Zapata; Colombia
100 m	S14	Ana Karolina Soares; Brazil	Citli Salinas; Mexico	Justine Morrier; Canada

==== Medley ====
Event	Class	Gold	Silver	Bronze
150 m	SM4	Nely Miranda; Mexico	Patrícia Pereira; Brazil	Lidia Vieira; Brazil
200 m	SM5	Esthefany de Oliveira; Brazil	Mariana Guerrero; Colombia	Gabriela Oviedo; Colombia
200 m	SM6	Megan Gioffreda; United States	Laila Suzigan; Brazil	Mayara Petzold; Brazil
200 m	SM7	Sara Vargas Blanco; Colombia	Zharith Rodríguez; Colombia	Mallory Weggemann; United States
200 m	SM8	Haven Shepherd; United States	Cecília Araújo; Brazil	Laura Carolina González Rodríguez; Colombia
200 m	SM9	Cali Prochaska; United States	Keegan Knott; United States	Camila Haase; Costa Rica
200 m	SM10	Taylor Winnett; United States	Silvana López; Mexico	Chloe Cederholm; United States
200 m	SM11	Matilde Alcázar; Mexico	Analuz Pellitero; Argentina	Nadia Báez; Argentina
200 m	SM14	Ana Karolina Soares; Brazil	Debora Borges; Brazil	Beatriz Borges; Brazil

=== Mixed events ===
==== Freestyle ====
Event	Class	Gold	Silver	Bronze
4 × 50 m Relay	20 pts	Brazil; Laila Suzigan; Patrícia Pereira; Samuel Oliveira; Tiago de Oliveira	Mexico; Karla Bravo; Nely Miranda; Raúl Gutiérrez; Ángel Camacho	Colombia; Mariana Guerrero; Gabriela Oviedo; Miguel Ángel Rincón; Kevin Moreno
4 × 100 m Relay	34 pts	Brazil; Mariana Gesteira; Cecília Araújo; Talisson Glock; Phelipe Rodrigues	United States; Natalie Sims; McKenzie Coan; Jack O'Neil; Yaseen El-Demerdash	Colombia; Maira Duarte; María Barrera Zapata; Nelson Crispín; Carlos Serrano Zárate
4 × 100 m Relay	49 pts	Brazil; Carol Santiago; Lucilene Sousa; Douglas Matera; Matheus Rheine	Mexico; Rebeca Lugo; Matilde Alcázar; Carlos Lechuga; Fernando Martínez	Colombia; Michel Cortés; Sharit Yunque; Brayan Triana; Daniel Giraldo Correa

==== Medley ====
Event	Class	Gold	Silver	Bronze
4 × 50 m Relay	20 pts	Brazil; Mayara Petzold; Patrícia Pereira; Samuel Oliveira; Roberto Alcalde	Mexico; Naomi Somellera; Nely Miranda; Pedro Rangel; Ángel Camacho	Colombia; Mariana Guerrero; Gabriela Oviedo; Nelson Crispín; Miguel Ángel Rincón
4 × 100 m Relay	34 pts	Brazil; Mariana Gesteira; Cecília Araújo; Lucas Mozela; Gabriel Cristiano	United States; Taylor Winnett; McKenzie Coan; Emmett Martin; Jack O'Neil	Colombia; Sara Vargas Blanco; María Barrera Zapata; Juan Castro; Carlos Serrano Zárate
4 × 100 m Relay	49 pts	Brazil; Carol Santiago; Lucilene Sousa; Douglas Matera; Wendell Belarmino	Colombia; Michel Cortés; Sharit Yunque; Leider Lemus; Daniel Giraldo Correa	Argentina; Nadia Báez; Analuz Pellitero; Walter Piazza; Jonas Simone

== See also ==
- Swimming at the 2023 Pan American Games
- Swimming at the 2024 Summer Paralympics
