= Swimming at the 2019 Parapan American Games =

- Venue: Villa Deportiva Nacional Videna Aquatic Centre
- Dates: August 25 - August 31

Paralympic swimming at the 2019 Parapan American Games in Lima, Peru was held at the Villa Deportiva Nacional Videna Aquatic Centre.

== Medal table ==
* Host nation (Peru)

Rank	Nation	Gold	Silver	Bronze	Total
1	Brazil	53	45	29	127
2	Mexico	27	33	23	83
3	Colombia	25	11	21	57
4	United States	14	16	32	62
5	Argentina	9	17	14	40
6	Canada	6	7	8	21
7	Chile	5	3	1	9
8	Cuba	1	4	2	7
9	Costa Rica	0	1	0	1
9	Dominican Republic	0	1	0	1
9	Puerto Rico	0	1	0	1
12	Venezuela	0	0	4	4
13	Peru*	0	0	2	2
14	Ecuador	0	0	1	1
14	Uruguay	0	0	1	1
Totals (15 entries)		140	139	138	417

== Medalists ==
=== Men's events ===
Event	Class	Gold		Silver		Bronze	
50m Freestyle	S2 (S1)	Gabriel dos Santos; Brazil	57.88	Alberto Abarza; Chile	59.10	Bruno Becker; Brazil	1:02.47
50m Freestyle	S3	Diego López Díaz; Mexico	47.11	Marcos Zárate; Mexico	52.89	Cristobal Rincon Rojas; Colombia	1:01.42
50m Freestyle	S4	Gustavo Sanchez Martinez; Mexico	41.78	Jesús Hernández Hernández; Mexico	45.64	Luis Lopera; Colombia	47.64
50m Freestyle	S5	Daniel Dias; Brazil	33.71	Miguel Ángel Rincón; Colombia	38.22	David Fuentes Quintana; Colombia	42.77
50m Freestyle	S6	Nelson Crispín; Colombia	29.38	Lorenzo Perez Escalona; Cuba	31.25	Talisson Glock; Brazil	32.13
50m Freestyle	S7	Carlos Serrano Zárate; Colombia	28.19	Iñaki Basiloff; Argentina	30.69	Liam Smith; United States	32.11
50m Freestyle	S8	Gabriel Cristiano Silva de Souza; Brazil	27.76	Luís Armando Guillen; Mexico	28.18	Vicente Almonacid; Chile	29.96
50m Freestyle	S9	Ruiter Silva; Brazil	26.37	João Pedro Drummond Oliva; Brazil	26.42	Vanilton do Nascimento Filho; Brazil	36.67
50m Freestyle	S10	Phelipe Rodrigues; Brazil	23.70	Jamal Hill; United States	26.10	Tye Dutcher; United States	26.50
50m Freestyle	S11	Wendell Belarmino; Brazil	27.02	Matheus Rheine; Brazil	27.98	Yunerki Ponce; Cuba	28.52
50m Freestyle	S12	Thomaz Matera; Brazil	25.85	Yasmany Izquierdo; Cuba	26.12	Daniel Giraldo Correa; Colombia	26.16
50m Freestyle	S13	Carlos Farrenberg; Brazil	24.96	Douglas Matera; Brazil	25.66	Guilherme Batista Silva; Brazil	25.78
100m Freestyle	S2 (S1)	Gabriel dos Santos; Brazil	2:04.06	Alberto Abarza; Chile	2:08.28	Bruno Becker; Brazil	2:12.56
100m Freestyle	S3	Diego López Díaz; Mexico	1:35.84	Marcos Zárate; Mexico	1:54.24	Luíz Godinez; Mexico	2:22.27
100m Freestyle	S4	Gustavo Sánchez Martínez; Mexico	1:31.38	Jesús Hernández Hernández; Mexico	1:36.62	Arnulfo Castorena; Mexico	1:45.94
100m Freestyle	S5	Daniel Dias; Brazil	1:11.88	Miguel Ángel Rincón; Colombia	1:28.02	David Fuentes Quintana; Colombia	1:30.85
100m Freestyle	S6	Nelson Crispín; Colombia	1:06.02	Lorenzo Perez Escalona; Cuba	1:07.85	Talisson Glock; Brazil	1:08.72
100m Freestyle	S7	Carlos Serrano Zárate; Colombia	1:02.22	Iñaki Basiloff; Argentina	1:04.88	Liam Smith; United States	1:09.09
100m Freestyle	S8	Luís Guillen; Mexico	1:01.23	Gabriel Cristiano Silva; Brazil	1:02.58	Matthew Torres; United States	1:03.91
100m Freestyle	S9	Ruiter Silva; Brazil	57.38	Vanilton do Nascimento Filho; Brazil	58.69	João Pedro Drumond Olivia; Brazil	59.56
100m Freestyle	S10	Phelipe Rodrigues; Brazil	52.63	Nicolas Nieto; Argentina	57.56	Bruno Lemaire; Argentina	58.41
100m Freestyle	S11	Wendell Belarmino; Brazil	59.33	Matheus Rheine; Brazil	1:00.46	José Perdigão Maia; Brazil	1:03.27
100m Freestyle	S12	Daniel Giraldo Correa; Colombia	56.70	Thomaz Matera; Brazil	56.78	Diego Cuesta Martínez; Colombia	59.06
100m Freestyle	S13	Carlos Farrenberg; Brazil	55.34	Douglas Matera; Brazil	55.38	Carson Sanocki; United States	57.53
200m Freestyle	S2 (S1-S2)	Alberto Abarza; Chile	4:10.06	Gabriel dos Santos; Brazil	4:45.96	Bruno Becker; Brazil	4:52.40
200m Freestyle	S3	Diego López Díaz; Mexico	3:40.78	Marcos Zárate; Mexico	4:07.22	Luis Godínez; Mexico	5:01.76
200m Freestyle	S5(S4)	Daniel Dias; Brazil	2:43.34	Gustavo Sánchez Martínez; Mexico	3:01.66	Miguel Ángel Rincón; Colombia	3:03.76
200m Freestyle	S14	Nicholas Bennett; Canada	1:59.10	Felipe Caltran; Brazil	1:59.30	Tyson MacDonald; Canada	2:03.44
400m Freestyle	S6	Lorenzo Perez Escalona; Cuba	5:19.37	Nelson Crispín; Colombia	5:19.63	Raul Bermudez; Mexico	5:24.54
400m Freestyle	S7	Iñaki Basiloff; Argentina	4:54.54	Carlos Serrano Zárate; Colombia	4:54.96	Facundo Arregui; Argentina	4:57.86
400m Freestyle	S9 (S8)	Matthew Torres; United States	4:34.28	Ruiter Silva; Brazil	4:35.27	Vanilton do Nascimento Filho; Brazil	4:40.31
400m Freestyle	S10	Phelipe Rodrigues; Brazil	4:29.60	Nicolas Nieto; Argentina	4:31.17	Erick Proaño; Ecuador	4:32.76
400m Freestyle	S11	Matheus Rheine; Brazil	4:54.11	Wendell Belarmino; Brazil	4:54.40	Ross Minor; United States	4:54.93
400m Freestyle	S13(S12)	Douglas Matera; Brazil	4:29.58	Carson Sanocki; United States	4:32.48	Guilherme Batista Silva; Brazil	4:46.63
50m Backstroke	S2(S1)	Alberto Abarza; Chile	58.25	Cristopher Tronco; Mexico	1:04.45	Gabriel dos Santos; Brazil	1:13.59
50m Backstroke	S3	Diego López Díaz; Mexico	45.06	Marcos Zárate; Mexico	1:02.40	Luís Burgos; Mexico	1:06.83
50m Backstroke	S4	Jesús Hernandéz Hernández; Mexico	45.38	Gustavo Sánchez Martínez; Mexico	49.52	Luís Patiño; Colombia	52.79
50m Backstroke	S5	Daniel Dias; Brazil	36.79	Oscar Resendiz; Mexico	45.56	Miguel Ángel Rincón; Colombia	45.80
100m Backstroke	S2(S1)	Alberto Abarza; Chile	2:05.12	Cristopher Tronco; Mexico	2:24.20	Rodrigo Santillan; Peru	2:35.27
100m Backstroke	S6	Matias de Andrade; Argentina	1:15.50	Talisson Glock; Brazil	1:21.63	Nelson Crispín; Colombia	1:22.41
100m Backstroke	S7	Pipo Carlomagno; Argentina	1:12.20	Ítalo Gomes Pereira Lima; Brazil	1:15.03	Carlos Serrano Zárate; Colombia	1:15.47
100m Backstroke	S8	Matthew Torres; United States	1:10.70	Joseph Peppersack; United States	1:13.53	Luis Armando Guillen; Mexico	1:1689
100m Backstroke	S9	Andrey Pereira Garbe; Brazil	1:07.00	Lucas Mozela; Brazil	1:07.10	Amilcar Guerra; Argentina	1:11.70
100m Backstroke	S10	Tye Dutcher; United States	1:04.67	Nicolas Nieto; Argentina	1:06.79	Phelipe Rodrigues; Brazil	1:07.05
100m Backstroke	S11	Sergio Zayas; Argentina	1:17.39	José Perdigão; Brazil	1:18.10	Leider Rojas; Colombia	1:18.19
100m Backstroke	S12	Daniel Giraldo Correa; Colombia	1:08.62	Thomaz Matera; Brazil	1:09.38	Diego Fernando Martínez; Colombia	1:10.50
100m Backstroke	S13	Douglas Matera; Brazil	1:07.66	Gabriel Ortiz Duran; Colombia	1:16.23	Andy Guerrero Sánchez; Mexico	1:18.34
100m Backstroke	S14	Tyson MacDonald; Canada	1:04.24	Lautaro Cancinos; Argentina	1:05.85	Felipe Caltran; Brazil	1:06.37
50m Breaststroke	SB2 (SB1)	Arnulfo Castorena; Mexico	56.54	Cristopher Tronco; Mexico	1:02.93	Marcos Zárate; Mexico	1:09.48
50m Breaststroke	SB3	Gustavo Sánchez Martinez; Mexico	54.23	Jesús Hernández Hernández; Mexico	1:02.81	Franco Gómez; Argentina	1:20.49
100m Breaststroke	SB4	Moisés Fuentes; Colombia	1:39.80	Miguel Ángel Rincón; Colombia	1:48.68	Ariel Quassi; Argentina	2:04.27
100m Breaststroke	SB5	Roberto Alcade; Brazil	1:38.41	Pedro Haro; Mexico	1:40.26	Germán Arevalo; Argentina	1:44.96
100m Breaststroke	SB6	Nelson Crispín; Colombia	1:20.39	Zachary Shattuck; United States	1:26.31	Pipo Carlomagno; Argentina	1:32.65
100m Breaststroke	SB7	Carlos Serrano Zárate; Colombia	1:13.45	Liam Smith; United States	1:26.16	Ericsson Sosa; Venezuela	1:27.41
100m Breaststroke	SB8	Vicente Almonacid; Chile	1:13.14	Luís Armando Guillen; Mexico	1:20.49	Sam Murray Jr. United States	1:24.48
100m Breaststroke	SB9	Lucas Mozela; Brazil	1:11.76	Patrick Waters; Canada	1:14.77	Gonzal Irinitz; Uruguay	1:15.81
100m Breaststroke	SB11	Leider Lemus; Colombia	1:16.04	Wendell Belarmino; Brazil	1:22.53	José Perdigão Maia; Brazil	1:24.33
100m Breaststroke	SB12	Daniel Giraldo Correa; Colombia	1:12.09	Darvin Eliza; Puerto Rico	1:17.36	Diego Cuesta Martinéz; Colombia	1:17.67
100m Breaststroke	SB13	Carson Sanocki; United States	1:09.22	Guilherme Batista; Brazil	1:12.00	Yeison Castellanos; Colombia	1:17.66
100m Breaststroke	SB14	Nicholas Bennett; Canada	1:09.40	Elian Araya; Argentina	1:10.49	Felipe Caltran; Brazil	1:13.46
50m Butterfly	S4 (S1-S3)	Gustavo Sánchez Martínez; Mexico	54.33	Marcos Zárate; Mexico	56.31	Gabriel dos Santos; Brazil	1:01.65
50m Butterfly	S5	Daniel Dias; Brazil	36.31	Miguel Ángel Rincón; Colombia	40.83	David Fuentes Quintana; Colombia	48.60
50m Butterfly	S6	Nelson Crispín; Colombia	31.30	Raúl Martinez Valdes; Mexico	33.61	Zachary Shattuck; United States	33.90
50m Butterfly	S7	Carlos Serrano Zárate; Colombia	30.05	Iñaki Basiloff; Argentina	31.48	Lima Smith; United States	34.19
100m Butterfly	S8	Gabriel Cristiano Silva de Souza; Brazil	1:07.20	Luís Armando Guillen; Mexico	1:10.58	Agustín Orellana; Argentina	1:18.94
100m Butterfly	S9	Vanilton do Nascimento; Brazil	1:03.19	Ruiter Silva; Brazil	1:04.86	Amilcar Guerra; Argentina	1:06.02
100m Butterfly	S10	Phelipe Rodrigues; Brazil	1:03.19	Juan Castillo Estévez; Cuba	1:03.19	Tye Dutcher; United States	1:03.19
100m Butterfly	S11	Wendell Belarmino; Brazil	1:08.22	José Perdião Maia; Brazil	1:09.43	Leider Lemus Rojas; Colombia	1:13.06
100m Butterfly	S13 (S12)	Douglas Matera; Brazil	59.55	Thomaz Matera; Brazil	1:01.20	Daniel Giraldo Correa; Colombia	1:02.49
100m Butterfly	S14	Lautaro Cancinos; Argentina	1:00.79	Nicholas Bennett; Canada	1:01.58	Felipe Caltran; Brazil	1:03.66
150m Individual Medley	SM3 (SM1-SM2)	Diego López Díaz; Mexico	2:57.50	Arnulfo Castorena; Mexico	1:04.86	Marcos Zárate; Mexico	1:04.86
200m Individual Medley	SM6 (SM5-6)	Nelson Crispín; Colombia	2:45.43	Talisson Glock; Brazil	2:51.61	Zachary Shattuck; United States	2:53.66
200m Individual Medley	SM7	Carlos Serrano Zárate; Colombia	2:35.08	Iñaki Basiloff; Argentina	2:41.42	Juan Bermudez; Mexico	2:48.42
200m Individual Medley	SM8	Luís Armando Guillen; Mexico	2:36.71	Vicente Almonacid; Chile	2:40.30	Matthew Torres; United States	2:43.27
200m Individual Medley	SM9	Lucas Mozela; Brazil	2:23.90	Ruiter Silva; Brazil	2:25.68	David Gelfand; United States	2:28.16
200m Individual Medley	SM10	Phelipe Rodrigues; Brazil	2:25.45	Santiago Senestro; Argentina	2:30.27	Yahir Jiménez; Mexico	2:36.88
200m Individual Medley	SM11	Wendell Belarmino; Brazil	2:32.66	José Perdigão Maia; Brazil	2:44.78	Leider Lemus Rojas; Colombia	2:45.13
200m Individual Medley	SM12	Daniel Giraldo Correa; Colombia	2:31.08	Diego Cuesta Martínez; Colombia	2:32.64	Osdany Madrigal; Cuba	2:47.30
200m Individual Medley	SM13	Carson Sanocki; United States	2:19.08	Douglas Matera; Brazil	2:19.39	Guilherme Batista Silva; Brazil	2:29.58
200m Individual Medley	SM14	Nicholas Bennett; Canada	2:15.56	Tyson MacDonald; Canada	2:19.60	Felipe Caltran Vila Real; Brazil	2:22.64
4x100m Freestyle Relay	34 points	Phelipe Rodrigues; Ruiter Silva; Talisson Glock; Vanilton do Nascimento Filho; Brazil	3:59.03	Bruno Lemaire; Facundo Arregui; Iñaki Basiloff; Nicolas Nieto; Argentina	4:10.22	David Gelfand; Jamal Hill; Liam Smith; Matthew Torres; United States	4:14.67
4x100m Medley Relay	34 points	Daniel Dias; Lucas Mozela; Phelipe Rodrigues; Vanilton do Nascimento Filho; Brazil	4:30.79	Bruno Lemaire; Pipo Carlomagno; Iñaki Basiloff; Santiago Senestro; Argentina	4:32.96	Jamal Hill; Matthew Torres; Tye Dutcher; Zachary Shattuck; United States	4:37.64

=== Women's events ===
Event	Class	Gold		Silver		Bronze	
50m Freestyle	S5 (S3-S4)	Joana Neves; Brazil	38.05	Patrícia Pereira; Brazil	42.24	Ana Noriega; Argentina	43.76
50m Freestyle	S6	Sara Vargas Blanco; Colombia	35.73	Laila Suzigan; Brazil	37.12	Valeria Lopez Gomez; Mexico	38.33
50m Freestyle	S7	Naomi Mandujano; Mexico	37.28	Krystal Shaw; Canada	40.80	Abigail Gase; United States	43.38
50m Freestyle	S8	Cecília Jerônimo de Araújo; Brazil	30.68	Paola Ruvalcaba; Mexico	34.01	Haven Shepherd; United States	35.58
50m Freestyle	S9	Elizabeth Smith; United States	29.55	Daniela Giménez; Argentina	30.43	Elise Morley; United States	30.59
50m Freestyle	S10	María Barrera Zapata; Colombia	29.15	Mariana Gesteira; Brazil	29.43	Arianna Hunsicker; Canada	30.13
50m Freestyle	S11	Nadia Báez; Argentina	34.51	Regiane Silva; Brazil	35.34	Matilde Alcázar; Mexico	35.78
50m Freestyle	S12	Maria Carolina Gomes Santiago; Brazil	27.44	Lucilene da Silva Sousa; Brazil	28.49	Belkis Echarry; Venezuela	30.47
100m Freestyle	S5 (S3-S4)	Joana Neves; Brazil	1:27.21	Ana Noriega; Argentina	1:32.94	Patrícia Pereira; Brazil	1:35.30
100m Freestyle	S6	Sara Vargas Blanco; Colombia	1:17.00	Laila Suzigan; Brazil	1:18.38	Valeria Lopez Gomez; Mexico	1:22.77
100m Freestyle	S7	Naomi Mandujano; Mexico	1:19.20	Krystal Shaw; Canada	1:23.90	Nesbith Mejia; Mexico	1:28.37
100m Freestyle	S8	Cecília Jerônimo de Araújo; Brazil	1:08.18	Paola Ruvalcaba; Mexico	1:12.42	Laura Carolina González Rodríguez; Colombia	1:17.26
100m Freestyle	S9	Natalie Sims; United States	1:06.05	Daniela Giménez; Argentina	1:06.50	Hannah Aspden; United States	1:06.76
100m Freestyle	S10	María Barrera Zapata; Colombia	1:03.33	Stefanny Zapata; Mexico	1:05.31	Mariana Gesteira; Brazil	4:05.85
100m Freestyle	S11	Matilde Alcázar; Mexico	1:15.23	Regiane Silva; Brazil	1:17.21	Nadia Báez; Argentina	1:20.63
100m Freestyle	S12	Maria Carolina Gomes Santiago; Brazil	59.73	Lucilene da Silva Sousa; Brazil	1:02.84	Aspen Shelton; United States	1:06.95
200m Freestyle	S5(S3-S4)	Joana Neves; Brazil	3:14.71	Alyssa Gialamas; United States	3:28.68	Esthefany de Oliveira; Brazil	3:37.03
200m Freestyle	S14	Angela Marina; Canada	2:15.16	Ana Soares de Oliveira; Brazil	2:18.37	Beatriz Carneiro; Brazil	2:21.91
400m Freestyle	S6	Vianney Delgadillo; Mexico	5:38.30	Sara Vargas Blanco; Colombia	5:39.71	Laila Suzigan; Brazil	5:50.63
400m Freestyle	S8 (S7)	Cecília Jerônimo de Araújo; Brazil	5:17.73	Paola Ruvalcaba Nuñez; Mexico	5:18.38	Natalia Guemez; Mexico	5:44.30
400m Freestyle	S9	Hannah Aspden; United States	5:01.05	Madelyn White; United States	5:01.25	Alyssia Crook; United States	5:12.19
400m Freestyle	S10	María Barrera Zapata; Colombia	4:46.38	Stefanny Cristino Zapata; Mexico	4:52.02	Arianna Hunsicker; Canada	5:06.42
400m Freestyle	S11	Matilde Alcázar; Mexico	5:35.91	Laurrie Hermes; United States	5:52.62	Nadia Báez; Argentina	6:45.59
400m Freestyle	S13(S12)	Maria Carolina Gomes Santiago; Brazil	4:59.66	Lucilene da Silva Sousa; Brazil	5:11.60	Belkis Echarry; Venezuela	5:13.09
50m Backstroke	S3(S1-S2)	Edenia Garcia; Brazil	57.02	Maiara Barreto; Brazil	1:00.91	Haidee Aceves; Mexico	1:05.84
50m Backstroke	S5(S4-S5)	Alyssa Gialamas; United States	47.65	Karina Torres; Mexico	51.90	Tisbe de Souza Andrade; Brazil	54.22
100m Backstroke	S6	Sara Vargas Blanco; Colombia	1:33.03	Vianney Delgadillo; Mexico	1:35.85	Myriam Soliman; Canada	1:44.76
100m Backstroke	S7	Abigail Gase; United States	1:33.92	Krystal Shaw; Canada	1:44.82	Nesbith Mejia; Mexico	1:49.10
100m Backstroke	S8	Valentina Muñoz; Chile	1:24.60	Paola Nuñez; Mexico	1:24.77	Cecília Jerônimo de Araújo; Brazil	1:26.12
100m Backstroke	S9	Hannah Aspden; United States	1:13.20	Elizabeth Smith; United States	1:14.57	Amanda Palyo; United States	1:20.23
100m Backstroke	S10	María Barrera Zapata; Colombia	1:13.56	Mariana Gesteira; Brazil	1:13.68	Arianna Hunsicker; Canada	1:15.27
100m Backstroke	S11	Matilde Alcázar; Mexico	1:27.48	Regiane Silva; Brazil	1:32.42	Laurrie Hermes; United States	1:32.80
100m Backstroke	S12	Maria Carolina Gomes Santiago; Brazil	1:13.50	Aspen Shelton; United States	1:15.98	Analuz Pellitero; Argentina	1:19.14
100m Backstroke	S14	Ana Soares de Oliveira; Brazil	1:12.07	Angela Marina; Canada	1:14.81	Leslie Cichocki; United States	1:16.50
50m Breaststroke	SB3(SB1-3)	Patrícia Valle Benitez; Mexico	1:4.46				
100m Breaststroke	SB5 (SB4)	Laila Suzigan; Brazil	2:00.31	Esthefany de Oliveira; Brazil	2:09.52	Ana Noriega; Argentina	2:10.83
100m Breaststroke	SB6	Nesbith Mejia; Mexico	2:05.36	Lourdes Aybar; Dominican Republic	2:06.56	Abigail Nardella; United States	2:10.82
100m Breaststroke	SB7	Naomi Mandujano; Mexico	1:40.22	Haven Shepherd; United States	1:43.39	Natalia Guemez; Mexico	1:47.21
100m Breaststroke	SB8	Madelyn White; United States	1:31.24	Camila Haase Quiros; Costa Rica	1:34.99	Hannah Aspden; United States	1:36.56
100m Breaststroke	SB9	Daniela Giménez; Argentina	1:20.46	Samantha Tubbs; United States	1:21.12	Summer Schmit; United States	1:27.95
100m Breaststroke	SB11	Nadia Báez; Argentina	1:37.48	Matilde Alcázar; Mexico	1:36.56	Laurrie Hermes; United States	1:36.56
100m Breaststroke	SB14	Débora Carneiro; Brazil	1:16.33	Beatriz Carneiro; Brazil	1:17.11	Viviana Barreto; Venezuela	1:28.57
50m Butterfly	S5 (S1-S4)	Joana Neves; Brazil	48.34	Esthefany de Oliveira; Brazil	51.19	Donia Felices Rojas; Peru	1:02.23
50m Butterfly	S6	Sara Vargas Blanco; Colombia	40.48	Nancy Lomeli; Mexico	41.30	Karla Bravo Gonzalez; Mexico	42.00
50m Butterfly	S7	Naomi Mandujano; Mexico	39.38	Nesbith Mejia; Mexico	44.74	Abigail Gase; United States	48.62
100m Butterfly	S8	Cecília Jerônimo de Araújo; Brazil	1:21.69	Laura Carolina González Rodríguez; Colombia	1:24.06	Luz Valdes; Mexico	1:26.65
100m Butterfly	S9	Elizabeth Smith; United States	1:08.79	Daniela Giménez; Argentina	1:12.72	Natalie Sims; United States	1:13.10
100m Butterfly	S14	Angela Marina; Canada	1:12.68	Leslie Cichocki; United States	1:14.95	Emma Van Dyk; Canada	1:18.18
200m Individual Medley	SM5	Esthefany de Oliveira; Brazil	3:54.66	Joana Neves; Brazil	3:57.77	Naiver Ome; Colombia	3:54.10
200m Individual Medley	SM6	Laila Suzigan; Brazil	3:32.45	Vianney Delgadillo; Mexico	3:33.02	Valeria Lopez Gomez; Mexico	3:37.94
200m Individual Medley	SM7	Naomi Mandujano; Mexico	3:17.06	Nesbith Mejia; Mexico	3:37.36	Abigail Gase; United States	3:38.09
200m Individual Medley	SM8	Laura Carolina González Rodríguez; Colombia	3:04.32	Haven Shepherd; United States	3:09.39	Natália Guemez; Mexico	3:11.40
200m Individual Medley	SM9	Daniela Giménez; Argentina	2:41.54	Summer Schmit; United States	2:42.23	Natalie Sims; United States	2:42.94
200m Individual Medley	SM10	Stefanny Zapata; Mexico	2:42.44	María Barrera Zapata; Colombia	2:45.26	Arianna Hunsicker; Canada	2:48.51
200m Individual Medley	SM14	Beatriz Carneiro; Brazil	2:38.29	Débora Carneiro; Brazil	2:39.83	Ana Karolina Soares; Brazil	2:40.70
4x100m Freestyle Relay	34 Points	Mexico; Guadalupe Carillo; Paola Ruvalcaba; Stefanny Zapata; Vianney Delgadillo	4:48.22	United States; Abigail Gase; Elise Morley; Hannah Aspden; Natalie Sims	4:50.24	Brazil; Cecília Jerônimo de Araújo; Joana Neves; Laila Suzigan; Mariana Gesteira	5:02.71
4x100m Medley Relay	34 Points	Mexico; Paola Ruvalcaba; Naomi Mandujano; Luz Valdes; Stefanny Zapata	5:41.57	Brazil; Cecília Jerônimo de Araújo; Laila Suzigan; Maria Dayanne da Silva; Mariana Gesteira	5:52.72	Canada; Arianna Hunsicker; Colleen Cloëtta; Krystal Shaw; Michelle Tovizi	6:23.70

=== Mixed ===
Event	Class	Gold		Silver		Bronze
4x100m Freestyle Relay	49 Points	Aspen Shelton; Carson Sanocki; Laurrie Hermes; Ross Minor; United States	4:33.99	Anabel Moro; Analuz Pellitero; Enzo Fais; Sergio Zayas; Argentina	4:34.73	

== See also ==
- Swimming at the 2019 Pan American Games
