= Swimming at the 2020 Summer Paralympics – Women's 200 metre individual medley SM8 =

Women's 200 metre individual medley SM8 at the XVI Paralympic Games
- Venue: Tokyo Aquatics Centre
- Dates: 28 August 2021
- Competitors: 10 from 8 nations
- Winning time: 2:41.49

Medalists
1st place, gold medalist(s)		Jessica Long	United States
2nd place, silver medalist(s)		Xenia Palazzo	Italy
3rd place, bronze medalist(s)		Mariia Pavlova	RPC

The Women's 200 metre individual medley SM8 event at the 2020 Paralympic Games took place on 28 August 2021, at the Tokyo Aquatics Centre.

== Heats ==
The swimmers with the top eight times, regardless of heat, advanced to the final.

Rank	Heat	Lane	Name	Nationality	Time	Notes
1	2	4	Jessica Long	United States	2:41.83	Q
2	2	5	Mariia Pavlova	RPC	2:52.19	Q
3	1	5	Xenia Palazzo	Italy	2:55.64	Q
4	2	6	Laura Carolina González Rodríguez	Colombia	3:03.23	Q
5	1	3	Mira Jeanne Maack	Germany	3:04.65	Q
6	2	2	Vendula Dušková	Czech Republic	3:06.56	Q
7	1	6	Haven Shepherd	United States	3:08.04	Q
8	1	2	Amalie Vinther	Denmark	3:12.70	Q
-	2	4	Viktoriia Ishchiulova	RPC	DNS	
-	1	4	Nahia Zudaire Borrezo	Spain	DSQ	

== Final ==
Rank	Lane	Name	Nationality	Time	Notes
1st place, gold medalist(s)	4	Jessica Long	United States	2:41.49	
2nd place, silver medalist(s)	3	Xenia Palazzo	Italy	2:47.86	
3rd place, bronze medalist(s)	5	Mariia Pavlova	RPC	2:48.63	
4	6	Laura Carolina González Rodríguez	Colombia	3:03.46	
5	1	Haven Shepherd	United States	3:03.59	
6	2	Mira Jeanne Maack	Germany	3:04.78	
7	8	Amalie Vinther	Denmark	3:11.29	
8	7	Vendula Dušková	Czech Republic	3:14.59	
