= 2023 World Para Swimming Championships – Men's 400 metre freestyle =

The men's 400m freestyle events at the 2023 World Para Swimming Championships were held at the Manchester Aquatics Centre between 31 July and 6 August. 57 swimmers competed across seven classifications; S6, S7, S8, S9, S10, S11 and S13.

== Medalists ==
Event	Gold	Silver	Bronze
S6	Talisson Glock; Brazil	Antonio Fantin; Italy	Raul Gutierrez Bermudez; Mexico
S7	Federico Bicelli; Italy	Iñaki Basiloff; Argentina	Andrii Trusov; Ukraine
S8	Alberto Amodeo; Italy	Xu Haijiao; China	Noah Jaffe; United States
S9	Simone Barlaam; Italy	Ugo Didier; France	Brenden Hall; Australia
S10	Stefano Raimondi; Italy	Bas Takken; Netherlands	Alan Ogorzalek; Poland
S11	David Kratochvil; Czech Republic	Rogier Dorsman; Netherlands	Hua Dongdong; China
S13	Alex Portal; France	Kyrylo Garashchenko; Ukraine	Kylian Portal; France

== Results ==
=== S6 ===
Six swimmers entered the event. A straight final was held on Thursday 3 August.

Record	Swimmer	Time
World Record	Anders Olsson (Sweden)	4:47.75
Championships records	Anders Olsson (Sweden)	4:54.49

Final

Rank	Name	Nation	Result	Notes
1st place, gold medalist(s)	Talisson Glock	Brazil	4:52.42	CR
2nd place, silver medalist(s)	Antonio Fantin	Italy	4:56.30	
3rd place, bronze medalist(s)	Raul Gutierrez Bermudez	Mexico	5:23.46	
4	Jose Gutierrez Bermudez	Mexico	5:29.90	
5	Jesus Gutierrez Bermudez	Mexico	5:30.56	
6	Gary Bejino	Philippines	5:54.86	

=== S7 ===
Six swimmers entered the event. A straight final was held on Tuesday 1 August.

Record	Swimmer	Time
World Record	Mark Malyar (Israel)	4:31.06
Championships records	Mark Malyar (Israel)	4:33.64

Final

Rank	Lane	Name	Nation	Result	Notes
1st place, gold medalist(s)	5	Federico Bicelli	Italy	4:40.55	
2nd place, silver medalist(s)	4	Iñaki Basiloff	Argentina	4:40.96	
3rd place, bronze medalist(s)	3	Andrii Trusov	Ukraine	4:41.57	
4	2	Ernie Gawilan	Philippines	4:59.94	
5	6	Facundo Arregui	Argentina	5:03.00	
6	7	Yurii Shenhur	Ukraine	5:08.74	

=== S8 ===
Eight swimmers entered the event. A straight final was held on Monday 31 July.

Record	Swimmer	Time
World Record	Ollie Hynd (United Kingdom)	4:19.74
Championships records	Ollie Hynd (United Kingdom)	4:24.32

Final

Rank	Lane	Athlete	Nation	Result	Notes
1st place, gold medalist(s)	4	Alberto Amodeo	Italy	4:25.63	
2nd place, silver medalist(s)	8	Xu Haijiao	China	4:32.11	
3rd place, bronze medalist(s)	6	Noah Jaffe	United States	4:35.04	
4	2	Philippe Vachon	Canada	4:38.95	
5	3	Sanz Inigo Llopis	Spain	4:40.64	
6	1	Zach Zona	Canada	4:45.38	
7	7	Sam Downie	Great Britain	4:49.03	
8	5	Matthew Torres	United States	4:49.31	

=== S9 ===
9 swimmers took part in this event, with both the heats and final on Friday 4 August.

Record	Swimmer	Time
World Record	Brenden Hall (United Kingdom)	4:09.93
Championships records	Brenden Hall (United Kingdom)	4:09.93

Heats

Rank	Heat	Lane	Name	Nation	Result	Notes
1	1	4	Ugo Didier	France	4:18.88	
2	1	3	Sam de Visser	Belgium	4:19.37	
3	1	5	Timothy Hodge	Australia	4:20.17	
4	2	5	Brenden Hall	Australia	4:22.77	
5	2	4	Simone Barlaam	Italy	4:22.80	
6	2	3	Jacobo Garrido Brun	Spain	4:26.25	
7	1	6	Maurice Wetekam	Germany	4:33.29	
8	2	6	Barry McClements	Ireland	4:34.58	
9	2	2	Erick Tandazo	Ecuador	4:35.73	

Final

Rank	Athlete	Nation	Result	Notes
1st place, gold medalist(s)	Simone Barlaam	Italy	4:13.62	
2nd place, silver medalist(s)	Ugo Didier	France	4:15.47	
3rd place, bronze medalist(s)	Brenden Hall	Australia	4:15.55	
4	Sam de Visser	Belgium	4:16.35	
5	Timothy Hodge	Australia	4:17.20	
6	Jacobo Garrido Brun	Spain	4:17.71	
7	Barry McClements	Ireland	4:30.58	
8	Maurice Wetekam	Germany	4:33.70	

=== S10 ===
Seven swimmers entered the event. A straight final was held on Wednesday 2 August.

Record	Swimmer	Time
World Record	Maksym Krypak (Ukraine)	3:57.71
Championships records	Maksym Krypak (Ukraine)	4:01.17

Final

Rank	Athlete	Nation	Result	Notes
1st place, gold medalist(s)	Stefano Raimondi	Italy	4:06.96	
2nd place, silver medalist(s)	Bas Takken	Netherlands	4:09.86	
3rd place, bronze medalist(s)	Alan Ogorzalek	Poland	4:14.50	
4	Justin Kaps	Germany	4:17.85	
5	Oliver Carter	Great Britain	4:22.26	
6	William Martin	Australia	4:22.51	
7	Tomas Cordeiro	Portugal	4:26.88	

=== S11 ===
8 swimmers took part in this event, with both the heats and final on Sunday 6 August.

Heats

Rank	Heat	Lane	Name	Nation	Result	Notes
1	2	3	David Kratochvil	Czech Republic	4:40.34	
2	2	4	Rogier Dorsman	Netherlands	4:42.82	
3	1	6	Hua Dongdong	China	4:43.81	
4	1	5	Marco Meneses	Portugal	4:53.32	
5	2	5	Mykhailo Serbin	Ukraine	4:54.46	
6	1	4	Uchu Tomita	Japan	4:58.95	
7	1	3	Matheus Rheine	Brazil	5:09.36	
8	1	2	Sergio Zayas	Argentina	5:15.10	

Final

Rank	Athlete	Nation	Result	Notes
1st place, gold medalist(s)	David Kratochvil	Czech Republic	4:34.37	
2nd place, silver medalist(s)	Rogier Dorsman	Netherlands	4:34.46	
3rd place, bronze medalist(s)	Hua Dongdong	China	4:38.20	
4	Uchu Tomita	Japan	4:38.67	
5	Mykhailo Serbin	Ukraine	4:38.75	
6	Marco Meneses	Portugal	4:40.13	
7	Matheus Rheine	Brazil	5:04.37	
8	Sergio Zayas	Argentina	5:11.20	

=== S13 ===
11 swimmers took part in this event, with both the heats and final on Saturday 5 August.

Heats

Rank	Heat	Lane	Name	Nation	Result	Notes
1	2	4	Alex Portal	France	4:14.53	Q
2	2	2	Nathan Hendricks	South Africa	4:20.40	Q
3	1	4	Kyrylo Garashchenko	Ukraine	4:21.89	Q
4	1	5	Kylian Portal	France	4:23.93	Q
5	2	5	Ivan Salgueiro	Spain	4:25.60	Q
6	2	3	Genki Saito	Japan	4:28.31	Q
7	1	3	Quentin Vieira	France	4:31.08	Q
8	1	6	Philip Hebmüller	Germany	4:31.63	Q
9	2	6	Juan Ferrón	Spain	4:31.82	
10	2	7	Firdavsbek Musabekov	Uzbekistan	4:34.51	
11	1	2	Muzaffar Tursunkhujaev	Uzbekistan	4:37.93	

Final

Rank	Athlete	Nation	Result	Notes
1st place, gold medalist(s)	Alex Portal	France	4:01.37	
2nd place, silver medalist(s)	Kyrylo Garashchenko	Ukraine	4:08.50	
3rd place, bronze medalist(s)	Kylian Portal	France	4:15.94	
4	Nathan Hendricks	South Africa	4:21.59	
5	Ivan Salgueiro	Spain	4:23.28	
6	Genki Saito	Japan	4:26.41	
7	Quentin Vieira	France	4:31.64	
8	Philip Hebmüller	Germany	4:32.66	
