= 2022 World Para Swimming Championships – Men's 400 metre freestyle =

The men's 400m freestyle events at the 2022 World Para Swimming Championships were held at the Penteada Olympic Swimming Complex in Madeira between 12 and 18 June.

== Medalists ==
Event	Gold	Silver	Bronze
S6	Antonio Fantin; Italy	Juan Jose Gutierrez Bermudez; Mexico	Talisson Glock; Brazil
S7	Iñaki Basiloff; Argentina	Federico Bicelli; Italy	Andrii Trusov; Ukraine
S8	Alberto Amodeo; Italy	Matthew Torres; United States	Robert Griswold; United States
S9	Simone Barlaam; Italy	Ugo Didier; France	Brenden Hall; Australia
S10	Stefano Raimondi; Italy	Bas Takken; Netherlands	Alec Elliot; Canada
S11	Rogier Dorsman; Netherlands	Mykhailo Serbin; Ukraine	Uchu Tomita; Japan
S13	Kyrylo Garashchenko; Ukraine	Alex Portal; France	Genki Saito; Japan

== Results ==
=== S6 ===
Final

Six swimmers from five nations took part.

Rank	Name	Nation	Result	Notes
1st place, gold medalist(s)	Antonio Fantin	Italy	4:57.72	
2nd place, silver medalist(s)	Juan Jose Gutierrez Bermudez	Mexico	5:07.54	
3rd place, bronze medalist(s)	Talisson Glock	Brazil	5:07.87	
4	Raul Gutierrez Bermudez	Mexico	5:29.21	
5	Morgan Ray	United States	5:30.88	
6	Daniel Videira	Portugal	5:38.84	

=== S7 ===
Final

Seven swimmers from six nations took part.

Rank	Name	Nation	Result	Notes
1st place, gold medalist(s)	Iñaki Basiloff	Argentina	4:38.37	AM
2nd place, silver medalist(s)	Federico Bicelli	Italy	4:43.14	
3rd place, bronze medalist(s)	Andrii Trusov	Ukraine	4:43.44	
4	Facundo Arregui	Argentina	5:01.22	
5	Rudy Garcia-Tolson	United States	5:12.42	
6	Niranjan Mukundan	India	5:16.95	
7	Ádám Szabady	Hungary	5:43.61	

=== S8 ===
Final

Eight swimmers from six nations took part.

Rank	Name	Nation	Result	Notes
1st place, gold medalist(s)	Alberto Amodeo	Italy	4:27.76	
2nd place, silver medalist(s)	Matthew Torres	United States	4:27.84	AM
3rd place, bronze medalist(s)	Robert Griswold	United States	4:33.37	
4	Iñigo Llopis Sanz	Spain	4:43.43	
5	Philippe Vachon	Canada	4:49.16	
6	Zach Zona	Canada	4:51.24	
7	Sam Downie	United Kingdom	4:51.62	
8	Facundo Mariano Signorini	Argentina	4:52.29	
