= Felipe Vila Real =

Brazilian Paralympic swimmer

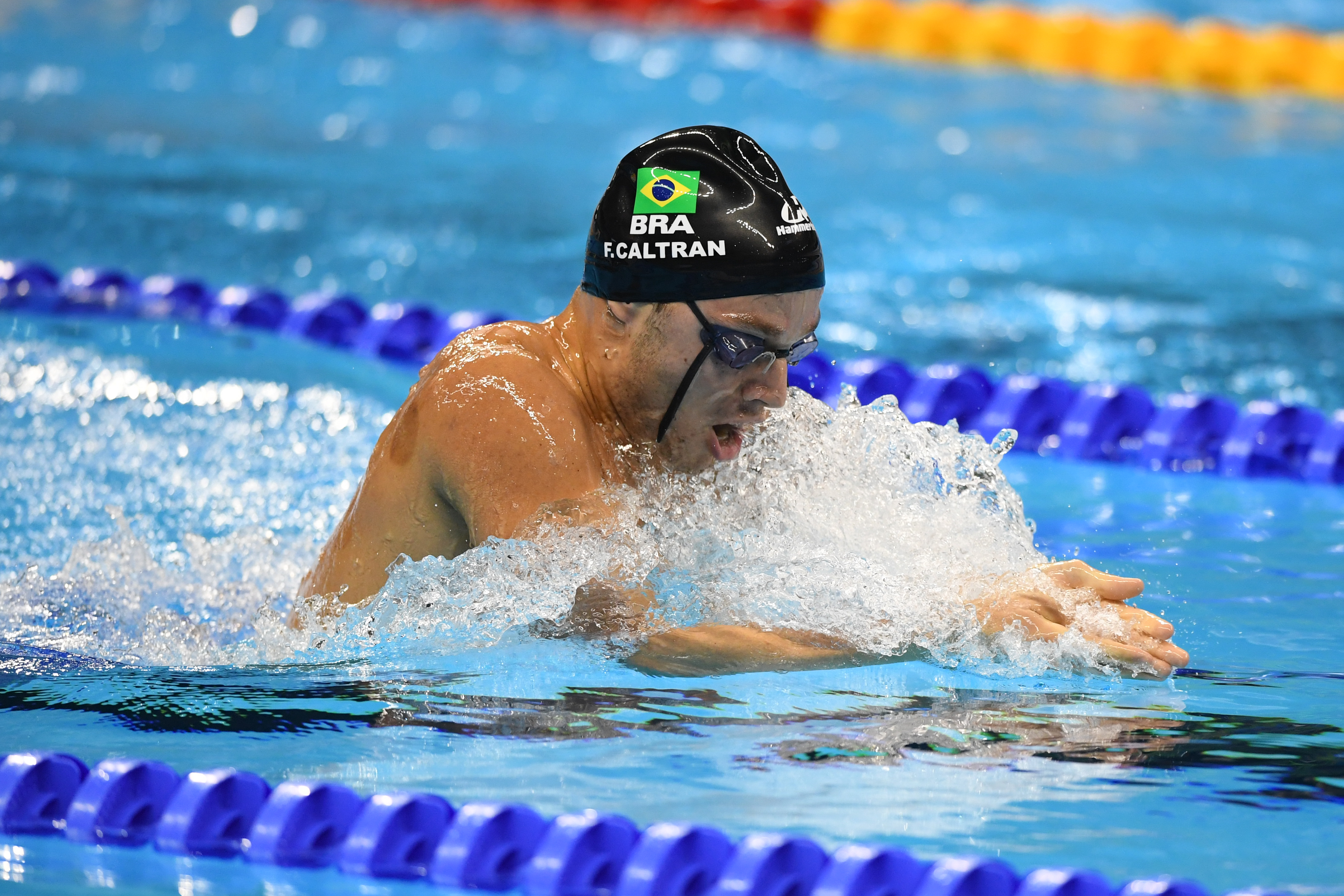
- Vila Real at the 2016 Summer Paralympics

Personal information
- Full name: Felipe Caltran Vila Real
- Nationality: Brazilian
- Born: 13 February 1997 (age 29) Santa Rita do Passa Quatro, São Paulo, Brazil

Sport
- Sport: Paralympic swimming
- Disability class: S14
- Club: Associacao Paraolimpica de Indaiatuba
Medal record
Representing Brazil
Paralympic Games
| Bronze medal – third place | 2020 Tokyo | mixed 4×100 m freestyle relay S14 |
Parapan American Games
| Gold medal – first place | 2015 Toronto | 200 m freestyle S14 |
| Silver medal – second place | 2015 Toronto | 100 m breaststroke SB14 |
| Silver medal – second place | 2019 Lima | 200 m freestyle S14 |
| Bronze medal – third place | 2019 Lima | 100 m backstroke S14 |
| Bronze medal – third place | 2019 Lima | 100 m breaststroke S14 |
| Bronze medal – third place | 2019 Lima | 100 m butterfly S14 |
| Bronze medal – third place | 2019 Lima | 200 m ind. medley SM14 |

Felipe Caltran Vila Real (born 13 February 1997) is a Brazilian Paralympic swimmer. He represented Brazil at the 2016 and 2020 Summer Paralympics.

== Career ==
Vila Real represented Brazil at the 2015 Parapan American Games and won a gold medal and a silver medal. He again represented Brazil at the 2019 Parapan American Games and won a silver medal and four bronze medals.

Vila Real represented Brazil at the 2016 Summer Paralympics. He again represented Brazil at the 2020 Summer Paralympics and won a bronze medal in the mixed 4 × 100 metre freestyle relay 49pts event.
