= Swimming at the 2020 Summer Paralympics – Women's 100 metre butterfly S8 =

Women's 100 metre butterfly S8 at the XVI Paralympic Games
- Venue: Tokyo Aquatics Centre
- Dates: 3 September 2021
- Competitors: 8 from 8 nations

Medalists
| 1st place, gold medalist(s) | | Jessica Long | United States |
| 2nd place, silver medalist(s) | | Viktoriia Ishchiulova | RPC |
| 3rd place, bronze medalist(s) | | Laura Carolina González Rodríguez | Colombia |

The Women's 100 metre butterfly S8 event at the 2020 Paralympic Games took place on 3 September 2021, at the Tokyo Aquatics Centre.

== Final ==
| Rank | Lane | Name | Nationality | Time | Notes |
|---|---|---|---|---|---|
| 1st place, gold medalist(s) | 4 | Jessica Long | United States | 1:09.87 | |
| 2nd place, silver medalist(s) | 5 | Viktoriia Ishchiulova | RPC | 1:10.80 | |
| 3rd place, bronze medalist(s) | 3 | Laura Carolina González Rodríguez | Colombia | 1:20.93 | |
| 4 | 6 | Nahia Zudaire Borrezo | Spain | 1:21.01 | |
| 5 | 2 | Luz Kerena López Valdes | Mexico | 1:24.05 | |
| 6 | 1 | Cecília Jerônimo de Araújo | Brazil | 1:26.26 | |
| 7 | 7 | Morgan Bird | Canada | 1:28.05 | |
| 8 | 8 | Lourdes Alejandra Aybar Díaz | Dominican Republic | 1:44.12 | |
