= Daniel Giraldo Correa =

Colombian Paralympic swimmer

Personal information
- Born: 1 March 1984 (age 42) Medellín, Colombia
- Height: 1.75 m (5 ft 9 in)

Sport
- Country: Colombia
- Sport: Para swimming
- Disability: Stargardt's disease
- Disability class: S12
Medal record
Men's para swimming
Representing Colombia
Event	1st	2nd	3rd
Parapan American Games	9	4	4
South American Para Games	2	0	1
Total	11	4	5
Parapan American Games
Gold medal – first place	2011 Guadalajara	50 m freestyle S12
Gold medal – first place	2011 Guadalajara	100 m freestyle S12
Gold medal – first place	2011 Guadalajara	100 m breaststroke SB12
Gold medal – first place	2011 Guadalajara	200 m medley SM12
Gold medal – first place	2019 Lima	100 m freestyle S12
Gold medal – first place	2019 Lima	100 m backstroke S12
Gold medal – first place	2019 Lima	100 m breaststroke SB12
Gold medal – first place	2019 Lima	200 m medley SM12
Gold medal – first place	2023 Santiago	100 m breaststroke SB12
Silver medal – second place	2023 Santiago	100 m freestyle S12
Silver medal – second place	2023 Santiago	100 m butterfly S12
Silver medal – second place	2023 Santiago	200 m medley SM13
Silver medal – second place	2023 Santiago	4×100 m mixed medley relay 49 pts
Bronze medal – third place	2019 Lima	50 m freestyle S12
Bronze medal – third place	2019 Lima	100 m butterfly S12
Bronze medal – third place	2023 Santiago	100 m backstroke S12
Bronze medal – third place	2023 Santiago	4×100 m mixed freestyle relay 49 pts
South American Para Games
Gold medal – first place	2026 Valledupar	100 m breaststroke SB12
Gold medal – first place	2026 Valledupar	400 m freestyle S12
Bronze medal – third place	2026 Valledupar	100 m butterfly S12

Daniel Giraldo Correa (born 1 March 1984) is a Colombian Paralympic swimmer who competes at international elite swimming competitions. He is an eight-time Parapan American Games champion and has competed at the Paralympic Games three times.
