= Paola Ruvalcaba =

Mexican Paralympic swimmer

Personal information
- Full name: Paola Lizette Ruvalcaba Núñez
- Born: 25 May 1998 (age 28) Guadalajara, Mexico

Sport
- Sport: Paralympic swimming
- Disability: Osteomyelitis
- Disability class: S8
Medal record
Representing Mexico
Parapan American Games
| Gold medal – first place | 2019 Lima | 4x100m freestyle relay 34pts |
| Gold medal – first place | 2019 Lima | 4x100m medley relay |
| Gold medal – first place | 2023 Santiago | 100m backstroke S8 |
| Silver medal – second place | 2019 Lima | 50m freestyle S8 |
| Silver medal – second place | 2019 Lima | 100m freestyle S8 |
| Silver medal – second place | 2019 Lima | 400m freestyle S8 |
| Silver medal – second place | 2019 Lima | 100m backstroke S8 |
| Silver medal – second place | 2023 Santiago | 400m freestyle S8 |

Paola Lizette Ruvalcaba Núñez (born 25 May 1998) is a Mexican Paralympic swimmer who competes in international swimming competitions. She is a three-time Parapan American Games champion in backstroke. She competed at the 2024 Summer Paralympics but did not medal.

Ruvalcaba began swimming at eleven years old as part of rehabilitation for her disability. She was inspired to take up Paralympic swimming by her role model American swimmer Jessica Long.
