= Sam de Visser =

Belgian Paralympic swimmer

Personal information
- Nationality: Belgian
- Born: 26 August 2003 (age 23)

Sport
- Sport: Swimming
- Coach: Greg Planckaert
Medal record
Representing Belgium
IPC European Championships
Bronze medal – third place	2024 Funchal	400 m freestyle S9

Sam de Visser (born 26 August 2003) is a Belgian Paralympic swimmer. He competes in classification S9 (S9, SB8 and SM9).

== Biography ==
de Visser was born with just 4 fingers on his right hand and a not fully developed right leg that was amputated below the knee after birth. He received his first prosthetic leg age 4 and tried out different sports after that: he played football at a very young age and his parents forced him to take swimming lessons when he was 6 as they found it important that he would be able "to save himself". Age 8, he switched to swimming only as he was restricted in his football club to attending training sessions only and was not allowed to partake in competition football with his prosthetic leg.

de Visser has an older and a younger brother, lives in Lommel, Belgium and trains in Bruges, Belgium.

== Personal ==
de Visser studies business management at the Howest University of Applied Sciences in Bruges, Belgium.

== Competitions ==
de Visser's first international championships were the 2020 World Para Swimming European Open Championships in Funchal, Madeira, Portugal.

de Visser's first world championships were the 2022 World Para Swimming Championships in Madeira, Portugal where he finished 6th in both the men's 100 metres backstroke S9 and 400 m metres Freestyle S9.

A year later, he came close to winning his first international championship medal at the 2023 World Para Swimming Championships in Manchester, UK finishing 4th in the men's 400 metre freestyle S9.

In April 2024 he did win that first international championship medal, a bronze medal at the 2024 World Para Swimming European Open Championships in Funchal, Madeira in his favorite discipline, the 400 metres freestyle.

Later that year, he participated in the 2024 Summer Paralympics in Paris, France. He finished 2nd in his heat of the 400 metres freestyle S9 and qualified for the final in which he finished 6th.

== Awards ==
In 2019 de Visser was winner of the ENGIE Talent of the Year award. The award was handed out to him by Her Royal Highness Princess Astrid during a special and prestigious edition of the Belgian Paralympic Sports Awards celebrating the 60th birthday of the Paralympic movement in Belgium.
