= Taylor Winnett =

American Paralympic swimmer (born 1999)

Personal information
- Nationality: American
- Born: April 24, 1999 (age 27) Hershey, Pennsylvania, U.S.

Sport
- Sport: Paralympic swimming
- Disability: Ehlers–Danlos syndrome
- Disability class: S10, SM10, SB9
Medal record
Women's paralympic swimming
Representing United States
Parapan American Games
Gold medal – first place	2023 Santiago	100 m backstroke S10
Gold medal – first place	2023 Santiago	100 m butterfly S10
Gold medal – first place	2023 Santiago	200 m ind. medley SM10
Silver medal – second place	2023 Santiago	100 m freestyle S10
Silver medal – second place	2023 Santiago	400 m freestyle S10
Silver medal – second place	2023 Santiago	100 m breaststroke SB9
Silver medal – second place	2023 Santiago	4 × 100 m relay 34 pts

Taylor Winnett (born April 24, 1999) is an American Paralympic swimmer who represented the United States at the 2024 Summer Paralympics.

== Early life and education ==
Winnett was born on April 24, 1999, in Hershey, Pennsylvania. She committed to swim at Loyola University Maryland, the summer before her senior year in high school. In August 2016, she flipped over on a jet ski and herniated two discs in her spine. In October 2016, she fell during calculus class and suffered a fractured vertebrae and a Tarlov cyst at the base of her spine. She was then diagnosed with Ehlers–Danlos syndrome and Postural orthostatic tachycardia syndrome.

She was forced to complete her senior year of high school online and decommitted from college swimming. Her physical therapist at Johns Hopkins Hospital suggested she start swimming again, and her swim coach at Loyola suggested she get involved in Para swimming. After two-and-a-half years of pain management and rehabilitation, she received her classification in 2019 at the Bill Keating Cincinnati Para Swimming Open.

== Career ==
Winnett represented the United States at the 2023 Parapan American Games where she was the most decorated U.S. athlete at the games with seven medals. She won three gold medals and four silver medals. During the 100 meter butterfly S10 event she set a Parapan American Games record with a time of 1:09.35.

On June 30, 2024, Winnett was named to team USA's roster to compete at the 2024 Summer Paralympics.

== Personal life ==
Winnett began swimming at the age of four, her mother was a swim coach, while her older sister was also a swimmer. She is married to Spc. Jeric Winnett, a combat engineer with the 595th Sapper Company in the Army.
