= Ana Noriega =

Argentine Paralympic swimmer

Personal information
- Born: 18 May 1987 (age 39) Arroyito, Córdoba, Argentina

Sport
- Sport: Paralympic swimming
- Disability: Cerebral palsy
- Disability class: S5
Medal record
Representing Argentina
Parapan American Games
Silver medal – second place	2019 Lima	100m freestyle S5
Bronze medal – third place	2019 Lima	50m freestyle S5
Bronze medal – third place	2019 Lima	100m breaststroke SB5
Bronze medal – third place	2023 Santiago	100m freestyle S5
Bronze medal – third place	2023 Santiago	200m freestyle S5

Ana Elizabeth "Eli" Noriega (born 18 May 1987) is an Argentine Paralympic swimmer who competes in international swimming competitions. She is a multiple Parapan American Games medalist and has competed at the 2020 and 2024 Summer Paralympics.
