= Zachary Shattuck =

American Paralympic swimmer (born 1996)

Personal information
- Born: March 20, 1996 (age 30)
- Home town: Mount Airy, Maryland, U.S.
- Height: 4 ft 6 in (137 cm)

Sport
- Sport: Paralympic swimming
- Disability class: S6, SB6, SM6
- College team: Frostburg State University
Medal record
Men's para swimming
Representing the United States
Paralympic Games
Silver medal – second place	2024 Paris	Mixed 4×50 m freestyle relay 20 pts
World Championships
Bronze medal – third place	2025 Singapore	Mixed 4×50 m freestyle relay 20pts
Parapan American Games
Silver medal – second place	2019 Lima	100m breaststroke SB6
Silver medal – second place	2023 Santiago	100m breaststroke SB6
Bronze medal – third place	2015 Toronto	100m backstroke S6
Bronze medal – third place	2019 Lima	50m butterfly S6
Bronze medal – third place	2019 Lima	200m individual medley SM6
Bronze medal – third place	2023 Santiago	50m butterfly S6

Zachary "Zach" Shattuck (born March 20, 1996) is an American Paralympic swimmer.

== Career ==
He previously competed at the 2020 Summer Paralympics in Tokyo. He qualified for the 2024 Summer Paralympics in swimming, having competed at the 2024 US Paralympic Swimming Team Trials in Minneapolis where he placed first in the 100 meter freestyle and 50 meter butterfly.
