= Naomi Mandujano =

Mexican Paralympic swimmer

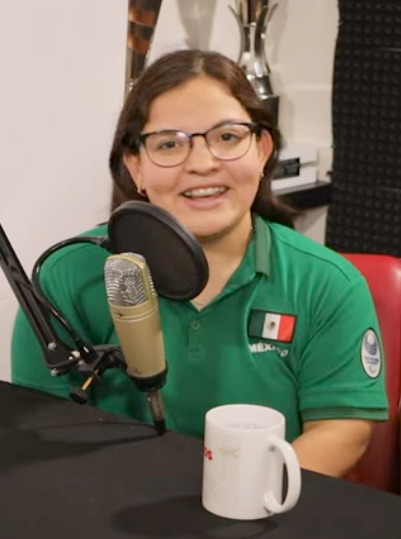
- In a 2024 interview

Personal information
- Full name: Naomi Somellera Mandujano
- Born: 4 September 1998 (age 27) Comalcalco, Mexico

Sport
- Sport: Paralympic swimming
- Disability class: S7, SB7, SM7
Medal record
Representing Mexico
World Championships
Gold medal – first place	2017 Mexico City	50m butterfly
Silver medal – second place	2017 Mexico City	100m breaststroke SB7
Bronze medal – third place	2022 Funchal	100m breaststroke SB7
Parapan American Games
Gold medal – first place	2019 Lima	50m freestyle S7
Gold medal – first place	2019 Lima	100m freestyle S7
Gold medal – first place	2019 Lima	50m butterfly S7
Gold medal – first place	2019 Lima	100m breaststroke SB7
Gold medal – first place	2019 Lima	200m individual medley SM7
Gold medal – first place	2019 Lima	4x100m medley relay 34pts
Silver medal – second place	2023 Santiago	100m breaststroke SB7
Silver medal – second place	2023 Santiago	4x100m medley relay 20pts
Bronze medal – third place	2023 Santiago	50m butterfly S7

Naomi Somellera Mandujano (born 4 September 1998) is a Mexican Paralympic swimmer who competes in international swimming competitions. She has won six gold medals at the 2019 Parapan American Games and has competed at the 2020 and 2024 Summer Paralympics.
