= María Barrera Zapata =

Colombian Paralympic swimmer (born 2001)

Personal information
- Born: September 3, 2001 (age 24) Cali, Colombia

Sport
- Sport: Para swimming
- Disability: Bilateral tibia hemimelia
- Disability class: S10, SM10
Medal record
Representing Colombia
Women's para swimming
Event	1st	2nd	3rd
World Championships	0	2	0
Parapan American Games	7	1	4
South American Para Games	4	1	0
Total	11	4	4
World Championships
Silver medal – second place	2022 Madeira	50 m freestyle S10
Silver medal – second place	2023 Manchester	100 m freestyle S10
Parapan American Games
Gold medal – first place	2019 Lima	50 m freestyle S10
Gold medal – first place	2019 Lima	100 m freestyle S10
Gold medal – first place	2019 Lima	100 m backstroke S10
Gold medal – first place	2019 Lima	400 m freestyle S10
Gold medal – first place	2023 Santiago	50 m freestyle S10
Gold medal – first place	2023 Santiago	100 m freestyle S10
Gold medal – first place	2023 Santiago	400 m freestyle S10
Silver medal – second place	2019 Lima	200 m medley SM10
Bronze medal – third place	2023 Santiago	100 m backstroke S10
Bronze medal – third place	2023 Santiago	100 m butterfly S10
Bronze medal – third place	2023 Santiago	4×100 m mixed freestyle relay 34 pts
Bronze medal – third place	2023 Santiago	4×100 m mixed medley relay 34 pts
South American Para Games
Gold medal – first place	2026 Valledupar	100 m freestyle S10
Gold medal – first place	2026 Valledupar	100 m butterfly S10
Gold medal – first place	2026 Valledupar	400 m freestyle S10
Gold medal – first place	2026 Valledupar	4×100 m mixed freestyle relay 34 pts
Silver medal – second place	2026 Valledupar	4×100 m mixed medley relay 34 pts

María Paula Barrera Zapata (born September 3, 2001) is a Colombian Paralympic swimmer who competes in international swimming competitions. She is a seven-time Parapan American Games champion, two-time World silver medalist and has competed at the 2020 Summer Paralympics.
