= Kyrylo Garashchenko =

Ukrainian Paralympic swimmer (born 1998)

Personal information
- Born: 16 April 1998 (age 28) Zaporozhye, Ukraine

Sport
- Sport: Swimming
Medal record
Men's swimming
Representing Ukraine
Paralympic Games
Silver medal – second place	2020 Tokyo	400 m freestyle S13
Bronze medal – third place	2020 Tokyo	mixed 4×100 m freestyle relay 49pts
World Championships
Gold medal – first place	2022 Madeira	100 m freestyle S13
Gold medal – first place	2022 Madeira	400 m freestyle S13
Silver medal – second place	2022 Madeira	50 m freestyle S13
Silver medal – second place	2022 Madeira	200 m medley SM13
Silver medal – second place	2023 Manchester	400 m freestyle S13
Bronze medal – third place	2023 Manchester	200 m medley SM13
European Championships
Silver medal – second place	2024 Madeira	400 m freestyle S13

Kyrylo Garashchenko (Ukrainian: Кирило Денисович Гаращенко; born 16 April 1998 in Zaporozhye) is a Ukrainian Paralympic swimmer. At the 2020 Summer Paralympics, he won silver in the men's 400 metre freestyle S13 event, and bronze in the mixed 4 × 100 metre freestyle relay 49pts event.
