= Swimming at the 2016 Summer Paralympics – Men's 4 × 100 metre freestyle relay 34pts =

Men's 4 × 100 metre freestyle relay - 34 points at the XV Paralympic Games
- Venue: Olympic Aquatics Stadium
- Dates: 15 September 2016
- Competitors: from 7 nations

Medalists
1st place, gold medalist(s)		Ukraine (UKR)
2nd place, silver medalist(s)		Brazil (BRA)
3rd place, bronze medalist(s)		China (CHN)

The men's 4 × 100 metre freestyle relay - 34 points swimming events for the 2016 Summer Paralympics took place at the Rio Olympic Stadium on 15 September 2016.

== Competition format ==
Relay teams are based on a point score. The sport class of an individual swimmer is worth the actual number value i.e. sport class S6 is worth six points, sport class S12 is worth twelve points, and so on. The total of all the competitors must add up to 34 points or less.

== Records ==
Prior to the competition, the World record was as follows:

World record	Russia	3:48.10	Glasgow, Great Britain	17 July 2015
Paralympic record	Australia	3:50.17	London, Great Britain	2 September 2012

== Final ==
20:43 9 September 2016:

Rank	Lane	Name	Nationality	Time	Notes
1st place, gold medalist(s)	6	Oleksandr Komarov (S6); Maksym Krypak (S10); Bohdan Hrynenko (S8); Denys Dubrov (S10)	Ukraine	3:48.11	
2nd place, silver medalist(s)	4	Daniel Dias (S5); André Brasil (S10); Ruiter Silva (S9); Phelipe Rodrigues (S10)	Brazil	3:48.98	
3rd place, bronze medalist(s)	2	Maodang Song (S8); Haijao Xu (S8); Furong Lin (S10); Yinan Huang (S8)	China	3:50.41	
4	5	Oliver Hynd (S8); Craig Josef (S8); Matthew Wylie (S9); Lewis White (S9)	Great Britain	3:51.54	
5	3	Timothy Disken (S9); Matthew Levy (S7); Blake Cochrane (S8); Rowan Crothers (S10)	Australia	3:51.96	
6	1	Tye Dutcher (S10); Evan Austin (S8); Rudy Garcia-Tolson (S8); Robert Griswold (S8)	United States	4:11.00	
7	7	Alex Elliot (S10); Nathan Clement (S6); Zack McAlister (S8); Nathan Stein (S10)	Canada	4:12.60	
