= Miguel Ángel Rincón =

Colombian Paralympic swimmer

Personal information
- Born: 31 March 1994 (age 32) Bucaramanga, Colombia

Sport
- Country: Colombia
- Sport: Para swimming
- Disability: Paraplegia
- Disability class: S5
Medal record
Men's para swimming
Representing Colombia
Event	1st	2nd	3rd
World Championships	0	0	1
Parapan American Games	0	6	5
South American Para Games	1	0	1
Total	1	6	7
World Championships
Bronze medal – third place	2022 Madeira	100 m breaststroke SB4
Parapan American Games
Silver medal – second place	2019 Lima	50 m freestyle S5
Silver medal – second place	2019 Lima	100 m freestyle S5
Silver medal – second place	2019 Lima	50 m butterfly S5
Silver medal – second place	2019 Lima	100 m breaststroke SB4
Silver medal – second place	2023 Santiago	200 m freestyle S5
Silver medal – second place	2023 Santiago	100 m breaststroke SB4
Bronze medal – third place	2019 Lima	50 m backstroke S5
Bronze medal – third place	2019 Lima	200 m freestyle S5
Bronze medal – third place	2023 Santiago	100 m freestyle S5
Bronze medal – third place	2023 Santiago	4×50 m mixed freestyle relay 20 pts
Bronze medal – third place	2023 Santiago	4×50 m mixed medley relay 20 pts
South American Para Games
Gold medal – first place	2026 Valledupar	200 m freestyle S4-S5
Bronze medal – third place	2026 Valledupar	100 m breaststroke SB4

Miguel Ángel Rincón Narvaez (born 31 March 1994) is a Colombian Paralympic swimmer who competes in international swimming competitions. He is a six-time Parapan American Games medalist winning four silvers and two bronzes and a World bronze medalist.

== Firearm accident ==
When Rincón was nine, he was playing his PlayStation in his house and was looking through a drawer of his collection of the console's cassettes. He picked up a game and played the game on his PlayStation until he heard a pile of objects fall onto the floor, Rincón got distracted and looked at the mess on the floor, he got frightened when he saw a firearm in amongst the items. It was the first time that he had seen one and he didn't know where it came from and why it was there. He picked up the gun and it shot him in the chest and the bullet came out of his back.

He was found unconscious on the floor in his blood, he had also vomited blood and was taken to hospital where he had only one and a half litres of blood left in his body. He had reconstructive surgery on his stomach and digestive system, he had an operation on his pancreas, liver and a part of his lung, the bullet shrapnel was very close to his heart which developed a mild infection and surgeons successfully removed the shrapnel. Following his major surgeries, the doctors were surprised in how Rincón had survived the horrific gunshot that almost killed him however it left him with a spinal cord injury and he was unable to walk again.
