= Laila Suzigan =

Brazilian Paralympic swimmer

Personal information
- Full name: Laila Suzigan Abate
- Born: 2 August 2000 (age 25) Uberlândia, Brazil
- Height: 1.52 m (5 ft 0 in)
- Weight: 48 kg (106 lb)

Sport
- Country: Brazil
- Sport: Paralympic swimming
- Disability: Spastic paraparesis
- Disability class: S6, SB5, SM6
Medal record
Paralympic swimming
Representing Brazil
Paralympic Games
Bronze medal – third place	2020 Tokyo	4x50m freestyle relay 20pts
World Championships
Silver medal – second place	2022 Madeira	400m freestyle S6
Bronze medal – third place	2025 Singapore	100m breaststroke SB5
Parapan American Games
Gold medal – first place	2019 Lima	100m breaststroke SB5
Gold medal – first place	2019 Lima	200m individual medley SM6
Gold medal – first place	2023 Santiago	100m breaststroke SB5
Gold medal – first place	2023 Santiago	50m freestyle S6
Gold medal – first place	2023 Santiago	400m freestyle S6
Gold medal – first place	2023 Santiago	4x100m medley relay 20pts
Gold medal – first place	2023 Santiago	4x100m freestyle relay 20pts
Silver medal – second place	2019 Lima	50m freestyle S6
Silver medal – second place	2019 Lima	100m freestyle S6
Silver medal – second place	2019 Lima	4x100m medley relay 34pts
Silver medal – second place	2023 Santiago	50m butterfly S6
Silver medal – second place	2023 Santiago	200m medley SM6
Bronze medal – third place	2019 Lima	400m freestyle S6
Bronze medal – third place	2019 Lima	4x100m freestyle relay 34pts

Laila Suzigan Abate (born 2 August 2000) is a Brazilian Paralympic swimmer who competes in international swimming competitions. She is a Paralympic bronze medalist.

== Personal life ==
Suzigan was diagnosed with hereditary spastic paraparesis, a rare and progressive disability, as a result, she struggles walking short distances and is mainly wheelchair dependent.
