= Mayara Petzold =

Brazilian Paralympic swimmer

Personal information
- Full name: Mayara do Amaral Petzold
- Born: 2 April 2002 (age 24)
- Home town: Uberlândia, Brazil

Sport
- Country: Brazil
- Sport: Paralympic swimming
- Disability class: S6, SM6
Medal record
Women's para swimming
Representing Brazil
Paralympic Games
Bronze medal – third place	2024 Paris	50 m butterfly S6
World Championships
Gold medal – first place	2025 Singapore	Mixed 4×50 m medley relay 20pts
Silver medal – second place	2025 Singapore	Mixed 4×50 m freestyle relay 20pts
Bronze medal – third place	2025 Singapore	50 m butterfly S6
Parapan American Games
Gold medal – first place	2023 Santiago	50 m butterfly S6
Gold medal – first place	2023 Santiago	4×50 m medley relay 20pts
Silver medal – second place	2023 Santiago	400 m freestyle S6
Bronze medal – third place	2023 Santiago	50 m freestyle S6
Bronze medal – third place	2023 Santiago	200 m ind. medley SM6

Mayara do Amaral Petzold (born 2 April 2002) is a Brazilian Paralympic swimmer. She represented Brazil at the 2024 Summer Paralympics.

== Career ==
Petzold represented Brazil at the 2024 Summer Paralympics and won a bronze medal in the 50 metre butterfly S6 event.
