= Ruiter Silva =

Personal information
- Nationality: Brazil
- Born: 15 December 1992 (age 33) Catalão, Brazil

Sport
- Disability class: S9
Medal record
Representing Brazil
Paralympic Games
Gold medal – first place	2016 Rio de Janeiro	4 × 100 metre freestyle relay
Parapan American Games
Gold medal – first place	2015 Toronto	400m freestyle S9
Gold medal – first place	2015 Toronto	200m individual medley SM9
Gold medal – first place	2015 Toronto	4×100m freestyle relay
Gold medal – first place	2019 Lima	50m Freestyle S9
Gold medal – first place	2019 Lima	100m Freestyle S9
Gold medal – first place	2019 Lima	4x100m Freestyle Relay
Silver medal – second place	2015 Toronto	100m freestyle S9
Silver medal – second place	2019 Lima	400m Freestyle S9 (S8)
Silver medal – second place	2019 Lima	100m Butterfly S9)
Silver medal – second place	2019 Lima	200m Individual Medley S9)
Bronze medal – third place	2015 Toronto	50m freestyle S9

Ruiter Silva (born 15 December 1992) is a Brazilian Paralympic swimmer and triathlete who won a silver medal in the 4 × 100 metre freestyle relay at the 2016 Summer Paralympics with Daniel Dias, André Brasil and Phelipe Rodrigues. He also competed at the 2020 Summer Olympics. He has won 11 Parapan American Games medals, including 6 golds.

Silva was born with a congenital malformation in his left hand took up swimming in 2009.
