= Swimming at the 2020 Summer Paralympics – Mixed 4 × 100 metre freestyle relay 49pts =

Mixed 4 × 100 metre freestyle relay 49pts at the XVI Paralympic Games
- Venue: Tokyo Aquatics Centre
- Dates: 31 August 2021
- Competitors: from 6 nations

Medalists
1st place, gold medalist(s)		RPC (RPC)
2nd place, silver medalist(s)		Brazil (BRA)
3rd place, bronze medalist(s)		Ukraine (UKR)

The mixed 4 × 100 metre freestyle relay 49pts swimming event for the 2020 Summer Paralympics took place at the Tokyo Aquatics Centre on 31 August 2021.

== Competition format ==
Relay teams are based on a point score. The sport class of an individual swimmer is worth the actual number value i.e. sport class S6 is worth six points, sport class S12 is worth twelve points, and so on. The total of all the competitors must add up to 49 points or less.

== Final ==
Rank	Lane	Nation	Swimmers	Time	Notes
1st place, gold medalist(s)	3	RPC	Ilnur Garipov (S11); Anna Krivshina (S13); Daria Pikalova (S12); Vladimir Sotnikov (S13)	3:53.79	PR
2nd place, silver medalist(s)	5	Brazil	Wendell Pereira (S11); Douglas Matera (S13); Lucilene da Silva (S12); Maria Carolina Santiago (S12)	3:54.95	
3rd place, bronze medalist(s)	4	Ukraine	Maryna Piddubna (S11); Maksym Veraksa (S12); Anna Stetsenko (S13); Kyrylo Garashchenko (S13)	3:55.15	
4	6	Spain	José Ramón Cantero Elvira (S11); María Delgado (S12); Ariadna Edo Beltrán (S13); Iván Salguero (S13)	4:03.38	
5	2	Japan	Uchu Tomita (S11); Genki Saito (S13); Tomomi Ishiura (S11); Ayano Tsujiuchi (S13)	4:08.86	
6	7	China	Hua Dongdong (S11); Li Guizhi (S11); Cai Liwen (S11); Yang Bozun (S11)	4:18.60	
