= Ilnur Garipov =

Russian Paralympic swimmer

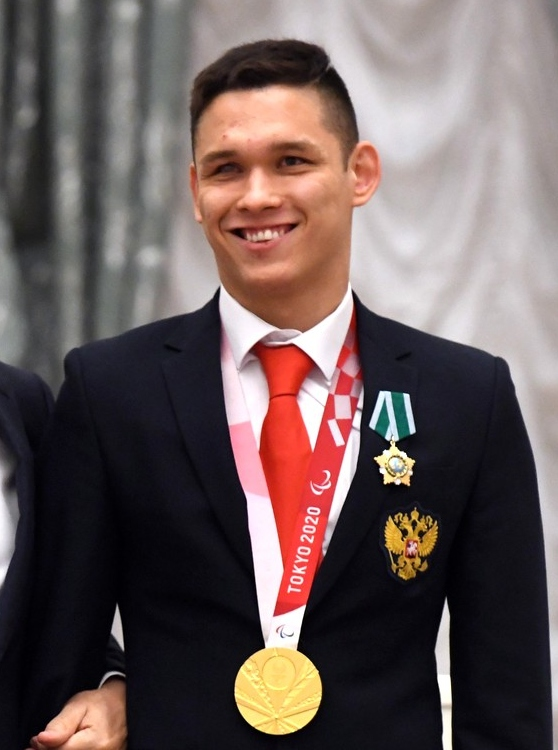

Personal information
- Nationality: Russian
- Born: 14 March 2000 (age 26)

Sport
- Sport: Paralympic swimming
- Disability class: S11
- Club: Bashkortostan Republican Adaptive Sports School of Paralympic Reserve
- Coached by: Khalil Shammasov
Medal record
Representing RPC
Paralympic Games
Gold medal – first place	2020 Tokyo	mixed 4×100 m freestyle relay

Ilnur Garipov (born 14 March 2000) is a Russian Paralympic swimmer. He represented Russian Paralympic Committee athletes at the 2020 Summer Paralympics.

== Paralympics ==
Garipov represented Russian Paralympic Committee athletes at the 2020 Summer Paralympics and won a gold medal in the mixed 4 × 100 metre freestyle relay 49pts event.
