= Laura Carolina González Rodríguez =

Colombian Paralympic swimmer

Laura González
Personal information
- Full name: Laura Carolina González Rodríguez
- Nationality: Colombian
- Born: 10 June 1999 (age 27) Villavicencio, Meta, Colombia

Sport
- Sport: Para swimming
- Disability class: S8, SM8
Medal record
Representing Colombia
Women's para swimming
Event	1st	2nd	3rd
Paralympic Games	0	0	1
World Championships	1	0	1
Parapan American Games	1	1	4
South American Para Games	0	1	1
Total	2	2	7
Paralympic Games
Bronze medal – third place	2020 Tokyo	100 m butterfly S8
World Championships
Gold medal – first place	2022 Madeira	100 m butterfly S8
Bronze medal – third place	2022 Madeira	200 m medley SM8
Parapan American Games
Gold medal – first place	2019 Lima	200 m medley SM8
Silver medal – second place	2019 Lima	100 m butterfly S8
Bronze medal – third place	2019 Lima	100 m freestyle S8
Bronze medal – third place	2023 Santiago	100 m backstroke S8
Bronze medal – third place	2023 Santiago	100 m butterfly S8
Bronze medal – third place	2023 Santiago	200 m medley SM8

Laura Carolina González Rodríguez (born 10 June 1999) is a Colombian Paralympic swimmer who competes in the S8 and SM8 category events. She is a three-time Parapan American Games medalist and a Paralympic medalist.

== Early life ==
González was born on 10 June 1999 in Villavicencio, Meta, the daughter of Eduardo González Valverde. She has a brother named Eduardo González Rodríguez. She began swimming at six years of age.

== Career ==
González won three gold medals for swimming when she competed in the national competitions in Bogotá in 2019. She competed in the 2019 Parapan American Games, winning gold, silver and bronze in the 200m individual medley, 100m butterfly and 100m freestyle respectively.

González represented Colombia at the 2020 Summer Paralympics in the women's 200 metre individual medley and women's 100 metre butterfly S8 events and won a bronze medal in the latter. As a result, she is the first Colombian woman to win a Paralympic medal in swimming.
