= Brenden Hall =

Australian Paralympic swimmer (born 1993)

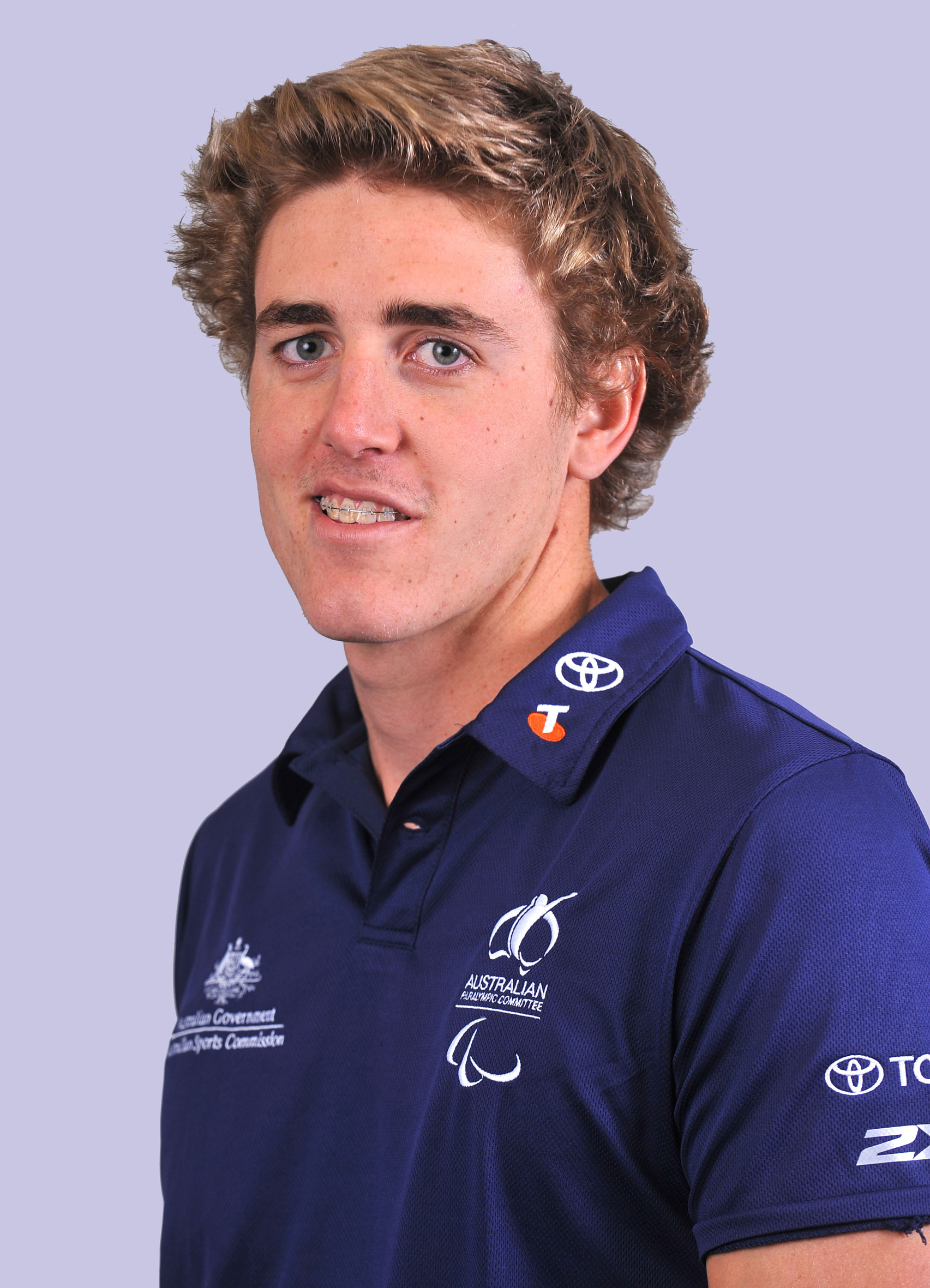
- 2012 Australian Paralympic team portrait of Hall

Personal information
- Full name: Brenden Hall
- Nickname: Junior
- Nationality: Australian
- Born: 27 May 1993 (age 33) Nambour, Queensland

Sport
- Sport: Swimming
- Strokes: Freestyle
- Classifications: S9, SB8, SM9
- Club: USC Spartans
- Coach: Casey Atkins
Medal record
Men's paralympic swimming
Representing Australia
Paralympic Games
Gold medal – first place	2012 London	400 m freestyle S9
Gold medal – first place	2012 London	4×100 m freestyle
Gold medal – first place	2016 Rio de Janeiro	400 m freestyle S9
Silver medal – second place	2016 Rio de Janeiro	100 m freestyle S9
Bronze medal – third place	2012 London	4×100 m medley
Bronze medal – third place	2016 Rio de Janeiro	100 m backstroke S9
Bronze medal – third place	2024 Paris	400 m freestyle S9
World Championships (LC)
Gold medal – first place	2010 Eindhoven	400 m freestyle S9
Gold medal – first place	2010 Eindhoven	5 km open water S1-10
Gold medal – first place	2010 Eindhoven	4×100 m freestyle 34pts
Gold medal – first place	2010 Eindhoven	4×100 m medley 34pts
Gold medal – first place	2013 Montreal	400 m freestyle S9
Gold medal – first place	2013 Montreal	4×100 m freestyle
Gold medal – first place	2015 Glasgow	100 m backstroke S9
Gold medal – first place	2015 Glasgow	400 m freestyle S9
Silver medal – second place	2019 London	400 m freestyle S9
Bronze medal – third place	2015 Glasgow	100 m freestyle S9
Bronze medal – third place	2015 Glasgow	4×100 m freestyle 34 points
Bronze medal – third place	2022 Madeira	400 m freestyle S9
Bronze medal – third place	2023 Manchester	400 m freestyle S9
Bronze medal – third place	2025 Singapore	400 m freestyle S9
Commonwealth Games
Gold medal – first place	2018 Gold Coast	100 m backstroke S9
Bronze medal – third place	2014 Glasgow	100 m freestyle S9
Bronze medal – third place	2018 Gold Coast	100 m freestyle S9

Brenden Hall, OAM (born 27 May 1993) is an Australian Paralympic swimmer. He competed at the, 2008 Beijing Paralympics, 2012 London Paralympics, 2016 Rio Paralympics, 2020 Tokyo Paralympics and the 2024 Paris Paralympics. At the end of the Paris Paralympics, he had won three gold, one silver and three bronze medals.

== Personal ==
Hall was born on 27 May 1993 in the Queensland town of Nambour. At the age of six, he had his right leg amputated after complications from chicken pox. The disease also resulted in the loss of 70% of his hearing. Initially he was reliant on a wheelchair but in the mid-2000s he was fitted with a prosthetic leg. Hall said "didn't really care how I walked, just that I could walk". Hall attended Petrie State School. In 2017, he completed a Bachelor of Exercise and Sports Science at the University of Queensland. He is completing a Bachelor of Physiotherapy at the Australian Catholic University. He is an ambassador for the Aspiration for Kids programme. and Sporting Wheelies and Disabled Association's Game Changers. He lives on the Sunshine Coast with his partner Brittany Daniec and son Bodhi.

== Career ==
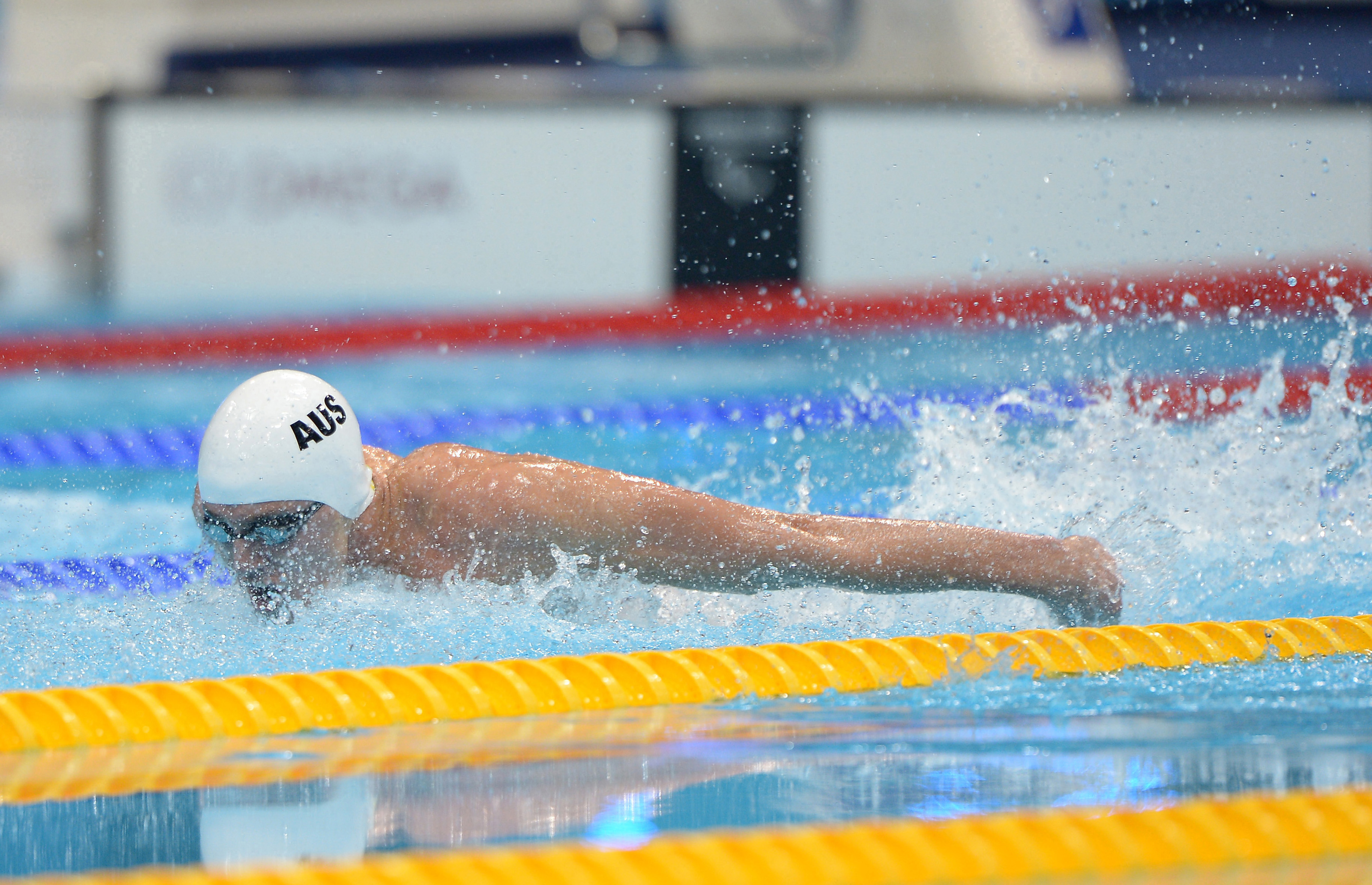
Hall at the 2012 London Paralympics

Before his amputation, he was a member of a mini development squad and returned to swimming after his amputation had healed. He made his international swimming debut at the 2007 Arafura Games. He was the youngest male on the Australian swimming team at the 2008 Beijing Games. He competed in the Men's 400 m Freestyle S9 and came 5th in the final. He broke the Paralympic record in his heat. At the 2010 IPC Swimming World Championships in Eindhoven he won gold medals in the Men's 400m Freestyle S9, Men's 5 km Open Water S1-S10, Men's 4 x 100 m Freestyle Relay 34 points (Heat) Men's 4 x 100 m Medley Relay 34 points (Heat). In 2011, at the Queensland Swimming Championships he broke world records in the 800 m and 1500 m Freestyle events.

At the 2012 London Games, Hall won two gold medals in the Men's 400 m Freestyle S9 and Men's 4 x 100 m Freestyle Relay 34 points and a bronze medal in the Men's 4 x 100 m Medley Relay 34 points. He also participated in the S9 class of the Men's 100 m Backstroke, 100 m Butterfly S9, 100 m Freestyle and 50 m Freestyle events – as well as the 200 m Individual Medley SM9.

As of February 2013, Hall holds S9 world records in the 400 m, 800 m and 1500 m freestyle events. Competing at the 2013 IPC Swimming World Championships in Montreal, Quebec, Canada, he won two gold medals in the Men's 400m Freestyle S9 and Men's 4 × 100 m Freestyle Relay (34 points). He broke the world record in winning the Men's 400m Freestyle S9.

At the 2015 IPC Swimming World Championships, Hall won the gold medals in the Men's 100 m Backstroke S9 and Men's 400 m Freestyle S9 and bronze medals in the Men's 100 m Freestyle S9 and Men's 4 × 100 m Freestyle Relay 34 points. He finished fifth in the Men's 50m Freestyle S9, fifth in the Men's 100m Butterfly S9 and sixth in the Men's 200m Individual Medley SM9.

At the 2016 Rio Paralympics, Hall won the gold medal in the Men's 400 m Freestyle S9, silver medal in the Men's 100 m Freestyle S9 and bronze medal in the Men's 100 m Backstroke S9. He also competed in the following events: Men's 100m Butterfly S9 finishing fourth, Men's 4 × 100 m Medley Relay (34 points) placing fourth, Men's 200m Individual Medley SM9 where he was disqualified and Men's 50m Freestyle S9 not progressing to the finals.

In preparation for Rio, Hall stated: "The fire's there. I love being in the water. I'm just aiming to have a good Games and defend the 400m. My training is based around the 400m. That's the one I want to do best in." After winning the gold medal at Rio, Hall says: "We're very excited, very relieved, I think the party's only begun tonight, but still got about five events to go, so hopefully we'll figure again."

At the 2019 World Para Swimming Championships in London, Hall won the silver medal in the Men's 400 m Freestyle S9.

At the 2020 Tokyo Paralympics, Hall competed in three events but did not medal. He reached the final of the 400 m freestyle S9 and come fourth. He also reached the final of the 100 m backstroke S9 and came eighth. He did not advance to the final of the 100 m butterfly S9.

Hall won the bronze medal in the Men's 400 m Freestyle at the 2022 World Para Swimming Championships, Madeira.

At the 2022 Birmingham Commonwealth Games, he finished 5th in the Men's 100m Backstroke S9. Hall won the bronze medal in the Men's 400 m Freestyle at the 2023 World Para Swimming Championships, Manchester, England.

At the 2024 Summer Paralympics in Paris, France - his fifth Summer Paralympics, he won the bronze medal in the Men's 400 m freestyle S9. He swam in the Men's 100 m and 100 m backstroke S9 events but did not qualify for the final. At the 2025 World Para Swimming Championships in Singapore, he won the bronze medal in the Men's 400 m freestyle S9.

In 2024, he is coached by Casey Atkins at USC Spartans at the University of the Sunshine Coast.

== Recognition ==
Hall was awarded a Medal of the Order of Australia in the 2014 Australia Day Honours "for service to sport as a Gold Medallist at the London 2012 Paralympic Games." In 2015, he won the Queensland Athlete with a Disability Award, the third time he had won this award. At the 2024 Paris Paralympics Opening Ceremony, he was the flag bearer with Madison de Rozario.

== See also ==
- Australia at the Paralympics
- Australian Paralympic Swim Team
