= Matilde Alcázar =

Mexican Paralympic swimmer

Personal information
- Full name: Matilde Estefanía Alcázar Figueroa
- Nicknames: Maty, Mermaid of Mexico City
- Born: 3 September 1995 (age 30) Mexico City, Mexico

Sport
- Country: Mexico
- Sport: Paralympic swimming
- Disability: Cone dystrophy Strabismus
- Disability class: S12
Medal record
Paralympic swimming
Representing Mexico
Parapan American Games
Gold medal – first place	2019 Lima	100m freestyle S11
Gold medal – first place	2019 Lima	400m freestyle S11
Gold medal – first place	2019 Lima	100m backstroke S11
Silver medal – second place	2019 Lima	100m breaststroke SB11
Bronze medal – third place	2019 Lima	50m freestyle S11
World Championships
Gold medal – first place	2017 Mexico City	100m freestyle S11
Silver medal – second place	2017 Mexico City	100m breaststroke SB11
Bronze medal – third place	2017 Mexico City	100m backstroke S11
Bronze medal – third place	2022 Madeira	400m freestyle S11

Matilde Estefanía Alcázar Figueroa (born 3 September 1995) is a Mexican Paralympic swimmer who competes in international swimming competitions. She is a triple Parapan American Games champion and a World champion, she has also competed at the 2012 and 2020 Summer Paralympics.

In 2018, Alcázar broke the world record in the women's 100m backstroke S11 which had been held for 34 years. She broke the record at a World Para Swimming World Series in São Paulo.
