= Marcos Zárate =

Mexican Paralympic swimmer

Personal information
- Full name: Marcos Rafael Zárate Rodríguez
- Born: 5 November 1999 (age 26) Jalisco, Mexico

Sport
- Sport: Paralympic swimming
Medal record
Representing Mexico
World Championships
Silver medal – second place	2023 Manchester	150m individual medley SM3
Parapan American Games
Silver medal – second place	2019 Lima	50m freestyle S3
Silver medal – second place	2019 Lima	100m freestyle S3
Silver medal – second place	2019 Lima	200m freestyle S3
Silver medal – second place	2019 Lima	50m backstroke S3
Silver medal – second place	2019 Lima	50m butterfly S4
Silver medal – second place	2023 Santiago	50m freestyle S3
Silver medal – second place	2023 Santiago	200m freestyle S3
Silver medal – second place	2023 Santiago	50m backstroke S3
Bronze medal – third place	2019 Lima	50m breaststroke SB2
Bronze medal – third place	2019 Lima	150m individual medley SM3
Bronze medal – third place	2023 Santiago	50m breaststroke SB2

Marcos Rafael Zárate Rodríguez (born 5 November 1999) is a Mexican Paralympic swimmer who competes in international swimming competitions. He is a multiple Parapan American Games medalist and a World silver medalist, he is selected to compete at the 2024 Summer Paralympics.

Zárate won the Jalisco 2020 State Youth Award after he won medals at the 2019 Parapan American Games as well as breaking two continental records.
