= Guilherme Batista Silva =

Brazilian para swimmer

Personal information
- Nationality: Brazilian

Sport
- Sport: Para swimming
- Disability class: S13, SB13
Medal record
Men's para swimming
Representing Brazil
World Championships
Gold medal – first place	2022 Madeira	Mixed 4×100 m medley relay 49pts
Gold medal – first place	2025 Singapore	Mixed 4×100 m medley relay 49pts
Silver medal – second place	2019 London	Mixed 4×100 m freestyle relay 49pts
Bronze medal – third place	2023 Manchester	Mixed 4×100 m medley relay 49pts
Parapan American Games
Gold medal – first place	2015 Toronto	100 m breaststroke SB13
Bronze medal – third place	2015 Toronto	50 m freestyle S13
Bronze medal – third place	2015 Toronto	100 m freestyle S13
Bronze medal – third place	2015 Toronto	200 m ind. medley SM13
Bronze medal – third place	2019 Lima	50 m freestyle S13
Bronze medal – third place	2019 Lima	400 m freestyle S13
Bronze medal – third place	2019 Lima	200 m ind. medley SM13

Guilherme Batista Silva is a Brazilian para swimmer. He represented Brazil at the 2016 Summer Paralympics.

== Career ==
Batista represented Brazil at the 2016 Summer Paralympics. He competed at the 2019 Parapan American Games and won bronze medals in the 50 metre freestyle, 400 metre freestyle, and 200 metre individual medley events.

He competed at the 2025 World Para Swimming Championships and won a gold medal in the mixed 4 × 100 metre medley relay 49 pts with a world record time of 4:23.48.
