= Jamal Hill (swimmer) =

American Paralympic swimmer (born 1995)

Personal information
- Nationality: American
- Born: February 24, 1995 (age 31) Los Angeles, California, U.S.

Sport
- Sport: Paralympic swimming
- Disability: Charcot–Marie–Tooth disease
- Disability class: S10, SM10
Medal record
Men's paralympic swimming
Representing United States
Paralympic Games
Bronze medal – third place	2020 Tokyo	50 m freestyle S9
World Championships
Silver medal – second place	2022 Madeira	50 m freestyle S9
Parapan American Games
Bronze medal – third place	2019 Lima	50 m freestyle S10

Jamal Hill (born February 24, 1995) is an American Paralympic swimmer. He represented the United States at the 2020 Summer Paralympics.

== Career ==
Hill competed in the men's 50 metre freestyle S9 event at the 2020 Summer Paralympics and won a bronze medal.

On April 14, 2022, Hill was named to the roster to represent the United States at the 2022 World Para Swimming Championships. On April 29, 2023, Hill was named to the roster to represent the United States at the 2023 World Para Swimming Championships.
