= Cecília Jerônimo de Araújo =

Brazilian Paralympic swimmer (born 1998)

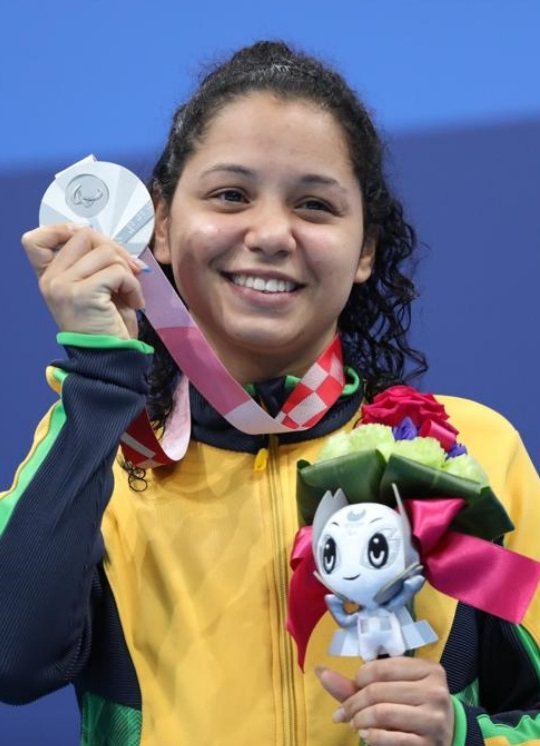

Personal information
- Full name: Cecília Kethlen Jerônimo de Araújo
- Born: 13 October 1998 (age 27) Natal, Rio Grande do Norte, Brazil

Sport
- Sport: Paralympic swimming
- Disability: Cerebral palsy
- Disability class: S8
- Club: Associacao Paralimpica de Indaiatuba
- Coached by: Antonio Luiz Duarte Candido
Medal record
Women's para swimming
Representing Brazil
Paralympic Games
Silver medal – second place	2020 Tokyo	50 m freestyle S8
Silver medal – second place	2024 Paris	50 m freestyle S8
World Championships
Gold medal – first place	2017 Mexico City	50 m freestyle S8
Gold medal – first place	2022 Madeira	50 m freestyle S8
Gold medal – first place	2023 Manchester	50 m freestyle S8
Silver medal – second place	2017 Mexico City	100 m freestyle S8
Silver medal – second place	2019 London	50 m freestyle S8
Bronze medal – third place	2022 Madeira	100 m freestyle S8
Parapan American Games
Gold medal – first place	2019 Lima	50 m freestyle S8
Gold medal – first place	2019 Lima	100 m freestyle S8
Gold medal – first place	2019 Lima	400 m freestyle S8
Gold medal – first place	2019 Lima	100 m butterfly S8
Gold medal – first place	2023 Santiago	50 m freestyle S8
Gold medal – first place	2023 Santiago	400 m freestyle S8
Gold medal – first place	2023 Santiago	4x100 m freestyle relay 34pts
Gold medal – first place	2023 Santiago	4x100 m medley relay 34pts
Gold medal – first place	2023 Santiago	4x100 m medley relay 49pts
Silver medal – second place	2019 Lima	4x100 m medley relay
Silver medal – second place	2023 Santiago	100 m backstroke S8
Silver medal – second place	2023 Santiago	100 m butterfly S8
Silver medal – second place	2023 Santiago	200 m medley SM8
Bronze medal – third place	2019 Lima	100 m backstroke S8
Bronze medal – third place	2019 Lima	4x100 m freestyle relay
Bronze medal – third place	2023 Santiago	100 m freestyle S9

Cecília Kethlen Jerônimo de Araújo (born 13 October 1998) is a Brazilian Paralympic swimmer. She represents Brazil in elite international competitions. She represented Brazil at the 2016 and 2020 Summer Paralympics.

== Career ==
Jerônimo de Araújo made her international debut for Brazil at the 2015 Parapan American Games. She won seven medals at the 2019 Parapan American Games, including four gold medals.

She won a gold medal at the 2017 World Para Swimming Championships in the 50 metre freestyle S8 event and a silver medal in the 100 metre freestyle S8 event. She won a silver medal at the 2019 World Para Swimming Championships in the 50 metre freestyle S8 event.

She represented Brazil at the 2016 Summer Paralympics. She again represented Brazil at the 2020 Summer Paralympics in the 50 metre freestyle S8 event and won a silver medal.
