= Natalie Sims (swimmer) =

American Paralympic swimmer (born 1997)

Personal information
- Born: 6 June 1997 (age 29) Edina, Minnesota, U.S.
- Height: 1.73 m (5 ft 8 in)
- Weight: 145 lb (66 kg)

Sport
- Country: United States
- Sport: Paralympic swimming
- Disability: Amelia
- Disability class: S9, SB9, SM9
- Club: University of Wisconsin-La Crosse
- Coached by: Richard Pein
Medal record
Paralympic swimming
Representing United States
Paralympic Games
Bronze medal – third place	2024 Paris	Mixed 4×100 m freestyle relay 34pts
World Championships
Gold medal – first place	2017 Mexico City	Women's 4x100m freestyle relay
Gold medal – first place	2017 Mexico City	Women's 4x100m medley relay
Bronze medal – third place	2017 Mexico City	Women's 50m freestyle S9
Bronze medal – third place	2017 Mexico City	Women's 100m freestyle S9
Bronze medal – third place	2017 Mexico City	Women's 400m freestyle S9
Parapan American Games
Gold medal – first place	2019 Lima	Women's 100m freestyle S9
Silver medal – second place	2019 Lima	Women's 4x100m freestyle relay
Bronze medal – third place	2019 Lima	Women's 100m butterfly S9
Bronze medal – third place	2019 Lima	Women's 200m individual medley SM9

Natalie Sims (born 6 June 1997) is an American Paralympic swimmer who competes in international level events. She was born without her right hand.

== Personal life ==
She is the cousin of Dragomir Cioroslan who is a bronze medalist at the 1984 Summer Olympics in Los Angeles.
