= Douglas Matera =

Brazilian Paralympic swimmer

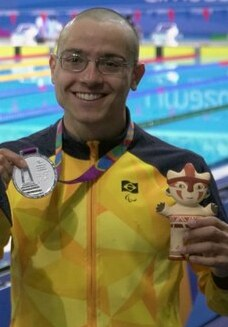

Personal information
- Born: 8 May 1993 (age 33) Rio de Janeiro, Brazil

Sport
- Sport: Para swimming
- Disability: Retinitis pigmentosa
- Disability class: S13
- Club: Club de Regatas Vasco da Gama
Medal record
Representing Brazil
Paralympic Games
| Silver medal – second place | 2020 Tokyo | mixed 4×100 m freestyle relay 49pts |
| Silver medal – second place | 2024 Paris | mixed 4×100 m freestyle relay 49pts |
World Championships
| Gold medal – first place | 2023 Manchester | 100 m butterfly S12 |
| Silver medal – second place | 2025 Singapore | Mixed 4×100 m freestyle relay 49pts |
| Bronze medal – third place | 2023 Manchester | 100 m backstroke S12 |
Parapan American Games
| Gold medal – first place | 2019 Lima | 100 m backstroke S13 |
| Gold medal – first place | 2019 Lima | 100 m butterfly S13 |
| Gold medal – first place | 2019 Lima | 400 m freestyle S13 |
| Silver medal – second place | 2019 Lima | 50 m freestyle S13 |
| Silver medal – second place | 2019 Lima | 100 m freestyle S13 |
| Silver medal – second place | 2019 Lima | 200 m ind. medley SM13 |

Douglas Matera (born 8 May 1993) is a Brazilian Paralympic swimmer. He represented Brazil at the 2020 Summer Paralympics.

== Career ==
Matera represented Brazil at the 2019 Parapan American Games where he won three gold medals and three silver medals.

Matera represented Brazil at the 2020 Summer Paralympics and won a silver medal in the mixed 4 × 100 metre freestyle relay 49pts event.

== Personal life ==
Matera was diagnosed with retinitis pigmentosa. His older brother, Thomaz, represented Brazil at the 2016 Summer Paralympics.
