= Haven Shepherd =

Vietnamese-American Paralympic swimmer

Personal information
- Born: Do Thi Thuy Phuong; March 10, 2003 (age 23) Quảng Nam province, Vietnam

Sport
- Sport: Swimming
- Classifications: S8
Medal record
Representing United States
Parapan American Games
Gold medal – first place	2023 Santiago	200m individual medley SM8

Haven Shepherd (born March 10, 2003) is a Vietnamese-American Paralympic swimmer. In 2018, she was included on the BBC 100 Women list.

== Early life ==
Shepherd was born Do Thi Thuy Phuong in Quang Nam province, Vietnam after her parents had an affair. When she was 14 months old, her parents died in a bomb explosion, either as a double suicide or as a murder-suicide perpetrated by her father. Although Shepherd was also intended to die in the explosion, she was instead blown 40 feet away and only sustained damage to her legs. An older half-sister also survived the explosion. Shepherd was brought by her grandmother to a hospital in Da Nang, where both her legs were amputated. At age 20 months, she was adopted by an American couple from Carthage, Missouri, who had six older children.

Shepherd learned to swim by age 3. She was homeschooled.

== Athletic career ==
Shepherd began swimming competitively at age 10. By the time she was 13, the US Paralympic team began tracking her as a potential candidate based on her times.

She came in second in her event at the 2019 Parapan American Games in Lima, Peru.

At the 2020 Summer Paralympics, Shepherd came fifth in the Women's 200m Individual Medley SM8.

Shepherd won a gold medal at the 2023 Parapan American Games in the women's 200m individual medley SM8. Prior to her win, she came fourth in the backstroke, butterfly, and breaststroke 100m events, and seventh in the 50m freestyle.

In April 2024, Shepherd participated in an ad campaign for Reese's. Shepherd competed at the 2024 Summer Paralympics in Paris.

== Personal life ==
Shepherd uses prosthetic legs.
