= Wendell Belarmino Pereira =

Brazilian Paralympic swimmer

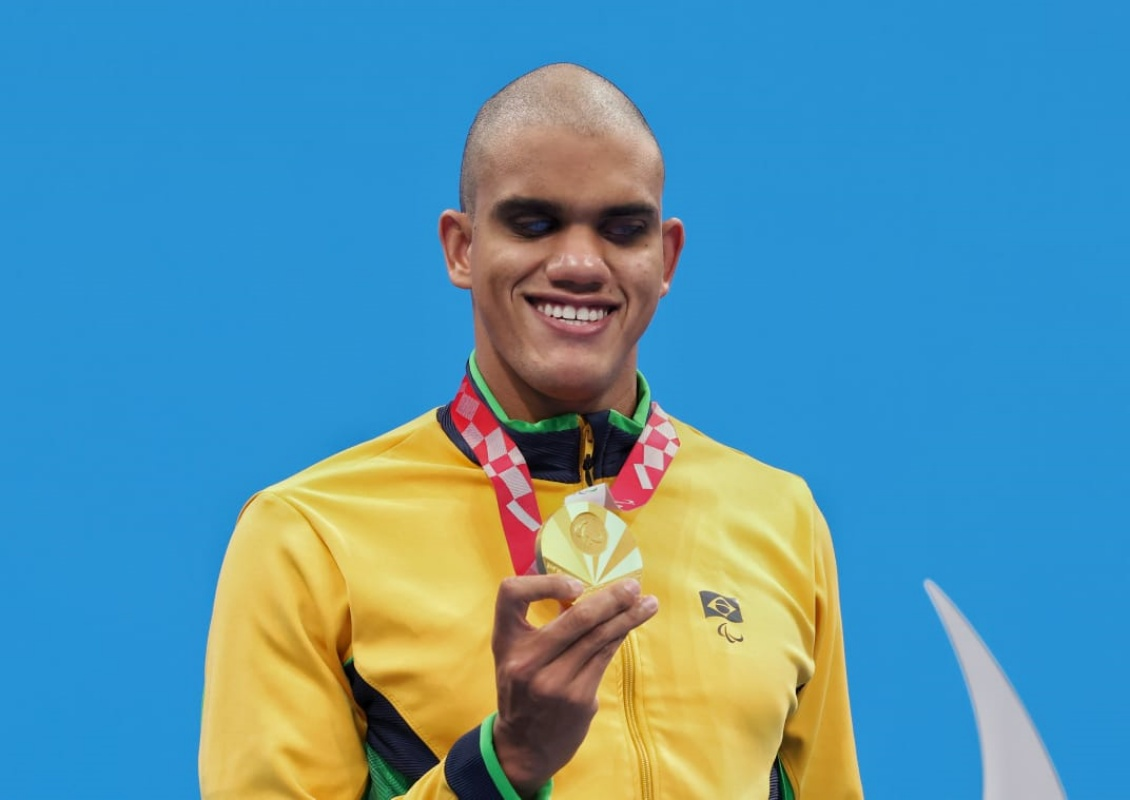

Personal information
- Nationality: Brazilian
- Born: 20 May 1998 (age 28)

Sport
- Sport: Paralympic swimming
- Disability class: S11
Medal record
Paralympic swimming
Representing Brazil
Paralympic Games
Gold medal – first place	2020 Tokyo	50 m freestyle S11
Silver medal – second place	2020 Tokyo	mixed 4×100 m freestyle relay 49pts
Silver medal – second place	2024 Paris	50m freestyle S11
Bronze medal – third place	2020 Tokyo	100 m butterfly S11
Parapan American Games
Gold medal – first place	2023 Santiago	100 m backstroke S11
Gold medal – first place	2023 Santiago	100 m butterfly S11
Gold medal – first place	2023 Santiago	200 m medley SM11
Gold medal – first place	2023 Santiago	50 m freestyle S11
Gold medal – first place	2023 Santiago	mixed 4×100 m medley relay 34pts
Gold medal – first place	2023 Santiago	mixed 4×100 m medley relay 49pts
Silver medal – second place	2023 Santiago	400 m freestyle S11

Wendell Belarmino Pereira (born 20 May 1998) is a Brazilian Paralympic swimmer. He won gold in the 50 metre freestyle S11 in 2020.
