= Genki Saito =

Japanese Paralympic swimmer (born 1998)

Personal information
- Born: 21 October 1998 (age 28) Yokohama, Japan

Sport
- Sport: Paralympic swimming
- Disability class: S13, SB13
Medal record
Men's Paralympic swimming
Representing Japan
World Championships
Bronze medal – third place	2022 Madeira	400 m freestyle S13
Bronze medal – third place	2022 Madeira	Mixed 4×100 m medley relay 49pts
Bronze medal – third place	2025 Singapore	Mixed 4×100 m medley relay 49pts
Bronze medal – third place	2025 Singapore	Mixed 4×100 m freestyle relay 49pts
Asian Para Games
Gold medal – first place	2026 Aichi–Nagoya	100 m breaststroke SB13
Silver medal – second place	2022 Hangzhou	400 m freestyle S13
Silver medal – second place	2022 Hangzhou	200 m ind. medley SM13
Silver medal – second place	2026 Aichi–Nagoya	100 m backstroke S12
Bronze medal – third place	2022 Hangzhou	100 m backstroke S13
Bronze medal – third place	2026 Aichi–Nagoya	100 m freestyle S12

Genki Saito (齋藤 元希, Saito Genki; born 21 October 1998) is a Japanese Paralympic swimmer. He represented Japan at the 2020 and 2024 Summer Paralympics.

== Career ==
Saito represented Japan at the 2020 and 2024 Summer Paralympics. He competed at the 2022 Asian Para Games and won silver medals in the 400 metre freestyle and 200 metre individual medley and a bronze medal in the 100 metre backstroke S13 events. He competed at the 2025 World Para Swimming Championships and won bronze medals in the mixed 4 × 100 metre medley relay 49 pts and mixed 4 × 100 metre freestyle relay 49pts events.
