= Facundo Arregui =

Argentine Paralympic swimmer (born 1997)

Personal information
- Born: 15 September 1997 (age 28) Rosario, Santa Fe, Argentina

Sport
- Country: Argentina
- Sport: Paralympic swimming
- Disability: Spina bifida
- Disability class: S7
Medal record
Paralympic swimming
Representing Argentina
Parapan American Games
Gold medal – first place	2015 Toronto	400m freestyle S7
Silver medal – second place	2019 Lima	4x100m freestyle relay 34pts
Bronze medal – third place	2015 Toronto	4x100m freestyle relay
Bronze medal – third place	2019 Lima	400m freestyle S7
World Championships
Silver medal – second place	2017 Mexico City	400m freestyle S7

Facundo José Arregui (born 15 September 1997) is an Argentine Paralympic swimmer who competes at international swimming competitions. He specialises in freestyle swimming and open water swimming. He is a Parapan American Games champion and a World silver medalist in freestyle swimming. He also competed at the Argentina at the 2016 Summer Paralympics where he finished fifth place in the 400 m freestyle S7 event.

== Family ==
Arregui's father is Fernando Arregui is a water polo player, he competed in the water polo at the 2011 Pan American Games and is also Facundo's swimming coach. Facundo's sister Camilla Arregui is a synchronized swimmer who has competed at the 2017 and 2019 World Aquatics Championships.
