= Chile at the 2023 Parapan American Games =

- Flag of Chile
- IPC code: CHI
- NPC: Chilean Paralympic Committee
- Website: paralimpico.cl

in Santiago, Chile 17 November 2023 – 26 November 2023
- Competitors: 168 (110 men and 58 women) in 17 sports
- Flag bearers (opening): Vicente Almonacid; Tamara Leonelli
- Flag bearer (closing): Ignacio Torres
- Officials: 40
- Medals Ranked 6th: Gold 16 Silver 20 Bronze 15 Total 51

Parapan American Games appearances
- 1999; 2003; 2007; 2011; 2015; 2019; 2023

Chile competed at the 2023 Parapan American Games in Santiago, Chile from 17 November to 26 November 2023. Chile was the host nation of the games, marking the first time the country hosts the games. This was Chile's seventh appearance at the Parapan American Games, having competed at every edition of the games since the inaugural edition in 1999.

Paralympic swimmer Vicente Almonacid and para table tennis athlete Tamara Leonelli were the country's flagbearers during the opening ceremony. Meanwhile, para table tennis athlete Ignacio Torres was the country's flagbearer during the closing ceremony.

== Medalists ==
The following Chilean competitors won medals at the games. In the discipline sections below, the medalists' names are bolded.

Medal	Name	Sport	Event	Date
Gold	Luis Flores	Table tennis	Men's singles C2	November 18
Gold	Maximiliano Rodríguez	Table tennis	Men's singles C4	November 18
Gold	Florencia Pérez	Table tennis	Women's singles C8	November 18
Gold	Tamara Leonelli	Table tennis	Women's singles C4-5	November 18
Gold	Juan Carlos Garrido	Powerlifting	Men's 72 kg	November 18
Gold	Camila Campos	Powerlifting	Women's 50 & 55 kg	November 20
Gold	Florencia Pérez; Ignacio Torres	Table tennis	Mixed doubles C14-17	November 20
Gold	Maximiliano Rodríguez; Cristián González	Table tennis	Men's doubles C8	November 20
Gold	Jorge Carinao	Powerlifting	Men's 65 kg	November 20
Gold	Ignacio Torres; Matías Pino	Table tennis	Men's doubles C14	November 20
Gold	Camila Campos; Jorge Carinao; Juan Carlos Garrido	Powerlifting	Mixed team	November 21
Gold	Mauricio Orrego	Athletics	Men's 1500 metres T46	November 22
Gold	Vicente Almonacid	Swimming	Men's 200 metre individual medley SM8	November 23
Gold	Francisco Cayulef	Wheelchair tennis	Quad singles	November 24
Gold	Francisco Cayulef; Diego Pérez	Wheelchair tennis	Quad doubles	November 25
Gold	Jaime Aránguiz	Badminton	Men's singles WH2	November 26
Silver	Cristián González	Table tennis	Men's singles C4	November 18
Silver	Ignacio Torres	Table tennis	Men's singles C6	November 18
Silver	Manuel Echaveguren	Table tennis	Men's singles C10	November 18
Silver	Javier Jiménez	Powerlifting	Men's 59 kg	November 18
Silver	Alberto Abarza	Swimming	Men's 100 metre backstroke S2	November 20
Silver	Marion Serrano	Powerlifting	Women's 86 & +86 kg	November 20
Silver	Luis Flores; Vicente Leiva	Table tennis	Men's doubles C4	November 20
Silver	Ailyn Espinoza; Joseline Yevenes	Table tennis	Women's doubles C14-20	November 20
Silver	Claudio Bahamondes; Manuel Echaveguren	Table tennis	Men's doubles C18	November 20
Silver	Ailyn Espinoza; Manuel Echaveguren	Table tennis	Mixed doubles C20	November 20
Silver	Tamara Leonelli; Maximiliano Rodríguez	Table tennis	Mixed doubles C10	November 20
Silver	Alberto Abarza	Swimming	Men's 200 metre freestyle S2	November 21
Silver	Mariela López	Archery	Women's individual W1	November 22
Silver	Mariana Zúñiga	Archery	Women's individual compound open	November 22
Silver	Alberto Abarza	Swimming	Men's 50 metre freestyle S2	November 22
Silver	Alberto Abarza	Swimming	Men's 50 metre backstroke S2	November 23
Silver	Nicolás Castro	Athletics	Men's shot put F63	November 23
Silver	Alberto Abarza	Swimming	Men's 100 metre freestyle S2	November 24
Silver	Vicente Almonacid	Swimming	Men's 100 metre breaststroke SB8	November 24
Silver	Alexander Cataldo	Wheelchair tennis	Men's singles	November 25
Bronze	Armin Rosas	Table tennis	Men's singles C11	November 18
Bronze	Matías Pino	Table tennis	Men's singles C6	November 18
Bronze	Cristián Dettoni	Table tennis	Men's singles C6	November 18
Bronze	Vicente Leiva	Table tennis	Men's singles C1	November 18
Bronze	Matías Mansilla; Guide: Marcelo Mansilla	Cycling	Men's road time trial B	November 19
Bronze	Jonathan Astudillo	Powerlifting	Men's 80 kg	November 20
Bronze	Kiara Godoy	Swimming	Women's 100 metre butterfly S9	November 20
Bronze	Víctor Saiz	Archery	Men's individual W1	November 22
Bronze	Patricio Larenas	Swimming	Men's 50 metre freestyle S3	November 22
Bronze	Patricio Larenas	Swimming	Men's 200 metre freestyle S3	November 23
Bronze	Constanza Fuentes	Taekwondo	Women's 65 kg	November 24
Bronze	Alexander Cataldo; Brayan Tapia	Wheelchair tennis	Men's doubles	November 24
Bronze	Amanda Cerna	Athletics	Women's 400 metres T47	November 24
Bronze	Macarena Cabrillana	Wheelchair tennis	Women's singles	November 24
Bronze	Matías Mansilla; Guide: Marcelo Mansilla	Cycling	Men's road race B	November 26

Medals by sport
Sport	1st place, gold medalist(s)	2nd place, silver medalist(s)	3rd place, bronze medalist(s)	Total
Table tennis	7	8	4	**19**
Powerlifting	4	2	1	**7**
Wheelchair tennis	2	1	2	**5**
Swimming	1	6	3	**10**
Athletics	1	1	1	**3**
Badminton	1	0	0	**1**
Archery	0	2	1	**3**
Cycling	0	0	2	**2**
Taekwondo	0	0	1	**1**
Total	16	20	15	51

Medals by day
Day	Date	1st place, gold medalist(s)	2nd place, silver medalist(s)	3rd place, bronze medalist(s)	Total
1	November 18	5	4	4	**13**
2	November 19	0	0	1	**1**
3	November 20	5	7	2	**14**
4	November 21	1	1	0	**2**
5	November 22	1	3	2	**6**
6	November 23	1	2	1	**4**
7	November 24	1	2	4	**7**
8	November 25	1	1	0	**2**
9	November 26	1	0	1	**2**
Total		16	20	15	51

Medals by gender
**Gender**	1st place, gold medalist(s)	2nd place, silver medalist(s)	3rd place, bronze medalist(s)	**Total**
Male	9	14	11	34
Female	3	4	4	11
Mixed	4	2	0	6
Total	16	20	15	51

== Competitors ==
The following is the list of number of competitors (per gender) participating at the games per sport/discipline.

Sport	Men	Women	Total
Archery	3	3	6
Athletics	6	7	13
Badminton	3	3	6
Boccia	4	3	7
Cycling	4	2	6
Football 5-a-side	10	—N/a	10
Football 7-a-side	14	—N/a	14
Goalball	6	6	12
Judo	4	3	7
Powerlifting	8	4	12
Shooting	3	0	3
Swimming	5	6	11
Table tennis	11	5	16
Taekwondo	2	1	3
Wheelchair basketball	12	12	24
Wheelchair rugby	11	1	12
Wheelchair tennis	4	2	6
Total	110	58	168

== Archery ==
Men

Athlete	Event	Ranking Round		Round of 16	Quarterfinals	Semifinals	Final / BM	
Athlete	Event	Score	Seed	Opposition Score	Opposition Score	Opposition Score	Opposition Score	Rank
Víctor Saiz	Individual W1	571	3	—N/a		Franco (BRA); L 123–128	Bronze medal match Herro (USA); W 115–111	3rd place, bronze medalist(s)
Alfonso Díaz	Individual compound open	604	11	Castro (BRA); L 125–135	Did not advance			
Cristián Aguirre	Individual recurve open	524	7	Capó (CUB); W 6–0	Bennett (USA); L 2–6	Did not advance		

Women

Athlete	Event	Ranking Round		Round of 16	Quarterfinals	Semifinals	Final / BM	
Athlete	Event	Score	Seed	Opposition Score	Opposition Score	Opposition Score	Opposition Score	Rank
Mariela López	Individual W1	427	2	—N/a		Torres (ARG); W 79–49	Otto (USA); L 83–101	2nd place, silver medalist(s)
Carla Candia	Individual compound open	601	10	Moraes (BRA); W 119–118	Riveros (CRC); L 116–139	Did not advance		
Mariana Zúñiga	Individual compound open	677 PR	1	Bye	Wallace (USA); W 141–127	Gardner (USA); W 141–137	Riveros (CRC); L 138–139	2nd place, silver medalist(s)

Mixed

Athlete	Event	Ranking Round		Quarterfinals	Semifinals	Final / BM	
Athlete	Event	Score	Seed	Opposition Score	Opposition Score	Opposition Score	Rank
Alfonso Díaz; Mariana Zúñiga	Team compound open	1281	6	Correa / Peñaranda (COL); L 143–148	Did not advance		

== Athletics ==
Key

- Note–Ranks given for track events are within the athlete's heat only
- Q = Qualified for the next round
- q = Qualified for the next round as the fastest loser

Men

Track events

Athlete	Event	Semifinal		Final	
Athlete	Event	Time	Rank	Time	Rank
David Jorquera	100 m T38	—N/a		12.49	4
David Jorquera	400 m T38	—N/a		56.63	5
Cristián Valenzuela	1500 m T11	4:41.31	3 q	4:38.48	4
Cristián Valenzuela	5000 m T11	—N/a		DNF	
Wladimir Palma	1500 m T20	—N/a		4:17.19	5
Mauricio Orrego	1500 m T46	—N/a		4:12.50	1st place, gold medalist(s)
Ignacio Sepúlveda	1500 m T46	—N/a		4:18.08	4

Field events

Athlete	Event	Final	
Athlete	Event	Distance	Position
Nicolás Castro	Shot put F63	11.93	2nd place, silver medalist(s)

Women

Track events

Athlete	Event	Semifinal		Final	
Athlete	Event	Time	Rank	Time	Rank
Nicole Baeza	100 m T12	13.75	2 q	13.94	4
Franchesca Espinoza	400 m T20	—N/a		1:04.68	7
Amanda Cerna	400 m T47	1:01.27	2 Q	1:00.59	3rd place, bronze medalist(s)
Josefa López	400 m T47	1:04.42	5 q	1:03.71	6
Margarita Faúndez	1500 m T11	—N/a		5:43.89	5

Field events

Athlete	Event	Final		
Athlete	Event	Distance	Points	Position
Josefa López	Long jump T47	4.87	—N/a	5
Francisca Mardones	Shot put F53/F54/F55	7.09	881	5
Francisca Mardones	Javelin throw F54	13.51	—N/a	4
Miriam Pérez	Discus throw F64	19.95	—N/a	6

== Badminton ==
Men

Athlete	Event	Preliminaries				Quarterfinals	Semifinals	Final / BM	
Athlete	Event	Opposition Result	Opposition Result	Opposition Result	Rank	Opposition Result	Opposition Result	Opposition Result	Rank
Jaime Aránguiz	Singles WH2	Fajardo (PER); W 21–5, 21–8	Chaves (BRA); W 21–17, 21–7	Barbosa (BRA); W 21–2, 21–3	1 Q	—N/a	Chaves (BRA); W 21–5, 21–9	Godoy (BRA); W 21–15, 21–11	1st place, gold medalist(s)
Patricio Echeverría	Singles SL3	Mercedes (DOM); L 10–21, 11–21	Puente (PER); L 4–21, 5–21	—N/a	3	Did not advance			
Pablo Coloma	Singles SH6	Krajewski (USA); L 5–21, 6–21	Mattos (ARG); L 8–21, 5–21	Lightfoot (CAN); L 5–21, 7–21	4	Did not advance			

Women

Athlete	Event	Preliminaries				Semifinals	Final / BM	
Athlete	Event	Opposition Result	Opposition Result	Opposition Result	Rank	Opposition Result	Opposition Result	Rank
Daniela Zapata	Singles WH2	Jáuregui (PER); L 0–21, 5–21	Vicente (ARG); L 16–21, 8–21	—N/a	3	Did not advance		
Makarena Arriagada	Singles SU5	Dias (BRA); L 12–21, 10–21	Ari (PER); L 7–21, 7–21	Llanes (CUB); L 12–21, 7–21	4	Did not advance		
Krishna Caimanque	Singles SU5	Rojas (PER); L 1–21, 1–21	Almeida (BRA); L 2–21, 7–21	Fernandes (BRA); L 5–21, 5–21	4	Did not advance		

Mixed

Athlete	Event	Preliminaries			Semifinals	Final / BM	
Athlete	Event	Opposition Result	Opposition Result	Rank	Opposition Result	Opposition Result	Rank
Patricio Echeverría; Makarena Arriagada	Doubles SL3–SU5	Cadenillas / Arequipeño (PER); L 10–21, 5–21	Ávila / Rojas (MEX); L 10–21, 9–21	3	Did not advance		

== Boccia ==
Men

Athlete	Event	Pool matches				Quarterfinals	Semifinals	Final / BM	
Athlete	Event	Opposition Score	Opposition Score	Opposition Score	Rank	Opposition Score	Opposition Score	Opposition Score	Rank
Germán Calderón	Individual BC1	Hayward (BER); L 2–7	Chagas (BRA); L 1–8	Págua (VEN); L 2–3	4	Did not advance			
Javier Bastías	Individual BC2	Paredes (MEX); L 2–3	Silva (BRA); L 3–4	—N/a	3	Did not advance			
Cristóbal Aranda	Individual BC3	Acosta (PER); L 4–5	Romero (COL); L 1–4	Tay (GUA); L 2–3	4	Did not advance			
Leonel Arellano	Individual BC4	Chica (COL); L 4–6	Taylor (USA); L 2–8	—N/a	3	Did not advance			

Women

Athlete	Event	Pool matches				Quarterfinals	Semifinals	Final / BM	
Athlete	Event	Opposition Score	Opposition Score	Opposition Score	Rank	Opposition Score	Opposition Score	Opposition Score	Rank
Andrea Guzmán	Individual BC2	Martínez (MEX); L 0–12	Collins (CAN); L 1–7	—N/a	3	Did not advance			
Javiera Quintriqueo	Individual BC3	Vélez (COL); W 4–3	Calado (BRA); L 3–3*	Losley (GUA); W 9–0	1 Q	Bye	Ferrando (ARG); L 1–8	Bronze medal match Callupe (PER); L 0–11	4
Alfonsina Urrejola	Individual BC4	Levine (CAN); L 0–13	Navarrete (COL); W 3–1	—N/a	2 Q	Silva (BRA); W 6–2	Chica (COL); L 0–12	Bronze medal match Manuel (MEX); L 2–7	4

Mixed

Athlete	Event	Pool matches			Semifinals	Final / BM	
Athlete	Event	Opposition Score	Opposition Score	Rank	Opposition Score	Opposition Score	Rank
Javier Bastías; Germán Calderón; Andrea Guzmán	Team BC1–BC2	Argentina; L 6–8	Mexico; W 6–4	2 Q	Canada; L 5–6	Bronze medal match Argentina; L 2–10	4
Cristóbal Aranda; Javiera Quintriqueo	Pairs BC3	DNS					
Leonel Arellano; Alfonsina Urrejola	Pairs BC4	Colombia; L 1–9	Mexico; L 2–9	3	Did not advance		

== Cycling ==
=== Road ===
Men

Athlete	Event	Time	Rank
Matías Mansilla	Time trial B	30:57.85	3rd place, bronze medalist(s)
Matías Mansilla	Road race B	2:06:38	3rd place, bronze medalist(s)
Enzo Monichi	Time trial C1–5	37:25.90	26
Enzo Monichi	Road race C1–3	1:29:51	10
Hernán Moya	Time trial C1–5	31:17.90	17
Hernán Moya	Road race C4–5	1:52:05	4
Sebastián Morales	Time trial H1–5	35:47.66	8
Sebastián Morales	Road race H3–5	1:50:47	6

Women

Athlete	Event	Time	Rank
Génesis González	Time trial C1–5	20:01.66	16
Génesis González	Road race C4–5	–1 LAP	7
Juana Tureuna	Time trial C1–5	18:52.50	15
Juana Tureuna	Road race C4–5	–1 LAP	6

=== Track ===
Men

Athlete	Event	Qualification		Final	
Athlete	Event	Time	Rank	Opposition Time	Rank
Matías Mansilla	Time trial B	—N/a		1:09.500	4
Matías Mansilla	Pursuit B	4:48.540	5	Did not advance	
Enzo Monichi	Time trial C1–5	—N/a		1:14.183	12
Enzo Monichi	Pursuit C1–3	4:08.153	6	Did not advance	
Hernán Moya	Time trial C1–5	—N/a		1:08.753	5
Hernán Moya	Pursuit C4–5	4:57.694	5	Did not advance	

Women

Athlete	Event	Qualification		Final	
Athlete	Event	Time	Rank	Opposition Time	Rank
Génesis González	Time trial C1–5	—N/a		45.225	13
Génesis González	Pursuit C4–5	4:50.314	6	Did not advance	
Juana Tureuna	Time trial C1–5	—N/a		46.874	15
Juana Tureuna	Pursuit C4–5	4:30.560	5	Did not advance	

== Football 5-a-side ==
Summary

Team	Event	Group stage						Final / BM	
Team	Event	Opposition Score	Opposition Score	Opposition Score	Opposition Score	Opposition Score	Rank	Opposition Score	Rank
Chile men's	Men's tournament	Argentina; L 0–2	Brazil; L 0–2	Peru; W 2–0	Colombia; L 0–3	Mexico; D 0–0	4 FB	Bronze medal match Argentina; L 0–2	4

Preliminary round

Pos	Team	Pld	W	D	L	GF	GA	GD	Pts	Qualification
1	Brazil	5	4	0	1	9	1	+8	12	Gold medal match
2	Colombia	5	4	0	1	9	1	+8	12	Gold medal match
3	Argentina	5	4	0	1	8	1	+7	12	Bronze medal match
4	Chile	5	1	1	3	2	7	−5	4	Bronze medal match
5	Mexico	5	0	2	3	1	9	−8	2	5th–6th place match
6	Peru	5	0	1	4	1	11	−10	1	5th–6th place match

Source: PASO
November 18
16:00

Chile	0–2	Argentina
	Report	Espinillo 24', 27'

Paralympic Training Center, Santiago
Referee: Lucio Pinheiro (Brazil)

November 19
16:00

Chile	0–2	Brazil
	Report	Alves 11'; Nonato 0'

Paralympic Training Center, Santiago
Referee: Alfredo Martínez (Mexico)

November 20
18:00

Chile	2–0	Peru
Campos 22'; Silva 29'	Report

Paralympic Training Center, Santiago
Referee: Ellen Grosskopf (Brazil)

November 22
16:00

Chile	0–3	Colombia
	Report	Pérez 6', 15'; Gonzalez 16'

Paralympic Training Center, Santiago
Referee: Lucio Pinheiro (Brazil)

November 23
20:00

Chile	0–0	Mexico
	Report

Paralympic Training Center, Santiago
Referee: Ellen Grosskopf (Brazil)

Bronze medal match

November 25
18:00

Argentina	2–0	Chile
Espinillo 10', 16'	Report

Paralympic Training Center, Santiago
Referee: Lucio Pinheiro (Brazil)

== Football 7-a-side ==
Summary

Team	Event	Group stage						Final / BM	
Team	Event	Opposition Score	Opposition Score	Opposition Score	Opposition Score	Opposition Score	Rank	Opposition Score	Rank
Chile men's	Men's tournament	United States; L 2–4	Venezuela; L 2–4	Canada; W 2–1	Brazil; L 0–4	Argentina; L 0–5	5	Fifth place match Canada; W 2–1	5

Preliminary round

18 November
14:30

Chile	2 – 4	United States
Saavedra Miranda 38'; Diaz Perez 63' (pen.)		DeLillo 16', 30'; Boyle 22'; Hammond 44'

Estadio Bicentenario de La Florida, Santiago

19 November
17:00

Venezuela	4 – 2	Chile
Quintana 25', 61' (pen.); Yari Villegas 38'; Rea Soriano 51'		Saavedra Miranda 2'; Velasquez 4'

Estadio Bicentenario de La Florida, Santiago

20 November
17:00

Canada	1 – 2	Chile
Butnaru 3'		Velasquez 39'; Del Pino 52'

Estadio Bicentenario de La Florida, Santiago

21 November
17:00

Chile	0 – 4	Brazil
		Batista de Aguiar 16'; Giovani 29', 35' da Silva 60+3'

Estadio Bicentenario de La Florida, Santiago

23 November
19:30

Chile	0 – 6	Argentina
		Morana 6', 13'; Fernandez 33'; Bassi 51', 54'

Estadio Bicentenario de La Florida, Santiago

Fifth place match

25 November
14:30

Chile	2 – 1 (a.e.t)	Canada
Velasquez 32'; Bórquez Poblete 66'

Estadio Bicentenario de La Florida, Santiago

== Goalball ==
Summary

Team	Event	Group stage				Quarterfinal	Semifinal	Final / BM	
Team	Event	Opposition Score	Opposition Score	Opposition Score	Rank	Opposition Score	Opposition Score	Opposition Score	Rank
Chile men's	Men's tournament	Mexico; W 8–4	Colombia; W 4–1	Brazil; L 0–10	2	Canada; L 1–9	Did not advance		
Chile women's	Women's tournament	Peru; W 4–2	United States; L 1–9	Canada; L 1–10	3	Argentina; L 1–6	Did not advance		

== Judo ==
Men

Athlete	Event	Round of 16	Quarterfinals	Semifinals	Repechage 1	Repechage 2	Final / BM	
Athlete	Event	Opposition Result	Opposition Result	Opposition Result	Opposition Result	Opposition Result	Opposition Result	Rank
Johann Herrera	−60 kg	González (CUB); L 00S2–10	Did not advance		Blanco (VEN); W 01S1–00S2	Gómez (ARG); L 00S1–10	Did not advance	
Yabrán Llanos	−73 kg	García (CUB); L 00–10	Did not advance		Mesquita (BRA); L 01–10	Did not advance		
Juan Riquelme	−90 kg	—N/a	Ties (USA); L 00–10	Did not advance	—N/a	Bye	Bronze medal final Goodrich (USA); L 00–10	5
Ricardo Parra	+90 kg	—N/a	Fernandes (BRA); L 00–10S1	Did not advance	—N/a		Bronze medal final Alderete (ARG); L 01–10	5

Women

Athlete	Event	Group round				Round of 16	Quarterfinals	Semifinals	Repechage	Final / BM	
Athlete	Event	Opposition Result	Opposition Result	Opposition Result	Rank	Opposition Result	Opposition Result	Opposition Result	Opposition Result	Opposition Result	Rank
Katherine Yáñez	−48 kg	Ledesma (ARG); L 00–10	Silva (BRA); L 00–10	Santos (BRA); L 00–10	4	—N/a					4
Estefanía Martínez	−57 kg	—N/a				Bye	Gómez (ARG); L 00–10	Did not advance	Lamadrid (COL); L 00–10	Did not advance	
Francisca Almanza	−70 kg	Souza (BRA); L 00–10	Boggiano (ARG); L 00–10	Hechevarría (CUB); L 00–10	4	—N/a					4

== Powerlifting ==
Men

Athlete	Event	Best lift	Rank
Javier Jiménez	–59 kg	153	2nd place, silver medalist(s)
Diego Silva	–59 kg	128	6
Jorge Carinao	–65 kg	190 PR	1st place, gold medalist(s)
Juan Carlos Garrido	–72 kg	195 PR	1st place, gold medalist(s)
Matías Reveco	–72 kg	160	6
Jonathan Astudillo	–80 kg	165	3rd place, bronze medalist(s)
Frank Feliu	–88 kg	170	6
Marcos Matamala	–97 kg	NM	

Women

Athlete	Event	Best lift	Score	Rank
Camila Campos	–50 kg & –55 kg	121 PR	109.8	1st place, gold medalist(s)
Nayadet Garcés	–50 kg & –55 kg	83	77.6	4
Sayén Cortés	–67 kg	60	—N/a	4
Marion Serrano	–86 kg & +86 kg	131	104.4	2nd place, silver medalist(s)

Mixed

Athlete	Event	Qualification		Semifinal	Final / BM	
Athlete	Event	Total lifted	Rank	Opposition Result	Opposition Result	Rank
Camila Campos; Jorge Carinao; Juan Carlos Garrido	Team	357.8	1 Q	Brazil; W 369.6–368.4	Colombia; W 355.4–117.9	1st place, gold medalist(s)
Marion Serrano; Javier Jiménez; Jonathan Astudillo	Team	313.6	2	Did not advance		
Nayadet Garcés; Matías Reveco; Frank Feliu	Team	188.4	5	Did not advance		

== Shooting ==
Men

Athlete	Event	Qualification		Final	
Athlete	Event	Score	Rank	Score	Rank
Rodrigo Encina	P1 – 10 m air pistol SH1	519	10	Did not advance	
Pablo Peña	P1 – 10 m air pistol SH1	519	11	Did not advance	
Rodolfo Urbina	P1 – 10 m air pistol SH1	457	14	Did not advance	

== Swimming ==
Men

Athlete	Event	Heat		Final	
Athlete	Event	Time	Rank	Time	Rank
Alberto Abarza	50 m freestyle S2	—N/a		1:02.33	2nd place, silver medalist(s)
Alberto Abarza	50 m backstroke S2	—N/a		1:02.03	2nd place, silver medalist(s)
Alberto Abarza	100 m freestyle S2	—N/a		2:04.54	2nd place, silver medalist(s)
Alberto Abarza	100 m backstroke S2	—N/a		2:06.98	2nd place, silver medalist(s)
Alberto Abarza	200 m freestyle S2	—N/a		4:32.94	2nd place, silver medalist(s)
Patricio Larenas	50 m freestyle S3	—N/a		56.71	3rd place, bronze medalist(s)
Patricio Larenas	50 m backstroke S3	—N/a		DNS	
Patricio Larenas	200 m freestyle S3	—N/a		4:19.48	3rd place, bronze medalist(s)
Williams Mattamala	50 m freestyle S5	40.68	8 Q	41.68	8
Williams Mattamala	50 m butterfly S5	—N/a		54.27	7
Williams Mattamala	100 m freestyle S5	1:26.29	6 Q	1:28.44	8
Williams Mattamala	200 m freestyle S5	3:01.63	4 Q	3:02.42	5
Vicente Almonacid	100 m butterfly S8	—N/a		1:12.04	4
Vicente Almonacid	100 m breaststroke SB8	1:15.71	1 Q	1:11.71	2nd place, silver medalist(s)
Vicente Almonacid	200 m individual medley SM8	—N/a		2:35.30	1st place, gold medalist(s)
Eduardo Muñoz	100 m freestyle S12	1:06.77	8 Q	1:03.78	8
Eduardo Muñoz	100 m breaststroke SB12	—N/a		1:29.19	4

Women

Athlete	Event	Heat		Final	
Athlete	Event	Time	Rank	Time	Rank
Valentina Muñoz	50 m freestyle S8	36.00	6 Q	36.01	8
Valentina Muñoz	100 m backstroke S8	1:30.28	5 Q	1:30.40	5
Valentina Muñoz	200 m individual medley SM8	DSQ		Did not advance	
Francisca Neiman	100 m breaststroke SB8	—N/a		1:42.79	4
Kiara Godoy	100 m freestyle S9	1:09.25	3 Q	1:09.77	6
Kiara Godoy	100 m butterfly S9	—N/a		1:17.90	3rd place, bronze medalist(s)
Mailyn González	100 m freestyle S9	1:09.80	5 Q	1:08.50	4
Mailyn González	400 m freestyle S9	5:38.68	6 Q	5:36.11	6
Cheila Ismail	100 m freestyle S9	1:13.97	9	Did not advance	
Cheila Ismail	100 m backstroke S9	—N/a		1:36.01	8
Cheila Ismail	100 m butterfly S9	—N/a		1:30.23	7
Cheila Ismail	400 m freestyle S9	5:59.09	8 Q	5:57.75	8
Francisca Maldonado	100 m breaststroke SB9	—N/a		1:43.33	4
Francisca Maldonado	200 m individual medley SM10	—N/a		3:19.16	7

== Table tennis ==
Men

Athlete	Event	Preliminaries					Round of 16	Quarterfinals	Semifinals	Final / BM	
Athlete	Event	Opposition Result	Opposition Result	Opposition Result	Opposition Result	Rank	Opposition Result	Opposition Result	Opposition Result	Opposition Result	Rank
Vicente Leiva	Singles C1	Godfrey (USA); W 3–2	Bustamante (ARG); L 0–3	Eberhardt (ARG); W 3–1	Fernández (CUB); L 0–3	3	—N/a				3rd place, bronze medalist(s)
Luis Flores	Singles C2	Isherwood (CAN); W 3–0	Marcião (BRA); W 3–0	Espíndola (BRA); W 3–0	Reyes (MEX); W 3–1	1	—N/a				1st place, gold medalist(s)
Cristián González	Singles C4	Sandoval (VEN); W 3–0	Pickett (USA); W 3–0	—N/a		1 Q	—N/a	Bye	González (MEX); W 3–1	Rodríguez (CHI); L 0–3	2nd place, silver medalist(s)
Maximiliano Rodríguez	Singles C4	Chaves (CRC); W 3–0	González (MEX); W 3–0	—N/a		1 Q	—N/a	Pickett (USA); W 3–1	Sánchez (MEX); W 3–0	González (CHI); W 3–0	1st place, gold medalist(s)
Cristián Dettoni	Singles C6	Prado (PER); W 3–0	Seidenfeld (USA); L 0–3	Arguello (CRC); W 3–0	—N/a	2 Q	—N/a		Torres (CHI); L 2–3	Did not advance	3rd place, bronze medalist(s)
Matías Pino	Singles C6	Torres (CHI); L 1–3	Yañez (PER); W 3–0	Altshuler (USA); W 3–0	—N/a	2 Q	—N/a		Seidenfeld (USA); L 1–3	Did not advance	3rd place, bronze medalist(s)
Ignacio Torres	Singles C6	Pino (CHI); W 3–1	Altshuler (USA); W 3–0	Yañez (PER); W 3–0	—N/a	1 Q	—N/a		Dettoni (CHI); W 3–2	Seidenfeld (USA); L 2–3	2nd place, silver medalist(s)
Claudio Bahamondes	Singles C7	Stroh (BRA); L 1–3	Khazandjian (ARG); W 3–1	—N/a		2 Q	—N/a	Vargas (COL); L 1–3	Did not advance		
Lucas Pavez	Singles C9	Leibovitz (USA); L 0–3	Reyes (CRC); W 3–1	—N/a		2 Q	—N/a	Watson (USA); L 1–3	Did not advance		
Manuel Echaveguren	Singles C10	Vargas (CRC); W 3–0	Ramírez (COL); W 3–0	—N/a		1 Q	—N/a	Muñoz (ESA); W 3–0	Antunes (BRA); W 3–0	Massad (BRA); L 0–3	2nd place, silver medalist(s)
Armin Rosas	Singles C11	Martínez (VEN); L 2–3	Sacco (USA); W 3–0	—N/a		2 Q	—N/a		Simões (BRA); L 1–3	Did not advance	3rd place, bronze medalist(s)
Luis Flores; Vicente Leiva	Doubles MD4	Eberhardt / Bustamante (ARG); W 3–0	Fernández / Nodarse (CUB); W 3–1	Marcião / Espíndola (BRA); L 0–3	—N/a	2	—N/a				2nd place, silver medalist(s)
Maximiliano Rodríguez; Cristián González	Doubles MD8	—N/a					Bye	Valencia / Sánchez (COL); W 3–1	Freitas / Moraes (BRA); W 3–0	Arabian / Silva (BRA); W 3–0	1st place, gold medalist(s)
Ignacio Torres; Matías Pino	Doubles MD14	Córdoba / Evans (PAN); W 3–0	Seidenfeld / Makkar (USA); W 3–1	—N/a		1 Q	—N/a		Arguello / Roman (CRC); W 3–0	Salmin / Stroh (BRA); W 3–1	1st place, gold medalist(s)
Claudio Bahamondes; Manuel Echaveguren	Doubles MD18	—N/a					Vasquez / Altshuler (USA); W 3–1	Neira / Pérez (ARG); W 3–1	Massad / Manara (BRA); W 3–0	Antunes / Mashki (BRA); L 2–3	2nd place, silver medalist(s)
Cristián Dettoni; Lucas Pavez	Doubles MD18	—N/a					Kent / Syed (CAN); W 3–1	Watson / Leibovitz (USA); L 0–3	Did not advance		

Women

Athlete	Event	Preliminaries				Semifinals	Final / BM	
Athlete	Event	Opposition Result	Opposition Result	Opposition Result	Rank	Opposition Result	Opposition Result	Rank
Tamara Leonelli	Singles C4–5	Miranda (ESA); W 3–0	Kuell (ARG); W 3–2	Rolph (USA); W 3–0	1 Q	Verdín (MEX); W 3–0	Kuell (ARG); W 3–2	1st place, gold medalist(s)
Almendra Ortiz	Singles C4–5	Verdín (MEX); L 0–3	Sánchez (COL); L 0–3	—N/a	3	Did not advance		
Florencia Pérez	Singles C8	Arreola (GUA); W 3–0	Lacerda (BRA); W 3–2	—N/a	1 Q	Araya (CRC); W 3–0	Kelmer (BRA); W 3–1	1st place, gold medalist(s)
Ailyn Espinoza	Singles C9–10	Alzate (COL); W 3–0	Maschio (BRA); L 0–3	Parinos (BRA); L 0–3	3	Did not advance		
Joseline Yevenes	Singles C9–10	Rauen (BRA); L 0–3	Góngora (MEX); L 0–3	—N/a	3	Did not advance		
Tamara Leonelli; Almendra Ortiz	Doubles WD5–10	Verdín / Sigala (MEX); L 0–3	Garrone / Kuell (ARG); L 0–3	Santos / Severo (BRA); L 0–3	4	Did not advance		
Ailyn Espinoza; Joseline Yevenes	Doubles WD14–20	Lacerda / Kelmer (BRA); W 3–0	Araya / Morales (CRC); W 3–0	—N/a	1 Q	Góngora / Pérez (MEX); W 3–1	Rauen / Parinos (BRA); L 0–3	2nd place, silver medalist(s)

Mixed

Athlete	Event	Preliminaries			Round of 16	Quarterfinals	Semifinals	Final / BM	
Athlete	Event	Opposition Result	Opposition Result	Rank	Opposition Result	Opposition Result	Opposition Result	Opposition Result	Rank
Almendra Ortiz; Luis Flores	Doubles XD4–7	—N/a			García / Quijada (VEN); L 1–3	Did not advance			
Tamara Leonelli; Maximiliano Rodríguez	Doubles XD10	—N/a				Blanco / Depergola (ARG); W 3–0	Verdín / González (MEX); W 3–2	Oliveira / Silva (BRA); L 0–3	2nd place, silver medalist(s)
Florencia Pérez; Ignacio Torres	Doubles XD14–17	—N/a			Bye	Chan / Syed (CAN); W 3–0	Kelmer / Carvalho (BRA); W 3–2	Parinos / Stroh (BRA); W 3–2	1st place, gold medalist(s)
Joseline Yevenes; Matías Pino	Doubles XD14–17	—N/a			Morales / Vargas (CRC); W 3–1	Muñoz / Neira (ARG); L 1–3	Did not advance		
Ailyn Espinoza; Manuel Echaveguren	Doubles XD20	Alzate / Puerto (COL); W 3–1	Maschio / Massad (BRA); W 3–1	1 Q	—N/a		Góngora / Preza (MEX); W 3–0	Rauen / Antunes (BRA); L 0–3	2nd place, silver medalist(s)

== Taekwondo ==
Men

Athlete	Event	Quarterfinals	Semifinals	Repechage	Final / BM	
Athlete	Event	Opposition Result	Opposition Result	Opposition Result	Opposition Result	Rank
Diego Carrillo	−80 kg	Gomes (BRA); L 2–8	Did not advance	Bye	Bronze medal final Lopes (BRA); L 2–30	5
Raúl Muñoz	+80 kg	Figuereo (DOM); L 7–15	Did not advance	Bye	Bronze medal final Paulo (BRA); L 0–29	5

Women

Athlete	Event	Quarterfinals	Semifinals	Final / BM	
Athlete	Event	Opposition Result	Opposition Result	Opposition Result	Rank
Constanza Fuentes	−65 kg	Martínez (COL); W 13–11	Moura (BRA); L 2–33	Did not advance	3rd place, bronze medalist(s)

== Wheelchair basketball ==
Summary

Team	Event	Group stage				Quarterfinal	Semifinal	Final / BM	
Team	Event	Opposition Score	Opposition Score	Opposition Score	Rank	Opposition Score	Opposition Score	Opposition Score	Rank
Chile men's	Men's tournament	Canada; L 17–80	Argentina; L 30–84	Venezuela; L 44–67	4	United States; L 14–88	Did not advance	Seventh place match Puerto Rico; L 54–80	8
Chile women's	Women's tournament	United States; L 10–96	Argentina; L 21–60	Peru; L 44–47	4	—N/a	5th–8th place classification Colombia; L 33–48	Seventh place match El Salvador; W 46–28	7

== Wheelchair rugby ==
Summary

Team	Event	Group stage						Semifinal	Final / BM	
Team	Event	Opposition Score	Opposition Score	Opposition Score	Opposition Score	Opposition Score	Rank	Opposition Score	Opposition Score	Rank
Chile national team	Mixed tournament	United States; L 27–62	Colombia; L 26–56	Canada; L 27–60	Argentina; L 34–77	Brazil; L 28–66	6	Did not advance	Fifth place match Argentina; L 46–64	6

== Wheelchair tennis ==
Men

Athlete	Event	Round of 32	Round of 16	Quarterfinals	Semifinals	Final / BM	
Athlete	Event	Opposition Result	Opposition Result	Opposition Result	Opposition Result	Opposition Result	Rank
Alexander Cataldo	Singles	Bye	Sánchez (COL); W 7–6^{(7–5)}, 6–1	Carneiro (BRA); W 6–1, 6–4	Ratzlaff (USA); W 7–5, 6–1	Fernández (ARG); L 2–6, 0–6	2nd place, silver medalist(s)
Brayan Tapia	Singles	Bye	Fernández (ARG); L 1–6, 2–6	Did not advance			
Alexander Cataldo; Brayan Tapia	Doubles	—N/a	Bye	Apaza / Chomba (PER); W 6–0, 6–1	Casco / Fernández (ARG); L 1–6, 6–0, [9–11]	Bronze medal match Ratzlaff / Stroud (USA); W 6–3, 6–3	3rd place, bronze medalist(s)

Women

Athlete	Event	Round of 16	Quarterfinals	Semifinals	Final / BM	
Athlete	Event	Opposition Result	Opposition Result	Opposition Result	Opposition Result	Rank
Macarena Cabrillana	Singles	Lasso (ECU); W 6–0, 6–0	Phelps (USA); W 6–3, 6–3	Bernal (COL); L 3–6, 4–6	Bronze medal match Moreno (ARG); W 4–6, 6–3, 7–6^{(7–5)}	3rd place, bronze medalist(s)
Sofía Fuentes	Singles	Meza (ECU); L 4–6, 5–7	Did not advance			
Macarena Cabrillana; Sofía Fuentes	Doubles	—N/a	Quesada / Valverde (CRC); W 6–0, 6–0	Mathewson / Phelps (USA); L 1–6, 0–6	Bronze medal match Bernal / Martínez (COL); L 1–6, 0–6	4

Quad

Athlete	Event	Round of 16	Quarterfinals	Semifinals	Final / BM	
Athlete	Event	Opposition Result	Opposition Result	Opposition Result	Opposition Result	Rank
Francisco Cayulef	Singles	Bye	McIntyre (CAN); W 6–3, 6–2	Pena (BRA); W 3–6, 6–2, 6–3	Shaw (CAN); W 6–3, 5–7, 6–4	1st place, gold medalist(s)
Diego Pérez	Singles	Bas (ARG); W 6–1, 6–1	Shaw (CAN); L 3–6, 5–7	Did not advance		
Francisco Cayulef; Diego Pérez	Doubles	—N/a	Bye	Bogdanov / Wagner (USA); W 6–4, 6–0	Pena / Silva (BRA); W 6–7^{(5–7)}, 6–2, [10–7]	1st place, gold medalist(s)

== See also ==
- Chile at the 2023 Pan American Games
- Chile at the 2024 Summer Paralympics
