= Powerlifting at the 2023 Parapan American Games – Men's 59 kg =

Men's 59 kg at the 2023 Parapan American Games
- Venue: Chimkowe Gym
- Dates: November 18
- Competitors: 6 from 4 nations

Medalists
1st place, gold medalist(s)		Herbert Aceituno	El Salvador
2nd place, silver medalist(s)		Javier Jiménez Cabrera	Chile
3rd place, bronze medalist(s)		Niel García Trelles	Peru

The men's 59 kg competition of the powerlifting events at the 2023 Parapan American Games was held on November 18 at the Chimkowe Gym in Santiago, Chile.

== Records ==
Prior to this competition, the existing world and Pan American Games records were as follows:

World record	Sherif Osman (EGY)	211 kg	Rio de Janeiro, Brazil	September 9, 2016
Parapan American Games record	Juan Garrido Acevedo (CHI)	185 kg	Lima, Peru	August 30, 2019
Americas record	Herbert Aceituno (ESA)	193 kg	Dubai, United Arab Emirates	August 28, 2023

== Results ==
The results were as follows:

Rank	Name	Body weight (kg)	Attempts (kg)				Result (kg)
Rank	Name	Body weight (kg)	1	2	3	4	Result (kg)
1st place, gold medalist(s)	Herbert Aceituno (ESA)	57.5	187	~~192~~	192		192
2nd place, silver medalist(s)	Javier Jiménez Cabrera (CHI)	57.8	147	151	153		153
3rd place, bronze medalist(s)	Niel García Trelles (PER)	58.5	144	~~147~~	151		151
4	Jacob Herbert (USA)	56.3	146	150	~~152~~		150
5	David Horvath (USA)	55.8	132	135	~~142~~		135
6	Diego Silva Herrera (CHI)	56.8	~~128~~	128	~~133~~		128
