= Powerlifting at the 2023 Parapan American Games – Men's 65 kg =

Men's 65 kg at the 2023 Parapan American Games
- Venue: Chimkowe Gym
- Dates: November 20
- Competitors: 6 from 6 nations

Medalists
1st place, gold medalist(s)		Jorge Carinao	Chile
2nd place, silver medalist(s)		Bryan Balanta	Colombia
3rd place, bronze medalist(s)		Carlos Alberto Betancourt	Venezuela

The men's 65 kg competition of the powerlifting events at the 2023 Parapan American Games was held on November 20 at the Chimkowe Gym in Santiago, Chile.

== Records ==
Prior to this competition, the existing world and Pan American Games records were as follows:

World record	Yi Zou (CHN)	222 kg	Hangzhou, China	October 24, 2023
Parapan American Games record	Herbert Aceituno (ESA)	182 kg	Lima, Peru	August 30, 2019
Americas record	Jhonny Morales (COL)	196 kg	Dubai, United Arab Emirates	August 26, 2023

== Results ==
The results were as follows:

Rank	Name	Body weight (kg)	Attempts (kg)				Result (kg)
Rank	Name	Body weight (kg)	1	2	3	4	Result (kg)
1st place, gold medalist(s)	Jorge Carinao (CHI)	64.8	185	190	~~192~~		190
2nd place, silver medalist(s)	Bryan Balanta (COL)	63.9	176	181	~~191~~		185
3rd place, bronze medalist(s)	Carlos Alberto Betancourt (VEN)	64.3	168	~~173~~	~~173~~		168
4	José Manuel Abud (DOM)	64.1	145	150	~~168~~		150
5	Miguel Mijangos (MEX)	64.0	127	133	~~136~~		133
6	Garrison Redd (USA)	62.7	~~130~~	130	~~135~~		130
