= Guatemala at the 2023 Parapan American Games =

- Flag of Guatemala
- IPC code: GUA
- NPC: Guatemalan Paralympic Committee
- Website: www.paralympic.org/guatemala

in Santiago, Chile 17 November 2023 – 26 November 2023
- Competitors: 21 in 8 sports
- Flag bearers: Andrés de León; Velveth Higueros
- Medals Ranked 19th: Gold 0 Silver 0 Bronze 1 Total 1

Parapan American Games appearances
- 2007; 2011; 2015; 2019; 2023

Guatemala is scheduled to compete in the 2023 Parapan American Games in Santiago, Chile from 17 November to 26 November 2023. This was Guatemala's fifth appearance at the Parapan American Games, having first competed in the 2007 edition.

Paralympic athlete Andrés de León and goalball player Velveth Higueros were the country's flagbearers during the opening ceremony.

== Medalists ==
The following Guatemalan competitors won medals at the games. In the discipline sections below, the medalists' names are bolded.

Medal	Name	Sport	Event	Date
Bronze	Gersson Mejía	Taekwondo	Men's 58 kg	November 23

== Competitors ==
The following is the list of number of competitors (per gender) participating at the games per sport/discipline.

Sport	Men	Women	Total
Archery	1	0	1
Athletics	4	1	5
Badminton	1	0	1
Boccia	1	1	2
Goalball	0	6	6
Taekwondo	1	0	1
Table tennis	3	1	4
Wheelchair tennis	1	0	1
Total	12	9	21

== Archery ==
Men

Athlete	Event	Ranking Round		Round of 16	Quarterfinals	Semifinals	Final / BM	
Athlete	Event	Score	Seed	Opposition Score	Opposition Score	Opposition Score	Opposition Score	Rank
Juan Diego Blas	Individual recurve open	535	5	Bye	Roca (BRA); **L** 5–6	Did not advance		

== Athletics ==
Key

- Note–Ranks given for track events are within the athlete's heat only
- **Q** = Qualified for the next round
- **q** = Qualified for the next round as a fastest loser
- N/A = Round not applicable for the event
- Bye = Athlete not required to compete in round

Men

Field events

Athlete	Event	Final	
Athlete	Event	Distance	Position
Isaac Leiva	Shot put F11	9.82	6
Andrés de León	Shot put F20	10.17	4
Johny Bryan Tian	Shot put F40/F41	5.80	6
Johny Bryan Tian	Javelin throw F41	15.78	5
Erwin Velásquez	Discus throw F64	33.70	5

Women

Track events

Athlete	Event	Semifinal		Final	
Athlete	Event	Result	Rank	Result	Rank
Ericka Esteban	100 m T38	16.11	4 **q**	15.83	7
Ericka Esteban	400 m T38	1:12.56	3 **Q**	1:14.14	5

== Badminton ==
Men

Athlete	Event	Preliminaries			Semifinals	Final / BM	
Athlete	Event	Opposition Result	Opposition Result	Rank	Opposition Result	Opposition Result	Rank
Raúl Anguiano	Singles SL4	Ávila (MEX); **L** 14–21, 15–21	Bances (PER); **L** 15–21, 21–23	3	Did not advance		

== Boccia ==
Men

Athlete	Event	Pool matches				Quarterfinals	Semifinals	Final / BM	
Athlete	Event	Opposition Score	Opposition Score	Opposition Score	Rank	Opposition Score	Opposition Score	Opposition Score	Rank
Neri Tay	Individual BC3	Romero (COL); **L** 0–10	Acosta (PER); **L** 0–9	Aranda (CHI); **W** 3–2	3	Did not advance			

Women

Athlete	Event	Pool matches				Quarterfinals	Semifinals	Final / BM	
Athlete	Event	Opposition Score	Opposition Score	Opposition Score	Rank	Opposition Score	Opposition Score	Opposition Score	Rank
Eimy Losley	Individual BC3	Calado (BRA); **L** 0–12	Velez (COL); **L** 0–14	Quintriqueo (CHI); **L** 0–9	4	Did not advance			

Mixed

Athlete	Event	Pool matches				Semifinals	Final / BM	
Athlete	Event	Opposition Score	Opposition Score	Opposition Score	Rank	Opposition Score	Opposition Score	Rank
Neri Tay; Eimy Losley	Pairs BC3	Brazil; **L** 0–12	Colombia; **L** 0–13	Canada; **L** 2–6	4	Did not advance		

== Goalball ==
Summary

Team	Event	Group stage				Quarterfinal	Semifinal	Final / BM	
Team	Event	Opposition Score	Opposition Score	Opposition Score	Rank	Opposition Score	Opposition Score	Opposition Score	Rank
Guatemala women's	Women's tournament	Mexico; **L** 2–8	Argentina; **L** 0–8	Brazil; **L** 1–11	4 **Q**	United States; **L** 0–10	Did not advance		

== Table tennis ==
Men

Athlete	Event	Preliminaries				Round of 16	Quarterfinals	Semifinals	Final / BM	
Athlete	Event	Opposition Result	Opposition Result	Opposition Result	Rank	Opposition Result	Opposition Result	Opposition Result	Opposition Result	Rank
Pedro Avendaño	Singles C3	Quijada (VEN); **L** 0–3	Valencia (COL); **L** 0–3	Copola (ARG); **L** 0–3	4	Did not advance				
Gerber Salazar	Singles C5	Romero (ARG); **L** 0–3	Moraes (BRA); **L** 0–3	—N/a	3	Did not advance				
Marcos Orellana	Singles C10	Antunes (BRA); **L** 0–3	Neira (ARG); **L** 0–3	—N/a	3	Did not advance				
Pedro Avendaño; Gerber Salazar	Doubles C8	—N/a				Sanchez / Valencia (COL); **L** 0–3	Did not advance			

Women

Athlete	Event	Preliminaries			Semifinals	Final / BM	
Athlete	Event	Opposition Result	Opposition Result	Rank	Opposition Result	Opposition Result	Rank
Anailil Arreola	Singles C8	Pérez (CHI); **L** 0–3	Lacerda (BRA); **L** 0–3	3	Did not advance		

Mixed

Athlete	Event	Preliminaries			Semifinals	Final / BM	
Athlete	Event	Opposition Result	Opposition Result	Rank	Opposition Result	Opposition Result	Rank
Marcos Orellana; Anailil Arreola	Doubles C20	Antunes / Rauen (BRA); **L** 0–3	Preza / Gongora (MEX); **L** 0–3	3	Did not advance		

== Taekwondo ==
Men

Athlete	Event	Round of 16	Quarterfinals	Semifinals	Repechage	Final / BM	
Athlete	Event	Opposition Result	Opposition Result	Opposition Result	Opposition Result	Opposition Result	Rank
**Gersson Mejía**	−58 kg	Bye	Nascimento (BRA); **W** 16–3	Marques (BRA); **L** 6–15	Bye	Bronze medal final Fernandez (PER); **W** 14–12	3rd place, bronze medalist(s)

== Wheelchair tennis ==
Men

Athlete	Event	Round of 32	Round of 16	Quarterfinals	Semifinals	Final / BM	
Athlete	Event	Opposition Result	Opposition Result	Opposition Result	Opposition Result	Opposition Result	Rank
José Girón	Singles	Manzano (ECU); **L** 1–6, 0–6	Did not advance				

== See also ==
- Independent Athletes Team at the 2023 Pan American Games
- Guatemala at the 2024 Summer Paralympics
