= El Salvador at the 2023 Parapan American Games =

- Flag of El Salvador
- IPC code: ESA
- NPC: Salvadoran Paralympic Committee
- Website: www.paralympic.org/el-salvador

in Santiago, Chile 17 November 2023 – 26 November 2023
- Competitors: 22 in 7 sports
- Flag bearers: Herbert Aceituno; Rebeca Duarte
- Medals Ranked 13th: Gold 1 Silver 1 Bronze 0 Total 2

Parapan American Games appearances
- 1999; 2003; 2007; 2011; 2015; 2019; 2023

El Salvador competed in the 2023 Parapan American Games in Santiago, Chile from 17 November to 26 November 2023. This is El Salvador's seventh appearance at the Parapan American Games, having competed at every edition of the games since the inaugural edition in 1999.

Powerlifter Herbert Aceituno and boccia player Rebeca Duarte were the country's flagbearers during the opening ceremony.

== Medalists ==
The following competitors won medals at the games. In the discipline sections below, the medalists' names are bolded.

Medal	Name	Sport	Event	Date
Gold	Herbert Aceituno	Powerlifting	Men's 59 kg	November 18
Silver	Rebeca Duarte	Boccia	Women's individual BC2	November 22

== Competitors ==
The following is the list of number of competitors (per gender) participating at the games per sport/discipline.

Sport	Men	Women	Total
Archery	1	0	1
Athletics	2	3	5
Boccia	1	1	2
Powerlifting	1	0	1
Swimming	1	0	1
Table tennis	3	2	5
Wheelchair basketball	0	7	7
Total	9	13	22

== Archery ==
Men

Athlete	Event	Ranking Round		Round of 16	Quarterfinals	Semifinals	Final / BM	
Athlete	Event	Score	Seed	Opposition Score	Opposition Score	Opposition Score	Opposition Score	Rank
Ever Lemus	Individual compound open	578	12	Correa (COL); **L** 115–144	Did not advance			

== Athletics ==
Key

- Note–Ranks given for track events are within the athlete's heat only
- **Q** = Qualified for the next round
- **q** = Qualified for the next round as a fastest loser
- N/A = Round not applicable for the event
- Bye = Athlete not required to compete in round

Men

Track events

Athlete	Event	Semifinal		Final	
Athlete	Event	Result	Rank	Result	Rank
David Pleitez	100 m T37	—		12.72	5
David Pleitez	200 m T37	—		25.87	6
David Pleitez	400 m T37	—		1:00.75	4
Gerber Ayala	100 m T47	12.35	5	Did not advance	
Gerber Ayala	400 m T47	—		55.58	6

Women

Track events

Athlete	Event	Semifinal		Final	
Athlete	Event	Result	Rank	Result	Rank
Sandra Flores	100 m T13	—		DNS	
Sandra Flores	400 m T13	—		1:11.54	4
Lucia Quijada	100 m T35	—		19.50	5
Lucia Quijada	200 m T35	—		41.37	5
Norma Salinas	100 m T37	—		15.58	7
Norma Salinas	200 m T37	—		32.34	6

== Boccia ==
Men

Athlete	Event	Pool matches			Quarterfinals	Semifinals	Final / BM	
Athlete	Event	Opposition Score	Opposition Score	Rank	Opposition Score	Opposition Score	Opposition Score	Rank
Mário Sayes	Individual BC2	Santos (BRA); **L** 0–16	Aquino (ARG); **W** 8–0	2 **Q**	Silva (BRA); **W** 5–4	Allard (CAN); **L** 1–7	Bronze medal final Cristaldo (ARG); **L** 2–5	4

Women

Athlete	Event	Pool matches			Semifinals	Final / BM	
Athlete	Event	Opposition Score	Opposition Score	Rank	Opposition Score	Opposition Score	Rank
**Rebeca Duarte**	Individual BC2	Lynch (USA); **W** 7–2	León (ECU); **W** 7–2	1 **Q**	Collins (CAN); **W** 5–0	Martínez (MEX); **L** 3–7	2nd place, silver medalist(s)

== Powerlifting ==
Men

Athlete	Event	Total lifted	Rank
**Herbert Aceituno**	–59 kg	192	1st place, gold medalist(s)

== Swimming ==
Men

Athlete	Event	Heat		Final	
Athlete	Event	Time	Rank	Time	Rank
Josué Angel	50 m freestyle S7	36.24	10	Did not advance	
Josué Angel	50 m butterfly S6	38.72	8 **Q**	38.86	8
Josué Angel	200 m individual medley SM6	3:25.86	10	Did not advance	

== Table tennis ==
Men

Athlete	Event	Preliminaries			Round of 16	Quarterfinals	Semifinals	Final / BM	
Athlete	Event	Opposition Result	Opposition Result	Rank	Opposition Result	Opposition Result	Opposition Result	Opposition Result	Rank
Javier Cordova	Singles C8	Manara (BRA); **L** 0–3	Barrientos (ARG); **L** 1–3	3	Did not advance				
Melvin Muñoz	Singles C10	Puerto (COL); **L** 0–3	Sarfaraz (GUY); **W** 3–0	2 **Q**	—	Echaveguren (CHI); **L** 0–3	Did not advance		
Josué Regalado	Singles C10	Massad (BRA); **L** 0–3	Vasquez (USA); **L** 1–3	3	Did not advance				
Javier Cordova; Melvin Muñoz	Doubles C18	—			Neira / Pérez (ARG); **L** 2–3	Did not advance			

Women

Athlete	Event	Preliminaries				Quarterfinals	Semifinals	Final / BM	
Athlete	Event	Opposition Result	Opposition Result	Opposition Result	Rank	Opposition Result	Opposition Result	Opposition Result	Rank
Josselyn Miranda	Singles C4–5	Leonelli (CHI); **L** 0–3	Rolph (USA); **L** 0–3	Kuell (ARG); **L** 0–3	4	Did not advance			
Ashley Rivera	Singles C8	Kelmer (BRA); **L** 0–3	Araya (CRC); **L** 0–3	—	3	Did not advance			

Mixed

Athlete	Event	Round of 16	Quarterfinals	Semifinals	Final / BM	
Athlete	Event	Opposition Result	Opposition Result	Opposition Result	Opposition Result	Rank
Javier Cordova; Ashley Rivera	Doubles C14–17	Vargas / Mazuera (COL); **L** 0–3	Did not advance			

== Wheelchair basketball ==
Summary

Team	Event	Group stage				Semifinal	Final / BM	
Team	Event	Opposition Score	Opposition Score	Opposition Score	Rank	Opposition Score	Opposition Score	Rank
El Salvador women's	Women's tournament	Colombia; **L** 25–68	Canada; **L** 17–69	Brazil; **L** 9–78	4	5th–8th place classification Peru; **L** 19–48	Seventh place match Chile; **L** 28–46	8

== See also ==
- El Salvador at the 2023 Pan American Games
- El Salvador at the 2024 Summer Paralympics
