= Jamaica at the 2023 Parapan American Games =

- Flag of Jamaica
- IPC code: JAM
- NPC: Jamaica Paralympic Association
- Website: www.paralympic.org/jamaica

in Santiago, Chile 17 November 2023 – 26 November 2023
- Competitors: 3 in 2 sports
- Flag bearers: Theodor Thomas; Asoysona Campbell
- Medals: Gold 0 Silver 0 Bronze 0 Total 0

Parapan American Games appearances
- 1999; 2003; 2007; 2011; 2015; 2019; 2023

Jamaica competed in the 2023 Parapan American Games in Santiago, Chile from 17 November to 26 November 2023. This was Jamaica's seventh appearance at the Parapan American Games, having competed at every edition of the games since the inaugural edition in 1999.

Paralympic athletes Theodor Thomas and Asoysona Campbell were the country's flagbearers during the opening ceremony.

== Competitors ==
The following is the list of number of competitors (per gender) participating at the games per sport/discipline.

Sport	Men	Women	Total
Archery	1	0	1
Athletics	1	1	2
Total	2	1	3

== Archery ==
Men

Athlete	Event	Ranking Round		Round of 16	Quarterfinals	Semifinals	Final / BM	
Athlete	Event	Score	Seed	Opposition Score	Opposition Score	Opposition Score	Opposition Score	Rank
Acee Green	Individual recurve open	353	11	Chismak (ARG); L 0–6	Did not advance			

== Athletics ==
Men

Track events

Athlete	Event	Semifinal		Final	
Athlete	Event	Result	Rank	Result	Rank
Theodor Thomas	400 m T20	57.78	5	Did not advance	

Field events

Athlete	Event	Final	
Athlete	Event	Distance	Position
Theodor Thomas	Long jump T20	4.93	7

Women

Track events

Athlete	Event	Semifinal		Final	
Athlete	Event	Result	Rank	Result	Rank
Asoysona Campbell	100 m T37	—N/a		15.58	6

== See also ==
- Jamaica at the 2023 Pan American Games
- Jamaica at the 2024 Summer Paralympics
