= Archery at the 2023 Parapan American Games – Men's individual recurve open =

Men's individual recurve open at the 2023 Parapan American Games
- Venue: Archery Center
- Dates: November 19 - November 22
- Competitors: 11 from 11 nations

Medalists
1st place, gold medalist(s)		Samuel Molina	Mexico
2nd place, silver medalist(s)		Eric Bennett	United States
3rd place, bronze medalist(s)		Héctor Ramírez	Colombia

The men's individual recurve open competition of the archery events at the 2023 Parapan American Games was held from November 19 to 22 at the Archery Center in Santiago, Chile.

== Schedule ==
Date	Time	Round
November 19, 2023	13:30	Ranking Round
November 20, 2023	13:50	Quarterfinals
November 20, 2023	14:30	Semifinals
November 22, 2023	13:30	Final

== Results ==
WR world record | AR area record | CR championship record | GR games record | NR national record | OR Olympic record | PB personal best | SB season best | WL world leading (in a given season)

=== Ranking round ===
The results were as follows:

Rank	Archer	Nation	Score	Note
1	Samuel Molina	Mexico	642	PR
2	Eric Bennett	United States	628	
3	Hector Ramirez	Colombia	621	
4	Heriberto Roca	Brazil	587	
5	Juan Diego Blas	Guatemala	535	
6	Simon Chismak	Argentina	532	
7	Cristian Aguirre	Chile	524	
8	Marco Huaytalla	Peru	523	
9	José Figueroa	Dominican Republic	468	
10	Álex Capó	Cuba	391	
11	Acee Green	Jamaica	353	

=== Competition rounds ===
The results during the elimination rounds were as follows:

Round of 16
9	J. Figueroa (DOM)	2	0	0	0
8	M. Huaytalla (PER)	0	2	2	2
11	A. Green (JAM)	0	0	0
6	S. Chismak (ARG)	3	3	3
7	C. Aguirre (CHI)	2	2	2
10	A. Capó (CUB)	0	0	0

Quarterfinals
1	S. Molina (MEX)	0	2	2	2
8	M. Huaytalla (PER)	2	0	0	0
5	J. Blas (GUA)	0	2	0	2	1
4	H. Roca (BRA)	2	0	2	0	1
3	H. Ramirez (COL)	2	2	0	2
6	S. Chismak (ARG)	0	0	2	0
7	C. Aguirre (CHI)	2	0	0	0
2	E. Bennett (USA)	0	2	2	2

Semifinals
1	S. Molina (MEX)	2	2	0	2
4	H. Roca (BRA)	0	0	2	0
2	H. Ramirez (COL)	0	0	0
3	E. Bennett (USA)	2	2	2

Final
1	S. Molina (MEX)	2	0	2	2
2	E. Bennett (USA)	0	2	0	0
Bronze medal match
4	H. Roca (BRA)	1	0	0	1
3	Hector Ramirez (COL)	1	2	2	1
