= Panama at the 2023 Parapan American Games =

- Flag of Panama
- IPC code: PAN
- NPC: Panamanian Paralympic Committee
- Website: www.paralympic.org/panama

in Santiago, Chile 17 November 2023 – 26 November 2023
- Competitors: 22 in 7 sports
- Flag bearers: Arístides Guevara; Keitly Escobar
- Medals Ranked 18th: Gold 0 Silver 1 Bronze 0 Total 1

Parapan American Games appearances
- 1999; 2003; 2007; 2011; 2015; 2019; 2023

Panama competed in the 2023 Parapan American Games in Santiago, Chile from 17 November to 26 November 2023. This was Panama's seventh appearance at the Parapan American Games, having competed at every edition of the games since the inaugural edition in 1999.

Paralympic shooter Arístides Guevara and parathlete Keitly Escobar were the country's flagbearers during the opening ceremony.

== Medalists ==
The following competitors won medals at the games. In the discipline sections below, the medalists' names are bolded.

Medal	Name	Sport	Event	Date
Silver	Rey Dimas Vasques	Powerlifting	Men's 72 kg	November 18

== Competitors ==
The following is the list of number of competitors (per gender) participating at the games per sport/discipline.

Sport	Men	Women	Total
Athletics	8	3	11
Boccia	0	1	1
Cycling	2	0	2
Powerlifting	1	1	2
Shooting	1	0	1
Swimming	3	0	3
Table tennis	2	0	2
Total	17	5	22

== Athletics ==
Key

- Note–Ranks given for track events are within the athlete's heat only
- **Q** = Qualified for the next round
- **q** = Qualified for the next round as a fastest loser
- N/A = Round not applicable for the event
- Bye = Athlete not required to compete in round

Men

Track events

Athlete	Event	Semifinal		Final	
Athlete	Event	Result	Rank	Result	Rank
Jhan Carlos Wisdom	400 m T20	49.17	3 **Q**	49.02	5

Field events

Athlete	Event	Final	
Athlete	Event	Distance	Position
Ruben Alfredo Pitti	Long jump T20	4.84	8
Juan Carlos Caballero	Shot put F11	8.94	7
Roger Abdiel Saavedra	Shot put F11	10.91	4
Gertrudis Ortega	Shot put F32/F33/F34	8.36	4
Francisco Cedeño	Shot put F55	9.93	4
Ruben Adriano Lansiquot	Shot put F55	8.73	6
Juan Carlos Caballero	Discus throw F11	28.32	5
Cristofer Murillo	Discus throw F56	35.21	4
Ruben Adriano Lansiquot	Javelin throw F55	20.39	5

Women

Track events

Athlete	Event	Semifinal		Final	
Athlete	Event	Result	Rank	Result	Rank
Nataly Bermudez	100 m T47	15.17	6	Did not advance	
Nataly Bermudez	200 m T47	32.05	6	Did not advance	
Keitly Escobar	400 m T20	—N/a		1:06.82	8

Field events

Athlete	Event	Final	
Athlete	Event	Distance	Position
Evelyn Ismenia de Leon	Javelin throw F54	8.10	6

== Boccia ==
Women

Athlete	Event	Pool matches			Quarterfinals	Semifinals	Final / BM	
Athlete	Event	Opposition Score	Opposition Score	Rank	Opposition Score	Opposition Score	Opposition Score	Rank
Teresa Urriola	Individual BC4	Chica (COL); **L** 0–15	Manuel (MEX); **L** 0–11	3	Did not advance			

== Cycling ==
=== Road ===
Men

Athlete	Event	Result	Rank
José Luis Martínez	Time trial B	33:35.62	5
José Luis Martínez	Road race B	–1 LAP	4
Maximo Poveda	Time trial C1–5	34:07.33	24
Maximo Poveda	Road race C4–5	–1 LAP	10

== Powerlifting ==
Men

Athlete	Event	Total lifted	Rank
**Rey Dimas Vasques**	–72 kg	194	2nd place, silver medalist(s)

Women

Athlete	Event	Total lifted	Rank
Claudia Chen Laffo	–86 kg & +86 kg	67.8	8

== Shooting ==
Men

Athlete	Event	Qualification		Final	
Athlete	Event	Score	Rank	Score	Rank
Arístides Guevara	P1 – 10 m air pistol SH1	541	6 **Q**	121.6	7

Mixed

Athlete	Event	Qualification		Final	
Athlete	Event	Score	Rank	Score	Rank
Arístides Guevara	P4 – 50 m pistol SH1	515	2 **Q**	163.7	4

== Swimming ==
Men

Athlete	Event	Heat		Final	
Athlete	Event	Time	Rank	Time	Rank
Benito Perlaza	50 m freestyle S7	37.24	11	Did not advance	
Benito Perlaza	50 m butterfly S6	41.73	9	Did not advance	
Carlos Urrunaga	50 m freestyle S9	31.91	14	Did not advance	
Luis Visuete	100 m breaststroke SB4	—N/a		3:18.26	4

== Table tennis ==
Men

Athlete	Event	Preliminaries				Round of 16	Quarterfinals	Semifinals	Final / BM	
Athlete	Event	Opposition Result	Opposition Result	Opposition Result	Rank	Opposition Result	Opposition Result	Opposition Result	Opposition Result	Rank
Francisco Córdoba	Singles C7	Kaniuka (ARG); **L** 0–3	Castro (COL); **L** 0–3	Salmin (BRA); **L** 0–3	4	Did not advance				
Julio Jesús Evans	Singles C7	Castro (MEX); **L** 0–3	Martinez (ARG); **L** 0–3	Vargas (COL); **L** 0–3	4	Did not advance				
Francisco Córdoba; Julio Jesús Evans	Doubles C14	Pino / Torres (CHI); **L** 0–3	Makkar / Seidenfeld (USA); **L** 0–3	—N/a	3	Did not advance				

== See also ==
- Panama at the 2023 Pan American Games
- Panama at the 2024 Summer Paralympics
