= 2023 Parapan American Games medal table =

- Location: Santiago, Chile

Highlights
- Most gold medals: Brazil (156)
- Most total medals: Brazil (343)

The 2023 Parapan American Games medal table is a list of National Paralympic Committees (NPCs) ranked by the number of gold medals won by their athletes during the 2023 Parapan American Games, held in Santiago, Chile from November 17 to November 26, 2023. Approximately 1,943 athletes from 31 NPCs are participating in 380 events in 17 sports.

== Sports information ==
In judo, taekwondo and table tennis two bronze medals will be awarded for each event.

Therefore, the total number of bronze medals will be greater than the total number of gold or silver medals. The following is the medal table maintained by the official website of the games.

== Medal table ==
The ranking in this table is based on information provided by the Americas Paralympic Committee and Santiago 2023 official website and is consistent with convention in its published medal tables. By default, the table is ordered by the number of gold medals the athletes from a nation have won (in this context, a "nation" is an entity represented by a National Paralympic Committee). The number of silver medals is taken into consideration next and then the number of bronze medals. If nations are still tied, equal ranking is given and they are listed alphabetically by IPC country code.

Aruba won its first ever Parapan American Games medal, a bronze medal won by Elliott Loonstra in men's 80 kg taekwondo event.

* Host nation (Chile)

Rank	NPC	Gold	Silver	Bronze	Total
1	Brazil	156	98	89	343
2	United States	55	58	53	166
3	Colombia	50	58	53	161
4	Mexico	29	46	50	125
5	Argentina	25	36	52	113
6	Chile*	16	20	15	51
7	Cuba	12	8	15	35
8	Canada	9	15	28	52
9	Ecuador	7	7	5	19
10	Venezuela	6	12	16	34
11	Peru	6	9	19	34
12	Costa Rica	4	5	3	12
13	Bermuda	1	1	0	2
13	El Salvador	1	1	0	2
15	Trinidad and Tobago	1	0	0	1
16	Dominican Republic	0	3	5	8
17	Uruguay	0	1	1	2
18	Panama	0	1	0	1
19	Aruba	0	0	1	1
19	Guatemala	0	0	1	1
19	Puerto Rico	0	0	1	1
Totals (21 entries)		378	379	407	1,164
