= Powerlifting at the 2023 Parapan American Games – Men's 72 kg =

Men's 72 kg at the 2023 Parapan American Games
- Venue: Chimkowe Gym
- Dates: November 18
- Competitors: 6 from 5 nations

Medalists
1st place, gold medalist(s)		Juan Garrido Acevedo	Chile
2nd place, silver medalist(s)		Rey Dimas Vasques	Panama
3rd place, bronze medalist(s)		Ezequiel Correa	Brazil

The men's 72 kg competition of the powerlifting events at the 2023 Parapan American Games was held on November 18 at the Chimkowe Gym in Santiago, Chile.

== Records ==
Prior to this competition, the existing world and Pan American Games records were as follows:

World record	Bonnie Gustin (MAS)	231 kg	Dubai, United Arab Emirates	August 24, 2023
Parapan American Games record	Jainer Cantillo (COL)	190 kg	Toronto, Canada	August 9, 2015
Americas record	Jainer Cantillo (COL)	201 kg	Mexico City, Mexico	April 27, 2015

== Results ==
The results were as follows:

Rank	Name	Body weight (kg)	Attempts (kg)				Result (kg)
Rank	Name	Body weight (kg)	1	2	3	4	Result (kg)
1st place, gold medalist(s)	Juan Garrido Acevedo (CHI)	69.0	193	195	~~200~~		195
2nd place, silver medalist(s)	Rey Dimas Vasques (PAN)	71.1	190	~~194~~	194		194
3rd place, bronze medalist(s)	Ezequiel Correa (BRA)	71.6	180	186	~~194~~		186
4	Jesús Cuevas (CUB)	70.6	185	~~188~~	~~190~~		185
5	Omar García (COL)	67.7	163	~~166~~	~~166~~		163
6	Matías Reveco (CHI)	71.7	150	160	~~164~~		160
