= Powerlifting at the 2023 Parapan American Games – Men's 80 kg =

Men's 80 kg at the 2023 Parapan American Games
- Venue: Chimkowe Gym
- Dates: November 20
- Competitors: 5 from 4 nations

Medalists
1st place, gold medalist(s)		Ailton Bento de Souza	Brazil
2nd place, silver medalist(s)		Martín Pérez Sandoval	Mexico
3rd place, bronze medalist(s)		Jonathan Asturdillo	Chile

The men's 80 kg competition of the powerlifting events at the 2023 Parapan American Games was held on November 20 at the Chimkowe Gym in Santiago, Chile.

== Records ==
Prior to this competition, the existing world and Pan American Games records were as follows:

World record	Roohallah Rostami (IRI)	241 kg	Bangkok, Thailand	May 7, 2021
Parapan American Games record	Francisco Palomeque Palacios (COL)	195 kg	Lima, Peru	August 31, 2019
Americas record	Jainer Cantillo (COL)	211 kg	Mexico City, Mexico	December 5, 2017

== Results ==
The results were as follows:

Rank	Name	Body weight (kg)	Attempts (kg)				Result (kg)
Rank	Name	Body weight (kg)	1	2	3	4	Result (kg)
1st place, gold medalist(s)	Ailton Bento de Souza (BRA)	79.5	183	~~186~~	~~186~~		183
2nd place, silver medalist(s)	Martín Pérez Sandoval (MEX)	78.5	~~170~~	170	172		172
3rd place, bronze medalist(s)	Jonathan Asturdillo (CHI)	79.2	~~165~~	165'	~~171~~		165
4	Porfirio Arredondo (MEX)	77.2	120	140	~~171~~		140
5	Jesús Manuel Rodríguez (DOM)	79.8	~~182~~	~~186~~	~~186~~		-
