= Dominican Republic at the 2023 Parapan American Games =

- Flag of Dominican Republic
- IPC code: DOM
- NPC: Paralympic Committee of the Dominican Republic
- Website: www.paralympic.org/dominican-republic

in Santiago, Chile 17 November 2023 – 26 November 2023
- Competitors: 22 in 7 sports
- Flag bearers: Victor Manuel De La Cruz; Manuela Jacinto
- Medals Ranked 16th: Gold 0 Silver 3 Bronze 5 Total 8

Parapan American Games appearances
- 2007; 2011; 2015; 2019; 2023

Dominican Republic is scheduled to compete in the 2023 Parapan American Games in Santiago, Chile from 17 November to 26 November 2023. This was Dominican Republic's fifth appearance at the Parapan American Games, having first competed in the 2007 edition.

Paralympic badminton player Victor Manuel De La Cruz and parathlete Manuela Jacinto were the country's flagbearers during the opening ceremony.

== Medalists ==
The following competitors won medals at the games. In the discipline sections below, the medalists' names are bolded.

Medal	Name	Sport	Event	Date
Silver	Nathanael Sanchez	Athletics	Men's javelin throw F13	November 21
Silver	Geraldo Castro	Taekwondo	Men's 63 kg	November 24
Silver	Manuela Jacinto	Athletics	Women's 400 metres T12	November 25
Bronze	Josefina Zoraida Miliano	Powerlifting	Women's 73 kg & 79 kg	November 18
Bronze	Richard González	Athletics	Men's 400 metres T12	November 22
Bronze	Diana Vivenes	Athletics	Women's 400 metres T20	November 22
Bronze	Julio Figuereo	Taekwondo	Men's +80 kg	November 25
Bronze	José Frank Rodriguez	Cycling	Men's road race C4–5	November 26

== Competitors ==
The following is the list of number of competitors (per gender) participating at the games per sport/discipline.

Sport	Men	Women	Total
Archery	1	0	1
Athletics	5	3	8
Badminton	2	1	3
Cycling	2	0	2
Powerlifting	2	1	3
Swimming	1	1	2
Taekwondo	2	1	3
Total	15	7	22

== Archery ==
Men

Athlete	Event	Ranking Round		Round of 16	Quarterfinals	Semifinals	Final / BM	
Athlete	Event	Score	Seed	Opposition Score	Opposition Score	Opposition Score	Opposition Score	Rank
José Figueroa	Individual recurve open	468	9	Huaytalla (PER); **L** 2–6	Did not advance			

== Athletics ==
Key

- Note–Ranks given for track events are within the athlete's heat only
- **Q** = Qualified for the next round
- **q** = Qualified for the next round as a fastest loser
- N/A = Round not applicable for the event
- Bye = Athlete not required to compete in round

Men

Track events

Athlete	Event	Semifinal		Final	
Athlete	Event	Result	Rank	Result	Rank
**Richard González**	100 m T12	—		DSQ	
**Richard González**	400 m T12	—		54.38	3rd place, bronze medalist(s)
Adonys Rosa	100 m T36	—		12.60	5
Adonys Rosa	400 m T36	—		58.41	4
Cristian Mejia	100 m T47	11.32	4 **q**	11.30	7
Cristian Mejia	400 m T47	—		52.07	4

Field events

Athlete	Event	Final	
Athlete	Event	Distance	Position
Wagner Astacio	High jump T42–T47/T63–T64	1.84	1
**Nathanael Sanchez**	Javelin throw F13	43.47	2nd place, silver medalist(s)
Cristian Mejia	Javelin throw F46	37.54	6

Women

Track events

Athlete	Event	Semifinal		Final	
Athlete	Event	Result	Rank	Result	Rank
Manuela Jacinto	100 m T12	DSQ		Did not advance	
Emeli Dicoudray	100 m T37	—		19.63	8
Manuela Jacinto	200 m T12	27.07	2 **q**	26.82	4
Emeli Dicoudray	200 m T37	—		DSQ	
**Manuela Jacinto**	400 m T12	1:04.00	3 **q**	1:04.45	2nd place, silver medalist(s)
**Diana Vivenes**	400 m T20	—		58.51	3rd place, bronze medalist(s)

Field events

Athlete	Event	Final	
Athlete	Event	Distance	Position
Diana Vivenes	Shot put F20	5.87	3

== Badminton ==
Men

Athlete	Event	Preliminaries			Quarterfinals	Semifinals	Final / BM	
Athlete	Event	Opposition Result	Opposition Result	Rank	Opposition Result	Opposition Result	Opposition Result	Rank
Emmanuel Mercedes	Singles SL3	Echeverría (CHI); **W** 21–10, 21–11	Puente (PER); **L** 17–21, 8–21	2 **Q**	Cardoso (BRA); **L** 19–21, 13–21	Did not advance		
Victor Manuel De La Cruz	Singles SL4	Alcaraz (USA); **W** 21–23, 21–14, 21–13	Johann (BRA); **L** 11–21, 13–21	2	Did not advance			

Women

Athlete	Event	Preliminaries				Semifinals	Final / BM	
Athlete	Event	Opposition Result	Opposition Result	Opposition Result	Rank	Opposition Result	Opposition Result	Rank
Emeli Dicoudray	Singles SL3	Ubaque (COL); **L** 14–21, 19–21	Beckenkamp (BRA); **L** 8–21, 8–21	Silva (BRA); **L** 7–21, 7–21	4	Did not advance		

== Cycling ==
=== Road ===
Men

Athlete	Event	Result	Rank
Rodny Minier	Time trial C1–5	31:26.31	19
José Frank Rodríguez	Time trial C1–5	31:24.75	18
Rodny Minier	Road race C4–5	1:52:08	5
**José Frank Rodríguez**	Road race C4–5	1:52:05	3rd place, bronze medalist(s)

=== Track ===
Men

Athlete	Event	Qualification		Final	
Athlete	Event	Time	Rank	Opposition Time	Rank
Rodny Minier	Pursuit C4–5	5:08.311	7	Did not advance	
José Frank Rodríguez	Pursuit C4–5	5:20.771	8	Did not advance	
Rodny Minier	Time trial C1–5	—		1:15.661	14
José Frank Rodríguez	Time trial C1–5	—		1:10.847	8

== Powerlifting ==
Men

Athlete	Event	Total lifted	Rank
José Manuel Abud	–65 kg	150	4
Jesús Manuel Rodríguez	–80 kg	NM	

Women

Athlete	Event	Total lifted	Rank
**Josefina Zoraida Miliano**	–73 kg & –79 kg	94.0	3rd place, bronze medalist(s)

Mixed

Athlete	Event	Qualification		Semifinal	Final / BM	
Athlete	Event	Result	Rank	Opposition Result	Opposition Result	Rank
José Manuel Abud; Jesús Manuel Rodríguez; Josefina Zoraida Miliano	Team	214.5	6	Did not advance		

== Swimming ==
Men

Athlete	Event	Heat		Final	
Athlete	Event	Time	Rank	Time	Rank
Marcos Jimenez	50 m freestyle S5	38.91	7 **Q**	38.05	5
Marcos Jimenez	100 m freestyle S5	1:30.08	8 **Q**	1:24.39	5
Marcos Jimenez	50 m backstroke S5	—		43.21	4
Marcos Jimenez	50 m butterfly S5	—		42.81	5

Women

Athlete	Event	Heat		Final	
Athlete	Event	Time	Rank	Time	Rank
Lourdes Aybar	50 m freestyle S8	38.33	10	Did not advance	
Lourdes Aybar	100 m breaststroke SB7	—		1:58.62	5
Lourdes Aybar	100 m butterfly S8	—		1:45.70	8
Lourdes Aybar	200 m individual medley SM8	3:36.88	5 **Q**	3:35.87	6

== Taekwondo ==
Men

Athlete	Event	Quarterfinals	Semifinals	Repechage	Final / BM	
Athlete	Event	Opposition Result	Opposition Result	Opposition Result	Opposition Result	Rank
**Geraldo Castro**	−63 kg	Mayor (CUB); **W** 50–42	Palacios (MEX); **W** 19–13	Bye	Torquato (BRA); **L** 16–18	2nd place, silver medalist(s)
**Julio Figuereo**	+80 kg	Muñoz (CHI); **W** 15–7	Medell (USA); **L** 7–10	Bye	Bronze medal final Pedroza (MEX); **W** 15–11	3rd place, bronze medalist(s)

Women

Athlete	Event	Quarterfinals	Semifinals	Final / BM	
Athlete	Event	Opposition Result	Opposition Result	Opposition Result	Rank
Elisabeth Geraldo	−52 kg	Bye	García (MEX); **L** 26–38	Bronze medal final Neves (BRA); **L** 17–21	4

== See also ==
- Dominican Republic at the 2023 Pan American Games
- Dominican Republic at the 2024 Summer Paralympics
