= Table tennis at the 2023 Parapan American Games =

Table tennis competitions at the 2023 Parapan American Games

- Table tennis pictogram
- Venue: Olympic Training Center
- Dates: 16 – 20 November 2023
- No. of events: 26 (15 men, 7 women, 4 mixed)
- Competitors: 132 from 18 nations

Table tennis competitions at the 2023 Parapan American Games in Santiago, Chile from 16 to 20 November. There were eleven singles events and four doubles events for men and five singles events and two doubles event for women, there were also four mixed doubles events.

The winners of the men's and women's singles events earned a qualification spot for the 2024 Summer Paralympics.

== Participating nations ==
There are 132 players from 18 nations participating in the games.

- Argentina (17)
- Brazil (26)
- Canada (5)
- Chile (16) (Host)
- Colombia (10)
- Costa Rica (8)
- Cuba (3)
- Ecuador (3)
- El Salvador (5)
- Guatemala (4)
- Guyana (1)
- Mexico (10)
- Panama (2)
- Peru (2)
- Puerto Rico (2)
- United States (13)
- Uruguay (1)
- Venezuela (4)

== Medal table ==
* Host nation (Chile)

Rank	NPC	Gold	Silver	Bronze	Total
1	Brazil (BRA)	13	13	12	38
2	Chile (CHI)*	7	8	4	19
3	United States (USA)	3	0	4	7
4	Argentina (ARG)	1	3	9	13
5	Mexico (MEX)	1	0	9	10
6	Cuba (CUB)	1	0	0	1
7	Costa Rica (CRC)	0	1	2	3
8	Venezuela (VEN)	0	1	1	2
9	Colombia (COL)	0	0	5	5
10	Canada (CAN)	0	0	1	1
10	Ecuador (ECU)	0	0	1	1
Totals (11 entries)		26	26	48	100

== Medalists ==
=== Men's events ===
Event	Class	Gold	Silver	Bronze
Men's singles	1	Yunier Fernández; Cuba	Guillermo Bustamante; Argentina	Vicente Leiva; Chile
Men's singles	2	Luis Flores; Chile	Guilherme Marcião; Brazil	Iranildo Espíndola; Brazil
Men's singles	3	Jenson Van Emburgh; United States	Fábio Souza da Silva; Brazil	Gabriel Copola; Argentina
Men's singles	3	Jenson Van Emburgh; United States	Fábio Souza da Silva; Brazil	Roberto Quijada; Venezuela
Men's singles	4	Maximiliano Rodríguez; Chile	Cristián González; Chile	Jesús Sánchez; Mexico
Men's singles	4	Maximiliano Rodríguez; Chile	Cristián González; Chile	Francisco González; Mexico
Men's singles	5	Elías Romero; Argentina	Lucas Arabian; Brazil	Cadu Moraes; Brazil
Men's singles	5	Elías Romero; Argentina	Lucas Arabian; Brazil	Mauro Depergola; Argentina
Men's singles	6	Ian Seidenfeld; United States	Ignacio Torres; Chile	Matías Pino; Chile
Men's singles	6	Ian Seidenfeld; United States	Ignacio Torres; Chile	Cristián Dettoni; Chile
Men's singles	7	Paulo Salmin; Brazil	Israel Pereira Stroh; Brazil	Aleksy Kaniuka; Argentina
Men's singles	7	Paulo Salmin; Brazil	Israel Pereira Stroh; Brazil	José David Vargas; Colombia
Men's singles	8	Luiz Filipe Manara; Brazil	Steven Roman; Costa Rica	Jean Mashki; Brazil
Men's singles	8	Luiz Filipe Manara; Brazil	Steven Roman; Costa Rica	Alejandro Pérez; Argentina
Men's singles	9	Tahl Leibovitz; United States	Lucas Carvalho; Brazil	Logan Watson; United States
Men's singles	9	Tahl Leibovitz; United States	Lucas Carvalho; Brazil	Eithan Skliarsky; Argentina
Men's singles	10	Claudio Massad; Brazil	Manuel Echaveguren; Chile	Álvaro Puerto; Colombia
Men's singles	10	Claudio Massad; Brazil	Manuel Echaveguren; Chile	Gabriel Antunes; Brazil
Men's singles	11	Thiago Simões Gomes; Brazil	Denisos Martínez; Venezuela	Armin Rosas; Chile
Men's singles	11	Thiago Simões Gomes; Brazil	Denisos Martínez; Venezuela	Angelo Suquillo; Ecuador
Men's doubles	MD4	Brazil; Guilherme Costa; Iranildo Espíndola	Chile; Luis Flores; Vicente Leiva	Not awarded
Men's doubles	MD8	Chile; Maximiliano Rodríguez; Cristián González	Brazil; Lucas Arabian; Fábio Souza da Silva	Brazil; David Freitas; Cadu Moraes
Men's doubles	MD8	Chile; Maximiliano Rodríguez; Cristián González	Brazil; Lucas Arabian; Fábio Souza da Silva	Mexico; Francisco González; Víctor Reyes
Men's doubles	MD14	Chile; Ignacio Torres; Matías Pino	Brazil; Israel Pereira Stroh; Paulo Salmin	Costa Rica; Domingo Arguello; Steven Roman
Men's doubles	MD14	Chile; Ignacio Torres; Matías Pino	Brazil; Israel Pereira Stroh; Paulo Salmin	United States; Ian Seidenfeld; Marco Makkar
Men's doubles	MD18	Brazil; Gabriel Antunes; Jean Mashki	Chile; Claudio Bahamondes; Manuel Echaveguren	United States; Logan Watson; Tahl Leibovitz
Men's doubles	MD18	Brazil; Gabriel Antunes; Jean Mashki	Chile; Claudio Bahamondes; Manuel Echaveguren	Brazil; Claudio Massad; Luiz Filipe Manara

=== Women's events ===
Event	Class	Gold	Silver	Bronze
Women's singles	1–3	Marliane Santos; Brazil	Joyce de Oliveira; Brazil	Thais Severo; Brazil
Women's singles	1–3	Marliane Santos; Brazil	Joyce de Oliveira; Brazil	María Edith Sigala; Mexico
Women's singles	4–5	Tamara Leonelli; Chile	Nayla Kuell; Argentina	Martha Verdín; Mexico
Women's singles	4–5	Tamara Leonelli; Chile	Nayla Kuell; Argentina	Nelly Sánchez; Colombia
Women's singles	6–7	Claudia Pérez; Mexico	Giselle Muñoz; Argentina	Aline Meneses; Brazil
Women's singles	6–7	Claudia Pérez; Mexico	Giselle Muñoz; Argentina	Stephanie Chan; Canada
Women's singles	8	Florencia Pérez; Chile	Sophia Kelmer; Brazil	Aneth Araya; Costa Rica
Women's singles	8	Florencia Pérez; Chile	Sophia Kelmer; Brazil	Lethícia Rodrigues Lacerda; Brazil
Women's singles	9–10	Danielle Rauen; Brazil	Jennyfer Marques Parinos; Brazil	Allana Maschio; Brazil
Women's singles	9–10	Danielle Rauen; Brazil	Jennyfer Marques Parinos; Brazil	Jeanelly Góngora; Mexico
Women's doubles	WD5–10	Brazil; Cátia Oliveira; Joyce de Oliveira	Brazil; Marliane Santos; Thais Severo	Argentina; Constanza Garrone; Nayla Kuell
Women's doubles	WD5–10	Brazil; Cátia Oliveira; Joyce de Oliveira	Brazil; Marliane Santos; Thais Severo	Colombia; Manuela Guapi; Nelly Sánchez
Women's doubles	WD14–20	Brazil; Danielle Rauen; Jennyfer Marques Parinos	Chile; Ailyn Espinoza; Joseline Yevenes	Brazil; Lethícia Rodrigues Lacerda; Sophia Kelmer
Women's doubles	WD14–20	Brazil; Danielle Rauen; Jennyfer Marques Parinos	Chile; Ailyn Espinoza; Joseline Yevenes	Mexico; Jeanelly Góngora; Claudia Pérez

=== Mixed events ===
Event	Class	Gold	Silver	Bronze
Mixed doubles	XD4–7	Brazil; Cátia Oliveira; Lucas Arabian	Brazil; Thais Severo; Eziquiel Babes	Argentina; Constanza Garrone; Elías Romero
Mixed doubles	XD4–7	Brazil; Cátia Oliveira; Lucas Arabian	Brazil; Thais Severo; Eziquiel Babes	United States; Pamela Fontaine; Jenson Van Emburgh
Mixed doubles	XD10	Brazil; Joyce de Oliveira; Fábio Souza da Silva	Chile; Tamara Leonelli; Maximiliano Rodríguez	Argentina; Nayla Kuell; Gabriel Copola
Mixed doubles	XD10	Brazil; Joyce de Oliveira; Fábio Souza da Silva	Chile; Tamara Leonelli; Maximiliano Rodríguez	Mexico; Martha Verdín; Francisco González
Mixed doubles	XD14–17	Chile; Florencia Pérez; Ignacio Torres	Brazil; Jennyfer Marques Parinos; Israel Pereira Stroh	Argentina; Giselle Muñoz; Darío Neira
Mixed doubles	XD14–17	Chile; Florencia Pérez; Ignacio Torres	Brazil; Jennyfer Marques Parinos; Israel Pereira Stroh	Brazil; Sophia Kelmer; Lucas Carvalho
Mixed doubles	XD20	Brazil; Danielle Rauen; Gabriel Antunes	Chile; Ailyn Espinoza; Manuel Echaveguren	Colombia; Yéssica Alzate; Álvaro Puerto
Mixed doubles	XD20	Brazil; Danielle Rauen; Gabriel Antunes	Chile; Ailyn Espinoza; Manuel Echaveguren	Mexico; Jeanelly Góngora; Enrique Preza

== See also ==
- Table tennis at the 2023 Pan American Games
- Table tennis at the 2024 Summer Paralympics
