= Swimming at the 2023 Parapan American Games – Men's 50 metre freestyle S2 =

Men's 50 metre freestyle S2 at the 2023 Parapan American Games
- Venue: Aquatic Centre
- Date: November 22
- Competitors: 5 from 4 nations
- Winning time: 52.09

Medalists
| 1st place, gold medalist(s) | | Gabriel Araújo | Brazil |
| 2nd place, silver medalist(s) | | Alberto Abarza | Chile |
| 3rd place, bronze medalist(s) | | Cristopher Tronco | Mexico |

The men's 50 metre freestyle S2 competition of the swimming events at the 2023 Parapan American Games were held on November 22, 2023, at the Aquatic Center within the Julio Martínez National Stadium in Santiago, Chile.

== Records ==
Prior to this competition, the existing world and Pan American Games records were as follows:

| World record | Liankang Zou (CHN) | 50.65 | Rio de Janeiro, Brazil | September 11, 2016 |
| Pan American Games record | Gabriel Araújo (BRA) | 55.86 | Santiago, Chile | November 21, 2023 |

== Results ==
| KEY: | QA | Qualified for A final | QB | Qualified for B final | PR | Games record | NR | National record | PB | Personal best | SB | Seasonal best |

=== Final ===
The results were as follows:

| Rank | Lane | Name | Nationality | Time | Notes |
|---|---|---|---|---|---|
| 1st place, gold medalist(s) | 4 | Gabriel Araújo | Brazil | 52.09 | PR |
| 2nd place, silver medalist(s) | 5 | Alberto Abarza | Chile | 1:02.33 | |
| 3rd place, bronze medalist(s) | 2 | Cristopher Tronco | Mexico | 1:05.18 | |
| 4 | 3 | Rodrigo Santillan | Peru | 1:07.19 | |
| 5 | 6 | Jesús López | Mexico | 1:09.68 | |
