= Athletics at the 2023 Parapan American Games – Men's 400 metres T12 =

Men's 400 metres T12 at the 2023 Parapan American Games
- Venue: Mario Recordón Athletics Training Center
- Dates: November 22
- Competitors: 3 from 3 nations
- Winning time: 49.04

Medalists
1st place, gold medalist(s)		Yamil Acosta	Colombia
2nd place, silver medalist(s)		Marcos Vinícius de Oliveira	Brazil
3rd place, bronze medalist(s)		Richard González	Dominican Republic

The men's T12 400 metres competition of the athletics events at the 2023 Parapan American Games was held on November 22 at the Mario Recordón Athletics Training Center within the Julio Martínez National Stadium of Santiago, Chile. Due to the event having only three competitors, only the gold and silver medals were presented.

== Records ==
Prior to this competition, the existing world and Pan American Games records were as follows:

World record	Abdeslam Hili (MAR)	47.59	Tokyo, Japan	September 2, 2021
Parapan American Games record	Jesús Manuel Martínez (MEX)	49.85	Toronto, Canada	August 10, 2015
Americas record	Noah Malone (USA)	47.93	Tokyo, Japan	September 2, 2021

== Schedule ==
Date	Time	Round
November 22, 2023	17:32	Final

== Results ==
All times shown are in seconds.

KEY:	q	Fastest non-qualifiers	Q	Qualified	PR	Parapan Games record	NR	National record	SB	Seasonal best	DQ	Disqualified

=== Final ===
The results were as follows:

Rank	Lane	Name	Nationality	Time	Notes
1st place, gold medalist(s)	3	Yamil Acosta	Colombia	49.04	PR
2nd place, silver medalist(s)	5	Marcos Vinícius de Oliveira	Brazil	51.10	
3rd place, bronze medalist(s)	7	Richard González (Guide: Fary Mejía)	Dominican Republic	54.38	
