= Athletics at the 2023 Parapan American Games – Men's 5000 metres T13 =

Men's 5000 metres T13 at the 2023 Parapan American Games
- Venue: Mario Recordón Athletics Training Center
- Dates: November 21
- Competitors: 4 from 3 nations
- Winning time: 15:30.41

Medalists
1st place, gold medalist(s)		Sixto Moreta	Ecuador
2nd place, silver medalist(s)		Noah Scherf	United States
3rd place, bronze medalist(s)		Sivaldo De Souza	Brazil

The men's T13 5000 metres competition of the athletics events at the 2023 Parapan American Games was held on November 21 at the Mario Recordón Athletics Training Center within the Julio Martínez National Stadium of Santiago, Chile.

== Records ==
Prior to this competition, the existing world and Pan American Games records were as follows:

World record	Youssef Benibrahim (MAR)	14:20.69	London, Great Britain	July 16, 2017
Parapan American Games record	Lazaro Rashid (CUB)	15:08.43	Mar del Plata, Argentina	December 9, 2003

== Schedule ==
Date	Time	Round
November 21, 2023	15:34	Final

== Results ==
All times shown are in seconds.

KEY:	q	Fastest non-qualifiers	Q	Qualified	PR	Parapan Games record	NR	National record	SB	Seasonal best	DQ	Disqualified

=== Final ===
The results were as follows:

Rank	Lane	Name	Nationality	Time	Notes
1st place, gold medalist(s)	1	Sixto Moreta	Ecuador	15:30.41	
2nd place, silver medalist(s)	2	Noah Scherf	United States	16:17.00	
3rd place, bronze medalist(s)	3	Sivaldo De Souza	Brazil	16:33.60	SB
4	4	Caleb Howard	United States	18:10.92	
