= Carlos Vargas (cyclist) =

Brazilian para-cyclist (born 1997)

Personal information
- Full name: Carlos Andrés Vargas Villanueva
- Born: 8 January 1997 (age 29)

Sport
- Country: Colombia
- Sport: Para-cycling
- Disability class: C5
Medal record
Men's para-cycling
Representing Colombia
Track World Championships
Bronze medal – third place	2025 Rio de Janeiro	Scratch race C5
Parapan American Games
Gold medal – first place	2023 Santiago	Road race C4-5
Silver medal – second place	2019 Lima	Road race C4-5
Silver medal – second place	2023 Santiago	Time trial C1-5
Silver medal – second place	2023 Santiago	Individual pursuit C4-5
Bronze medal – third place	2019 Lima	Individual pursuit C4-5
South American Para Games
Bronze medal – third place	2026 Valledupar	Road race C4-5

Carlos Andrés Vargas Villanueva (born 8 January 1997) is a Colombian para-cyclist who competes in road and track events. He represented Colombia at the 2024 Summer Paralympics.

== Career ==
In November 2023, Vargas competed at the 2023 Parapan American Games and won a gold medal in the road race C4–5 and silver medals in the individual pursuit C4-5 and time trial C1–5 events. On 27 August 2024, he was selected to represent Colombia at the 2024 Summer Paralympics. He competed in both road cycling and track cycling events. His best finish was fifth place in the mixed team sprint C1–5 event. He competed at the 2025 UCI Para-cycling Track World Championships and won a bronze medal in the scratch race C5 event.
