= Cycling at the 2023 Parapan American Games – Men's road race C4–5 =

Men's road race C4–5 at the 2023 Parapan American Games
- Venue: Streets of Isla de Maipo
- Dates: November 26
- Competitors: 12 from 9 nations
- Winning time: 1:48:58

Medalists
1st place, gold medalist(s)		Carlos Andrés Villanueva	Colombia
2nd place, silver medalist(s)		Lauro Chaman	Brazil
3rd place, bronze medalist(s)		José Frank Rodríguez	Dominican Republic

The men's individual road race C4–5 competition of the cycling events at the 2023 Parapan American Games was held on November 26 on the Streets of Isla de Maipo, Chile.

== Schedule ==
Date	Time	Round
November 26, 2023	11:45	Final

== Results ==
The results were as follows:

Rank	Class	Rider	Nation	Time
1st place, gold medalist(s)	C5	Carlos Andrés Villanueva	Colombia	1:48:58
2nd place, silver medalist(s)	C5	Lauro Chaman	Brazil	1:48:58
3rd place, bronze medalist(s)	C4	José Frank Rodríguez	Dominican Republic	1:52:02
4	C5	Hernan Moya	Chile	1:52:05
5	C5	Rodny Minier	Dominican Republic	1:52:08
6	C5	Marcel Milano	Venezuela	1:52:11
7	C5	Edwin Matiz	Colombia	1:52:11
8	C4	Andre Grizante	Brazil	1:52:12
9	C4	José Ángel Morales	Mexico	1:52:17
10	C5	Maximo Poveda	Panama	-1 LAP
11	C4	Pablo José Rosso	Uruguay	-1 LAP
12	C4	Leonel Solis	Costa Rica	-1 LAP
