= Ecuador at the 2023 Parapan American Games =

- Flag of Ecuador
- IPC code: ECU
- NPC: Ecuadorian Paralympic Committee
- Website: www.paralympic.org/ecuador

in Santiago, Chile 17 November 2023 – 26 November 2023
- Competitors: 36 in 8 sports
- Flag bearers: Jimmy Caicedo; Kiara Rodríguez
- Medals Ranked 9th: Gold 7 Silver 7 Bronze 5 Total 19

Parapan American Games appearances
- 2003; 2007; 2011; 2015; 2019; 2023

Ecuador competed in the 2023 Parapan American Games in Santiago, Chile from 17 November to 26 November 2023. This was Ecuador's sixth appearance at the Parapan American Games, having first competed in the 2003 edition.

Paralympic athletes Jimmy Caicedo and Kiara Rodríguez were the country's flagbearers during the opening ceremony.

== Medalists ==
The following Ecuadorian competitors won medals at the games. In the by discipline sections below, medalists' names are bolded.

| Medal | Name | Sport | Event | Date |
|---|---|---|---|---|
| Gold | Sixto Moreta | Athletics | Men's 5000 metres T13 | November 21 |
| Gold | Marco Churuchumbi | Athletics | Men's shot put F40/F41 | November 21 |
| Gold | Kiara Rodríguez | Athletics | Women's long jump T47 | November 21 |
| Gold | Poleth Méndes | Athletics | Women's shot put F20 | November 21 |
| Gold | Jordi Congo | Athletics | Men's shot put F20 | November 22 |
| Gold | Kiara Rodríguez | Athletics | Women's 100 metres T47 | November 25 |
| Gold | Estefany Lopez | Athletics | Women's discus throw F41 | November 25 |
| Silver | Kerly Lascano | Powerlifting | Women's 41 kg | November 18 |
| Silver | Joffre Villavicencio; Diana Gonzabay | Archery | Mixed team compound open | November 21 |
| Silver | Grecely Padilla | Athletics | Women's shot put F20 | November 21 |
| Silver | Roberto Chala | Athletics | Men's long jump T20 | November 22 |
| Silver | Frank Yepez | Athletics | Men's shot put F20 | November 22 |
| Silver | Erick Tandazo | Swimming | Men's 400 metre freestyle S9 | November 22 |
| Silver | Sixto Moreta | Athletics | Men's 1500 metres T13 | November 24 |
| Bronze | Mishelle Oyague | Powerlifting | Women's 61 kg | November 18 |
| Bronze | Angelo Suquillo | Table tennis | Men's individual C11 | November 18 |
| Bronze | Bryan Muguicha | Athletics | Men's 1500 metres T46 | November 22 |
| Bronze | Joselyn León | Boccia | Women's individual BC2 | November 22 |
| Bronze | Marco Churuchumbi | Athletics | Men's javelin throw F41 | November 23 |

Medals by sport/discipline
| Sport | 1st place, gold medalist(s) | 2nd place, silver medalist(s) | 3rd place, bronze medalist(s) | Total |
| Athletics | 7 | 4 | 2 | **13** |
| Powerlifting | 0 | 1 | 1 | **2** |
| Archery | 0 | 1 | 0 | **1** |
| Swimming | 0 | 1 | 0 | **1** |
| Boccia | 0 | 0 | 1 | **1** |
| Table tennis | 0 | 0 | 1 | **1** |
| **Total** | **7** | **7** | **5** | **19** |

Medals by day
| Day | 1st place, gold medalist(s) | 2nd place, silver medalist(s) | 3rd place, bronze medalist(s) | Total |
| 18 November | 0 | 1 | 2 | 3 |
| 19 November | 0 | 0 | 0 | 0 |
| 20 November | 0 | 0 | 0 | 0 |
| 21 November | 4 | 2 | 0 | 6 |
| 22 November | 1 | 3 | 2 | 6 |
| 23 November | 0 | 0 | 1 | 1 |
| 24 November | 0 | 1 | 0 | 1 |
| 25 November | 2 | 0 | 0 | 2 |
| 26 November | 0 | 0 | 0 | 0 |
| **Total** | **7** | **7** | **5** | **19** |

Medals by gender
| **Gender** | 1st place, gold medalist(s) | 2nd place, silver medalist(s) | 3rd place, bronze medalist(s) | **Total** |
| Male | 3 | 4 | 3 | 10 |
| Female | 4 | 2 | 2 | 8 |
| Mixed | 0 | 1 | 0 | 1 |
| **Total** | **7** | **7** | **5** | **19** |

== Competitors ==
The following is the list of number of competitors (per gender) participating at the games per sport/discipline.

| Sport | Men | Women | Total |
|---|---|---|---|
| Archery | 1 | 1 | 2 |
| Athletics | 12 | 4 | 16 |
| Boccia | 1 | 2 | 3 |
| Powerlifting | 2 | 2 | 4 |
| Swimming | 1 | 1 | 2 |
| Table tennis | 3 | 0 | 3 |
| Taekwondo | 1 | 0 | 1 |
| Wheelchair tennis | 3 | 2 | 5 |
| Total | 24 | 12 | 36 |

== Archery ==
Men

| Athlete | Event | Ranking Round | | Round of 16 | Quarterfinals | Semifinals | Final / BM | |
| Athlete | Event | Score | Seed | Opposition Score | Opposition Score | Opposition Score | Opposition Score | Rank |
|---|---|---|---|---|---|---|---|---|
| Joffre Villavicencio | Individual compound open | 625 | 10 | Rosario (PUR); W 130–112 | Tremblay (CAN); L 126–139 | Did not advance | | |

Women

| Athlete | Event | Ranking Round | | Round of 16 | Quarterfinals | Semifinals | Final / BM | |
| Athlete | Event | Score | Seed | Opposition Score | Opposition Score | Opposition Score | Opposition Score | Rank |
|---|---|---|---|---|---|---|---|---|
| Diana Gonzabay | Individual compound open | 648 | 4 | Bye | Gardner (USA); L 137–138 | Did not advance | | |

Mixed

| Athlete | Event | Ranking Round | | Quarterfinals | Semifinals | Final / BM | |
| Athlete | Event | Score | Seed | Opposition Score | Opposition Score | Opposition Score | Rank |
|---|---|---|---|---|---|---|---|
| Joffre Villavicencio; Diana Gonzabay | Team compound open | 1273 | 7 | Costa Rica; W 147–143 | Colombia; W 163–160 | United States; L 143–148 | 2nd place, silver medalist(s) |

== Athletics ==
Key

- Note–Ranks given for track events are within the athlete's heat only
- Q = Qualified for the next round
- q = Qualified for the next round as a fastest loser
- N/A = Round not applicable for the event
- Bye = Athlete not required to compete in round

Men

Track events

| Athlete | Event | Semifinal | | Final | |
| Athlete | Event | Result | Rank | Result | Rank |
|---|---|---|---|---|---|
| Anthony Rojas | 100 m T35 | 13.52 | 4 q | 13.53 | 8 |
| Anthony Rojas | 200 m T35 | 28.01 | 5 q | 27.49 | 6 |
| Anderson Colorado | 400 m T20 | 49.74 | 2 Q | 48.46 | 4 |
| Steven Arboleda | 400 m T47 | —N/a | | DNS | |
| Jimmy Caicedo | 1500 m T11 | 4:26.94 | 2 Q | DSQ | |
| Sixto Moreta | 1500 m T13 | —N/a | | 4:02.95 | 2nd place, silver medalist(s) |
| Juan Gabriel Pugo | 1500 m T20 | —N/a | | 4:17.31 | 6 |
| Bryan Muguicha | 1500 m T46 | —N/a | | 4:16.67 | 3rd place, bronze medalist(s) |
| Jimmy Caicedo | 5000 m T11 | —N/a | | 16:18.97 | 4 |
| Sixto Moreta | 5000 m T13 | —N/a | | 15:30.41 | 1st place, gold medalist(s) |

Field events

| Athlete | Event | Final | |
| Athlete | Event | Distance | Position |
|---|---|---|---|
| Alex Chala | Long jump T20 | 6.89 | 4 |
| Roberto Chala | Long jump T20 | 7.08 | 2nd place, silver medalist(s) |
| Jordi Congo | Shot put F20 | 15.52 | 1st place, gold medalist(s) |
| Frank Yepez | Shot put F20 | 14.20 | 2nd place, silver medalist(s) |
| Marco Churuchumbi | Shot put F40/F41 | 9.42 | 1st place, gold medalist(s) |
| Marco Churuchumbi | Javelin throw F41 | 29.92 | 3rd place, bronze medalist(s) |

Women

Track events

| Athlete | Event | Semifinal | | Final | |
| Athlete | Event | Result | Rank | Result | Rank |
|---|---|---|---|---|---|
| Kiara Rodríguez | 100 m T47 | 12.10 | 1 Q | 11.96 | 1st place, gold medalist(s) |

Field events

| Athlete | Event | Final | |
| Athlete | Event | Distance | Position |
|---|---|---|---|
| Kiara Rodríguez | Long jump T47 | 5.94 | 1st place, gold medalist(s) |
| Poleth Méndes | Shot put F20 | 13.91 | 1st place, gold medalist(s) |
| Grecely Padilla | Shot put F20 | 12.05 | 2nd place, silver medalist(s) |
| Estefany Lopez | Shot put F40/F41 | 7.81 | 4 |
| Estefany Lopez | Discus throw F41 | 28.25 | 1st place, gold medalist(s) |

== Boccia ==
Men

| Athlete | Event | Pool matches | | | Quarterfinals | Semifinals | Final / BM | |
| Athlete | Event | Opposition Score | Opposition Score | Rank | Opposition Score | Opposition Score | Opposition Score | Rank |
|---|---|---|---|---|---|---|---|---|
| Jorge Delgado | Individual BC2 | Cristaldo (ARG); L 1–7 | Allard (CAN); L 1–11 | 3 | Did not advance | | | |

Women

| Athlete | Event | Pool matches | | | | Semifinals | Final / BM | |
| Athlete | Event | Opposition Score | Opposition Score | Opposition Score | Rank | Opposition Score | Opposition Score | Rank |
|---|---|---|---|---|---|---|---|---|
| Dayana Quiroz | Individual BC1 | Oliveira (BRA); L 1–13 | Desilva-Andrade (BER); L 2–5 | Flores (ARG); L 0–7 | 4 | —N/a | | 4 |
| Joselyn León | Individual BC2 | Lynch (USA); W 4–2 | Duarte (ESA); L 2–7 | —N/a | 2 Q | Martínez (MEX); L 3–4 | Bronze medal final Collins (CAN); W 3–2 | 3rd place, bronze medalist(s) |

Mixed

| Athlete | Event | Pool matches | | | Semifinals | Final / BM | |
| Athlete | Event | Opposition Score | Opposition Score | Rank | Opposition Score | Opposition Score | Rank |
|---|---|---|---|---|---|---|---|
| Jorge Delgado; Joselyn León; Dayana Quiroz | Team BC1–BC2 | Brazil; L 4–17 | Canada; L 1–11 | 3 | Did not advance | | |

== Powerlifting ==
Men

| Athlete | Event | Total lifted | Rank |
|---|---|---|---|
| Jonathan Echeverría | –54 kg | 146 | 5 |
| Steven Cruz Mendes | –97 kg | 145 | 5 |

Women

| Athlete | Event | Total lifted | Rank |
|---|---|---|---|
| Kerly Lascano | –41 kg | 100 | 2nd place, silver medalist(s) |
| Mishelle Oyague | –61 kg | 88 | 3rd place, bronze medalist(s) |

Mixed

| Athlete | Event | Qualification | | Semifinal | Final / BM | |
| Athlete | Event | Result | Rank | Opposition Result | Opposition Result | Rank |
|---|---|---|---|---|---|---|
| Jonathan Echeverría; Steven Cruz Mendes; Kerly Lascano | Team | 272.7 | 4 | Did not advance | | |

== Swimming ==
Men

| Athlete | Event | Heat | | Final | |
| Athlete | Event | Time | Rank | Time | Rank |
|---|---|---|---|---|---|
| Erick Tandazo | 50 m freestyle S9 | 28.13 | 6 Q | 28.24 | 6 |
| Erick Tandazo | 400 m freestyle S9 | 4:41.11 | 2 Q | 4:35.08 | 2nd place, silver medalist(s) |
| Erick Tandazo | 100 m backstroke S9 | 1:15.09 | 8 Q | 1:12.80 | 7 |
| Erick Tandazo | 100 m butterfly S9 | 1:07.78 | 7 Q | 1:07.00 | 6 |

Women

| Athlete | Event | Heat | | Final | |
| Athlete | Event | Time | Rank | Time | Rank |
|---|---|---|---|---|---|
| Mayte Ortega | 400 m freestyle S9 | 6:00.62 | 9 | Did not advance | |
| Mayte Ortega | 100 m butterfly S9 | —N/a | | 1:32.49 | 8 |

== Table tennis ==
Men

| Athlete | Event | Preliminaries | | | | Round of 16 | Quarterfinals | Semifinals | Final / BM | |
| Athlete | Event | Opposition Result | Opposition Result | Opposition Result | Rank | Opposition Result | Opposition Result | Opposition Result | Opposition Result | Rank |
|---|---|---|---|---|---|---|---|---|---|---|
| Paul Polo | Singles C8 | Roman (CRC); L 0–3 | Preza (MEX); W 3–1 | —N/a | 2 Q | —N/a | Mashki (BRA); L 1–3 | Did not advance | | |
| Diego Sarmiento | Singles C9 | Watson (USA); L 0–3 | Rivera (PUR); L 0–3 | Syed (CAN); L 0–3 | 4 | Did not advance | | | | |
| Angelo Suquillo | Singles C11 | Simões (BRA); L 0–3 | Vazquez (MEX); W 3–1 | —N/a | 2 Q | —N/a | | Martinez (VEN); L 0–3 | Did not advance | 3rd place, bronze medalist(s) |
| Paul Polo; Diego Sarmiento | Doubles C18 | —N/a | | | | Massad / Manara (BRA); L 0–3 | Did not advance | | | |

== Taekwondo ==
Men

| Athlete | Event | Round of 16 | Quarterfinals | Semifinals | Repechage | Final / BM | |
| Athlete | Event | Opposition Result | Opposition Result | Opposition Result | Opposition Result | Opposition Result | Rank |
|---|---|---|---|---|---|---|---|
| Jordy Espinoza | −58 kg | Andrade (VEN); L 5–36 | Did not advance | | | | |

== Wheelchair tennis ==
Men

| Athlete | Event | Round of 32 | Round of 16 | Quarterfinals | Semifinals | Final / BM | |
| Athlete | Event | Opposition Result | Opposition Result | Opposition Result | Opposition Result | Opposition Result | Rank |
|---|---|---|---|---|---|---|---|
| Francisco Beltrán | Singles | Sánchez (COL); L 1–6, 1–6 | Did not advance | | | | |
| Eduardo Manzano | Singles | Girón (GUA); W 6–1, 6–0 | Gil (CRC); L 4–6, 0–6 | Did not advance | | | |
| Francisco Beltrán; Eduardo Manzano | Doubles | —N/a | Henderson / Venos (CAN); L 0–6, 3–6 | Did not advance | | | |

Women

| Athlete | Event | Round of 16 | Quarterfinals | Semifinals | Final / BM | |
| Athlete | Event | Opposition Result | Opposition Result | Opposition Result | Opposition Result | Rank |
|---|---|---|---|---|---|---|
| Carolina Lasso | Singles | Cabrillana (CHI); L 0–6, 0–6 | Did not advance | | | |
| Alexandra Meza | Singles | Fuentes (CHI); W 6–4, 7–5 | Mathewson (USA); L 1–6, 1–6 | Did not advance | | |
| Carolina Lasso; Alexandra Meza | Doubles | —N/a | Alves / Duval (BRA); L 0–6, 0–6 | Did not advance | | |

Quad

| Athlete | Event | Round of 16 | Quarterfinals | Semifinals | Final / BM | |
| Athlete | Event | Opposition Result | Opposition Result | Opposition Result | Opposition Result | Rank |
|---|---|---|---|---|---|---|
| Edison Molina | Singles | McIntyre (CAN); L 2–6, 3–6 | Did not advance | | | |

== See also ==
- Ecuador at the 2023 Pan American Games
- Ecuador at the 2024 Summer Paralympics
