= Swimming at the 2023 Parapan American Games – Men's 50 metre freestyle S3 =

Men's 50 metre freestyle S3 at the 2023 Parapan American Games
- Venue: Aquatic Centre
- Date: November 22
- Competitors: 6 from 4 nations
- Winning time: 46.88

Medalists
1st place, gold medalist(s)		Diego López Díaz	Mexico
2nd place, silver medalist(s)		Marcos Zarate	Mexico
3rd place, bronze medalist(s)		Patricio Larenas	Chile

The men's 50 metre freestyle S3 competition of the swimming events at the 2023 Parapan American Games were held on November 22, 2023, at the Aquatic Center within the Julio Martínez National Stadium in Santiago, Chile.

== Records ==
Prior to this competition, the existing world and Pan American Games records were as follows:

World record	Wenpan Huang (CHN)	38.81	Mexico City, Mexico	December 6, 2017
Pan American Games record	Diego López Díaz (MEX)	47.11	Lima, Peru	August 30, 2019

== Results ==
KEY:	QA	Qualified for A final	QB	Qualified for B final	PR	Games record	NR	National record	PB	Personal best	SB	Seasonal best

=== Final ===
The results were as follows:

Rank	Lane	Name	Nationality	Time	Notes
1st place, gold medalist(s)	4	Diego López Díaz	Mexico	46.88	PR
2nd place, silver medalist(s)	5	Marcos Zarate	Mexico	52.05	
3rd place, bronze medalist(s)	3	Patricio Larenas	Chile	56.71	
4	6	José Silva	Peru	1:06.05	
5	2	Daniel Chávez	Mexico	1:12.81	
6	7	José Montilla	Venezuela	1:15.87	
