= Marion Serrano =

Chilean Paralympic powerlifter

Personal information
- Full name: Marion Alejandra Serrano Guajardo
- Born: 8 September 1999 (age 26) Santiago, Chile

Sport
- Country: Chile
- Sport: Paralympic powerlifting
- Disability: Spastic diplegia
- Weight class: 86 kg
Medal record
Women's paralympic powerlifting
Representing Chile
Paralympic Games
Bronze medal – third place	2024 Paris	86 kg
Parapan American Games
Silver medal – second place	2023 Santiago	86 kg & +86 kg
Bronze medal – third place	2019 Lima	79 kg & 86 kg
South American Para Games
Silver medal – second place	2026 Valledupar	86 kg & +86 kg
Silver medal – second place	2026 Valledupar	Mixed team

Marion Alejandra Serrano Guajardo (born 8 September 1999) is a Chilean Paralympic powerlifter.

== Career ==
Serrano made her international debut at the 2017 Youth Parapan American Games, where she won a gold medal in the women's up to 79 kg event with a junior world record lift of 92 kg. She later competed at the 2017 World Para Powerlifting Championships, setting a new junior world record of 98 kg.

In 2023, Serrano competed at the Parapan American Games, winning a silver medal in the 86 kg & +86 kg event. Shen then represented Chile at the 2024 Summer Paralympics, securing a bronze medal in the 86 kg event.
