= Marliane Amaral Santos =

Brazilian Paralympic table tennis player

Personal information
- Born: 14 September 1991 (age 34) Medina, Minas Gerais, Brazil

Sport
- Country: Brazil
- Sport: Para table tennis
Medal record
Para table tennis
Representing Brazil
World Championships
Bronze medal – third place	2022 Lasko	Doubles C5
Parapan American Games
Gold medal – first place	2023 Santiago	Singles C1-3
Gold medal – first place	2019 Lima	Teams C2-5
Silver medal – second place	2023 Santiago	Doubles C5-10
Silver medal – second place	2019 Lima	Singles C2-3

Marliane Amaral Santos (born 14 September 1991) is a Brazilian para table tennis player who competes in international table tennis competitions. She is a World bronze medalist and double Parapan American Games champion. She also competed at the 2020 Summer Paralympics.

Amaral Santos had schistosomiasis causing quadriplegia aged fifteen after being in contact with parasitic worms in fresh water.
