= Luis Flores (table tennis) =

Chilean para table tennis player

Personal information
- Full name: Luis Rodrigo Bustamante Flores
- Born: 30 October 1987 (age 38) Yerbas Buenas, Chile

Sport
- Country: Chile
- Sport: Para table tennis
- Disability: Spinal cord injury
- Disability class: C2
Medal record
Para table tennis
Representing Chile
Parapan American Games
Gold medal – first place	2023 Santiago	Singles C2
Silver medal – second place	2019 Lima	Singles C2
Silver medal – second place	2019 Lima	Teams C1-2
Silver medal – second place	2023 Santiago	Doubles MD4
Pan American Championships
Gold medal – first place	2017 San Jose	Teams C3
Bronze medal – third place	2017 San Jose	Singles C2

Luis Rodrigo Bustamante Flores (born 30 October 1987) is a Chilean para table tennis player who competes in international table tennis competitions. He is a Parapan American Games champion and Pan American champion. He has also competed at the 2020 Summer Paralympics where he lost in the round of 16.

Flores had a stroke aged 18 which led to him to use a wheelchair.
