= Archery at the 2023 Parapan American Games =

Archery competitions at the 2023 Parapan American Games

- Archery pictogram
- Venue: Archery Center
- Dates: 19 – 22 November 2023
- No. of events: 8 (3 men, 3 women, 2 mixed)
- Competitors: 48 from 17 nations

Archery competitions at the 2023 Parapan American Games in Santiago, Chile were held between 19 and 22 November 2023 at the Archery Center in Peñalolén.

The winners of the men's and women's individual events earned a qualification spot for the 2024 Summer Paralympics.

== Participating nations ==
There are 48 archers from 17 nations participating.

- Argentina (4)
- Brazil (5)
- Canada (1)
- Chile (6) (Host)
- Colombia (4)
- Costa Rica (2)
- Cuba (2)
- Dominican Republic (1)
- Ecuador (2)
- El Salvador (1)
- Guatemala (1)
- Jamaica (1)
- Mexico (4)
- Peru (3)
- Puerto Rico (1)
- United States (9)
- Venezuela (1)

== Medal summary ==
=== Medal table ===
* Host nation (Chile)

Rank	NPC	Gold	Silver	Bronze	Total
1	United States (USA)	4	2	2	8
2	Costa Rica (CRC)	1	1	0	2
3	Mexico (MEX)	1	0	1	2
4	Brazil (BRA)	1	0	0	1
4	Peru (PER)	1	0	0	1
6	Colombia (COL)	0	2	2	4
7	Chile (CHI)*	0	2	1	3
8	Ecuador (ECU)	0	1	0	1
9	Canada (CAN)	0	0	1	1
Totals (9 entries)		8	8	7	23

=== Medalists ===
==== Men's events ====
Event	Class	Gold	Silver	Bronze
Individual	W1	Eugênio Franco; Brazil	Jason Tabansky; United States	Víctor Saiz; Chile
Individual compound	Open	Kevin Polish; United States	Diego Quesada; Costa Rica	Kyle Tremblay; Canada
Individual recurve	Open	Samuel Molina; Mexico	Eric Bennett; United States	Hector Ramirez; Colombia

==== Women's events ====
Event	Class	Gold	Silver	Bronze
Individual	W1	Tracy Otto; United States	Mariela López; Chile	Not awarded as three athletes competed
Individual compound	Open	Pilar Riveros; Costa Rica	Mariana Zúñiga; Chile	Wendy Gardner; United States
Individual recurve	Open	Daniela Campos; Peru	Monica Daza; Colombia	Candice Caesar; United States

==== Mixed events ====
Event	Class	Gold	Silver	Bronze
Team compound	Open	United States; Wendy Gardner; Kevin Polish	Ecuador; Diana Gonzabay; Joffre Villavicencio	Colombia; Yasneide Peñaranda; Cristian Correa
Team recurve	Open	United States; Eric Bennett; Candice Caesar	Colombia; Monica Daza; Hector Ramirez	Mexico; Karen Rocha; Samuel Molina

== See also ==
- Archery at the 2023 Pan American Games
- Archery at the 2024 Summer Paralympics
