= Jorge Carinao =

Chilean paralympic powerlifter (born 1991)

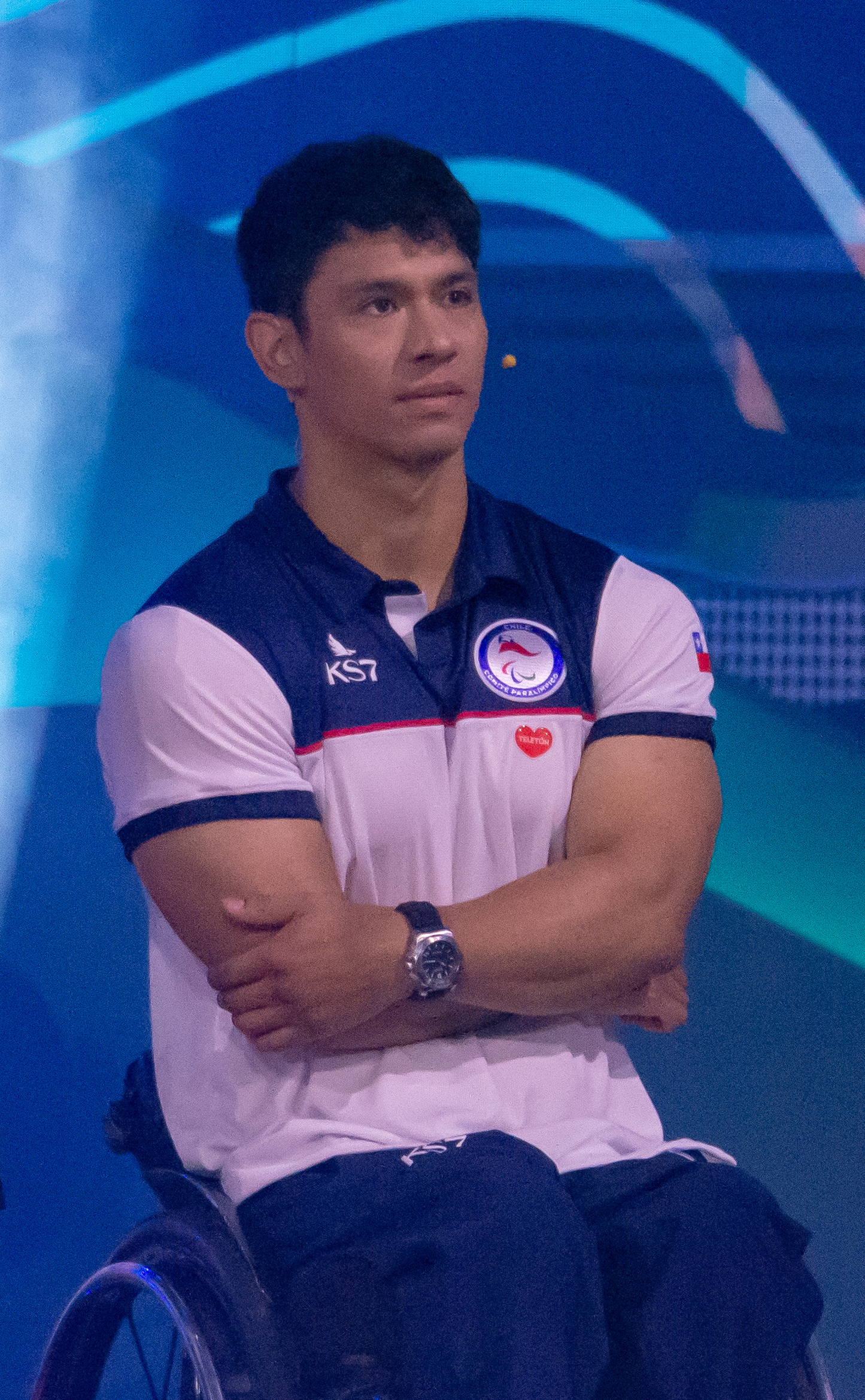
- Carinao at Teletón 2023

Personal information
- Nationality: Chilean
- Born: February 18, 1991 (age 35) Temuco, Chile

Sport
- Country: Chile
- Sport: Powerlifting
Medal record
Powerlifting
Representing Chile
World Championships
Gold medal – first place	2021 Tbilisi	Mixed team
Gold medal – first place	2025 Cairo	65 kg Total lift
Parapan American Games
Gold medal – first place	2015 Toronto	54 kg
Gold medal – first place	2023 Santiago	65 kg
Gold medal – first place	2023 Santiago	Mixed team
Silver medal – second place	2019 Lima	65 kg

Jorge Eduardo Carinao Cárdenas (born 18 February 1991) is a Chilean paralympic powerlifter. He is a two-time gold medalist at the World Championships and three-time gold medalist at the Parapan American Games. He has also participated in the Summer Paralympic Games three times.

== Early life ==
Of Mapuche origin, Jorge Eduardo Carinao Cárdenas was born in Temuco on 18 February 1991. The son of Carinao and Mónica Alicia Cárdenas Muñoz, he has lived most of his life in Padre Las Casas.

== Career ==
In December 2008, Carinao was the most promising Chilean weightlifter. At 16, he placed second at the Pan American Games in the under-17 category, while in Chile he won adult championships and broke youth records. He became paraplegic while training in weightlifting. His accident occurred after an implement fell on him. At that time, Carinao turned to his family and friends for refuge, but that didn't fulfill him. Before the trauma, he dedicated himself full-time to his sport, so there was a big void to fill. However, he didn't give up and returned to this sport.

In Guadalajara 2011, Carabao fell in love with the sport again, although to do so he had to overcome the typical apprehensions. He went on to finished sixth. In the 2015 Parapan American Games, he won a gold medal. Making his Paralympic debut, he finished in sixth place at the 2016 Summer Paralympics.

At the 2021 World Championships, Carinao finished in seventh place in the 65 kg category and set a Pan American record with 190 kg. He also won gold in the team competition.

In November 2023, Carinao won a gold medal for Chile in para-powerlifting at the Parapan American Games held in Santiago. After this victory, he approached his girlfriend Camila Shneider to propose to her.

At the 2025 World Championships, Carinao won the gold medal in the 65 kg event, in the seniors total lift.
