= Garrison Redd =

American Paralympic athlete

Garrison Redd (born 1988) is an American paralympic athlete. He was a Team USA Paralympic powerlifter. A former high school football player, Redd was paralyzed in 2005 after being struck by a stray bullet outside his home in Brownsville, Brooklyn. The bullet burned the nerves in his spine leaving him paralyzed from the waist down.

In February 2018, Redd was chosen as a TEDx speaker.

Redd competed in a national qualifier held at Logan University to represent Team USA in Bogotá, Colombia.

Redd is also involved with the Christopher and Dana Reeve Foundation.
