= Taekwondo at the 2023 Parapan American Games =

Taekwondo competitions at the 2023 Parapan American Games

- Taekwondo pictogram
- Venue: Contact Sports Center
- Dates: 23 – 25 November 2023
- No. of events: 10 (5 men, 5 women)
- Competitors: 68 from 15 nations

Taekwondo competitions at the 2023 Parapan American Games in Santiago, Chile were held at the Contact Sports Center from 23 to 25 November 2023.

== Participating nations ==
There are 68 taekwondo practitioners from 15 nations participating.

- Argentina (4)
- Aruba (1)
- Brazil (20)
- Chile (3) (Host)
- Colombia (4)
- Costa Rica (1)
- Cuba (7)
- Dominican Republic (3)
- Ecuador (1)
- Guatemala (1)
- Mexico (12)
- Peru (3)
- Puerto Rico (1)
- United States (4)
- Venezuela (3)

== Medal summary ==
=== Medal table ===
* Host nation (Chile)

Rank	Nation	Gold	Silver	Bronze	Total
1	Brazil	4	3	9	16
2	Mexico	2	5	2	9
3	Argentina	1	0	0	1
3	Costa Rica	1	0	0	1
3	Peru	1	0	0	1
3	United States	1	0	0	1
7	Cuba	0	1	3	4
8	Dominican Republic	0	1	1	2
9	Aruba	0	0	1	1
9	Chile*	0	0	1	1
9	Guatemala	0	0	1	1
9	Venezuela	0	0	1	1
Totals (12 entries)		10	10	19	39

=== Medalists ===
==== Men's events ====
Event	Gold	Silver	Bronze
58 kg	Iván Torres; Mexico	Fabrício Marques; Brazil	Cicero do Nascimento; Brazil
58 kg	Iván Torres; Mexico	Fabrício Marques; Brazil	Gersson Mejía; Guatemala
63 kg	Nathan Torquato; Brazil	Geraldo Castro; Dominican Republic	Jair Liborio; Mexico
63 kg	Nathan Torquato; Brazil	Geraldo Castro; Dominican Republic	Marco Mayor; Cuba
70 kg	Juan Samorano; Argentina	Mitchel Suarez; Cuba	Carlos Coelho; Brazil
70 kg	Juan Samorano; Argentina	Mitchel Suarez; Cuba	Ehécatl Cano; Mexico
80 kg	Andrés Molina; Costa Rica	Luis Najera; Mexico	Claro Lopes; Brazil
80 kg	Andrés Molina; Costa Rica	Luis Najera; Mexico	Elliott Loonstra; Aruba
+80 kg	Evan Medell; United States	Lucas Moraes; Brazil	Julio Figuereo; Dominican Republic
+80 kg	Evan Medell; United States	Lucas Moraes; Brazil	Pedro Paulo; Brazil

==== Women's events ====
Event	Gold	Silver	Bronze
47 kg	Leonor Espinoza; Peru	Claudia Romero; Mexico	Lilisbet Rodríguez; Cuba
47 kg	Leonor Espinoza; Peru	Claudia Romero; Mexico	Teresinha Correia; Brazil
52 kg	Maria Eduarda Stumpf; Brazil	Jessica García; Mexico	Cristhiane Neves; Brazil
57 kg	Silvana Fernandes; Brazil	Elsa Koyama; Mexico	Larissa Lopes; Brazil
57 kg	Silvana Fernandes; Brazil	Elsa Koyama; Mexico	Valéria Morales; Venezuela
65 kg	Ana Carolina Moura; Brazil	Daniela Martinez; Mexico	Constanza Fuentes; Chile
65 kg	Ana Carolina Moura; Brazil	Daniela Martinez; Mexico	Leylianne Ramos; Brazil
+65 kg	Fernanda Vargas; Mexico	Débora Menezes; Brazil	Camila Macedo; Brazil
+65 kg	Fernanda Vargas; Mexico	Débora Menezes; Brazil	Lidia Montes de Oca; Cuba

== See also ==
- Taekwondo at the 2023 Pan American Games
- Taekwondo at the 2024 Summer Paralympics
