= Tamara Leonelli =

Chilean para table tennis player

Personal information
- Full name: Tamara Isabel Leonelli Leonelli
- Nickname: Tami
- Born: 5 June 1997 (age 29) Temuco, Chile

Sport
- Country: Chile
- Sport: Para table tennis
- Disability: Spina bifida
- Disability class: C5
- Coached by: Cristian Carrasco
Medal record
Para table tennis
Representing Chile
Parapan American Games
Gold medal – first place	2019 Lima	Women's singles C5
Gold medal – first place	2023 Santiago	Women's singles C4–5
Silver medal – second place	2023 Santiago	Mixed doubles XD10
Bronze medal – third place	2015 Toronto	Women's singles C5
Para Pan-Am Championships
Gold medal – first place	2017 San Jose	Women's singles C5

Tamara Isabel Leonelli Leonelli (born 5 June 1997) is a Chilean para table tennis player who competes in international level events. She was the first Chilean table tennis player to win gold at the Parapan American Games and is the first Chilean female table tennis player to qualify to compete at the 2020 Summer Paralympics after winning the gold medal in the women's singles at the 2019 Parapan American Games.
