= Juan Garrido Acevedo =

Chilean Paralympic powerlifter

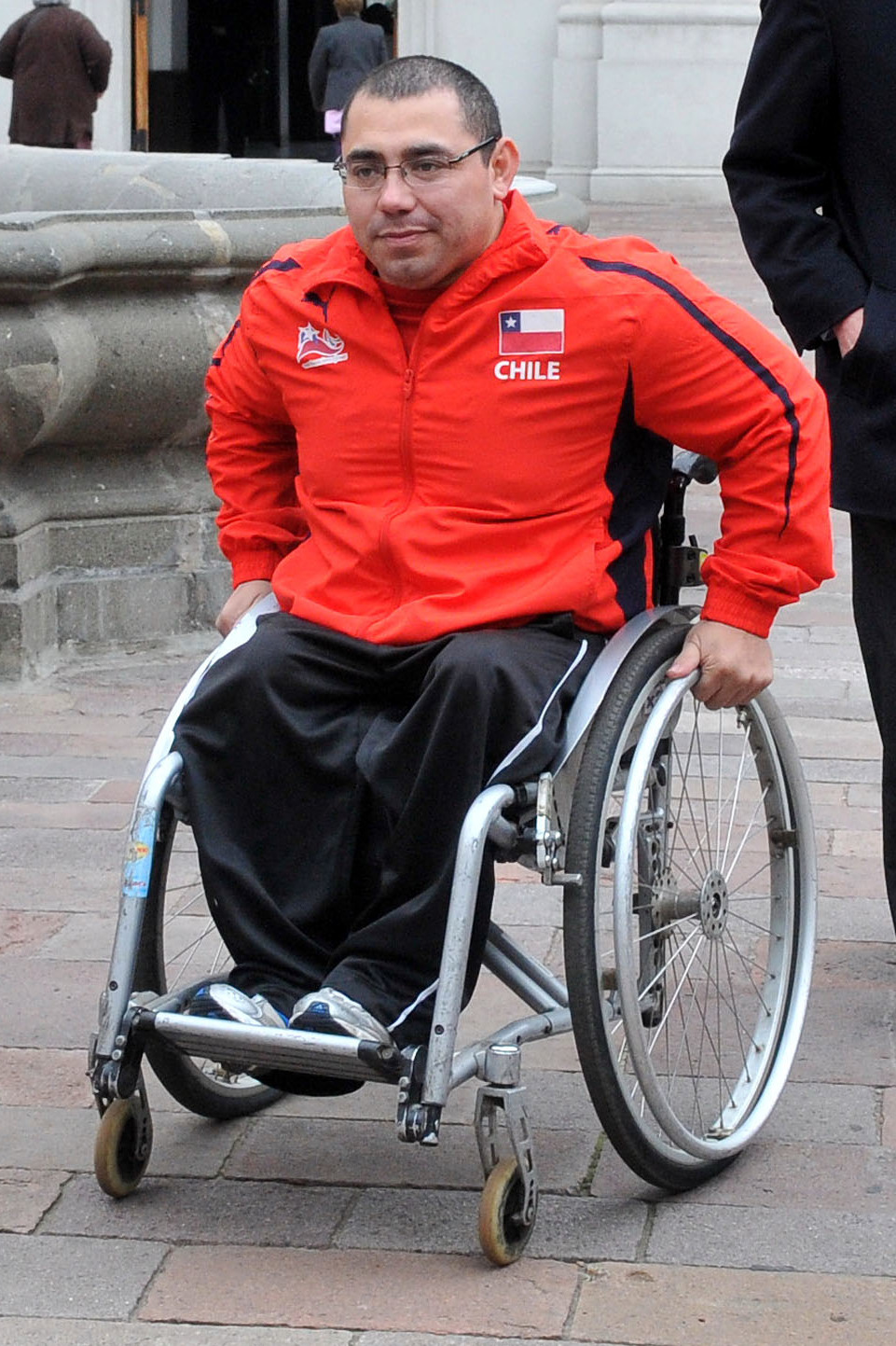
- Garrido Acevedo in 2013

Personal information
- Full name: Juan Carlos Garrido Acevedo
- Born: 4 March 1980 (age 46) Talca, Chile
- Height: 1.40 m (4 ft 7 in)
- Weight: 58 kg (128 lb)

Sport
- Country: Chile
- Sport: Paralympic powerlifting
- Disability: Arthrogryposis
Medal record
Men's paralympic powerlifting
Representing Chile
Parapan American Games
Gold medal – first place	2015 Toronto	59 kg
Gold medal – first place	2019 Lima	59 kg
Gold medal – first place	2023 Santiago	72 kg
Gold medal – first place	2023 Santiago	Mixed Team
Bronze medal – third place	2011 Guadalajara	Middleweight
World Championships
Bronze medal – third place	2019 Nur Sultan	59 kg
Bronze medal – third place	2021 Tbilisi	59 kg
South American Para Games
Gold medal – first place	2026 Valledupar	59 kg
Silver medal – second place	2026 Valledupar	Mixed team
Bronze medal – third place	2026 Valledupar	Team

Juan Carlos Garrido Acevedo (born 4 March 1980) is a Chilean Paralympic powerlifter who competes in international elite events. He is a four-time Parapan American Games gold medalist and a two-time World bronze medalist.
