= Israel Pereira Stroh =

Brazilian para table tennis player

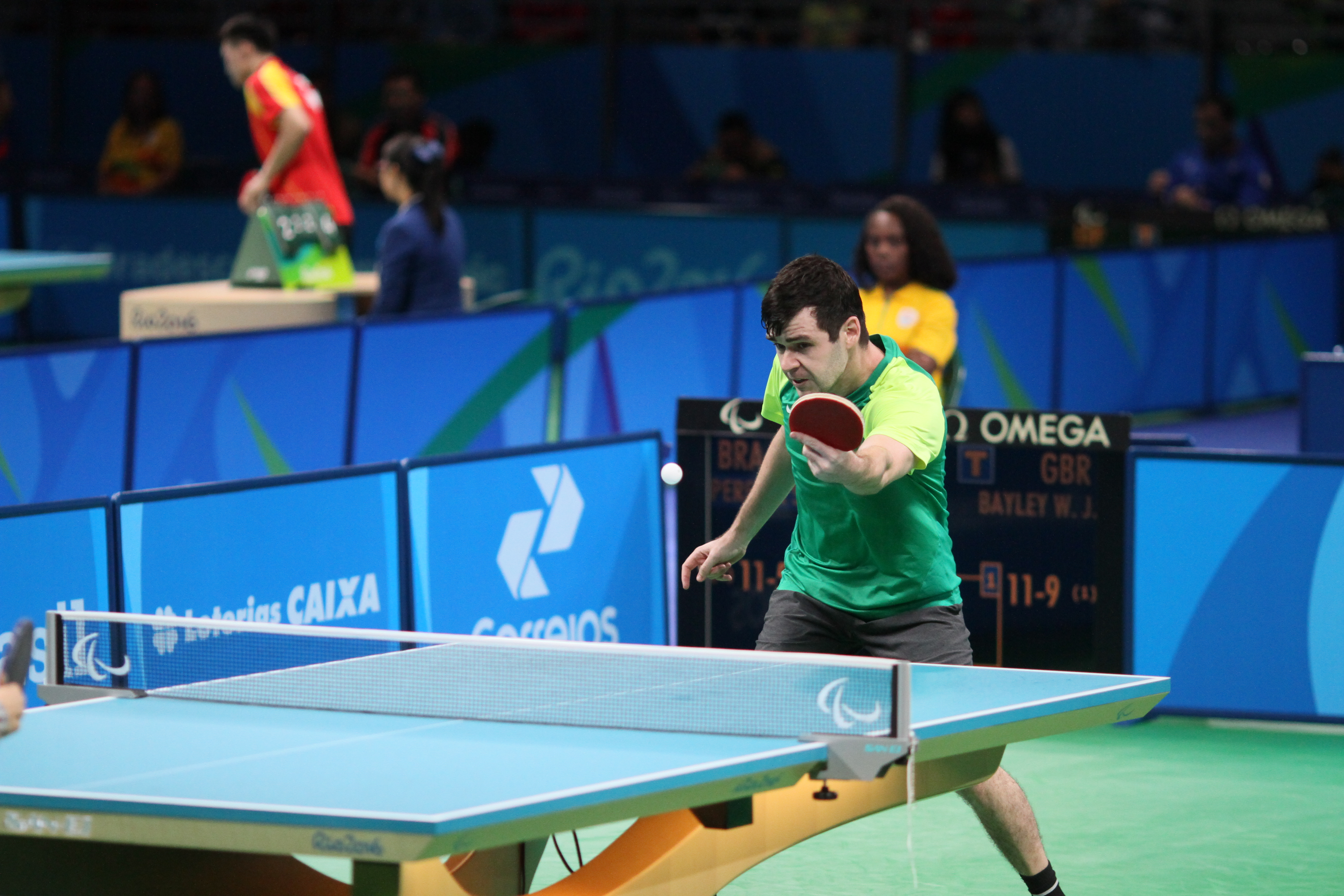
- Stroh at the 2016 Summer Paralympics

Personal information
- Born: 6 September 1986 (age 39) Santos, São Paulo, Brazil

Sport
- Country: Brazil
- Sport: Para table tennis
- Disability: Cerebral palsy
- Disability class: C7
Medal record
Para table tennis
Representing Brazil
Paralympic Games
Silver medal – second place	2016 Rio de Janeiro	Men's singles C7
Parapan American Games
Silver medal – second place	2015 Toronto	Men's singles C7
Pan American Championships
Gold medal – first place	2013 San Jose	Men's singles C8
Silver medal – second place	2013 San Jose	Men's teams C8

Israel Pereira Stroh (born 6 September 1986) is a Brazilian para table tennis player who competes in international elite competitions. He is a Paralympic silver medalist, Pan American champion and a Parapan American Games silver medalist and he was the first Brazilian player to win a medal in a singles event. He used to be a sports journalist who worked for Lance! before he started playing table tennis competitively.
