= Lethícia Rodrigues Lacerda =

Brazilian para table tennis player

Personal information
- Born: 12 September 2002 (age 23) Goiânia, Brazil

Sport
- Sport: Para table tennis
Medal record
Representing Brazil
Parapan American Games
Bronze medal – third place	2019 Lima	Singles C8-10
Bronze medal – third place	2023 Santiago	Singles C8
Bronze medal – third place	2023 Santiago	Doubles C14

Lethícia Rodrigues Lacerda (born 12 September 2002) is a Brazilian para table tennis player who competes in international table tennis competitions. She is a three-time Parapan American Games bronze medalist and has competed at the 2020 Summer Paralympics.

Lacerda is the daughter of Jane Karla Gögel, who is also a table tennis player. Rodrigues and Gögel both competed together at the 2020 Summer Paralympics, they were the second parent-child duo to compete at the Paralympic Games: Greek competitors Lazaros Stefanidis and his son Leontios Stefanidis competed in athletics.
