= Ian Seidenfeld =

American para table tennis player

Personal information
- Born: July 17, 2001 (age 25) Lakeville, Minnesota, U.S.

Sport
- Country: United States
- Sport: Para table tennis
- Disability: Dwarfism
- Disability class: C6
- Coached by: Mitchell Seidenfeld
Medal record
Para table tennis
Representing United States
Paralympic Games
Gold medal – first place	2020 Tokyo	Men's singles C6
Bronze medal – third place	2024 Paris	Men's singles C6
Parapan American Games
Gold medal – first place	2019 Lima	Men's singles C6
Gold medal – first place	2023 Santiago	Men's singles C6

Ian Seidenfeld (born July 17, 2001) is an American para table tennis player. He represented the United States at the 2020 and 2024 Summer Paralympics.

== Career ==
Seidenfeld represented the United States at the 2020 Summer Paralympics in the men's singles C6 event and won a gold medal. He upset reigning Paralympic gold medalist Peter Rosenmeier to win gold. He became the first U.S. para tennis player to win gold since Tahl Leibovitz in 1996.

Seidenfeld represented the United States at the 2023 Parapan American Games and won a gold medal in the men's singles C6 event.

He represented the United States at the 2024 Summer Paralympics and won a bronze meal in the men's singles C6 event.

== Personal life ==
Seidenfeld was born with pseudoachondroplasia. His father and coach, Mitchell Seidenfeld, is a former Para table tennis player and gold medalist. He is Jewish.
