= Florencia Pérez =

Chilean para table tennis player

Personal information
- Born: 14 August 2009 (age 16) Chillán, Chile

Sport
- Country: Chile
- Sport: Para table tennis
- Disability: Spastic hemiplegia
- Disability class: C8
Medal record
Women's para table tennis
Representing Chile
Paralympic Games
Bronze medal – third place	2024 Paris	Women's singles C8
Parapan American Games
Gold medal – first place	2023 Santiago	Women's singles C8
Gold medal – first place	2023 Santiago	Mixed doubles XD14–17

Florencia Pérez (born 14 August 2009) is a Chilean para table tennis player. She competed in the 2024 Summer Paralympics and won a bronze medal in the women's singles C8 event, becoming, at age 15, the youngest Chilean Paralympic medalist.
