= Powerlifting at the 2023 Parapan American Games =

Powerlifting competitions at the 2023 Parapan American Games

- Powerlifting pictogram
- Venue: Chimkowe Gym
- Dates: 18 – 21 November 2023
- No. of events: 17 (9 men, 7 women, 1 mixed)
- Competitors: 98 from 15 nations

Powerlifting competitions at the 2023 Parapan American Games in Santiago, Chile were held between 18 and 21 November 2023 at the Chimkowe Gym in Peñalolén, a suburb of Santiago.

== Participating nations ==
There are 98 powerlifters from 15 nations participating.

- Argentina (4)
- Brazil (20)
- Chile (12) (Host)
- Colombia (13)
- Cuba (6)
- Dominican Republic (3)
- Ecuador (4)
- El Salvador (1)
- Honduras (1)
- Mexico (18)
- Panama (2)
- Peru (1)
- Puerto Rico (1)
- United States (6)
- Venezuela (6)

== Medal summary ==
=== Medal table ===
* Host nation (Chile)

Rank	Nation	Gold	Silver	Bronze	Total
1	Brazil	7	4	6	17
2	Chile*	4	2	1	7
3	Colombia	3	4	2	9
4	Venezuela	1	0	1	2
5	El Salvador	1	0	0	1
5	United States	1	0	0	1
7	Mexico	0	3	2	5
8	Cuba	0	2	2	4
9	Ecuador	0	1	1	2
10	Panama	0	1	0	1
11	Dominican Republic	0	0	1	1
11	Peru	0	0	1	1
Totals (12 entries)		17	17	17	51

=== Medalists ===
==== Men's events ====
Event	Gold	Silver	Bronze
49 kg	Lucas dos Santos; Brazil	Enmanuel González Rodríguez; Cuba	Jhonny Morales; Colombia
54 kg	Bruno Carra; Brazil	Pablo Ramirez Barrientos; Cuba	João Maria França; Brazil
59 kg	Herbert Aceituno; El Salvador	Javier Jiménez; Chile	Niel Garcia Trelles; Peru
65 kg	Jorge Carinao; Chile	Bryan Balanta; Colombia	Carlos Alberto Betancourt; Venezuela
72 kg	Juan Carlos Garrido; Chile	Rey Dimas Vasques; Panama	Ezequiel Correa; Brazil
80 kg	Ailton Bento de Souza; Brazil	Martin Perez Sandoval; Mexico	Jonathan Astudillo; Chile
88 kg	Evânio da Silva; Brazil	Huver Mondragón; Colombia	Oniger Drake Vega; Cuba
97 kg	Fabio Torres; Colombia	José Arimateia; Brazil	Juan Ramirez Miramontes; Mexico
107 kg & +107 kg	Bobby Body; United States	Mateus de Assis; Brazil	José Castillo Castillo; Mexico

==== Women's events ====
Event	Gold	Silver	Bronze
41 kg	Lara Aparecida; Brazil	Kerly Lascano; Ecuador	Cristina Poblador; Colombia
45 kg	Clara Fuentes Monasterio; Venezuela	María José Movilla; Colombia	Leidy Rodriguez; Cuba
50 kg & 55 kg	Camila Campos; Chile	Maria Rizonaide; Brazil	Cristiane Reis; Brazil
61 kg	Ana Lucia Pinto; Colombia	Miriam Aguilar Jimenez; Mexico	Mishelle Oyague; Ecuador
67 kg	Bertha Fernández; Colombia	Amalia Pérez Vázquez; Mexico	Maria de Fátima Castro; Brazil
73 kg & 79 kg	Mariana D'Andrea; Brazil	Caroline Fernandes; Brazil	Josefina Zoraida Miliano; Dominican Republic
86 kg & +86 kg	Tayana Medeiros; Brazil	Marion Serrano; Chile	Edilândia Araújo; Brazil

==== Mixed events ====
Event	Gold	Silver	Bronze
Team	Chile; Jorge Carinao; Juan Carlos Garrido; Camila Campos	Colombia; Eglain Mena; Carlos Yajue; Bertha Fernández	Brazil; Bruno Carra; João Maria França; Mariana D'Andrea

== See also ==
- Weightlifting at the 2023 Pan American Games
- Powerlifting at the 2024 Summer Paralympics
