= Brazil at the 2023 Parapan American Games =

- Flag of Brazil
- IPC code: BRA
- NPC: Brazilian Paralympic Committee

in Santiago, Chile 17 November 2023 – 26 November 2023
- Competitors: 327 in 17 sports
- Flag bearers (opening): Claudiney Batista; Mariana D'Andrea
- Flag bearer (closing): Nathan Torquato
- Officials: 242
- Medals Ranked 1st: Gold 156 Silver 98 Bronze 89 Total 343

Parapan American Games appearances (overview)
- 1999; 2003; 2007; 2011; 2015; 2019; 2023

Brazil is scheduled to compete in the 2023 Parapan American Games in Santiago, Chile from November 17 to November 26, 2023. This was Brazil's seventh appearance at the Parapan American Games, having competed at every edition of the games since the inaugural edition in 1999.

The Brazilian delegation sent to repent the country, was made up of 327 athletes, with Brazilian representation in all sports of these games.

Paralympic medalists in 2020 Summer Paralympics, the parathlete Claudiney Batista and powerlifter Mariana D'Andrea were the country's flagbearers during the opening ceremony. Meanwhile, parataekwondo practitioner Nathan Torquato was the country's flagbearer during the closing ceremony.

Brazil ended its historic participation in the Parapan, the country won 343 medals, with 156 gold, 98 silver and 89 bronze, finishing in first place in the overall medal table and had the best campaign in the history of the Parapan American Games. The country has never achieved as many achievements in this competition as in this one, winning medals in all sports of these games. The performance surpassed that of Lima 2019 record, when the Brazilian delegation when he had 124 golds and 308 medals.

== Medalists ==
The following Brazilian competitors won medals at the games. In the by discipline sections below, medalists' names are bolded.

Medal	Name	Sport	Event	Date
Gold	Lucas dos Santos	Powerlifting	Men's 49 kg	November 18
Gold	Lara Aparecida	Powerlifting	Women's 41 kg	November 18
Gold	Mariana D'Andrea	Powerlifting	Women's 73 & 79 kg	November 18
Gold	Samuel da Silva	Swimming	Men's 50 metre freestyle S5	November 18
Gold	Phelipe Rodrigues	Swimming	Men's 50 metre freestyle S10	November 18
Gold	Wendell Belarmino	Swimming	Men's 50 metre freestyle S11	November 18
Gold	Gabriel Bandeira	Swimming	Men's 200 metre freestyle S14	November 18
Gold	Douglas Matera	Swimming	Men's 100 metre backstroke S12	November 18
Gold	Lucas Lamente	Swimming	Men's 100 metre breaststroke SB9	November 18
Gold	Ana Karolina Soares	Swimming	Women's 200 metre freestyle S14	November 18
Gold	Cecília Jerônimo	Swimming	Women's 400 metre freestyle S8	November 18
Gold	Patrícia Pereira	Swimming	Women's 50 metre breaststroke SB3	November 18
Gold	Alessandra Oliveira	Swimming	Women's 100 metre breaststroke SB4	November 18
Gold	Paulo Salmin	Table tennis	Men's singles C7	November 18
Gold	Luiz Manara	Table tennis	Men's singles C8	November 18
Gold	Cláudio Massad	Table tennis	Men's singles C10	November 18
Gold	Thiago Simões	Table tennis	Men's singles C11	November 18
Gold	Marliane Santos	Table tennis	Women's singles C1–3	November 18
Gold	Danielle Rauen	Table tennis	Women's singles C9–10	November 18
Gold	Bianca Garcia	Cycling	Women's road time trial B	November 19
Gold	Thiego Marques	Judo	Men's 60 kg	November 19
Gold	Harlley Pereira	Judo	Men's 73 kg	November 19
Gold	Rosicleide Silva	Judo	Women's 48 kg	November 19
Gold	Lúcia Teixeira	Judo	Women's 57 kg	November 19
Gold	Bruno Carra	Powerlifting	Men's 54 kg	November 19
Gold	Talisson Glock	Swimming	Men's 100 metre freestyle S6	November 19
Gold	Samuel da Silva	Swimming	Men's 50 metre backstroke S5	November 19
Gold	Gabriel Bandeira	Swimming	Men's 100 metre backstroke S14	November 19
Gold	Wendell Belarmino	Swimming	Men's 100 metre butterfly S11	November 19
Gold	Douglas Matera	Swimming	Men's 100 metre butterfly S12	November 19
Gold	Lucas Lamente	Swimming	Men's 200 metre individual medley SM9	November 19
Gold	Ana Karolina Soares	Swimming	Women's 100 metre backstroke S14	November 19
Gold	Samuel da Silva; Tiago Ferreira; Laila Suzigan; Patrícia Pereira	Swimming	Mixed 4 × 50 metre freestyle relay 20 points	November 19
Gold	Marcelo de Azevedo	Judo	Men's 90 kg	November 20
Gold	Brenda Souza	Judo	Women's 70 kg	November 20
Gold	Ailton Bento de Souza	Powerlifting	Men's 80 kg	November 20
Gold	Evânio da Silva	Powerlifting	Men's 88 kg	November 20
Gold	Tayana Medeiros	Powerlifting	Women's 86 & +86 kg	November 20
Gold	Marcelo Marton	Shooting	R1/R2 Mixed 10 metre air rifle standing SH1	November 20
Gold	Gabriel Araújo	Swimming	Men's 100 metre backstroke S2	November 20
Gold	Gabriel Bandeira	Swimming	Men's 100 metre breaststroke SB14	November 20
Gold	Samuel da Silva	Swimming	Men's 50 metre butterfly S5	November 20
Gold	Gabriel Silva	Swimming	Men's 100 metre butterfly S8	November 20
Gold	Vanilton do Nascimento	Swimming	Men's 100 metre butterfly S9	November 20
Gold	Beatriz Borges	Swimming	Women's 100 metre breaststroke SB14	November 20
Gold	Esthefany de Oliveira	Swimming	Women's 50 metre butterfly S5	November 20
Gold	Vitória Ribeiro	Swimming	Women's 100 metre butterfly S8	November 20
Gold	Roberto Alcalde; Samuel da Silva; Mayara do Amaral; Patrícia Pereira	Swimming	Mixed 4 × 50 metre medley relay 20 points	November 20
Gold	Guilherme Marcião; Iranildo Espíndola	Table tennis	Men's doubles C4	November 20
Gold	Gabriel Antunes; Jean Carlos Mashki	Table tennis	Men's doubles C18	November 20
Gold	Cátia Oliveira; Joyce de Oliveira	Table tennis	Women's doubles C5–10	November 20
Gold	Danielle Rauen; Jennyfer Parinos	Table tennis	Women's doubles C14–20	November 20
Gold	Lucas Arabian; Cátia Oliveira	Table tennis	Mixed doubles C4–7	November 20
Gold	Fábio Silva; Joyce de Oliveira	Table tennis	Mixed doubles C10	November 20
Gold	Gabriel Antunes; Danielle Rauen	Table tennis	Mixed doubles C20	November 20
Gold	Yeltsin Ortega	Athletics	Men's 5000 metres T11	November 21
Gold	Thiago Paulino	Athletics	Men's shot put F57	November 21
Gold	Jerusa Geber	Athletics	Women's 200 metres T11	November 21
Gold	Izabela Campos	Athletics	Women's discus throw F11	November 21
Gold	Alexandre Galgani	Shooting	R4 Mixed 10 metre air rifle standing SH2	November 21
Gold	Gabriel Araújo	Swimming	Men's 200 metre freestyle S2	November 21
Gold	Talisson Glock	Swimming	Men's 400 metre freestyle S6	November 21
Gold	Wendell Belarmino	Swimming	Men's 200 metre individual medley SM11	November 21
Gold	Laila Suzigan	Swimming	Women's 400 metre freestyle S6	November 21
Gold	Carolina Santiago	Swimming	Women's 100 metre breaststroke SB12	November 21
Gold	Esthefany de Oliveira	Swimming	Women's 200 metre individual medley SM5	November 21
Gold	Douglas Matera; Wendell Belarmino; Carolina Santiago; Lucilene da Silva	Swimming	Mixed 4 × 100 metre medley relay 49 points	November 21
Gold	Eugênio Franco	Archery	Men's individual W1	November 22
Gold	Alessandro Silva	Athletics	Men's discus throw F11	November 22
Gold	Caio Vinicius da Silva	Athletics	Men's shot put F12	November 22
Gold	Wallace Santos	Athletics	Men's shot put F55	November 22
Gold	Lorena Spoladore	Athletics	Women's long jump T11/T12	November 22
Gold	Maciel Santos	Boccia	Men's individual BC2	November 22
Gold	Mateus Carvalho	Boccia	Men's individual BC3	November 22
Gold	Andreza de Oliveira	Boccia	Women's individual BC1	November 22
Gold	Evelyn de Oliveira	Boccia	Women's individual BC3	November 22
Gold	Gabriel Araújo	Swimming	Men's 50 metre freestyle S2	November 22
Gold	Douglas Matera	Swimming	Men's 50 metre freestyle S13	November 22
Gold	Douglas Matera	Swimming	Men's 100 metre freestyle S12	November 22
Gold	Andrey Ribeiro	Swimming	Men's 400 metre freestyle S9	November 22
Gold	Wendell Belarmino	Swimming	Men's 100 metre backstroke S11	November 22
Gold	Roberto Alcalde	Swimming	Men's 100 metre breaststroke SB5	November 22
Gold	Phelipe Rodrigues	Swimming	Men's 100 metre butterfly S10	November 22
Gold	Gabriel Bandeira	Swimming	Men's 200 metre individual medley SM14	November 22
Gold	Lídia Vieira	Swimming	Women's 50 metre freestyle S4	November 22
Gold	Laila Suzigan	Swimming	Women's 50 metre freestyle S6	November 22
Gold	Cecília Jerônimo	Swimming	Women's 50 metre freestyle S8	November 22
Gold	Carolina Santiago	Swimming	Women's 50 metre freestyle S13	November 22
Gold	Carolina Santiago	Swimming	Women's 100 metre freestyle S12	November 22
Gold	Laila Suzigan	Swimming	Women's 100 metre breaststroke SB5	November 22
Gold	Ana Karolina Soares	Swimming	Women's 200 metre individual medley SM14	November 22
Gold	Gabriel Silva; Lucas Lamente; Cecília Jerônimo; Mariana Gesteira	Swimming	Mixed 4 × 100 metre medley relay 34 points	November 22
Gold	Fabrício Barros	Athletics	Men's 100 metres T13	November 23
Gold	Ricardo Mendonça	Athletics	Men's 100 metres T37	November 23
Gold	Daniel Mendes	Athletics	Men's 400 metres T11	November 23
Gold	Ariosvaldo Fernandes	Athletics	Men's 400 metres T53	November 23
Gold	Aser Mateus Almeida	Athletics	Men's long jump T36	November 23
Gold	Edenilson Floriani	Athletics	Men's shot put F63	November 23
Gold	Claudiney Batista	Athletics	Men's discus throw F56	November 23
Gold	Sandro Varelo	Athletics	Men's javelin throw F55	November 23
Gold	Jerusa Geber	Athletics	Women's 100 metres T11	November 23
Gold	Rayane Soares	Athletics	Women's 100 metres T13	November 23
Gold	Aline Rocha	Athletics	Women's 800 metres T53/T54	November 23
Gold	Sabrina Custódia	Cycling	Women's individual time trial C1–5	November 23
Gold	Phelipe Rodrigues	Swimming	Men's 100 metre freestyle S10	November 23
Gold	Samuel da Silva	Swimming	Men's 200 metre freestyle S5	November 23
Gold	Douglas Matera	Swimming	Men's 400 metre freestyle S13	November 23
Gold	Gabriel Araújo	Swimming	Men's 50 metre backstroke S2	November 23
Gold	Victor Almeida	Swimming	Men's 100 metre backstroke S9	November 23
Gold	Mariana Gesteira	Swimming	Women's 100 metre backstroke S9	November 23
Gold	Douglas Matera; Matheus Rheine; Carolina Santiago; Lucilene da Silva	Swimming	Mixed 4 × 100 metre freestyle relay 49 points	November 23
Gold	Maria Eduarda Stumpf	Taekwondo	Women's 52 kg	November 23
Gold	Ariosvaldo Fernandes	Athletics	Men's 100 metres T53	November 24
Gold	Samuel Oliveira	Athletics	Men's 400 metres T20	November 24
Gold	Fernanda Yara da Silva	Athletics	Women's 400 metres T47	November 24
Gold	Wanna Helena Brito	Athletics	Women's shot put F32/F33/F34	November 24
Gold	Raíssa Machado	Athletics	Women's javelin throw F56	November 24
Gold	Lauro Chaman	Cycling	Men's individual pursuit C4–5	November 24
Gold	Brazil men's national goalball team: André Botelho; Emerson Ernesto; Josemárcio Sousa; Leomon Moreno; Paulo Ferreira; Romário Marques	Goalball	Men's tournament	November 24
Gold	Vanilton do Nascimento	Swimming	Men's 50 metre freestyle S9	November 24
Gold	Gabriel Araújo	Swimming	Men's 100 metre freestyle S2	November 24
Gold	Samuel da Silva	Swimming	Men's 100 metre freestyle S5	November 24
Gold	Matheus Rheine	Swimming	Men's 400 metre freestyle S11	November 24
Gold	Gabriel Bandeira	Swimming	Men's 100 metre butterfly S14	November 24
Gold	Douglas Matera	Swimming	Men's 200 metre individual medley SM13	November 24
Gold	Mariana Gesteira	Swimming	Women's 100 metre freestyle S9	November 24
Gold	Mayara do Amaral	Swimming	Women's 50 metre butterfly S6	November 24
Gold	Ana Karolina Soares	Swimming	Women's 100 metre butterfly S14	November 24
Gold	Phelipe Rodrigues; Talisson Glock; Cecília Jerônimo; Mariana Gesteira	Swimming	Mixed 4 × 100 metre freestyle relay 34 points	November 24
Gold	Nathan Torquato	Taekwondo	Men's 63 kg	November 24
Gold	Silvana Fernandes	Taekwondo	Women's 57 kg	November 24
Gold	Ana Carolina Moura	Taekwondo	Women's 65 kg	November 24
Gold	Petrúcio Ferreira	Athletics	Men's 100 metres T47	November 25
Gold	Ricardo Mendonça	Athletics	Men's 200 metres T37	November 25
Gold	Júlio Cesar Agripino	Athletics	Men's 1500 metres T11	November 25
Gold	Alessandro Silva	Athletics	Men's shot put F11	November 25
Gold	Cícero Lins	Athletics	Men's javelin throw F57	November 25
Gold	Edenilson Floriani	Athletics	Men's javelin throw F64	November 25
Gold	Thalita Simplício	Athletics	Women's 400 metres T11	November 25
Gold	Rayane Soares	Athletics	Women's 400 metres T13	November 25
Gold	Izabela Campos	Athletics	Women's shot put F12	November 25
Gold	Elizabeth Rodrigues	Athletics	Women's shot put F53/F54/F55	November 25
Gold	Rogério de Oliveira	Badminton	Men's singles SL4	November 25
Gold	Yuki Rodrigues	Badminton	Men's singles SU5	November 25
Gold	Júlio Godoy; Marcelo Conceição	Badminton	Men's doubles WH1–WH2	November 25
Gold	Abinaecia Silva	Badminton	Women's singles SL3	November 25
Gold	Ana Carolina Reis	Badminton	Women's singles SL4	November 25
Gold	Mikaela Almeida	Badminton	Women's singles SU5	November 25
Gold	Iuri Tauan Silva; Maciel Santos; Andreza de Oliveira	Boccia	Mixed team BC1–BC2	November 25
Gold	Brazil national cerebral palsy football team: Ângelo dos Santos; Bruno Ayva; César Batista; Evandro de Oliveira; Heitor Ramires; Jefferson Luiz; Jefferson Miranda; João de Araújo; Leonardo Giovani; Lucas da Silva; Matheus Cardoso; Moacir Silva; Thomasson Pereira; Ubirajara Magalhães	Football 7-a-side	Men's tournament	November 25
Gold	Brazil national blind football team: Cássio Lopes; Jardiel Soares; Jeferson da Conceição; Jonatan da Silva; Luan de Lacerda; Maicon Júnior; Matheus Bum; Raimundo Nonato; Ricardo Alves; Tiago Paraná	Football 5-a-side	Men's tournament	November 25
Gold	Marcelo Conceição	Badminton	Men's singles WH1	November 26
Gold	Daniele Souza	Badminton	Women's singles WH1	November 26
Gold	Rogério de Oliveira; Edwarda Oliveira	Badminton	Mixed doubles SL3–SU5	November 26
Gold	Bianca Garcia	Cycling	Women's road race B	November 26
Gold	Jady Malavazzi	Cycling	Women's road race H2–5	November 26
Silver	Caroline Fernandes	Powerlifting	Women's 73 & 79 kg	November 18
Silver	Tiago Ferreira	Swimming	Men's 50 metre freestyle S5	November 18
Silver	Matheus Rheine	Swimming	Men's 50 metre freestyle S11	November 18
Silver	Ruan Lima	Swimming	Men's 100 metre breaststroke SB9	November 18
Silver	Mariana Gesteira	Swimming	Women's 50 metre freestyle S10	November 18
Silver	Beatriz Borges	Swimming	Women's 200 metre freestyle S14	November 18
Silver	Guilherme Marcião	Table tennis	Men's singles C2	November 18
Silver	Fábio Silva	Table tennis	Men's singles C3	November 18
Silver	Lucas Arabian	Table tennis	Men's singles C5	November 18
Silver	Israel Stroh	Table tennis	Men's singles C7	November 18
Silver	Lucas Carvalho	Table tennis	Men's singles C9	November 18
Silver	Joyce de Oliveira	Table tennis	Women's singles C1–3	November 18
Silver	Sophia Kelmer	Table tennis	Women's singles C8	November 18
Silver	Jennyfer Parinos	Table tennis	Women's singles C9–10	November 18
Silver	Lauro Chaman	Cycling	Men's road time trial C1–5	November 19
Silver	Jady Malavazzi	Cycling	Women's road time trial H1–5	November 19
Silver	Elielton Lira	Judo	Men's 60 kg	November 19
Silver	José Arimateia	Powerlifting	Men's 97 kg	November 19
Silver	Mateus de Assis	Powerlifting	Men's 107 & +107 kg	November 19
Silver	Ruan Lima	Swimming	Men's 200 metre individual medley SM10	November 19
Silver	Cecília Jerônimo	Swimming	Women's 100 metre backstroke S8	November 19
Silver	Arthur Cavalcante	Judo	Men's 90 kg	November 20
Silver	Wilians Silva	Judo	Men's +90 kg	November 20
Silver	Meg Emmerich	Judo	Women's +70 kg	November 20
Silver	Maria Rizonaide	Powerlifting	Women's 50 & 55 kg	November 20
Silver	Alexandre Galgani	Shooting	R5 Mixed 10 metre air rifle prone SH2	November 20
Silver	Tiago Ferreira	Swimming	Men's 50 metre butterfly S5	November 20
Silver	Victor Almeida	Swimming	Men's 100 metre butterfly S9	November 20
Silver	Talisson Glock	Swimming	Men's 200 metre individual medley SM6	November 20
Silver	Débora Borges	Swimming	Women's 100 metre breaststroke SB14	November 20
Silver	Cecília Jerônimo	Swimming	Women's 100 metre butterfly S8	November 20
Silver	Patrícia Pereira	Swimming	Women's 150 metre individual medley SM4	November 20
Silver	Laila Suzigan	Swimming	Women's 200 metre individual medley SM6	November 20
Silver	Fábio Silva; Lucas Arabian	Table tennis	Men's doubles C8	November 20
Silver	Israel Stroh; Paulo Salmin	Table tennis	Men's doubles C14	November 20
Silver	Marliane Santos; Thais Severo	Table tennis	Women's doubles C5–10	November 20
Silver	Eziquiel Babes; Thais Severo	Table tennis	Mixed doubles C4–7	November 20
Silver	Israel Stroh; Jennyfer Parinos	Table tennis	Mixed doubles C14–17	November 20
Silver	Marco Aurélio Borges	Athletics	Men's shot put F57	November 21
Silver	Thalita Simplício	Athletics	Women's 200 metres T11	November 21
Silver	Aline Rocha	Athletics	Women's 400 metres T53/T54	November 21
Silver	Carlos Garletti	Shooting	R6 Mixed 50 metre rifle prone SH1	November 21
Silver	Gabriel Silva	Swimming	Men's 100 metre freestyle S8	November 21
Silver	Mayara do Amaral	Swimming	Women's 400 metre freestyle S6	November 21
Silver	Lídia Vieira	Swimming	Women's 50 metre backstroke S4	November 21
Silver	Marcos Vinicius de Oliveira	Athletics	Men's 400 metres T12	November 22
Silver	Samira da Silva	Athletics	Women's 200 metres T36	November 22
Silver	Fernanda Yara da Silva	Athletics	Women's 200 metres T47	November 22
Silver	Alice de Oliveira	Athletics	Women's long jump T11/T12	November 22
Silver	Poliana Fátima de Sousa	Athletics	Women's javelin throw F54	November 22
Silver	Thomaz Matera	Swimming	Men's 50 metre freestyle S13	November 22
Silver	Patrícia Pereira	Swimming	Women's 50 metre freestyle S4	November 22
Silver	Lucilene da Silva	Swimming	Women's 100 metre freestyle S12	November 22
Silver	Esthefany de Oliveira	Swimming	Women's 100 metre breaststroke SB5	November 22
Silver	Débora Borges	Swimming	Women's 200 metre individual medley SM14	November 22
Silver	Christian Gabriel Luiz	Athletics	Men's 100 metres T37	November 23
Silver	Cristian Ribera	Athletics	Men's 400 metres T54	November 23
Silver	Rodrigo Parreira	Athletics	Men's long jump T36	November 23
Silver	Andrey Pereira	Swimming	Men's 100 metre backstroke S9	November 23
Silver	Lídia Vieira	Swimming	Women's 200 metre freestyle S5	November 23
Silver	Cecília Jerônimo	Swimming	Women's 200 metre individual medley SM8	November 23
Silver	Fabrício Marques	Taekwondo	Men's 58 kg	November 23
Silver	Maria Fernanda Alves; Meirycoll Duval	Wheelchair tennis	Women's doubles	November 23
Silver	Aser Mateus Almeida	Athletics	Men's 100 metres T36	November 24
Silver	Cristian Ribera	Athletics	Men's 100 metres T54	November 24
Silver	Davi Wilker de Souza	Athletics	Men's 400 metres T13	November 24
Silver	Maria Clara Augusto	Athletics	Women's 400 metres T47	November 24
Silver	Aline Rocha	Athletics	Women's 1500 metres T54	November 24
Silver	Ana Cláudia Silva	Athletics	Women's long jump T42–T44/T61–T64	November 24
Silver	Ana Gomes; Daniele Souza	Badminton	Women's doubles WH1–WH2	November 24
Silver	Andrey Ribeiro	Swimming	Men's 50 metre freestyle S9	November 24
Silver	Tiago Ferreira	Swimming	Men's 100 metre freestyle S5	November 24
Silver	Wendell Belarmino	Swimming	Men's 400 metre freestyle S11	November 24
Silver	Lídia Vieira	Swimming	Women's 100 metre freestyle S5	November 24
Silver	Laila Suzigan	Swimming	Women's 50 metre butterfly S6	November 24
Silver	Daniel Rodrigues; Gustavo Carneiro	Wheelchair tennis	Men's doubles	November 24
Silver	Daniel Mendes	Athletics	Men's 100 metres T11	November 25
Silver	Marcos Vinicius de Oliveira	Athletics	Men's 100 metres T12	November 25
Silver	Washington Junior	Athletics	Men's 100 metres T47	November 25
Silver	Christian Gabriel Luiz	Athletics	Men's 200 metres T37	November 25
Silver	Cristian Ribera	Athletics	Men's 1500 metres T54	November 25
Silver	Paulo Henrique Andrade	Athletics	Men's long jump T13	November 25
Silver	Francisco de Lima	Athletics	Men's javelin throw F64	November 25
Silver	Fernanda Yara da Silva	Athletics	Women's 100 metres T47	November 25
Silver	Jenifer Cristian da Silva	Athletics	Women's shot put F12	November 25
Silver	Ariosvaldo Fernandes; Petrúcio Ferreira; Jerusa Geber; Marcelly Vitoria Pedroso	Athletics	Universal 4 × 100 metre relay	November 25
Silver	Edmar Barbosa; Rodolfo Cano	Badminton	Men's doubles WH1–WH2	November 25
Silver	Kauana Beckenkamp	Badminton	Women's singles SL3	November 25
Silver	Edwarda Oliveira	Badminton	Women's singles SL4	November 25
Silver	Lucas Moraes	Taekwondo	Men's +80 kg	November 25
Silver	Débora Menezes	Taekwondo	Women's +65 kg	November 25
Silver	Leandro Pena; Ymanitu Silva	Wheelchair tennis	Quad doubles	November 25
Silver	Rodolfo Cano	Badminton	Men's singles WH1	November 26
Silver	Júlio Godoy	Badminton	Men's singles WH2	November 26
Silver	Vitor Tavares	Badminton	Men's singles SH6	November 26
Silver	Maria Gilda Antunes	Badminton	Women's singles WH2	November 26
Silver	Yuki Rodrigues; Adriane Ávila	Badminton	Mixed doubles SL3–SU5	November 26
Silver	Lauro Chaman	Cycling	Men's road race C4–5	November 26
Bronze	Ezequiel Correa	Powerlifting	Men's 72 kg	November 18
Bronze	Talisson Glock	Swimming	Men's 100 metre backstroke S6	November 18
Bronze	Débora Borges	Swimming	Women's 200 metre freestyle S14	November 18
Bronze	Lídia Vieira	Swimming	Women's 50 metre breaststroke SB3	November 18
Bronze	Susana Schnarndorf	Swimming	Women's 100 metre breaststroke SB4	November 18
Bronze	Iranildo Espíndola	Table tennis	Men's singles C2	November 18
Bronze	Cadu Moraes	Table tennis	Men's singles C5	November 18
Bronze	Jean Carlos Mashki	Table tennis	Men's singles C8	November 18
Bronze	Gabriel Antunes	Table tennis	Men's singles C10	November 18
Bronze	Thais Severo	Table tennis	Women's singles C1–3	November 18
Bronze	Aline Meneses	Table tennis	Women's singles C6–7	November 18
Bronze	Lethicia Lacerda	Table tennis	Women's singles C8	November 18
Bronze	Allana Maschio	Table tennis	Women's singles C9–10	November 18
Bronze	Giulia dos Santos	Judo	Women's 48 kg	November 19
Bronze	João Maria França	Powerlifting	Men's 54 kg	November 19
Bronze	Maria de Fátima Castro	Powerlifting	Women's 67 kg	November 19
Bronze	Débora Campos	Shooting	P2 Women's 10 metre air pistol SH1	November 19
Bronze	Tiago Ferreira	Swimming	Men's 50 metre backstroke S5	November 19
Bronze	José Luiz Perdigão	Swimming	Men's 100 metre butterfly S11	November 19
Bronze	Thomaz Matera	Swimming	Men's 100 metre butterfly S12	November 19
Bronze	Victor Almeida	Swimming	Men's 200 metre individual medley SM9	November 19
Bronze	Phelipe Rodrigues	Swimming	Men's 200 metre individual medley SM10	November 19
Bronze	Sérgio Fernandes	Judo	Men's +90 kg	November 20
Bronze	Rebeca de Souza	Judo	Women's +70 kg	November 20
Bronze	Cristiane Reis	Powerlifting	Women's 50 & 55 kg	November 20
Bronze	Edilândia Araújo	Powerlifting	Women's 86 & +86 kg	November 20
Bronze	Geraldo von Rosenthal	Shooting	P4 Mixed 50 metre pistol SH1	November 20
Bronze	José Luiz Perdigão	Swimming	Men's 100 metre breaststroke SB11	November 20
Bronze	Lídia Vieira	Swimming	Women's 150 metre individual medley SM4	November 20
Bronze	Mayara do Amaral	Swimming	Women's 200 metre individual medley SM6	November 20
Bronze	Cadu Moraes; David Freitas	Table tennis	Men's doubles C8	November 20
Bronze	Cláudio Massad; Luiz Manara	Table tennis	Men's doubles C18	November 20
Bronze	Lethicia Lacerda; Sophia Kelmer	Table tennis	Women's doubles C14–20	November 20
Bronze	Lucas Carvalho; Sophia Kelmer	Table tennis	Mixed doubles C14–17	November 20
Bronze	Fábio Bordignon	Athletics	Men's 200 metres T35	November 21
Bronze	Júlio Cesar Agripino	Athletics	Men's 5000 metres T11	November 21
Bronze	Sivaldo de Souza	Athletics	Men's 5000 metres T13	November 21
Bronze	João Victor Teixeira	Athletics	Men's discus throw F37	November 21
Bronze	Lorraine Gomes	Athletics	Women's 200 metres T12	November 21
Bronze	Vanessa de Souza	Athletics	Women's 400 metres T53/T54	November 21
Bronze	Bruno Carra; João Maria França; Mariana D'Andrea	Powerlifting	Mixed team	November 21
Bronze	José Luiz Perdigão	Swimming	Men's 200 metre individual medley SM11	November 21
Bronze	Edênia Garcia	Swimming	Women's 50 metre backstroke S4	November 21
Bronze	Cristian Ribera	Athletics	Men's 800 metres T53/T54	November 22
Bronze	Sandro Varelo	Athletics	Men's shot put F55	November 22
Bronze	Julyana Cristina da Silva	Athletics	Women's discus throw F57	November 22
Bronze	Elizabeth Rodrigues	Athletics	Women's javelin throw F54	November 22
Bronze	José Carlos Chagas	Boccia	Men's individual BC1	November 22
Bronze	Thomaz Matera	Swimming	Men's 100 metre freestyle S12	November 22
Bronze	Victor Almeida	Swimming	Men's 400 metre freestyle S9	November 22
Bronze	José Luiz Perdigão	Swimming	Men's 100 metre backstroke S11	November 22
Bronze	Mayara do Amaral	Swimming	Women's 50 metre freestyle S6	November 22
Bronze	Lucilene da Silva	Swimming	Women's 50 metre freestyle S13	November 22
Bronze	Beatriz Borges	Swimming	Women's 200 metre individual medley SM14	November 22
Bronze	Fábio Bordignon	Athletics	Men's 100 metres T35	November 23
Bronze	Wallace Santos	Athletics	Men's javelin throw F55	November 23
Bronze	Lorraine Gomes	Athletics	Women's 100 metres T12	November 23
Bronze	Marcelly Vitoria Pedroso	Athletics	Women's 200 metres T37	November 23
Bronze	Vanessa de Souza	Athletics	Women's 800 metres T53/T54	November 23
Bronze	Julyana Cristina da Silva	Athletics	Women's shot put F57	November 23
Bronze	Bianca Garcia	Cycling	Women's individual pursuit B	November 23
Bronze	Thomaz Matera	Swimming	Men's 400 metre freestyle S13	November 23
Bronze	Lucas Lamente	Swimming	Men's 100 metre backstroke S9	November 23
Bronze	Cicero do Nascimento	Taekwondo	Men's 58 kg	November 23
Bronze	Teresinha Correia	Taekwondo	Women's 47 kg	November 23
Bronze	Cristhiane Neves	Taekwondo	Women's 52 kg	November 23
Bronze	Brazil national wheelchair rugby team: Alexandre Giuriato; Alexandre Taniguchi; Bruno Damaceno; Daniel Gonçalves; Davidson Alves; Gabriel Feitosa; Gabriel Simplicio; Gilson Wirzma; Júlio Cezar Braz; Lucas Junqueira; Rafael Hoffmann; Thalys Juca	Wheelchair rugby	Mixed tournament	November 23
Bronze	Sivaldo de Souza	Athletics	Men's 1500 metres T13	November 24
Bronze	Marcelly Vitoria Pedroso	Athletics	Women's 100 metres T37	November 24
Bronze	Vanessa de Souza	Athletics	Women's 1500 metres T54	November 24
Bronze	Leylane de Castro	Athletics	Women's shot put F32/F33/F34	November 24
Bronze	Poliana Fátima de Sousa	Athletics	Women's discus throw F55	November 24
Bronze	Auricélia Evangelista; Maria Gilda Antunes	Badminton	Women's doubles WH1–WH2	November 24
Bronze	Bianca Garcia	Cycling	Women's individual time trial B	November 24
Bronze	Brazil women's national goalball team: Ana Gabriely Brito; Ana Carolina Duarte; Moniza de Lima; Danielle Longhini; Jéssica Vitorino; Kátia Ferreira	Goalball	Women's tournament	November 24
Bronze	Cecília Jerônimo	Swimming	Women's 100 metre freestyle S9	November 24
Bronze	Carlos Geraldo Coelho	Taekwondo	Men's 70 kg	November 24
Bronze	Larissa Lopes	Taekwondo	Women's 57 kg	November 24
Bronze	Leylianne Ramos	Taekwondo	Women's 65 kg	November 24
Bronze	Brazil women's national wheelchair basketball team: Ana Kelvia de Lima; Cleonete Reis; Denise Eusébio; Ivanilde da Silva; Jéssica Santana; Lia Soares; Lucicléia Costa; Maxcileide Ramos; Oara Uchôa; Paola Klokler; Perla Assunção; Vileide Almeida	Wheelchair basketball	Women's tournament	November 24
Bronze	Leandro Pena	Wheelchair tennis	Quad singles	November 24
Bronze	Aline Rocha	Athletics	Women's 100 metres T54	November 25
Bronze	Breno Johann	Badminton	Men's singles SL4	November 25
Bronze	Adriane Ávila	Badminton	Women's singles SL3	November 25
Bronze	Mateus Carvalho; Evelyn de Oliveira	Boccia	Mixed pairs BC3	November 25
Bronze	Claro Lopes	Taekwondo	Men's 80 kg	November 25
Bronze	Pedro Paulo	Taekwondo	Men's +80 kg	November 25
Bronze	Camila Macedo	Taekwondo	Women's +65 kg	November 25
Bronze	Daniel Rodrigues	Wheelchair tennis	Men's singles	November 25

Medals by sport/discipline
Sport	1st place, gold medalist(s)	2nd place, silver medalist(s)	3rd place, bronze medalist(s)	Total
Swimming	67	30	23	**120**
Athletics	34	27	22	**83**
Table tennis	13	13	12	**38**
Badminton	9	9	3	**21**
Powerlifting	7	4	6	**17**
Judo	6	4	3	**13**
Cycling	5	3	2	**10**
Boccia	5	0	2	**7**
Taekwondo	4	3	9	**16**
Shooting	2	2	2	**6**
Goalball	1	0	1	**2**
Archery	1	0	0	**1**
Football 5-a-side	1	0	0	**1**
Football 7-a-side	1	0	0	**1**
Wheelchair tennis	0	3	2	**5**
Wheelchair basketball	0	0	1	**1**
Wheelchair rugby	0	0	1	**1**
**Total**	**156**	**98**	**89**	**343**

Medals by day
Day	1st place, gold medalist(s)	2nd place, silver medalist(s)	3rd place, bronze medalist(s)	Total
18 November	19	14	13	46
19 November	14	7	9	30
20 November	22	17	12	51
21 November	12	7	9	28
22 November	25	10	11	46
23 November	20	8	13	41
24 November	20	13	14	47
25 November	19	16	8	43
26 November	5	6	0	11
**Total**	**156**	**98**	**89**	**343**

Medals by gender
**Gender**	1st place, gold medalist(s)	2nd place, silver medalist(s)	3rd place, bronze medalist(s)	**Total**
Male	85	49	38	172
Female	58	42	45	145
Mixed	13	7	6	26
**Total**	**156**	**98**	**89**	**343**

== Competitors ==
The following is the list of number of competitors (per gender) participating at the games per sport/discipline.

Sport	Men	Women	Total
Archery	3	2	5
Athletics	35	25	60
Badminton	14	18	32
Boccia	6	4	10
Cycling	7	7	14
Football 5-a-side	10	—N/a	10
Football 7-a-side	14	—N/a	14
Goalball	6	6	12
Judo	8	7	15
Powerlifting	10	10	20
Shooting	6	2	8
Swimming	22	17	39
Table tennis	15	11	26
Taekwondo	9	11	20
Wheelchair basketball	12	12	24
Wheelchair rugby	12	0	12
Wheelchair tennis	4	2	6
Total	193	134	327

== Archery ==
Men

Athlete	Event	Ranking Round		Round of 16	Quarterfinals	Semifinals	Final / BM	
Athlete	Event	Score	Seed	Opposition Score	Opposition Score	Opposition Score	Opposition Score	Rank
Eugênio Franco	Individual W1	607	2	—N/a		Saiz (CHI); W 128–123	Tabansky (USA); W 135–123	1st place, gold medalist(s)
Heriberto Roca	Individual recurve open	587	4	Bye	Blas (GUA); W 6–5	Molina (MEX); L 2–6	Bronze medal final Ramirez (COL); L 2–6	4
Andrey de Castro	Individual compound open	668	6	Díaz (CHI); W 135–125	Quesada (CRC); L 153–153	Did not advance		

Women

Athlete	Event	Ranking Round		Round of 16	Quarterfinals	Semifinals	Final / BM	
Athlete	Event	Score	Seed	Opposition Score	Opposition Score	Opposition Score	Opposition Score	Rank
Tércia Figueiredo	Individual recurve open	424	6	—N/a	Campos (PER); L 2–6	Did not advance		
Helena Moraes	Individual compound open	626	7	Candia (CHI); L 118–119	Did not advance			

Mixed

Athlete	Event	Ranking Round		Quarterfinals	Semifinals	Final / BM	
Athlete	Event	Score	Seed	Opposition Score	Opposition Score	Opposition Score	Rank
Heriberto Roca; Tércia Figueiredo	Team recurve open	1011	5	Peru; L 4–5	Did not advance		
Andrey de Castro; Helena Moraes	Team compound open	1294	5	Mexico; W 149–137	United States; L 144–151	Bronze medal final Colombia; L 140–142	4

== Athletics ==
Key

- Note–Ranks given for track events are within the athlete's heat only
- Q = Qualified for the next round
- q = Qualified for the next round as a fastest loser
- N/A = Round not applicable for the event
- Bye = Athlete not required to compete in round

Men

Track events

Athlete	Event	Semifinal		Final	
Athlete	Event	Result	Rank	Result	Rank
Daniel Mendes	100 m T11	11.54	1 Q	11.52	2nd place, silver medalist(s)
Felipe Gomes	100 m T11	DNS		—N/a	
Marcos Vinicius de Oliveira	100 m T12	—N/a		11.38	2nd place, silver medalist(s)
Fabrício Barros	100 m T13	—N/a		10.99	1st place, gold medalist(s)
Paulo Henrique Andrade	100 m T13	—N/a		11.61	5
Fábio Bordignon	100 m T35	12.43	1 Q	12.29	3rd place, bronze medalist(s)
Aser Mateus Almeida	100 m T36	—N/a		12.18	2nd place, silver medalist(s)
Rodrigo Parreira	100 m T36	—N/a		30.04	8
Christian Gabriel Luiz	100 m T37	—N/a		11.49	2nd place, silver medalist(s)
Ricardo Mendonça	100 m T37	—N/a		11.10	1st place, gold medalist(s)
José Alexandre Martins	100 m T47	11.07	2 Q	11.05	5
Petrúcio Ferreira	100 m T47	10.39	1 Q	10.34	1st place, gold medalist(s)
Washington Junior	100 m T47	10.79	1 Q	10.63	2nd place, silver medalist(s)
Ariosvaldo Fernandes	100 m T53	—N/a		14.92	1st place, gold medalist(s)
Cristian Ribera	100 m T54	14.57	1 Q	14.34	2nd place, silver medalist(s)
Matheus de Lima	100 m T64	—N/a		DNS	
Fábio Bordignon	200 m T35	26.08	2 Q	25.87	3rd place, bronze medalist(s)
Christian Gabriel Luiz	200 m T37	—N/a		23.02	2nd place, silver medalist(s)
Ricardo Mendonça	200 m T37	—N/a		22.51	1st place, gold medalist(s)
Matheus de Lima	200 m T64	—N/a		1:09.55	5
Daniel Mendes	400 m T11	53.22	1 Q	52.05	1st place, gold medalist(s)
Felipe Gomes	400 m T11	DNF	3	Did not advance	
Marcos Vinicius de Oliveira	400 m T12	—N/a		51.10	2nd place, silver medalist(s)
Davi Wilker de Souza	400 m T13	—N/a		49.60	2nd place, silver medalist(s)
Daniel Tavares	400 m T20	49.55	4 q	49.58	6
Samuel Oliveira	400 m T20	49.47	1 Q	46.48	1st place, gold medalist(s)
Bartolomeu Chaves	400 m T37	—N/a		1:15.96	6
José Alexandre Martins	400 m T47	—N/a		52.23	5
Ariosvaldo Fernandes	400 m T53	—N/a		51.10	1st place, gold medalist(s)
Cristian Ribera	400 m T54	48.97	1 Q	47.85	2nd place, silver medalist(s)
Cristian Ribera	800 m T53/T54	1:38.59	4 q	1:36.61	3rd place, bronze medalist(s)
Júlio Cesar Agripino	1500 m T11	4:16.64	1 Q	4:04.32	1st place, gold medalist(s)
Yeltsin Ortega	1500 m T11	4:15.72	1 Q	DSQ	
Sivaldo de Souza	1500 m T13	—N/a		4:10.24	3rd place, bronze medalist(s)
Cristian Ribera	1500 m T54	—N/a		3:10.18	2nd place, silver medalist(s)
Júlio Cesar Agripino	5000 m T11	—N/a		15:36.71	3rd place, bronze medalist(s)
Yeltsin Ortega	5000 m T11	—N/a		15:13.10	1st place, gold medalist(s)
Sivaldo de Souza	5000 m T13	—N/a		16:33.60	3rd place, bronze medalist(s)

Field events

Athlete	Event	Final	
Athlete	Event	Distance	Position
Paulo Henrique Andrade	Long jump T13	6.56	2nd place, silver medalist(s)
Paulo Cezar Neto	Long jump T20	6.53	5
Aser Mateus Almeida	Long jump T36	5.64	1st place, gold medalist(s)
Rodrigo Parreira	Long jump T36	5.58	2nd place, silver medalist(s)
Alessandro Silva	Shot put F11	12.78	1st place, gold medalist(s)
Caio Vinicius da Silva	Shot put F12	14.50	1st place, gold medalist(s)
João Victor Teixeira	Shot put F35/F36/F37	12.93	4
Sandro Varelo	Shot put F55	10.10	3rd place, bronze medalist(s)
Wallace Santos	Shot put F55	11.46	1st place, gold medalist(s)
Claudiney Batista	Shot put F57	11.69	5
Marco Aurélio Borges	Shot put F57	13.74	2nd place, silver medalist(s)
Thiago Paulino	Shot put F57	15.17	1st place, gold medalist(s)
Edenilson Floriani	Shot put F63	14.59	1st place, gold medalist(s)
Alessandro Silva	Discus throw F11	44.95	1st place, gold medalist(s)
João Victor Teixeira	Discus throw F37	47.95	3rd place, bronze medalist(s)
Claudiney Batista	Discus throw F56	44.79	1st place, gold medalist(s)
Sandro Varelo	Discus throw F56	27.82	5
Francisco de Lima	Discus throw F64	37.28	4
Sandro Varelo	Javelin throw F55	32.19	1st place, gold medalist(s)
Wallace Santos	Javelin throw F55	26.29	3rd place, bronze medalist(s)
Cícero Lins	Javelin throw F57	49.87	1st place, gold medalist(s)
Claudiney Batista	Javelin throw F57	38.76	5
Edenilson Floriani	Javelin throw F64	60.79	1st place, gold medalist(s)
Francisco de Lima	Javelin throw F64	58.38	2nd place, silver medalist(s)

Women

Track events

Athlete	Event	Semifinal		Final	
Athlete	Event	Result	Rank	Result	Rank
Jerusa Geber	100 m T11	11.84	1 Q	12.06	1st place, gold medalist(s)
Lorena Spoladore	100 m T11	12.52	3	Did not advance	
Thalita Simplício	100 m T11	12.48	2	Did not advance	
Lorraine Gomes	100 m T12	12.67	2 q	12.80	3rd place, bronze medalist(s)
Rayane Soares	100 m T13	—N/a		12.19	1st place, gold medalist(s)
Samira da Silva	100 m T36	—N/a		14.98	4
Marcelly Vitoria Pedroso	100 m T37	—N/a		14.22	3rd place, bronze medalist(s)
Fernanda Yara da Silva	100 m T47	12.75	2 Q	12.49	2nd place, silver medalist(s)
Maria Clara Augusto	100 m T47	12.85	2 Q	12.60	4
Aline Rocha	100 m T54	—N/a		17.58	3rd place, bronze medalist(s)
Vanessa de Souza	100 m T54	—N/a		17.68	4
Jerusa Geber	200 m T11	25.83	1 Q	25.04	1st place, gold medalist(s)
Lorena Spoladore	200 m T11	26.22	2 q	26.42	4
Thalita Simplício	200 m T11	25.77	1 Q	26.05	2nd place, silver medalist(s)
Lorraine Gomes	200 m T12	26.34	2 q	26.75	3rd place, bronze medalist(s)
Samira da Silva	200 m T36	—N/a		30.84	2nd place, silver medalist(s)
Marcelly Vitoria Pedroso	200 m T37	—N/a		29.88	3rd place, bronze medalist(s)
Fernanda Yara da Silva	200 m T47	25.69	1 Q	25.48	2nd place, silver medalist(s)
Maria Clara Augusto	200 m T47	26.25	2 Q	26.06	4
Thalita Simplício	400 m T11	1:04.01	1 Q	58.05	1st place, gold medalist(s)
Lorraine Gomes	400 m T12	1:04.04	1 Q	DNS	
Rayane Soares	400 m T13	—N/a		56.31	1st place, gold medalist(s)
Antônia Keyla da Silva	400 m T20	—N/a		58.68	4
Jardênia Félix	400 m T20	—N/a		1:04.10	6
Fernanda Yara da Silva	400 m T47	57.86	1 Q	56.89	1st place, gold medalist(s)
Maria Clara Augusto	400 m T47	1:00.51	1 Q	59.49	2nd place, silver medalist(s)
Aline Rocha	400 m T53/T54	—N/a		57.52	2nd place, silver medalist(s)
Vanessa de Souza	400 m T53/T54	—N/a		58.71	3rd place, bronze medalist(s)
Aline Rocha	800 m T53/T54	—N/a		1:48.34	1st place, gold medalist(s)
Vanessa de Souza	800 m T53/T54	—N/a		1:55.28	3rd place, bronze medalist(s)
Aline Rocha	1500 m T54	—N/a		3:45.29	2nd place, silver medalist(s)
Vanessa de Souza	1500 m T54	—N/a		3:46.02	3rd place, bronze medalist(s)

Field events

Athlete	Event	Final	
Athlete	Event	Distance	Position
Alice de Oliveira	Long jump T11/T12	4.42	2nd place, silver medalist(s)
Lorena Spoladore	Long jump T11/T12	4.73	1st place, gold medalist(s)
Silvânia Costa	Long jump T11/T12	3.52	4
Maria Clara Augusto	Long jump T47	4.93	4
Ana Cláudia Silva	Long jump T42–T44/T61–T64	3.85	2nd place, silver medalist(s)
Izabela Campos	Shot put F12	9.76	1st place, gold medalist(s)
Jenifer Cristian da Silva	Shot put F12	9.55	2nd place, silver medalist(s)
Leylane de Castro	Shot put F32/F33/F34	4.55	3rd place, bronze medalist(s)
Wanna Helena Brito	Shot put F32/F33/F34	7.36	1st place, gold medalist(s)
Elizabeth Rodrigues	Shot put F53/F54/F55	7.63	1st place, gold medalist(s)
Poliana Fátima de Sousa	Shot put F53/F54/F55	5.59	6
Julyana Cristina da Silva	Shot put F57	9.32	3rd place, bronze medalist(s)
Izabela Campos	Discus throw F11	38.23	1st place, gold medalist(s)
Rafaela de Paula	Discus throw F11	25.87	4
Elizabeth Rodrigues	Discus throw F53	17.80	1
Poliana Fátima de Sousa	Discus throw F55	13.79	3rd place, bronze medalist(s)
Julyana Cristina da Silva	Discus throw F57	26.44	3rd place, bronze medalist(s)
Elizabeth Rodrigues	Javelin throw F54	13.75	3rd place, bronze medalist(s)
Poliana Fátima de Sousa	Javelin throw F54	14.07	2nd place, silver medalist(s)
Raíssa Machado	Javelin throw F56	22.69	1st place, gold medalist(s)

Universal

Track events

Athlete	Event	Semifinal		Final	
Athlete	Event	Result	Rank	Result	Rank
Ariosvaldo Fernandes; Petrúcio Ferreira; Jerusa Geber; Marcelly Vitoria Pedroso	4 × 100 m relay	Bye		48.68	2nd place, silver medalist(s)

== Badminton ==
Men

Athlete	Event	Preliminaries				Quarterfinals	Semifinals	Final / BM	
Athlete	Event	Opposition Result	Opposition Result	Opposition Result	Rank	Opposition Result	Opposition Result	Opposition Result	Rank
Marcelo Conceição	Singles WH1	Vilcachagua (PER); W 21–3, 21–8	Diaz (ARG); W 21–7, 21–4	—N/a	1 Q	Bye	Dominguez (COL); W 21–6, 21–8	Cano (BRA); W 21–8, 21–5	1st place, gold medalist(s)
Rodolfo Cano	Singles WH1	Quevedo (MEX); W 21–6, 21–5	Montero (PER); W 21–14, 21–15	—N/a	1 Q	Bye	Bilenki (CAN); W 21–13, 21–9	Conceição (BRA); L 8–21, 5–21	2nd place, silver medalist(s)
Edmar Barbosa	Singles WH2	Fajardo (PER); L 14–21, 17–21	Aránguiz (CHI); L 2–21, 3–21	Chaves (BRA); L 13–21, 10–21	4	Did not advance			
José Ambrosio Chaves	Singles WH2	Aránguiz (CHI); L 17–21, 7–21	Fajardo (PER); W 21–19, 21–16	Barbosa (BRA); W 21–13, 21–10	2 Q	—N/a	Aránguiz (CHI); L 5–21, 9–21	Bronze medal final Lapointe (CAN); L 8–21, 4–21	4
Júlio Godoy	Singles WH2	Lapointe (CAN); W 21–8, 21–13	Robledo (ARG); W 21–3, 21–4	Zambrano (MEX); W 21–7, 21–6	1 Q	—N/a	Lapointe (CAN); W 21–11, 21–16	Aránguiz (CHI); L 15–21, 11–21	2nd place, silver medalist(s)
Jonathan Cardoso	Singles SL3	Vázquez (MEX); W 21–14, 18–21, 21–16	Roussy (CAN); L 16–21, 8–21	—N/a	2 Q	Mercedes (DOM); W 21–19, 21–13	Roussy (CAN); L 8–21, 17–21	Bronze medal final Vargas (PER); L 10–21, 9–21	4
Breno Johann	Singles SL4	Alcaraz (USA); W 21–10, 21–12	De La Cruz (DOM); W 21–11, 21–13	—N/a	1 Q	—N/a	Ávila (MEX); L 13–21, 13–21	Bronze medal final Lapointe (CAN); W 21–11, 21–19	3rd place, bronze medalist(s)
Eugênio Cleto	Singles SL4	Torres (ARG); W 21–3, 21–2	Lapointe (CAN); L 18–21, 13–21	—N/a	2	Did not advance			
Rogério de Oliveira	Singles SL4	Quinchanegua (COL); W 21–7, 21–5	Camacaro (VEN); W 21–8, 21–4	—N/a	1 Q	—N/a	Lapointe (CAN); W 21–7, 21–7	Ávila (MEX); W 21–12, 21–15	1st place, gold medalist(s)
Eduardo de Oliveira	Singles SU5	Cadenillas (PER); L 17–21, 11–21	Pargas (CUB); L 20–22, 14–21	—N/a	3	Did not advance			
Yuki Rodrigues	Singles SU5	Aranguri (PER); W 21–17, 21–17	Vargas (COL); W 21–5, 21–3	—N/a	1 Q	—N/a	Cadenillas (PER); W 21–18, 22–20	Pargas (CUB); W 21–11, 21–17	1st place, gold medalist(s)
Vinicius Costa	Singles SH6	Quispe (PER); L 14–21, 8–21	Tavares (BRA); L 8–21, 7–21	—N/a	3	Did not advance			
Vitor Tavares	Singles SH6	Costa (BRA); W 21–8, 21–7	Quispe (PER); W 21–8, 21–9	—N/a	1 Q	Bye	Salva (PER); W 21–6, 21–8	Krajewski (USA); L 19–21, 15–21	2nd place, silver medalist(s)
Edmar Barbosa; Rodolfo Cano	Doubles WH1–WH2	Bilenki / Lapointe (CAN); W 21–10, 21–17	Palma / Zambrano (MEX); W 21–15, 21–13	—N/a	1 Q	—N/a	Fajardo / Vilcachagua (PER); W 21–17, 21–17	Godoy / Conceição (BRA); L 2–21, 10–21	2nd place, silver medalist(s)
Júlio Godoy; Marcelo Conceição	Doubles WH1–WH2	Fajardo / Vilcachagua (PER); W 21–9, 21–4	Diaz / Robledo (ARG); W 21–5, 21–5	—N/a	1 Q	—N/a	Bilenki / Lapointe (CAN); W 21–6, 21–8	Barbosa / Cano (BRA); W 21–2, 21–10	1st place, gold medalist(s)

Women

Athlete	Event	Preliminaries				Semifinals	Final / BM	
Athlete	Event	Opposition Result	Opposition Result	Opposition Result	Rank	Opposition Result	Opposition Result	Rank
Ana Gomes	Singles WH1	Burgos (PER); L 13–21, 11–21	Chokyu (CAN); L 20–22, 4–21	Evangelista (BRA); W 21–11, 21–10	3	Did not advance		
Auricélia Evangelista	Singles WH1	Chokyu (CAN); L 7–21, 11–21	Burgos (PER); L 13–21, 20–22	Gomes (BRA); L 11–21, 10–21	4	Did not advance		
Daniele Souza	Singles WH1	Burnett (USA); W 21–9, 21–5	Clarke (BAR); W 21–0, 21–2	—N/a	1 Q	Burnett (USA); W 21–3, 21–5	Burgos (PER); W 21–13, 21–13	1st place, gold medalist(s)
Aline Cabral	Singles WH2	Silva (PER); L 11–21, 10–21	Antunes (BRA); L 14–21, 7–21	—N/a	3	Did not advance		
Maria Gilda Antunes	Singles WH2	Cabral (BRA); W 21–14, 21–7	Silva (PER); W 11–21, 21–18, 21–14	—N/a	1 Q	Silva (PER); W 21–14, 13–21, 21–9	Jáuregui (PER); L 4–21, 2–21	2nd place, silver medalist(s)
Abinaecia Silva	Singles SL3	Beckenkamp (BRA); L 15–21, 21–18, 16–21	Ubaque (COL); W 21–6, 21–0	Dicoudray (DOM); W 21–7, 21–7	2 Q	Ávila (BRA); W 21–15, 7–21, 21–15	Beckenkamp (BRA); W 21–16, 21–15	1st place, gold medalist(s)
Adriane Ávila	Singles SL3	Arequipeño (PER); W 21–13, 21–11	Rojas (MEX); W 21–13, 21–15	Sierra (COL); W 21–4, 21–4	1 Q	Silva (BRA); L 15–21, 21–7, 15–21	Bronze medal final Rojas (MEX); W 21–12, 21–9	3rd place, bronze medalist(s)
Kauana Beckenkamp	Singles SL3	Silva (BRA); W 21–15, 18–21, 21–16	Dicoudray (DOM); W 21–8, 21–8	Ubaque (COL); W 21–6, 21–9	1 Q	Rojas (MEX); W 21–19, 21–16	Silva (BRA); L 16–21, 15–21	2nd place, silver medalist(s)
Ana Carolina Reis	Singles SL4	Ventocilla (PER); W 21–15, 21–14	Carvalho (BRA); W 21–6, 21–2	—N/a	1 Q	Meier (CAN); W 21–10, 21–14	Oliveira (BRA); W 18–21, 21–9, 21–16	1st place, gold medalist(s)
Danielle Carvalho	Singles SL4	Ventocilla (PER); L 3–21, 3–21	Reis (BRA); L 6–21, 2–21	—N/a	3	Did not advance		
Edwarda Oliveira	Singles SL4	Davis (BAR); W 21–7, 21–7	Meier (CAN); W 21–15, 21–19	—N/a	1 Q	Ventocilla (PER); W 21–16, 11–21, 21–11	Reis (BRA); L 21–18, 9–21, 16–21	2nd place, silver medalist(s)
Laura Fernandes	Singles SU5	Rojas (PER); L 9–21, 11–21	Caimanque (CHI); W 21–5, 21–5	Almeida (BRA); L 7–21, 9–21	3	Did not advance		
Maria Brenda Dias	Singles SU5	Llanes (CUB); W 21–17, 21–19	Ari (PER); L 19–21, 21–18, 19–21	Arriagada (CHI); W 21–12, 21–10	2 Q	Rojas (PER); L 10–21, 16–21	Bronze medal final Ari (PER); L 20–22, 21–23	4
Mikaela Almeida	Singles SU5	Caimanque (CHI); W 21–2, 21–7	Rojas (PER); L 21–9, 21–23, 14–21	Fernandes (BRA); W 21–7, 21–9	2 Q	Ari (PER); W 21–3, 21–5	Rojas (PER); W 21–14, 21–17	1st place, gold medalist(s)
Natalia Xavier	Singles SH6	Póveda (PER); L 1–21, 2–21	Velásquez (PER); L 2–21, 7–21	Cloëtta (CAN); L 18–21, 13–21	4	Did not advance		
Renata Reis	Singles SH6	Fernández (PER); L 4–21, 4–21	Loyola (ARG); L 4–21, 3–21	Simon (USA); L 3–21, 4–21	4	Did not advance		
Ana Gomes; Daniele Souza	Doubles WH1–WH2	Evangelista / Antunes (BRA); W 22–20, 21–8	Jáuregui / Burgos (PER); L 14–21, 11–21	Silva / Santos (BRA); W 21–8, 21–9	2	—N/a		2nd place, silver medalist(s)
Auricélia Evangelista; Maria Gilda Antunes	Doubles WH1–WH2	Gomes / Souza (BRA); L 20–22, 8–21	Silva / Santos (BRA); W 21–8, 21–11	Jáuregui / Burgos (PER); L 8–21, 14–21	3	—N/a		3rd place, bronze medalist(s)
Juscileia Silva; Lucivania Santos	Doubles WH1–WH2	Jáuregui / Burgos (PER); L 5–21, 4–21	Evangelista / Antunes (BRA); L 8–21, 11–21	Gomes / Souza (BRA); L 8–21, 9–21	4	—N/a		4

Mixed

Athlete	Event	Preliminaries			Semifinals	Final / BM	
Athlete	Event	Opposition Result	Opposition Result	Rank	Opposition Result	Opposition Result	Rank
Eugênio Cleto; Ana Carolina Reis	Doubles SL3–SU5	Vargas / Sierra (COL); W 21–16, 21–14	Bances / Ventocilla (PER); L 21–19, 17–21, 16–21	2	Did not advance		
Rogério de Oliveira; Edwarda Oliveira	Doubles SL3–SU5	Quinchanegua / Ubaque (COL); W 21–4, 21–5	Vinatea / Rojas (PER); W 21–5, 21–14	1 Q	Ávila / Rojas (MEX); W 21–13, 21–9	Rodrigues / Ávila (BRA); W 21–13, 21–13	1st place, gold medalist(s)
Yuki Rodrigues; Adriane Ávila	Doubles SL3–SU5	Lapointe / Meier (CAN); W 21–14, 21–16	Bello / Llanes (CUB); W 21–6, 21–11	1 Q	Bances / Ventocilla (PER); W 21–16, 21–15	Oliveira / Oliveira (BRA); L 13–21, 13–21	2nd place, silver medalist(s)

== Boccia ==
Men

Athlete	Event	Pool matches				Quarterfinals	Semifinals	Final / BM	
Athlete	Event	Opposition Score	Opposition Score	Opposition Score	Rank	Opposition Score	Opposition Score	Opposition Score	Rank
José Carlos Chagas	Individual BC1	Págua (VEN); W 9–0	Calderón (CHI); W 8–1	Hayward (BER); L 6–6*	2 Q	—N/a	Sanchez (MEX); L 3–4	Bronze medal final Hayward (BER); W 4–3	3rd place, bronze medalist(s)
Iuri Tauan Silva	Individual BC2	Bastías (CHI); W 4–3	Paredes (MEX); L 5–6	—N/a	2 Q	Sayes (ESA); L 4–5	Did not advance		
Maciel Santos	Individual BC2	Sayes (ESA); W 16–0	Aquino (ARG); W 3–2	—N/a	1 Q	Bye	Cristaldo (ARG); W 4–1	Allard (CAN); W 6–1	1st place, gold medalist(s)
Mateus Carvalho	Individual BC3	Rondeau (CAN); W 9–0	Romero (ARG); W 4*–4	Lopez (MEX); W 11–0	1 Q	—N/a	Romero (COL); W 4–1	Romero (ARG); W 5–4	1st place, gold medalist(s)
André Costa	Individual BC4	Dispaltro (CAN); L 2–3	Grisales (COL); L 1–7	Bulacio (ARG); W 10–0	3	Did not advance			
Eliseu dos Santos	Individual BC4	Mora (MEX); W 3*–3	Ciobanu (CAN); W 4–2	—N/a	1 Q	Dispaltro (CAN); L 2–5	Did not advance		

Women

Athlete	Event	Pool matches				Quarterfinals	Semifinals	Final / BM	
Athlete	Event	Opposition Score	Opposition Score	Opposition Score	Rank	Opposition Score	Opposition Score	Opposition Score	Rank
Andreza de Oliveira	Individual BC1	Quiroz (ECU); W 13–1	Flores (ARG); W 5–0	Desilva-Andrade (BER); W 3*–3	1	—N/a			1st place, gold medalist(s)
Evani Calado	Individual BC3	Losley (GUA); W 12–0	Quintriqueo (CHI); W 3*–3	Velez (COL); L 5–5*	2 Q	Callupe (PER); L 3–4	Did not advance		
Evelyn de Oliveira	Individual BC3	Pancca (PER); W 8–1	Chastain (USA); W 14–0	Guérette (CAN); W 8–1	1 Q	Bye	Callupe (PER); W 3*–3	Ferrando (ARG); W 5–4	1st place, gold medalist(s)
Josiane da Silva	Individual BC4	Quispe (PER); L 2–6	Calderón (ARG); W 10–0	—N/a	2 Q	Urrejola (CHI); L 2–6	Did not advance		

Mixed

Athlete	Event	Pool matches				Semifinals	Final / BM	
Athlete	Event	Opposition Score	Opposition Score	Opposition Score	Rank	Opposition Score	Opposition Score	Rank
Iuri Tauan Silva; Maciel Santos; Andreza de Oliveira	Team BC1–BC2	Ecuador; W 17–4	Canada; L 2–11	—N/a	2 Q	Argentina; W 8*–8	Canada; W 8–2	1st place, gold medalist(s)
Mateus Carvalho; Evelyn de Oliveira	Pairs BC3	Guatemala; W 12–0	Canada; W 6–4	Colombia; L 1–5	2 Q	Peru; L 2–3	Bronze medal final Colombia; W 6–2	3rd place, bronze medalist(s)
André Costa; Josiane da Silva	Pairs BC4	Argentina; L 2–3	Canada; W 4–1	—N/a	2 Q	Colombia; L 3–7	Bronze medal final Mexico; L 3–4	4

== Cycling ==
=== Road ===
Men

Athlete	Event	Result	Rank
André Grizante	Time trial C1–5	30:35.57	14
Carlos Alberto Gomes	Time trial C1–5	29:27.21	11
Lauro Chaman	Time trial C1–5	27:06.06	2nd place, silver medalist(s)
Victor Luise de Oliveira	Time trial C1–5	29:31.88	12
Ronan da Motta	Time trial H1–5	36:55.51	10
Ulisses Freitas	Time trial H1–5	32:42.69	5
Carlos Alberto Gomes	Road race C1–3	1:26:11	7
Victor Luise de Oliveira	Road race C1–3	1:26:11	8
André Grizante	Road race C4–5	1:52:12	8
Lauro Chaman	Road race C4–5	1:48:58	2nd place, silver medalist(s)
Ronan da Motta	Road race H3–5	DSQ	
Ulisses Freitas	Road race H3–5	−1 LAP	10

Women

Athlete	Event	Result	Rank
Bianca Garcia	Time trial B	33:14.22	1st place, gold medalist(s)
Amanda de Paiva	Time trial C1–5	17:37.33	11
Sabrina Custódia	Time trial C1–5	17:48.81	12
Victoria de Camargo	Time trial C1–5	18:19.04	14
Jady Malavazzi	Time trial H1–5	17:44.59	2nd place, silver medalist(s)
Josiane Nowacki	Time trial H1–5	19:51.48	5
Mariana Garcia	Time trial H1–5	18:47.04	4
Bianca Garcia	Road race B	2:06:36	1st place, gold medalist(s)
Amanda de Paiva	Road race C1–3	1:19:07	7
Sabrina Custódia	Road race C1–3	1:18:55	6
Victoria de Camargo	Road race C1–3	1:24:42	9
Jady Malavazzi	Road race H2–5	1:32:42	1st place, gold medalist(s)
Josiane Nowacki	Road race H2–5	1:39:29	5
Mariana Garcia	Road race H2–5	1:38:49	4

Mixed

Athlete	Event	Result	Rank
Adriano Matunaga	Time trial T1–2	24:09.07	7
Adriano Matunaga	Road race T1–2	1:10:59	4

=== Track ===
Men

Athlete	Event	Qualification		Final	
Athlete	Event	Time	Rank	Opposition Time	Rank
Carlos Alberto Gomes	Pursuit C1–3	4:16.290	9	Did not advance	
Victor Luise de Oliveira	Pursuit C1–3	4:02.076	5	Did not advance	
André Grizante	Pursuit C4–5	4:57.588	4 FB	Bronze medal final Mátiz (COL); L OVL	4
Lauro Chaman	Pursuit C4–5	4:30.048	1 FG	Villanueva (COL); W 4:30.741	1st place, gold medalist(s)
André Grizante	Time trial C1–5	—N/a		1:12.192	11
Carlos Alberto Gomes	Time trial C1–5	—N/a		1:14.335	13
Lauro Chaman	Time trial C1–5	—N/a		1:06.639	4
Victor Luise de Oliveira	Time trial C1–5	—N/a		1:12.041	10

Women

Athlete	Event	Qualification		Final	
Athlete	Event	Time	Rank	Opposition Time	Rank
Bianca Garcia	Pursuit B	3:56.980	3 FB	Bronze medal final Cruceño (ARG); W 3:58.186	3rd place, bronze medalist(s)
Amanda de Paiva	Pursuit C1–3	4:31.637	6	Did not advance	
Sabrina Custódia	Pursuit C1–3	4:18.878	3 FB	Bronze medal final Caballeros (COL); L 4:22.490	4
Victoria de Camargo	Pursuit C1–3	5:04.046	7	Did not advance	
Bianca Garcia	Time trial B	—N/a		1:17.706	3rd place, bronze medalist(s)
Amanda de Paiva	Time trial C1–5	—N/a		45.708	14
Sabrina Custódia	Time trial C1–5	—N/a		36.864	1st place, gold medalist(s)
Victoria de Camargo	Time trial C1–5	—N/a		42.771	11

== Football 5-a-side ==
Summary

Team	Event	Group stage						Final / BM	
Team	Event	Opposition Score	Opposition Score	Opposition Score	Opposition Score	Opposition Score	Rank	Opposition Score	Rank
Brazil men's	Men's tournament	Mexico; W 1–0	Chile; W 2–0	Colombia; W 1–0	Argentina; L 0–1	Peru; W 5–0	1 FG	Colombia; W 1–0	1st place, gold medalist(s)

Preliminary round

Pos	Team	Pld	W	D	L	GF	GA	GD	Pts	Qualification
1	Brazil	5	4	0	1	9	1	+8	12	Gold medal match
2	Colombia	5	4	0	1	9	1	+8	12	Gold medal match
3	Argentina	5	4	0	1	8	1	+7	12	Bronze medal match
4	Chile	5	1	1	3	2	7	−5	4	Bronze medal match
5	Mexico	5	0	2	3	1	9	−8	2	5th–6th place match
6	Peru	5	0	1	4	1	11	−10	1	5th–6th place match

Source: PASO
November 18
18:00

Mexico	0–1	Brazil
	Report	Nonato 6'

Paralympic Training Center, Santiago
Referee: Luis Oliveros (Colombia)

November 19
16:00

Chile	0–2	Brazil
	Report	Alves 11'; Nonato 0'

Paralympic Training Center, Santiago
Referee: Alfredo Martínez (Mexico)

November 20
16:00

Brazil	1–0	Colombia
Nonato 26'	Report

Paralympic Training Center, Santiago
Referee: Alfredo Martínez (Mexico)

November 22
18:00

Brazil	0–1	Argentina
	Report	Espinillo 2'

Paralympic Training Center, Santiago
Referee: Alfredo Martínez (Mexico)

November 23
18:00

Peru	0–5	Brazil
	Report	Alves 6', 9', 11'; Paraná 10'; Santos 27'

Paralympic Training Center, Santiago
Referee: Luis Oliveros (Colombia)

Gold medal match

November 25
20:00

Brazil	1–0	Colombia
Alves	Report

Paralympic Training Center, Santiago
Referee: Alfredo Martínez (Mexico)

== Football 7-a-side ==
Summary

Team	Event	Group stage						Final / BM	
Team	Event	Opposition Score	Opposition Score	Opposition Score	Opposition Score	Opposition Score	Rank	Opposition Score	Rank
Brazil men's	Men's tournament	Argentina; W 2–1	Canada; W 11–1	United States; W 2–0	Chile; W 4–0	Venezuela; W 5–0	1 FG	Argentina; W 1–0 (a.e.t.)	1st place, gold medalist(s)

Preliminary round

18 November
17:00

Brazil	2 – 1	Argentina
Cardoso de Souza 4'; Magalhães 18'		Fernandez 9'

Estadio Bicentenario de La Florida, Santiago

19 November
19:30

Brazil	11 – 1	Canada
de Oliveira 9', 24', 31'; Cardoso de Souza 10', 20', 39' da Silva 25', 50', 57'; Magalhães 28'; Pereira 32'		Del Cul 18'

Estadio Bicentenario de La Florida, Santiago

20 November
19:30

United States	0 – 2	Brazil
		Batista de Aguiar 30+1'; Cardoso de Souza 33'

Estadio Bicentenario de La Florida, Santiago

21 November
17:00

Chile	0 – 4	Brazil
		Batista de Aguiar 16'; Giovani 29', 35' da Silva 60+3'

Estadio Bicentenario de La Florida, Santiago

23 November
14:30

Venezuela	0 – 5	Brazil
		Miranda 7', 44' dos Santos 25'; Pereira 60', 60+4'

Estadio Bicentenario de La Florida, Santiago

Gold medal match

25 November
19:30

Brazil	1 – 0 (a.e.t)	Argentina
Batista de Aguiar 72'

Estadio Bicentenario de La Florida, Santiago

== Goalball ==
Summary

Team	Event	Group stage				Quarterfinal	Semifinal	Final / BM	
Team	Event	Opposition Score	Opposition Score	Opposition Score	Rank	Opposition Score	Opposition Score	Opposition Score	Rank
Brazil men's	Men's tournament	Colombia; W 11–1	Mexico; W 12–2	Chile; W 10–0	1 Q	Venezuela; W 10–0	Argentina; W 8–2	United States; W 12–2	1st place, gold medalist(s)
Brazil women's	Women's tournament	Argentina; W 12–2	Guatemala; W 11–1	Mexico; W 4–0	1 Q	Peru; W 12–5	Canada; L 2–4	Bronze medal match Argentina; W 10–0	3rd place, bronze medalist(s)

== Judo ==
Men

Athlete	Event	Round of 16	Quarterfinals	Semifinals	Repechage 1	Repechage 2	Final / BM	
Athlete	Event	Opposition Result	Opposition Result	Opposition Result	Opposition Result	Opposition Result	Opposition Result	Rank
Elielton Lira	−60 kg	Bye	Gómez (ARG); W 10–00	González (CUB); W 10–00	Bye		Marques (BRA); L 00–11	2nd place, silver medalist(s)
Thiego Marques	−60 kg	Bye	Hawthorne (USA); W 10S1–00S1	Borges (URU); W 10S2–00	Bye		Lira (BRA); W 11–00	1st place, gold medalist(s)
Harlley Pereira	−73 kg	Bye	Ferraro (USA); W 11–00	Romero (CUB); W 11S1–00	Bye		Gauto (ARG); W 10–00	1st place, gold medalist(s)
Rayfran Mesquita	−73 kg	Bye	García (CUB); L 00–10	Did not advance	Llanos (CHI); W 10–01	Ortiz (MEX); W 10–00	Bronze medal final Romero (CUB); L 00–10S1	=5
Arthur Cavalcante	−90 kg	—N/a	Bye	Ties (USA); W 10–00S1	—N/a	Bye	Azevedo (BRA); L 00–01S1	2nd place, silver medalist(s)
Marcelo de Azevedo	−90 kg	—N/a	Espinoza (VEN); W 10–00	Goodrich (USA); W 01–00S1	—N/a	Bye	Cavalcante (BRA); W 01S1–00	1st place, gold medalist(s)
Sérgio Fernandes	+90 kg	—N/a	Parra (CHI); W 10S1–00	Fernández (CUB); L 00–10	—N/a		Bronze medal final Aguirre (MEX); W 10–00	3rd place, bronze medalist(s)
Wilians Silva	+90 kg	—N/a	Bye	Alderete (ARG); W 10–00	—N/a		Fernández (CUB); L 00–10	2nd place, silver medalist(s)

Women

Athlete	Event	Group round				Round of 16	Quarterfinals	Semifinals	Repechage	Final / BM	
Athlete	Event	Opposition Result	Opposition Result	Opposition Result	Rank	Opposition Result	Opposition Result	Opposition Result	Opposition Result	Opposition Result	Rank
Giulia dos Santos	−48 kg	Silva (BRA); L 00S1–10S2	Ledesma (ARG); L 01–10S2	Yáñez (CHI); W 10–00	3	—N/a					3rd place, bronze medalist(s)
Rosicleide Silva	−48 kg	Santos (BRA); W 10S2–00S1	Yáñez (CHI); W 10–00	Ledesma (ARG); W 10S1–00	1	—N/a					1st place, gold medalist(s)
Larissa Oliveira	−57 kg	—N/a				Bye	Mutia (USA); L 00S1–10	Did not advance	Mowatt (CAN); W 10–00	Bronze medal final Gómez (ARG); L 01–10	=5
Lúcia Teixeira	−57 kg	—N/a				Bye	Lamadrid (COL); W 01–00	Gómez (ARG); W 10–00	Bye	Mutia (USA); W 10–00S2	1st place, gold medalist(s)
Brenda Souza	−70 kg	Almanza (CHI); W 10–00	Hechevarría (CUB); W 10–00	Boggiano (ARG); W 10S1–00S2	1	—N/a					1st place, gold medalist(s)
Meg Emmerich	+70 kg	—N/a					Sanabria (VEN); W 10–00	Mederos (URU); W 10–00S1	Bye	Hernández (CUB); L 00S2–10	2nd place, silver medalist(s)
Rebeca de Souza	+70 kg	—N/a					Bye	Hernández (CUB); L 01–10	Bye	Bronze medal final Sanabria (VEN); W 10–00	3rd place, bronze medalist(s)

== Powerlifting ==
Men

Athlete	Event	Total lifted	Rank
Lucas dos Santos	–49 kg	150	1st place, gold medalist(s)
Bruno Carra	–54 kg	161	1st place, gold medalist(s)
João Maria França	–54 kg	160	3rd place, bronze medalist(s)
Ezequiel Correa	–72 kg	186	3rd place, bronze medalist(s)
Ailton Bento de Souza	–80 kg	183	1st place, gold medalist(s)
André Luiz Paz	–88 kg	187	4
Evânio da Silva	–88 kg	197	1st place, gold medalist(s)
José Arimateia	–97 kg	200	2nd place, silver medalist(s)
Gustavo Souza	–107 kg & +107 kg	NM	
Mateus de Assis	–107 kg & +107 kg	126.9	2nd place, silver medalist(s)

Women

Athlete	Event	Total lifted	Rank
Lara Aparecida	–41 kg	103	1st place, gold medalist(s)
Cristiane Reis	–50 kg & –55 kg	86.8	3rd place, bronze medalist(s)
Maria Luzineide Santos	–50 kg & –55 kg	NM	
Maria Rizonaide	–50 kg & –55 kg	89.7	2nd place, silver medalist(s)
Maria de Fátima Castro	–67 kg	110	3rd place, bronze medalist(s)
Ângela Teixeira	–73 kg & –79 kg	87.2	5
Caroline Fernandes	–73 kg & –79 kg	94.7	2nd place, silver medalist(s)
Mariana D'Andrea	–73 kg & –79 kg	116.3	1st place, gold medalist(s)
Edilândia Araújo	–86 kg & +86 kg	100.7	3rd place, bronze medalist(s)
Tayana Medeiros	–86 kg & +86 kg	104.4	1st place, gold medalist(s)

Mixed

Athlete	Event	Qualification		Semifinal	Final / BM	
Athlete	Event	Result	Rank	Opposition Result	Opposition Result	Rank
Bruno Carra; João Maria França; Mariana D'Andrea	Team	352.8	1 Q	Chile; L 368.4–369.6	Bronze medal final Cuba; W 352.8–336.4	3rd place, bronze medalist(s)

== Shooting ==
Men

Athlete	Event	Qualification		Final	
Athlete	Event	Score	Rank	Score	Rank
Geraldo von Rosenthal	P1 – 10 m air pistol SH1	540	9	Did not advance	
Sergio Vida	P1 – 10 m air pistol SH1	Did not start		—N/a	

Women

Athlete	Event	Qualification		Final	
Athlete	Event	Score	Rank	Score	Rank
Débora Campos	P2 – 10 m air pistol SH1	523	4 Q	201.8	3rd place, bronze medalist(s)

Mixed

Athlete	Event	Qualification		Final	
Athlete	Event	Score	Rank	Score	Rank
Débora Campos	P3 – 25 m pistol SH1	535	5 Q	9	5
Geraldo von Rosenthal	P3 – 25 m pistol SH1	556	3 Q	13	4
Sergio Vida	P3 – 25 m pistol SH1	Did not start		—N/a	
Geraldo von Rosenthal	P4 – 50 m pistol SH1	505	6 Q	185.9	3rd place, bronze medalist(s)
Sergio Vida	P4 – 50 m pistol SH1	Did not start		—N/a	
Marcelo Marton	R1/R2 – 10 m air rifle standing SH1	608.4	2 Q	240.9	1st place, gold medalist(s)
Carlos Garletti	R3 – 10 m air rifle prone SH1	625.5	5 Q	144.5	7
Marcelo Marton	R3 – 10 m air rifle prone SH1	623.7	6 Q	120.5	8
Alexandre Galgani	R4 – 10 m air rifle standing SH2	626.4	2 Q	252.3	1st place, gold medalist(s)
Bruno Kiefer	R4 – 10 m air rifle standing SH2	628.6	1 Q	163.2	6
Jessica Michalack	R4 – 10 m air rifle standing SH2	616.2	7 Q	142.7	7
Alexandre Galgani	R5 – 10 m air rifle prone SH2	636.3	1 Q	253.2	2nd place, silver medalist(s)
Bruno Kiefer	R5 – 10 m air rifle prone SH2	631.9	4 Q	145.0	7
Jessica Michalack	R5 – 10 m air rifle prone SH2	630.0	7 Q	209.4	4
Carlos Garletti	R6 – 50 m rifle prone SH1	610.7	6 Q	238.4	2nd place, silver medalist(s)

== Swimming ==
Men

Athlete	Event	Heat		Final	
Athlete	Event	Time	Rank	Time	Rank
Gabriel Araújo	50 m freestyle S2	—N/a		52.09	1st place, gold medalist(s)
Alan Basílio	50 m freestyle S5	38.76	6 Q	38.22	=6
Samuel da Silva	50 m freestyle S5	31.97	1 Q	31.40	1st place, gold medalist(s)
Tiago Ferreira	50 m freestyle S5	34.69	2 Q	34.46	2nd place, silver medalist(s)
Andrey Ribeiro	50 m freestyle S9	27.42	2 Q	27.32	2nd place, silver medalist(s)
Gabriel Silva	50 m freestyle S9	27.85	3 Q	27.60	4
Vanilton do Nascimento	50 m freestyle S9	27.06	1 Q	26.76	1st place, gold medalist(s)
Phelipe Rodrigues	50 m freestyle S10	—N/a		23.93	1st place, gold medalist(s)
Ruan Lima	50 m freestyle S10	—N/a		26.46	6
José Luiz Perdigão	50 m freestyle S11	—N/a		28.40	4
Matheus Rheine	50 m freestyle S11	—N/a		27.19	2nd place, silver medalist(s)
Wendell Belarmino	50 m freestyle S11	—N/a		26.64	1st place, gold medalist(s)
Douglas Matera	50 m freestyle S13	—N/a		25.56	1st place, gold medalist(s)
Thomaz Matera	50 m freestyle S13	—N/a		26.06	2nd place, silver medalist(s)
Gabriel Araújo	100 m freestyle S2	—N/a		1:56.61	1st place, gold medalist(s)
Alan Basílio	100 m freestyle S5	1:27.59	7 Q	1:26.51	7
Samuel da Silva	100 m freestyle S5	1:20.73	1 Q	1:15.14	1st place, gold medalist(s)
Tiago Ferreira	100 m freestyle S5	1:23.38	4 Q	1:21.25	2nd place, silver medalist(s)
Talisson Glock	100 m freestyle S6	—N/a		1:05.66	1st place, gold medalist(s)
Gabriel Silva	100 m freestyle S8	—N/a		1:01.30	2nd place, silver medalist(s)
Phelipe Rodrigues	100 m freestyle S10	—N/a		53.18	1st place, gold medalist(s)
Ruan Lima	100 m freestyle S10	—N/a		57.25	5
Vanilton do Nascimento	100 m freestyle S10	—N/a		59.26	7
Douglas Matera	100 m freestyle S12	58.83	1 Q	56.45	1st place, gold medalist(s)
Matheus Rheine	100 m freestyle S12	1:00.79	3 Q	59.35	4
Thomaz Matera	100 m freestyle S12	1:02.53	6 Q	58.88	3rd place, bronze medalist(s)
Gabriel Araújo	200 m freestyle S2	—N/a		4:05.05	1st place, gold medalist(s)
Samuel da Silva	200 m freestyle S5	3:08.74	5 Q	2:53.73	1st place, gold medalist(s)
Tiago Ferreira	200 m freestyle S5	3:12.09	7 Q	3:05.91	6
Gabriel Bandeira	200 m freestyle S14	1:58.47	1 Q	1:56.30	1st place, gold medalist(s)
Talisson Glock	400 m freestyle S6	—N/a		5:05.67	1st place, gold medalist(s)
Andrey Ribeiro	400 m freestyle S9	4:25.93	1 Q	4:25.08	1st place, gold medalist(s)
Vanilton do Nascimento	400 m freestyle S9	Did not start		—N/a	
Victor Almeida	400 m freestyle S9	4:53.03	5 Q	4:37.74	3rd place, bronze medalist(s)
Matheus Rheine	400 m freestyle S11	—N/a		4:58.49	1st place, gold medalist(s)
Wendell Belarmino	400 m freestyle S11	—N/a		5:05.18	2nd place, silver medalist(s)
Douglas Matera	400 m freestyle S13	—N/a		4:36.66	1st place, gold medalist(s)
Thomaz Matera	400 m freestyle S13	—N/a		4:45.20	3rd place, bronze medalist(s)
Gabriel Araújo	50 m backstroke S2	—N/a		56.70	1st place, gold medalist(s)
José Ronaldo da Silva	50 m backstroke S2	—N/a		1:19.19	6
Samuel da Silva	50 m backstroke S5	—N/a		34.96	1st place, gold medalist(s)
Tiago Ferreira	50 m backstroke S5	—N/a		41.49	3rd place, bronze medalist(s)
Gabriel Araújo	100 m backstroke S2	—N/a		2:00.02	1st place, gold medalist(s)
José Ronaldo da Silva	100 m backstroke S2	—N/a		3:13.06	6
Talisson Glock	100 m backstroke S6	—N/a		1:19.81	3rd place, bronze medalist(s)
Andrey Pereira	100 m backstroke S9	1:06.60	2 Q	1:06.38	2nd place, silver medalist(s)
Lucas Lamente	100 m backstroke S9	1:07.59	3 Q	1:06.78	3rd place, bronze medalist(s)
Victor Almeida	100 m backstroke S9	1:06.15	1 Q	1:04.50	1st place, gold medalist(s)
Phelipe Rodrigues	100 m backstroke S10	—N/a		1:08.38	5
Ruan Lima	100 m backstroke S10	—N/a		1:07.52	4
José Luiz Perdigão	100 m backstroke S11	—N/a		1:18.47	3rd place, bronze medalist(s)
Wendell Belarmino	100 m backstroke S11	—N/a		1:13.64	1st place, gold medalist(s)
Douglas Matera	100 m backstroke S12	—N/a		1:05.79	1st place, gold medalist(s)
Thomaz Matera	100 m backstroke S12	—N/a		1:10.23	4
Gabriel Bandeira	100 m backstroke S14	1:03.29	1 Q	58.79	1st place, gold medalist(s)
Gabriel Araújo	50 m breaststroke SB2	—N/a		1:19.07	4
Roberto Alcalde	100 m breaststroke SB5	—N/a		1:37.11	1st place, gold medalist(s)
Andrey Ribeiro	100 m breaststroke SB8	DSQ		Did not advance	
Lucas Lamente	100 m breaststroke SB9	1:12.33	1 Q	1:11.98	1st place, gold medalist(s)
Ruan Lima	100 m breaststroke SB9	1:12.88	2 Q	1:12.53	2nd place, silver medalist(s)
Victor Almeida	100 m breaststroke SB9	1:23.79	8 Q	1:22.18	7
José Luiz Perdigão	100 m breaststroke SB11	—N/a		1:23.54	3rd place, bronze medalist(s)
Wendell Belarmino	100 m breaststroke SB11	—N/a		1:23.99	4
Thomaz Matera	100 m breaststroke SB12	—N/a		1:29.96	5
Gabriel Bandeira	100 m breaststroke SB14	—N/a		1:07.42	1st place, gold medalist(s)
Samuel da Silva	50 m butterfly S5	—N/a		31.50	1st place, gold medalist(s)
Tiago Ferreira	50 m butterfly S5	—N/a		36.70	2nd place, silver medalist(s)
Talisson Glock	50 m butterfly S6	DSQ		Did not advance	
Gabriel Silva	100 m butterfly S8	—N/a		1:05.93	1st place, gold medalist(s)
Andrey Ribeiro	100 m butterfly S9	1:06.09	3 Q	1:05.46	4
Vanilton do Nascimento	100 m butterfly S9	1:05.85	2 Q	1:03.50	1st place, gold medalist(s)
Victor Almeida	100 m butterfly S9	1:07.61	5 Q	1:04.53	2nd place, silver medalist(s)
Phelipe Rodrigues	100 m butterfly S10	—N/a		1:00.47	1st place, gold medalist(s)
José Luiz Perdigão	100 m butterfly S11	—N/a		1:11.35	3rd place, bronze medalist(s)
Wendell Belarmino	100 m butterfly S11	—N/a		1:06.96	1st place, gold medalist(s)
Douglas Matera	100 m butterfly S12	—N/a		59.98	1st place, gold medalist(s)
Thomaz Matera	100 m butterfly S12	—N/a		1:04.69	3rd place, bronze medalist(s)
Gabriel Bandeira	100 m butterfly S14	—N/a		54.63	1st place, gold medalist(s)
Roberto Alcalde	200 m individual medley SM6	3:14.19	7 Q	3:18.10	7
Talisson Glock	200 m individual medley SM6	2:57.99	5 Q	2:43.49	2nd place, silver medalist(s)
Gabriel Silva	200 m individual medley SM8	—N/a		DSQ	
Andrey Ribeiro	200 m individual medley SM9	2:38.52	7 Q	2:34.50	6
Lucas Lamente	200 m individual medley SM9	2:34.43	4 Q	2:23.74	1st place, gold medalist(s)
Victor Almeida	200 m individual medley SM9	2:29.14	2 Q	2:27.93	3rd place, bronze medalist(s)
Phelipe Rodrigues	200 m individual medley SM10	—N/a		2:23.84	3rd place, bronze medalist(s)
Ruan Lima	200 m individual medley SM10	—N/a		2:23.65	2nd place, silver medalist(s)
José Luiz Perdigão	200 m individual medley SM11	—N/a		2:40.95	3rd place, bronze medalist(s)
Wendell Belarmino	200 m individual medley SM11	—N/a		2:34.68	1st place, gold medalist(s)
Douglas Matera	200 m individual medley SM13	—N/a		2:24.19	1st place, gold medalist(s)
Gabriel Bandeira	200 m individual medley SM14	2:20.33	2 Q	2:10.59	1st place, gold medalist(s)

Women

Athlete	Event	Heat		Final	
Athlete	Event	Time	Rank	Time	Rank
Edênia Garcia	50 m freestyle S4	1:28.21	8 Q	1:03.93	7
Lídia Vieira	50 m freestyle S4	40.56	1 Q	39.72	1st place, gold medalist(s)
Patrícia Pereira	50 m freestyle S4	42.18	2 Q	40.91	2nd place, silver medalist(s)
Susana Schnarndorf	50 m freestyle S4	56.17	5 Q	54.55	5
Laila Suzigan	50 m freestyle S6	—N/a		35.30	1st place, gold medalist(s)
Mayara do Amaral	50 m freestyle S6	—N/a		35.66	3rd place, bronze medalist(s)
Cecília Jerônimo	50 m freestyle S8	31.81	1 Q	31.35	1st place, gold medalist(s)
Vitória Ribeiro	50 m freestyle S8	33.91	3 Q	33.49	4
Mariana Gesteira	50 m freestyle S10	—N/a		28.29	2nd place, silver medalist(s)
Carolina Santiago	50 m freestyle S13	—N/a		27.18	1st place, gold medalist(s)
Lucilene da Silva	50 m freestyle S13	—N/a		28.62	3rd place, bronze medalist(s)
Raquel Viel	50 m freestyle S13	—N/a		32.18	4
Esthefany de Oliveira	100 m freestyle S5	1:37.71	6 Q	1:35.11	6
Lídia Vieira	100 m freestyle S5	1:28.28	2 Q	1:26.69	2nd place, silver medalist(s)
Patrícia Pereira	100 m freestyle S5	1:36.59	5 Q	1:32.69	5
Susana Schnarndorf	100 m freestyle S5	1:55.53	10	Did not advance	
Laila Suzigan	100 m freestyle S7	1:19.03	4 Q	1:16.96	4
Mayara do Amaral	100 m freestyle S7	1:23.91	6 Q	1:21.31	6
Cecília Jerônimo	100 m freestyle S9	1:09.29	4 Q	1:08.33	3rd place, bronze medalist(s)
Mariana Gesteira	100 m freestyle S9	1:04.85	1 Q	1:02.26	1st place, gold medalist(s)
Carolina Santiago	100 m freestyle S12	—N/a		1:00.12	1st place, gold medalist(s)
Lucilene da Silva	100 m freestyle S12	—N/a		1:02.10	2nd place, silver medalist(s)
Esthefany de Oliveira	200 m freestyle S5	3:26.67	5 Q	3:19.11	4
Lídia Vieira	200 m freestyle S5	3:15.49	2 Q	3:12.97	2nd place, silver medalist(s)
Patrícia Pereira	200 m freestyle S5	3:23.74	4 Q	3:20.04	5
Ana Karolina Soares	200 m freestyle S14	2:22.11	1 Q	2:17.66	1st place, gold medalist(s)
Beatriz Borges	200 m freestyle S14	2:22.98	2 Q	2:21.16	2nd place, silver medalist(s)
Débora Borges	200 m freestyle S14	2:23.51	5 Q	2:22.46	3rd place, bronze medalist(s)
Laila Suzigan	400 m freestyle S6	—N/a		5:32.10	1st place, gold medalist(s)
Mayara do Amaral	400 m freestyle S6	—N/a		5:51.94	2nd place, silver medalist(s)
Cecília Jerônimo	400 m freestyle S8	—N/a		5:11.97	1st place, gold medalist(s)
Edênia Garcia	50 m backstroke S4	59.39	3 Q	59.33	3rd place, bronze medalist(s)
Lídia Vieira	50 m backstroke S4	52.66	1 Q	53.43	2nd place, silver medalist(s)
Patrícia Pereira	50 m backstroke S4	1:00.37	4 Q	59.78	4
Susana Schnarndorf	50 m backstroke S4	1:00.45	5 Q	1:01.17	5
Alessandra Oliveira	50 m backstroke S5	59.91	8 Q	55.70	7
Esthefany de Oliveira	50 m backstroke S5	55.52	6 Q	54.72	6
Mayara do Amaral	100 m backstroke S6	—N/a		1:34.92	4
Cecília Jerônimo	100 m backstroke S8	1:27.89	3 Q	1:24.07	2nd place, silver medalist(s)
Vitória Ribeiro	100 m backstroke S8	1:36.49	8 Q	1:35.86	8
Mariana Gesteira	100 m backstroke S9	—N/a		1:10.10	1st place, gold medalist(s)
Ana Karolina Soares	100 m backstroke S14	1:12.21	1 Q	1:09.96	1st place, gold medalist(s)
Beatriz Borges	100 m backstroke S14	1:22.21	7 Q	1:18.37	6
Lídia Vieira	50 m breaststroke SB3	—N/a		1:08.49	3rd place, bronze medalist(s)
Patrícia Pereira	50 m breaststroke SB3	—N/a		58.19	1st place, gold medalist(s)
Alessandra Oliveira	100 m breaststroke SB4	—N/a		2:10.54	1st place, gold medalist(s)
Susana Schnarndorf	100 m breaststroke SB4	—N/a		2:31.64	3rd place, bronze medalist(s)
Esthefany de Oliveira	100 m breaststroke SB5	—N/a		2:06.07	2nd place, silver medalist(s)
Laila Suzigan	100 m breaststroke SB5	—N/a		1:57.01	1st place, gold medalist(s)
Carolina Santiago	100 m breaststroke SB12	—N/a		1:17.69	1st place, gold medalist(s)
Raquel Viel	100 m breaststroke SB12	—N/a		1:31.10	4
Ana Karolina Soares	100 m breaststroke SB14	—N/a		1:28.99	7
Beatriz Borges	100 m breaststroke SB14	—N/a		1:14.98	1st place, gold medalist(s)
Débora Borges	100 m breaststroke SB14	—N/a		1:15.02	2nd place, silver medalist(s)
Alessandra Oliveira	50 m butterfly S5	—N/a		56.60	4
Esthefany de Oliveira	50 m butterfly S5	—N/a		47.08	1st place, gold medalist(s)
Laila Suzigan	50 m butterfly S6	—N/a		40.56	2nd place, silver medalist(s)
Mayara do Amaral	50 m butterfly S6	—N/a		38.10	1st place, gold medalist(s)
Cecília Jerônimo	100 m butterfly S8	—N/a		1:20.44	2nd place, silver medalist(s)
Vitória Ribeiro	100 m butterfly S8	—N/a		1:17.56	1st place, gold medalist(s)
Ana Karolina Soares	100 m butterfly S14	1:14.95	=3 Q	1:10.73	1st place, gold medalist(s)
Débora Borges	100 m butterfly S14	1:19.07	7 Q	1:16.97	7
Lídia Vieira	150 m individual medley SM4	—N/a		3:13.72	3rd place, bronze medalist(s)
Patrícia Pereira	150 m individual medley SM4	—N/a		3:06.10	2nd place, silver medalist(s)
Susana Schnarndorf	150 m individual medley SM4	—N/a		3:15.10	4
Alessandra Oliveira	200 m individual medley SM5	—N/a		4:13.14	4
Esthefany de Oliveira	200 m individual medley SM5	—N/a		3:47.42	1st place, gold medalist(s)
Laila Suzigan	200 m individual medley SM6	—N/a		3:25.52	2nd place, silver medalist(s)
Mayara do Amaral	200 m individual medley SM6	—N/a		3:28.85	3rd place, bronze medalist(s)
Cecília Jerônimo	200 m individual medley SM8	3:17.44	3 Q	3:05.36	2nd place, silver medalist(s)
Ana Karolina Soares	200 m individual medley SM14	2:43.60	4 Q	2:37.35	1st place, gold medalist(s)
Beatriz Borges	200 m individual medley SM14	2:39.44	1 Q	2:38.52	3rd place, bronze medalist(s)
Débora Borges	200 m individual medley SM14	2:40.95	2 Q	2:38.45	2nd place, silver medalist(s)

Mixed

Athlete	Event	Final	
Athlete	Event	Time	Rank
Samuel da Silva; Tiago Ferreira; Laila Suzigan; Patrícia Pereira	4 × 50 m freestyle relay 20pts	2:26.60	1st place, gold medalist(s)
Phelipe Rodrigues; Talisson Glock; Cecília Jerônimo; Mariana Gesteira	4 × 100 m freestyle relay 34pts	4:09.00	1st place, gold medalist(s)
Douglas Matera; Matheus Rheine; Carolina Santiago; Lucilene da Silva	4 × 100 m freestyle relay 49pts	4:00.83	1st place, gold medalist(s)
Roberto Alcalde; Samuel da Silva; Mayara do Amaral; Patrícia Pereira	4 × 50 m medley relay 20pts	2:41.13	1st place, gold medalist(s)
Gabriel Silva; Lucas Lamente; Cecília Jerônimo; Mariana Gesteira	4 × 100 m medley relay 34pts	4:38.29	1st place, gold medalist(s)
Douglas Matera; Wendell Belarmino; Carolina Santiago; Lucilene da Silva	4 × 100 m medley relay 49pts	4:30.80	1st place, gold medalist(s)

== Table tennis ==
Men

Athlete	Event	Preliminaries					Round of 16	Quarterfinals	Semifinals	Final / BM	
Athlete	Event	Opposition Result	Opposition Result	Opposition Result	Opposition Result	Rank	Opposition Result	Opposition Result	Opposition Result	Opposition Result	Rank
Guilherme Marcião	Singles C2	Espíndola (BRA); W 3–2	Flores (CHI); L 0–3	Reyes (MEX); W 3–0	Isherwood (CAN); W 3–0	2	—N/a				2nd place, silver medalist(s)
Iranildo Espíndola	Singles C2	Marcião (BRA); L 2–3	Reyes (MEX); W 3–0	Isherwood (CAN); W 3–0	Flores (CHI); L 0–3	3	—N/a				3rd place, bronze medalist(s)
David Freitas	Singles C3	Bienati (ARG); W 3–1	Acosta (URU); W 3–0	Nodarse (CUB); W 3–0	—N/a	1 Q	—N/a	Copola (ARG); L 0–3	Did not advance		
Fábio Silva	Singles C3	Sánchez (COL); W 3–0	Van Emburgh (USA); L 0–3	—N/a		2 Q	—N/a	Acosta (URU); W 3–0	Quijada (VEN); W 3–2	Van Emburgh (USA); L 1–3	2nd place, silver medalist(s)
Eziquiel Babes	Singles C4	Mudassar (CAN); W 3–2	Sanchez (MEX); L 2–3	—N/a		2 Q	—N/a	González (MEX); L 2–3	Did not advance		
Cadu Moraes	Singles C5	Romero (ARG); L 1–3	Salazar (GUA); W 3–0	—N/a		2 Q	—N/a		Arabian (BRA); L 2–3	Did not advance	3rd place, bronze medalist(s)
Lucas Arabian	Singles C5	Depergola (ARG); W 3–0	Sarand (USA); W 3–0	—N/a		1 Q	—N/a		Moraes (BRA); W 3–2	Romero (ARG); L 2–3	2nd place, silver medalist(s)
Israel Stroh	Singles C7	Khazandjian (ARG); W 3–1	Bahamondes (CHI); W 3–1	—N/a		1 Q	—N/a	Bye	Kaniuka (ARG); W 3–1	Salmin (BRA); L 1–3	2nd place, silver medalist(s)
Paulo Salmin	Singles C7	Castro (COL); W 3–0	Kaniuka (ARG); W 3–0	Córdoba (PAN); W 3–0	—N/a	1 Q	—N/a	Bye	Vargas (COL); W 3–1	Stroh (BRA); W 3–1	1st place, gold medalist(s)
Jean Carlos Mashki	Singles C8	Kent (CAN); W 3–1	Makkar (USA); W 3–2	Pérez (ARG); L 1–3	—N/a	2 Q	—N/a	Polo (ECU); W 3–1	Manara (BRA); L 0–3	Did not advance	3rd place, bronze medalist(s)
Luiz Manara	Singles C8	Cordova (ESA); W 3–0	Barrientos (ARG); W 3–0	—N/a		1 Q	—N/a	Bye	Mashki (BRA); W 3–0	Roman (CRC); W 3–0	1st place, gold medalist(s)
Lucas Carvalho	Singles C9	López (PUR); W 3–0	Skliarsky (ARG); W 3–0	—N/a		1 Q	—N/a	Bye	Watson (USA); W 3–2	Leibovitz (USA); L 0–3	2nd place, silver medalist(s)
Cláudio Massad	Singles C10	Regalado (ESA); W 3–0	Vasquez (USA); W 3–1	—N/a		1 Q	—N/a	Ramírez (COL); W 3–0	Puerto (COL); W 3–0	Echaveguren (CHI); W 3–0	1st place, gold medalist(s)
Gabriel Antunes	Singles C10	Orellana (GUA); W 3–0	Neira (ARG); W 3–0	—N/a		1 Q	—N/a	Vasquez (USA); W 3–1	Echaveguren (CHI); L 0–3	Did not advance	3rd place, bronze medalist(s)
Thiago Simões	Singles C11	Suquillo (ECU); W 3–0	Vazquez (MEX); W 3–0	—N/a		1 Q	—N/a		Rosas (CHI); W 3–1	Martinez (VEN); W 3–0	1st place, gold medalist(s)
Guilherme Marcião; Iranildo Espíndola	Doubles C4	Fernández / Nodarse (CUB); W 3–0	Bustamante / Eberhardt (ARG); W 3–0	Flores / Leiva (CHI); W 3–0	—N/a	1	—N/a				1st place, gold medalist(s)
Cadu Moraes; David Freitas	Doubles C8	—N/a					Godfrey / Pickett (USA); W 3–0	Copola / Romero (ARG); W 3–2	González / Rodríguez (CHI); L 0–3	Did not advance	3rd place, bronze medalist(s)
Fábio Silva; Lucas Arabian	Doubles C8	—N/a					Bye	Quijada / Sandoval (VEN); W 3–0	González / Reyes (MEX); W 3–0	González / Rodríguez (CHI); L 0–3	2nd place, silver medalist(s)
Israel Stroh; Paulo Salmin	Doubles C14	Arguello / Roman (CRC); W 3–1	Kaniuka / Martinez (ARG); W 3–0	—N/a		1 Q	—N/a		Makkar / Seidenfeld (USA); W 3–2	Pino / Torres (CHI); L 1–3	2nd place, silver medalist(s)
Cláudio Massad; Luiz Manara	Doubles C18	—N/a					Polo / Sarmiento (ECU); W 3–0	Castro / Ramírez (COL); W 3–2	Bahamondes / Echaveguren (CHI); L 0–3	Did not advance	3rd place, bronze medalist(s)
Gabriel Antunes; Jean Carlos Mashki	Doubles C18	—N/a					Barrientos / Skliarsky (ARG); W 3–0	Puerto / Vargas (COL); W 3–1	Leibovitz / Watson (USA); W 3–1	Bahamondes / Echaveguren (CHI); W 3–2	1st place, gold medalist(s)

Women

Athlete	Event	Preliminaries				Quarterfinals	Semifinals	Final / BM	
Athlete	Event	Opposition Result	Opposition Result	Opposition Result	Rank	Opposition Result	Opposition Result	Opposition Result	Rank
Carla Maia	Singles C1–3	Santos (BRA); L 0–3	Garrone (ARG); L 0–3	—N/a	3	Did not advance			
Cátia Oliveira	Singles C1–3	Zamora (CUB); L 2–3	Guapi (COL); L 0–3	—N/a	3	Did not advance			
Joyce de Oliveira	Singles C1–3	Blanco (ARG); W 3–0	Fontaine (USA); W 3–0	—N/a	1 Q	Garrone (ARG); W 3–0	Severo (BRA); W 3–1	Santos (BRA); L 1–3	2nd place, silver medalist(s)
Marliane Santos	Singles C1–3	Maia (BRA); W 3–0	Garrone (ARG); W 3–1	—N/a	1 Q	Blanco (ARG); W 3–0	Sigala (MEX); W 3–2	Oliveira (BRA); W 3–1	1st place, gold medalist(s)
Thais Severo	Singles C1–3	Padilla (CRC); W 3–0	Sigala (MEX); W 3–0	García (VEN); W 3–0	1 Q	Guapi (COL); W 3–0	Oliveira (BRA); L 1–3	Did not advance	3rd place, bronze medalist(s)
Aline Meneses	Singles C6–7	Muñoz (ARG); L 0–3	Mazuera (COL); W 3–0	—N/a	2 Q	—N/a	Perez (MEX); L 0–3	Did not advance	3rd place, bronze medalist(s)
Lethicia Lacerda	Singles C8	Pérez (CHI); L 2–3	Arreola (GUA); W 3–0	—N/a	2 Q	—N/a	Kelmer (BRA); L 0–3	Did not advance	3rd place, bronze medalist(s)
Sophia Kelmer	Singles C8	Rivera (ESA); W 3–0	Araya (CRC); W 3–0	—N/a	1 Q	—N/a	Lacerda (BRA); W 3–0	Pérez (CHI); L 1–3	2nd place, silver medalist(s)
Allana Maschio	Singles C9–10	Parinos (BRA); L 1–3	Espinoza (CHI); W 3–0	Alzate (COL); L 2–3	2 Q	—N/a	Rauen (BRA); L 0–3	Did not advance	3rd place, bronze medalist(s)
Danielle Rauen	Singles C9–10	Gongora (MEX); W 3–0	Yevenes (CHI); W 3–0	—N/a	1 Q	—N/a	Maschio (BRA); W 3–0	Parinos (BRA); W 3–0	1st place, gold medalist(s)
Jennyfer Parinos	Singles C9–10	Maschio (BRA); W 3–1	Alzate (COL); W 3–1	Espinoza (CHI); W 3–0	1 Q	—N/a	Gongora (MEX); W 3–0	Rauen (BRA); L 0–3	2nd place, silver medalist(s)
Cátia Oliveira; Joyce de Oliveira	Doubles C5–10	Fontaine / Rolph (USA); W 3–0	Guapi / Sanchez (COL); W 3–0	—N/a	1 Q	—N/a	Garrone / Kuell (ARG); W 3–0	Santos / Severo (BRA); W 3–0	1st place, gold medalist(s)
Marliane Santos; Thais Severo	Doubles C5–10	Garrone / Kuell (ARG); W 3–2	Sigala / Verdin (MEX); W 3–1	Leonelli / Ortiz (CHI); W 3–0	1 Q	—N/a	Guapi / Sanchez (COL); W 3–0	Oliveira / Oliveira (BRA); L 0–3	2nd place, silver medalist(s)
Danielle Rauen; Jennyfer Parinos	Doubles C14–20	Alzate / Mazuera (COL); W 3–0	Gongora / Perez (MEX); W 3–0	—N/a	1 Q	—N/a	Lacerda / Kelmer (BRA); W 3–0	Espinoza / Yevenes (CHI); W 3–0	1st place, gold medalist(s)
Lethicia Lacerda; Sophia Kelmer	Doubles C14–20	Araya / Morales (CRC); W 3–1	Espinoza / Yevenes (CHI); L 0–3	—N/a	2 Q	—N/a	Rauen / Parinos (BRA); L 0–3	Did not advance	3rd place, bronze medalist(s)

Mixed

Athlete	Event	Preliminaries			Round of 16	Quarterfinals	Semifinals	Final / BM	
Athlete	Event	Opposition Result	Opposition Result	Rank	Opposition Result	Opposition Result	Opposition Result	Opposition Result	Rank
Eziquiel Babes; Thais Severo	Doubles C4–7	—N/a			Bye	Nodarse / Zamora (CUB); W 3–0	Van Emburgh / Fontaine (USA); W 3–0	Arabian / Oliveira (BRA); L 1–3	2nd place, silver medalist(s)
Lucas Arabian; Cátia Oliveira	Doubles C4–7	—N/a			Bye	Valencia / Guapi (COL); W 3–1	Romero / Garrone (ARG); W 3–0	Babes / Severo (BRA); W 3–1	1st place, gold medalist(s)
David Freitas; Marliane Santos	Doubles C10	—N/a				González / Verdin (MEX); L 2–3	Did not advance		
Fábio Silva; Joyce de Oliveira	Doubles C10	—N/a				Sánchez / Sanchez (COL); W 3–0	Copola / Kuell (ARG); W 3–0	Rodríguez / Leonelli (CHI); W 3–0	1st place, gold medalist(s)
Israel Stroh; Jennyfer Parinos	Doubles C14–17	—N/a			Bye	Vargas / Mazuera (COL); W 3–0	Neira / Muñoz (ARG); W 3–0	Torres / Pérez (CHI); L 2–3	2nd place, silver medalist(s)
Lucas Carvalho; Sophia Kelmer	Doubles C14–17	—N/a			Bye	Roman / Araya (CRC); W 3–0	Torres / Pérez (CHI); L 2–3	Did not advance	3rd place, bronze medalist(s)
Gabriel Antunes; Danielle Rauen	Doubles C20	Orellana / Arreola (GUA); W 3–0	Preza / Gongora (MEX); W 3–0	1 Q	—N/a		Puerto / Alzate (COL); W 3–0	Echaveguren / Espinoza (CHI); W 3–0	1st place, gold medalist(s)
Cláudio Massad; Allana Maschio	Doubles C20	Puerto / Alzate (COL); L 1–3	Echaveguren / Espinoza (CHI); L 1–3	3	Did not advance				

== Taekwondo ==
Men

Athlete	Event	Round of 16	Quarterfinals	Semifinals	Repechage	Final / BM	
Athlete	Event	Opposition Result	Opposition Result	Opposition Result	Opposition Result	Opposition Result	Rank
Cicero do Nascimento	−58 kg	Bye	Mejía (GUA); L 3–16	Did not advance	Andrade (VEN); W 31–26	Bronze medal final Fernandez (ARG); W 30–25	3rd place, bronze medalist(s)
Fabrício Marques	−58 kg	Bye	Andrade (VEN); W 39–21	Mejía (GUA); W 15–6	Bye	Torres (MEX); L 17–18	2nd place, silver medalist(s)
Nathan Torquato	−63 kg	—N/a	Figueroa (VEN); W 33–2	Novik (ARG); W 27–6	Bye	Castro (DOM); W 18–16	1st place, gold medalist(s)
Carlos Geraldo Coelho	−70 kg	Bye	Fontan (PUR); W 36–6	Suarez (CUB); L 9–14	Bye	Bronze medal final Peña (COL); W 31–29	3rd place, bronze medalist(s)
Pedro Vieira	−70 kg	Bye	Suarez (CUB); L 8–28	Did not advance	Fontan (PUR); L 5–31	Did not advance	
Claro Lopes	−80 kg	—N/a	Kacer (USA); W 28–8	Molina (CRC); L 7–15	Bye	Bronze medal final Carrillo (CHI); W 30–2	3rd place, bronze medalist(s)
Joel Gomes	−80 kg	—N/a	Carrillo (CHI); W 8–2	Najera (MEX); L 16–23	Bye	Bronze medal final Loonstra (ARU); L 22–27	=5
Lucas Moraes	+80 kg	—N/a	Pedroza (MEX); W 23–2	Paulo (BRA); W 17–13	Bye	Medell (USA); L 0–10	2nd place, silver medalist(s)
Pedro Paulo	+80 kg	—N/a	Sosa (CUB); W 14–5	Moraes (BRA); L 13–17	Bye	Bronze medal final Muñoz (CHI); W 29–0	3rd place, bronze medalist(s)

Women

Athlete	Event	Quarterfinals	Semifinals	Final / BM	
Athlete	Event	Opposition Result	Opposition Result	Opposition Result	Rank
Miriam Pio	−47 kg	Rodríguez (CUB); L 6–37	Did not advance	Bronze medal final Correia (BRA); L 1–25	5
Teresinha Correia	−47 kg	Bye	Espinoza (PER); L 6–22	Bronze medal final Pio (BRA); W 25–1	3rd place, bronze medalist(s)
Cristhiane Neves	−52 kg	—N/a	Stumpf (BRA); L 5–7	Bronze medal final Geraldo (DOM); W 21–17	3rd place, bronze medalist(s)
Maria Eduarda Stumpf	−52 kg	—N/a	Neves (BRA); W 7–5	García (MEX); W 5–3	1st place, gold medalist(s)
Elisangela Matias	−57 kg	Morales (VEN); L 3–34	Did not advance	Bronze medal final Lopes (BRA); L 5–11	5
Larissa Lopes	−57 kg	Bye	Koyama (MEX); L 6–36	Bronze medal final Matias (BRA); W 11–5	3rd place, bronze medalist(s)
Silvana Fernandes	−57 kg	Bye	Morales (VEN); W 23–5	Koyama (MEX); W 38–1	1st place, gold medalist(s)
Ana Carolina Moura	−65 kg	Bye	Fuentes (CHI); W 33–2	Martinez (MEX); W 12–5	1st place, gold medalist(s)
Leylianne Ramos	−65 kg	Bye	Martinez (MEX); L 4–6	Bronze medal final Martinez (COL); W 14–14	3rd place, bronze medalist(s)
Camila Macedo	+65 kg	Bye	Vargas (MEX); L 3–5	Bronze medal final Puntriano (PER); W 5–1	3rd place, bronze medalist(s)
Débora Menezes	+65 kg	Bye	Montes de Oca (CUB); W 26–6	Vargas (MEX); L 6–8	2nd place, silver medalist(s)

== Wheelchair basketball ==
Summary

Team	Event	Group stage				Quarterfinal	Semifinal	Final / BM	
Team	Event	Opposition Score	Opposition Score	Opposition Score	Rank	Opposition Score	Opposition Score	Opposition Score	Rank
Brazil men's	Men's tournament	United States; L 42–82	Colombia; L 56–66	Puerto Rico; W 88–36	3 Q	Argentina; L 43–62	Did not advance	Fifth place match Venezuela; W 79–38	5
Brazil women's	Women's tournament	Canada; L 44–61	Colombia; W 72–20	El Salvador; W 78–9	2 Q	—N/a	United States; L 30–60	Bronze medal match Argentina; W 56–28	3rd place, bronze medalist(s)

== Wheelchair rugby ==
Summary

Team	Event	Group stage						Semifinal	Final / BM	
Team	Event	Opposition Score	Opposition Score	Opposition Score	Opposition Score	Opposition Score	Rank	Opposition Score	Opposition Score	Rank
Brazil national team	Mixed tournament	Colombia; L 48–55	Canada; L 41–62	Argentina; W 58–37	United States; L 36–54	Chile; W 66–28	4 Q	Canada; L 45–60	Bronze medal match Colombia; W 57–52	3rd place, bronze medalist(s)

== Wheelchair tennis ==
Men

Athlete	Event	Round of 32	Round of 16	Quarterfinals	Semifinals	Final / BM	
Athlete	Event	Opposition Result	Opposition Result	Opposition Result	Opposition Result	Opposition Result	Rank
Daniel Rodrigues	Singles	Bye	Oquendo (COL); W 6–2, 6–2	Stroud (USA); W 6–3, 6–2	Fernández (ARG); L 2–6, 1–6	Bronze medal match Ratzlaff (USA); W 6–3, 6–7^{(3–7)}, 6–3	3rd place, bronze medalist(s)
Gustavo Carneiro	Singles	Bye	Apaza (PER); W 6–0, 6–0	Cataldo (CHI); L 1–6, 4–6	Did not advance		
Daniel Rodrigues; Gustavo Carneiro	Doubles	—N/a	Bye	Bello / Godoy (VEN); W 6–1, 6–0	Ratzlaff / Stroud (USA); W 1–6, 6–2, 10–5	Casco / Fernández (ARG); L 7–5, 1–6, 3–10	2nd place, silver medalist(s)

Women

Athlete	Event	Round of 16	Quarterfinals	Semifinals	Final / BM	
Athlete	Event	Opposition Result	Opposition Result	Opposition Result	Opposition Result	Rank
Maria Fernanda Alves	Singles	Phelps (USA); L 4–6, 3–6	Did not advance			
Meirycoll Duval	Singles	Mathewson (USA); L 2–6, 1–6	Did not advance			
Maria Fernanda Alves; Meirycoll Duval	Doubles	—N/a	Lasso / Meza (ECU); W 6–0, 6–0	Bernal / Martínez (COL); W 7–6^{(7–3)}, 5–7, 10–7	Mathewson / Phelps (USA); L 6–3, 2–6, 8–10	2nd place, silver medalist(s)

Quad

Athlete	Event	Round of 16	Quarterfinals	Semifinals	Final / BM	
Athlete	Event	Opposition Result	Opposition Result	Opposition Result	Opposition Result	Rank
Leandro Pena	Singles	Moreno (COL); W 6–0, 6–0	Wagner (USA); W 6–0, 6–2	Cayulef (CHI); L 6–3, 2–6, 3–6	Bronze medal match Silva (BRA); W 6–2, 7–6^{(7–5)}	3rd place, bronze medalist(s)
Ymanitu Silva	Singles	Bye	Campaz (COL); W 6–1, 3–6, 6–3	Shaw (CAN); L 4–6, 7–5, 3–6	Bronze medal match Pena (BRA); L 2–6, 6–7^{(5–7)}	4
Leandro Pena; Ymanitu Silva	Doubles	—N/a	Bye	Campaz / Moreno (COL); W 4–6, 6–0, 10–5	Cayulef / Pérez (CHI); L 7–6^{(7–5)}, 2–6, 7–10	2nd place, silver medalist(s)

== See also ==
- Brazil at the 2023 Pan American Games
- Brazil at the 2024 Summer Paralympics
