= Athletics at the 2023 Parapan American Games – Men's 400 metres T20 =

Men's 400 metres T20 at the 2023 Parapan American Games
- Venue: Mario Recordón Athletics Training Center
- Dates: November 23 - November 24
- Competitors: 11 from 8 nations
- Winning time: 46.48

Medalists
1st place, gold medalist(s)		Samuel Oliveira	Brazil
2nd place, silver medalist(s)		Jhon Obando	Colombia
3rd place, bronze medalist(s)		Luis Felipe Rodríguez	Venezuela

The men's T20 400 metres competition of the athletics events at the 2023 Parapan American Games was held on November 23 - 24 at the Mario Recordón Athletics Training Center within the Julio Martínez National Stadium of Santiago, Chile.

== Records ==
Prior to this competition, the existing world and Pan American Games records were as follows:

World record	Daniel Tavares (BRA)	47.58	São Paulo, Brazil	April 27, 2019
Parapan American Games record	Daniel Tavares (BRA)	47.58	Lima, Peru	August 27, 2019
Americas record	Daniel Tavares (BRA)	47.58	São Paulo, Brazil	April 27, 2019

== Schedule ==
Date	Time	Round
November 23, 2023	17:29	Semifinals
November 24, 2023	15:30	Final

== Results ==
All times shown are in seconds.

KEY:	q	Fastest non-qualifiers	Q	Qualified	PR	Parapan Games record	NR	National record	SB	Seasonal best	DQ	Disqualified

=== Semifinals ===
The fastest two athletes of each semifinal advance to the final. The results were as follows:

Rank	Heat	Name	Nationality	Time	Notes
1	2	Jhon Obando	Colombia	48.46	Q
2	2	Luis Felipe Rodríguez	Venezuela	49.14	Q
3	2	Jhan Carlos Wisdom	Panama	49.17	Q
4	1	Samuel Oliveira	Brazil	49.47	Q
5	2	Daniel Tavares	Brazil	49.55	q
6	1	Anderson Colorado	Ecuador	49.74	Q
7	1	Luis Arturo Paiva	Venezuela	49.87	Q
8	1	Samuel Guarín	Colombia	50.39	q
9	2	Eddie Santiago	Mexico	52.38	
10	2	Kermyth Forbes	Costa Rica	53.68	
11	1	Theodor Thomas	Jamaica	57.78	SB

=== Final ===
The results were as follows:

Rank	Lane	Name	Nationality	Time	Notes
1st place, gold medalist(s)	6	Samuel Oliveira	Brazil	46.48	WR
2nd place, silver medalist(s)	4	Jhon Obando	Colombia	46.79	
3rd place, bronze medalist(s)	5	Luis Felipe Rodríguez	Venezuela	47.40	SB
4	3	Anderson Colorado	Ecuador	48.46	
5	7	Jhan Carlos Wisdom	Panama	49.02	
6	2	Daniel Tavares	Brazil	49.58	
7	8	Luis Arturo Paiva	Venezuela	50.11	
8	1	Samuel Guarín	Colombia	50.19	
