= Swimming at the 2023 Parapan American Games – Men's 50 metre freestyle S5 =

Men's 50 metre freestyle S5 at the 2023 Parapan American Games
- Venue: Aquatic Centre
- Date: November 18
- Competitors: 12 from 8 nations
- Winning time: 31.40

Medalists
1st place, gold medalist(s)		Samuel da Silva	Brazil
2nd place, silver medalist(s)		Tiago de Oliveira	Brazil
3rd place, bronze medalist(s)		Abbas Karimi	United States

The men's 50 metre freestyle S5 competition of the swimming events at the 2023 Parapan American Games were held on November 18, 2023, at the Aquatic Center within the Julio Martínez National Stadium in Santiago, Chile. The event includes both S4 and S5 athletes.

== Records ==
Prior to this competition, the existing world and Pan American Games records were as follows:

S4

World record	Ami Omer Dadaon (ISR)	36.25	Funchal, Portugal	June 16, 2022
Parapan American Games record	Gustavo Sánchez (MEX)	40.29	Guadalajara, Mexico	November 14, 2011

S5

World record	Jincheng Guo (CHN)	29.78	Manchester, Great Britain	July 31, 2023
Parapan American Games record	Daniel Dias (BRA)	32.41	Toronto, Canada	August 12, 2015

== Results ==
KEY:	QA	Qualified for A final	QB	Qualified for B final	PR	Games record	NR	National record	PB	Personal best	SB	Seasonal best

=== Heats ===
The highest eight scores advance to the final.

Rank	Heat	Lane	Class	Name	Nationality	Time	Notes
1	2	4	S5	Samuel da Silva	Brazil	31.97	Q, PR
2	1	4	S5	Tiago de Oliveira	Brazil	34.69	Q
3	2	5	S5	Abbas Karimi	United States	36.94	Q
4	1	5	S5	Kevin Moreno	Colombia	37.63	Q
5	1	3	S4	Ángel Camacho	Mexico	38.74	Q, PR
6	2	3	S5	Alan Basílio	Brazil	38.76	Q
7	1	6	S5	Marcos Jimenez	Dominican Republic	38.91	Q
8	2	6	S5	Williams Mattamala	Chile	40.68	Q
9	1	2	S5	Leonardo Kanashiro	Peru	48.40	
10	1	7	S4	Antonio Henriquez	Venezuela	51.16	
11	2	7	S5	Jesús Ruiz	Mexico	51.48	
12	2	2	S4	Luis Patiño	Colombia	54.97	

=== Final ===
The final was held on November 18

Rank	Lane	Class	Name	Nationality	Time	Notes
1st place, gold medalist(s)	4	S5	Samuel da Silva	Brazil	31.40	PR
2nd place, silver medalist(s)	5	S5	Tiago de Oliveira	Brazil	34.46	
3rd place, bronze medalist(s)	3	S5	Abbas Karimi	United States	36.88	
4	6	S5	Kevin Moreno	Colombia	37.49	
5	1	S5	Marcos Jimenez	Dominican Republic	38.05	
6	2	S4	Ángel Camacho	Mexico	38.22	PR
6	7	S5	Alan Basílio	Brazil	38.22	
8	8	S5	Williams Mattamala	Chile	41.68	
