= Powerlifting at the 2023 Parapan American Games – Men's 54 kg =

Men's 54 kg at the 2023 Parapan American Games
- Venue: Chimkowe Gym
- Dates: November 19
- Competitors: 6 from 5 nations

Medalists
1st place, gold medalist(s)		Bruno Carra	Brazil
2nd place, silver medalist(s)		Pablo Ramirez Barrientos	Cuba
3rd place, bronze medalist(s)		João Maria França	Brazil

The men's 54 kg competition of the powerlifting events at the 2023 Parapan American Games was held on November 19 at the Chimkowe Gym in Santiago, Chile.

== Records ==
Prior to this competition, the existing world and Pan American Games records were as follows:

World record	Sherif Osman (EGY)	205 kg	Dubai, United Arab Emirates	April 6, 2014
Parapan American Games record	Bruno Carra (BRA)	163 kg	Lima, Peru	August 29, 2019
Americas record	Bruno Carra (BRA)	165 kg	Abuja, Nigeria	February 5, 2020

== Results ==
The results were as follows:

Rank	Name	Body weight (kg)	Attempts (kg)				Result (kg)
Rank	Name	Body weight (kg)	1	2	3	4	Result (kg)
1st place, gold medalist(s)	Bruno Carra (BRA)	53.7	160	161	~~163~~		161
2nd place, silver medalist(s)	Pablo Ramirez Barrientos (CUB)	53.0	155	159	161		161
3rd place, bronze medalist(s)	João Maria França (BRA)	53.7	157	160	~~162~~		160
4	Carlos Yajue (COL)	52.8	149	153	158		158
5	Jonathan Echeverría (ECU)	53.6	140	146	~~150~~		146
6	David Montiel (MEX)	53.2	140	145	~~150~~		145
