= Athletics at the 2023 Parapan American Games – Men's 100 metres T37 =

Men's 100 metres T37 at the 2023 Parapan American Games
- Venue: Mario Recordón Athletics Training Center
- Dates: November 23
- Competitors: 6 from 4 nations
- Winning time: 11.10

Medalists
1st place, gold medalist(s)		Ricardo Gomes de Mendonça	Brazil
2nd place, silver medalist(s)		Christian Gabriel Luiz	Brazil
3rd place, bronze medalist(s)		Andrés Malambo	Colombia

The men's T37 100 metres competition of the athletics events at the 2023 Parapan American Games was held on November 23 at the Mario Recordón Athletics Training Center within the Julio Martínez National Stadium of Santiago, Chile.

== Records ==
Prior to this competition, the existing world and Pan American Games records were as follows:

World record	Nick Mayhugh (USA)	10.95	Tokyo, Japan	August 27, 2021
Parapan American Games record	Mateus Evangelista Cardoso (BRA)	11.68	Lima, Peru	August 26, 2019
Americas record	Nick Mayhugh (USA)	10.95	Tokyo, Japan	August 27, 2021

== Schedule ==
Date	Time	Round
November 23, 2023	15:26	Final

== Results ==
All times shown are in seconds.

KEY:	q	Fastest non-qualifiers	Q	Qualified	PR	Parapan Games record	NR	National record	SB	Seasonal best	DQ	Disqualified

=== Final ===
The results were as follows:
Wind: +1.4 m/s

Rank	Lane	Name	Nationality	Time	Notes
1st place, gold medalist(s)	5	Ricardo Gomes de Mendonça	Brazil	11.10	PR
2nd place, silver medalist(s)	3	Christian Gabriel Luiz	Brazil	11.49	
3rd place, bronze medalist(s)	4	Andrés Malambo	Colombia	11.57	SB
4	6	Yeferson Suárez	Colombia	11.77	SB
5	8	David Pleitez	El Salvador	12.72	SB
6	7	Erick Colón	Puerto Rico	13.50	SB
