= Athletics at the 2023 Parapan American Games – Men's 200 metres T37 =

Men's 200 metres T37 at the 2023 Parapan American Games
- Venue: Mario Recordón Athletics Training Center
- Dates: November 26
- Competitors: 7 from 5 nations
- Winning time: 22.51

Medalists
1st place, gold medalist(s)		Ricardo Gomes de Mendonça	Brazil
2nd place, silver medalist(s)		Christian Gabriel Luiz	Brazil
3rd place, bronze medalist(s)		Andrés Malambo	Colombia

The men's T37 200 metres competition of the athletics events at the 2023 Parapan American Games was held on November 23 at the Mario Recordón Athletics Training Center within the Julio Martínez National Stadium of Santiago, Chile.

== Records ==
Prior to this competition, the existing world and Pan American Games records were as follows:

World record	Nick Mayhugh (USA)	21.91	Tokyo, Japan	September 4, 2021
Parapan American Games record	Vitor Antonio De Jesus (BRA)	23.53	Lima, Peru	August 28, 2019
Americas record	Nick Mayhugh (USA)	21.91	Tokyo, Japan	September 4, 2021

== Schedule ==
Date	Time	Round
November 25, 2023	18:53	Final

== Results ==
All times shown are in seconds.

KEY:	q	Fastest non-qualifiers	Q	Qualified	PR	Parapan Games record	NR	National record	SB	Seasonal best	DQ	Disqualified

=== Final ===
The results were as follows:
Wind: +1.9 m/s

Rank	Lane	Name	Nationality	Time	Notes
1st place, gold medalist(s)	6	Ricardo Gomes de Mendonça	Brazil	22.51	PR
2nd place, silver medalist(s)	4	Christian Gabriel Luiz	Brazil	23.02	SB
3rd place, bronze medalist(s)	5	Andrés Malambo	Colombia	23.65	SB
4	3	Yeferson Suárez	Colombia	23.98	SB
5	7	Carlos Daniel Rodríguez	Mexico	25.36	SB
6	8	David Pleitez	El Salvador	25.87	SB
7	2	Erick Colón	Puerto Rico	28.20	
