= Badminton at the 2023 Parapan American Games – Men's singles WH1 =

Men's singles WH1 at the 2023 Parapan American Games
- Venue: Olympic Training Center, Santiago
- Dates: 22–26 November 2023
- Competitors: 9 from 6 nations

Medalists
1st place, gold medalist(s)		Marcelo Conceição	Brazil
2nd place, silver medalist(s)		Rodolfo Cano	Brazil
3rd place, bronze medalist(s)		Victor Aragon Dominguez	Colombia

The men's singles WH1 badminton tournament at the 2023 Parapan American Games is playing from 22 to 26 November 2023 at the Olympic Training Center in Santiago, Chile. A total of 9 players competed at the tournament, three of whom were seeded.

== Competition schedule ==
Plays are taking place between 22 and 26 November 2023.

GS	Group stage	¼	Quarterfinals	½	Semifinals	F	Final

Events	Wed 22	Thu 23	Fri 24	Sat 25	Sun 26
Men's singles WH1	GS	GS	¼	½	F

== Seeds ==
The following players were seeded:

1. Marcelo Conceição (BRA)
2. Rodolfo Cano (BRA)
3. Joaquín Palma (MEX)

== Group Stage ==
=== Group A ===
Pos	Team	Pld	W	L	GF	GA	GD	PF	PA	PD	Qualification
1	Marcelo Conceição (BRA) [1]	0	0	0	0	0	0	0	0	0	Qualification to elimination stage
2	Fernando Vilcachagua (PER)	0	0	0	0	0	0	0	0	0	Qualification to elimination stage
3	Lucas Díaz (ARG)	0	0	0	0	0	0	0	0	0	

First match(es) will be played: 22 November 2023. Source: Group A – standings

Date	Competitor	Score	Competitor	Game 1	Game 2	Game 3
22/11	Marcelo Conceição (Brazil)	[ 2–0]	(Peru) Fernando Vilcachagua	21–03	21–08	
22/11	Fernando Vilcachagua (Peru)	[ 2–0]	(Argentina) Lucas Díaz	21–06	21–09	
23/11	Marcelo Conceição (Brazil)	[ 2–0]	(Argentina) Lucas Díaz	21–07	21–04	

=== Group B ===
Pos	Team	Pld	W	L	GF	GA	GD	PF	PA	PD	Qualification
1	Joaquín Palma (MEX) [3]	0	0	0	0	0	0	0	0	0	Qualification to elimination stage
2	Mikhail Bilenki (CAN)	0	0	0	0	0	0	0	0	0	Qualification to elimination stage
3	Victor Aragon (COL)	0	0	0	0	0	0	0	0	0	

First match(es) will be played: 22 November 2023. Source: Group B – standings

Date	Competitor	Score	Competitor	Game 1	Game 2	Game 3
	Joaquín Palma (Mexico)	[ 0–0]	(Canada) Mikhail Bilenki	–	–	
	Joaquín Palma (Mexico)	[ 0–0]	(Colombia) Victor Aragon	–	–	
	Mikhail Bilenki (Canada)	[ 0–0]	(Colombia) Victor Aragon	–	–	

=== Group C ===
Pos	Team	Pld	W	L	GF	GA	GD	PF	PA	PD	Qualification
1	Rodolfo Cano (BRA) [2]	0	0	0	0	0	0	0	0	0	Qualification to elimination stage
2	Alfonso Quevedo (MEX)	0	0	0	0	0	0	0	0	0	Qualification to elimination stage
3	Ronald Miranda (PER)	0	0	0	0	0	0	0	0	0	

First match(es) will be played: 22 November 2023. Source: Group C – standings

Date	Competitor	Score	Competitor	Game 1	Game 2	Game 3
	Rodolfo Cano (Brazil)	[ 0–0]	(Mexico) Alfonso Quevedo	–	–	
	Rodolfo Cano (Brazil)	[ 0–0]	(Peru) Ronald Miranda	–	–	
	Alfonso Quevedo (Mexico)	[ 0–0]	(Peru) Ronald Miranda	–	–	

== Elimination round ==
Top two ranked in each group qualified to the elimination round, the draw was decided after the previous round finished.

Quarter-finals

Semi-finals

Gold medal match
Bronze medal match
