= Athletics at the 2023 Parapan American Games – Men's 100 metres T47 =

Men's 100 metres T47 at the 2023 Parapan American Games
- Venue: Mario Recordón Athletics Training Center
- Dates: November 24 - November 25
- Competitors: 12 from 7 nations
- Winning time: 10.34

Medalists
1st place, gold medalist(s)		Petrúcio Ferreira	Brazil
2nd place, silver medalist(s)		Washington Assis	Brazil
3rd place, bronze medalist(s)		Raciel González	Cuba

The men's T47 100 metres competition of the athletics events at the 2023 Parapan American Games was held on November 24 - 25 at the Mario Recordón Athletics Training Center within the Julio Martínez National Stadium of Santiago, Chile.

== Records ==
Prior to this competition, the existing world and Pan American Games records were as follows:

World record	Petrúcio Ferreira (BRA)	10.29	São Paulo, Brazil	May 31, 2022
Parapan American Games record	Petrúcio Ferreira (BRA)	10.39	Santiago, Chile	November 24, 2023
Americas record	Petrúcio Ferreira (BRA)	10.39	Santiago, Chile	November 24, 2023

== Schedule ==
Date	Time	Round
November 24, 2023	18:57	Semifinals
November 25, 2023	16:10	Final

== Results ==
All times shown are in seconds.

KEY:	q	Fastest non-qualifiers	Q	Qualified	PR	Parapan Games record	NR	National record	SB	Seasonal best	DQ	Disqualified

=== Semifinals ===
The fastest two athletes of each semifinal advance to the final. The results were as follows:

Rank	Heat	Name	Nationality	Time	Notes
1	1	Petrúcio Ferreira	Brazil	10.39	Q, PR
2	1	Raciel González	Cuba	10.79	Q
3	2	Washington Assis	Brazil	10.79	Q
4	1	Tanner Wright	United States	10.98	Q, SB
5	2	José Alexandre Martins	Brazil	11.07	Q
6	2	Joan Daniel Lasso	Colombia	11.20	Q
7	2	Cristian Mejia	Dominican Republic	11.32	q, SB
8	2	Rayven Sample	United States	11.49	q
9	1	Alberto Piriz	Argentina	11.57	SB
10	2	Matías Puebla	Argentina	12.27	SB
11	1	Gerber Ayala	El Salvador	12.35	SB
	1	José Alejandro Messu	Colombia	DNS	

=== Final ===
The results were as follows:

Rank	Lane	Name	Nationality	Time	Notes
1st place, gold medalist(s)	6	Petrúcio Ferreira	Brazil	10.34	
2nd place, silver medalist(s)	3	Washington Assis	Brazil	10.63	
3rd place, bronze medalist(s)	5	Raciel González	Cuba	10.70	
4	7	Tanner Wright	United States	10.91	
5	4	José Alexandre Martins	Brazil	11.05	
6	8	Joan Daniel Lasso	Colombia	11.10	
7	1	Cristian Mejia	Dominican Republic	11.30	
8	2	Rayven Sample	United States	11.56	
