= Athletics at the 2023 Parapan American Games – Men's 400 metres T11 =

Men's 400 metres T11 at the 2023 Parapan American Games
- Venue: Mario Recordón Athletics Training Center
- Dates: November 22 - November 23
- Competitors: 7 from 4 nations
- Winning time: 52.05

Medalists
1st place, gold medalist(s)		Daniel Silva; Guide: Wendel de Souza	Brazil
2nd place, silver medalist(s)		Enderson Santos; Guide: Eugrid Maza	Venezuela
3rd place, bronze medalist(s)		José de Jesús Flores; Guide: Javier Carrillo	Mexico

The men's T11 400 metres competition of the athletics events at the 2023 Parapan American Games was held on November 22 - 23 at the Mario Recordón Athletics Training Center within the Julio Martínez National Stadium of Santiago, Chile.

== Records ==
Prior to this competition, the existing world and Pan American Games records were as follows:

World record	Daniel Silva (BRA)	49.82	Guadalajara, Mexico	November 18, 2011
Parapan American Games record	Daniel Silva (BRA)	49.82	Guadalajara, Mexico	November 18, 2011
Americas record	Daniel Silva (BRA)	49.82	Guadalajara, Mexico	November 18, 2011

== Schedule ==
Date	Time	Round
November 22, 2023	17:04	Semifinals
November 23, 2023	17:44	Final

== Results ==
All times shown are in seconds.

KEY:	q	Fastest non-qualifiers	Q	Qualified	PR	Parapan Games record	NR	National record	SB	Seasonal best	DQ	Disqualified

=== Semifinals ===
The fastest two athletes of each semifinal advance to the final. The results were as follows:

Rank	Heat	Name	Nationality	Time	Notes
1	2	Daniel Silva; Guide: Wendel de Souza	Brazil	53.22	Q
2	2	Enderson Santos; Guide: Eugrid Maza	Venezuela	54.83	q
3	1	David Brown; Guide: Je'von Hutchison	United States	56.08	Q
4	1	José de Jesús Flores; Guide: Javier Carrillo	Mexico	56.32	q
5	2	Yasser Guzmán; Guide: Cristian Valdez	Mexico	57.70	
6	2	Oscar Sánchez; Guide: Adrian Marquez	Mexico	57.98	
7	1	Felipe Gomes; Guide: Jonas de Lima	Brazil	DNF	

=== Final ===
The results were as follows:

Rank	Lane	Name	Nationality	Time	Notes
1st place, gold medalist(s)	5	Daniel Silva; Guide: Wendel de Souza	Brazil	52.05	
2nd place, silver medalist(s)	7	Enderson Santos; Guide: Eugrid Maza	Venezuela	53.28	
3rd place, bronze medalist(s)	1	José de Jesús Flores; Guide: Javier Carrillo	Mexico	56.35	
4	3	David Brown; Guide: Je'von Hutchison	United States	56.79	
