= Powerlifting at the 2023 Parapan American Games – Men's 107 & +107 kg =

Men's 107 & +107 kg at the 2023 Parapan American Games
- Venue: Chimkowe Gym
- Dates: November 19
- Competitors: 10 from 6 nations

Medalists
1st place, gold medalist(s)		Bobby Body	United States
2nd place, silver medalist(s)		Mateus De Assis	Brazil
3rd place, bronze medalist(s)		José Castillo Castillo	Mexico

The men's 107 & +107 kg competition of the powerlifting events at the 2023 Parapan American Games was held on November 19 at the Chimkowe Gym in Santiago, Chile.

== Results ==
The results were as follows:

Rank	Name	Body weight (kg)	Attempts (kg)				Result (kg)	Score
Rank	Name	Body weight (kg)	1	2	3	4	Result (kg)	Score
1st place, gold medalist(s)	Bobby Body (USA)	102.2	216	223	228	~~229~~	228	136.3
2nd place, silver medalist(s)	Mateus De Assis (BRA)	105.9	207	~~214~~	215		215	126.9
3rd place, bronze medalist(s)	José Castillo Castillo (MEX)	105.5	200	~~207~~	208		208	122.9
4	Freddy Castaneda (COL)	120.3	215	~~217~~	217		217	122.8
5	José Pérez González (VEN)	104.9	207	~~212~~	~~214~~		207	122.5
6	Matías Fenoy (ARG)	105.1	165	169	~~173~~		169	100.0
7	Anthony Gaeta (MEX)	102.7	152	~~160~~	164		164	97.8
8	Miguel Melendez (MEX)	111.6	127	130	131		131	75.3
	Gustavo De Souza (BRA)	131.3	~~235~~	~~235~~	~~238~~		-	
	Eglain Mena (COL)	110.2	~~227~~	~~228~~	~~228~~		-	
