= Puerto Rico at the 2023 Parapan American Games =

- Flag of Puerto Rico
- IPC code: PUR
- NPC: Puerto Rican Paralympic Committee
- Website: www.paralympic.org/puerto-rico

in Santiago, Chile 17 November 2023 – 26 November 2023
- Competitors: 25 in 9 sports
- Flag bearers: Óscar Fontan; Neslie Bernardi
- Medals Ranked 19th: Gold 0 Silver 0 Bronze 1 Total 1

Parapan American Games appearances
- 1999; 2003; 2007; 2011; 2015; 2019; 2023

Puerto Rico competed in the 2023 Parapan American Games in Santiago, Chile from 17 November to 26 November 2023. This was Puerto Rico's seventh appearance at the Parapan American Games, having competed at every edition of the games since the inaugural edition in 1999.

Paralympic taekwondo practitioner Óscar Fontan and powerlifter Neslie Bernardi were the country's flagbearers during the opening ceremony.

== Medalists ==
The following Puerto Rican competitors won medals at the games. In the discipline sections below, the medalists' names are bolded.

Medal	Name	Sport	Event	Date
Bronze	Carmelo Rivera	Athletics	Men's 1500 metres T20	November 21

== Competitors ==
The following is the list of number of competitors (per gender) participating at the games per sport/discipline.

Sport	Men	Women	Total
Archery	1	0	1
Athletics	2	3	5
Judo	1	0	1
Powerlifting	0	1	1
Shooting	1	0	1
Swimming	1	1	2
Taekwondo	1	0	1
Table tennis	2	0	2
Wheelchair basketball	11	0	11
Total	20	5	25

== Archery ==
Men

Athlete	Event	Ranking Round		Round of 16	Quarterfinals	Semifinals	Final / BM	
Athlete	Event	Score	Seed	Opposition Score	Opposition Score	Opposition Score	Opposition Score	Rank
Ricardo Rosario	Individual compound open	644	7	Villavicencio (ECU); **L** 112–130	Did not advance			

== Athletics ==
Key

- Note–Ranks given for track events are within the athlete's heat only
- **Q** = Qualified for the next round
- **q** = Qualified for the next round as a fastest loser
- N/A = Round not applicable for the event
- Bye = Athlete not required to compete in round

Men

Track events

Athlete	Event	Semifinal		Final	
Athlete	Event	Result	Rank	Result	Rank
Erick Colón	100 m T37	—N/a		13.50	6
Erick Colón	200 m T37	—N/a		28.20	7
**Carmelo Rivera**	1500 m T20	—N/a		4:13.36	3rd place, bronze medalist(s)

Women

Track events

Athlete	Event	Semifinal		Final	
Athlete	Event	Result	Rank	Result	Rank
Claudia Vélez	100 m T47	14.12	5	Did not advance	
Yaimillie Díaz	100 m T64	—N/a		13.97	4
Amaris Vazquez	100 m T64	—N/a		14.93	5
Claudia Vélez	200 m T47	29.65	5	Did not advance	
Yaimillie Díaz	200 m T64	—N/a		29.59	4
Amaris Vazquez	200 m T64	—N/a		31.28	5

Field events

Athlete	Event	Final	
Athlete	Event	Distance	Position
Claudia Vélez	Long jump T47	4.12	7
Amaris Vazquez	Long jump T42–T44/T61–T64	4.03	5

== Judo ==
Men

Athlete	Event	Round of 16	Quarterfinals	Semifinals	Repechage 1	Repechage 2	Final / BM	
Athlete	Event	Opposition Result	Opposition Result	Opposition Result	Opposition Result	Opposition Result	Opposition Result	Rank
Luis Pérez	−73 kg	Ferraro (USA); **L** 00S2–01S1	Did not advance					

== Powerlifting ==
Women

Athlete	Event	Total lifted	Rank
Neslie Bernardi	–61 kg	80	4

== Shooting ==
Mixed

Athlete	Event	Qualification		Final	
Athlete	Event	Score	Rank	Score	Rank
Alexander Payne	R3 – 10 m air rifle prone SH1	619.4	8 **Q**	164.8	6

== Swimming ==
Men

Athlete	Event	Heat		Final	
Athlete	Event	Time	Rank	Time	Rank
Javier Hernandez	200 m freestyle S14	2:17.78	8 **Q**	2:16.87	8
Javier Hernandez	100 m backstroke S14	1:14.53	11	Did not advance	
Javier Hernandez	100 m butterfly S14	—N/a		1:04.63	5
Javier Hernandez	200 m individual medley SM14	2:39.40	9	Did not advance	

Women

Athlete	Event	Heat		Final	
Athlete	Event	Time	Rank	Time	Rank
Laura Masso	100 m breaststroke SB9	—N/a		DSQ	7

== Table tennis ==
Men

Athlete	Event	Preliminaries				Round of 16	Quarterfinals	Semifinals	Final / BM	
Athlete	Event	Opposition Result	Opposition Result	Opposition Result	Rank	Opposition Result	Opposition Result	Opposition Result	Opposition Result	Rank
Jeriel López	Singles C9	Carvalho (BRA); **L** 0–3	Skliarsky (ARG); **L** WDR	—N/a	3	Did not advance				
Shaquille Rivera	Singles C9	Syed (CAN); **W** 3–2	Sarmiento (ECU); **W** 3–0	Watson (USA); **L** 0–3	2 **Q**	—N/a	Skliarsky (ARG); **L** WDR	Did not advance		
Jeriel López; Shaquille Rivera	Doubles C18	—N/a				Puerto / Vargas (COL); **L** 1–3	Did not advance			

== Taekwondo ==
Men

Athlete	Event	Round of 16	Quarterfinals	Semifinals	Repechage	Final / BM	
Athlete	Event	Opposition Result	Opposition Result	Opposition Result	Opposition Result	Opposition Result	Rank
Óscar Fontan	−70 kg	Bye	Coelho (BRA); **L** 6–36	Did not advance	Vieira (BRA); **W** 31–5	Bronze medal final Cano (MEX); **L** 20–22	=5

== Wheelchair basketball ==
Summary

Team	Event	Group stage				Quarterfinal	Semifinal	Final / BM	
Team	Event	Opposition Score	Opposition Score	Opposition Score	Rank	Opposition Score	Opposition Score	Opposition Score	Rank
Puerto Rico men's	Men's tournament	Colombia; **L** 53–69	United States; **L** 44–81	Brazil; **L** 36–88	4 **Q**	Canada; **L** 31–88	Did not advance	Seventh place match Chile; **W** 80–54	7

== See also ==
- Puerto Rico at the 2023 Pan American Games
- Puerto Rico at the 2024 Summer Paralympics
