= Athletics at the 2023 Parapan American Games – Men's 5000 metres T11 =

Men's 5000 metres T11 at the 2023 Parapan American Games
- Venue: Mario Recordón Athletics Training Center
- Dates: November 21
- Competitors: 8 from 6 nations
- Winning time: 15:13.10

Medalists
1st place, gold medalist(s)		Yeltsin Jacques; Guide: Edelson De Avila; Guide: Guilherme Dos Anjos	Brazil
2nd place, silver medalist(s)		Rosbil Guillen; Guide: José Luis Rojas	Peru
3rd place, bronze medalist(s)		Júlio Cesar Agripino; Guide: Micael Batista; Guide: Carlos Dos Santos	Brazil

The men's T11 5000 metres competition of the athletics events at the 2023 Parapan American Games was held on November 21 at the Mario Recordón Athletics Training Center within the Julio Martínez National Stadium of Santiago, Chile.

== Records ==
Prior to this competition, the existing world and Pan American Games records were as follows:

World record	Kenya Karasawa (JPN)	14:55.39	Yokohama City, Japan	December 25, 2021
Parapan American Games record	Jason Dunkerley (CAN)	15:39.54	Toronto, Canada	August 10, 2015

== Schedule ==
Date	Time	Round
November 21, 2023	15:09	Final

== Results ==
All times shown are in seconds.

KEY:	q	Fastest non-qualifiers	Q	Qualified	PR	Parapan Games record	NR	National record	SB	Seasonal best	DQ	Disqualified

=== Final ===
The results were as follows:

Rank	Lane	Name	Nationality	Time	Notes
1st place, gold medalist(s)	5	Yeltsin Jacques; Guide: Edelson De Avila; Guide: Guilherme Dos Anjos	Brazil	15:13.10	PR
2nd place, silver medalist(s)	3	Rosbil Guillen; Guide: José Luis Rojas	Peru	15:28.52	
3rd place, bronze medalist(s)	1	Júlio Cesar Agripino; Guide: Micael Batista; Guide: Carlos Dos Santos	Brazil	15:36.71	
4	4	Jimmy Caicedo; Guide: Carlos Arrellano; Guide: Daniel Taramuel	Ecuador	16:18.97	
5	6	Alejandro Pacheco; Guide: Fidel Reyes	Mexico	16:34.46	SB
6	2	Leonardo Villafaña; Guide: Pedro Lemus	Mexico	17:36.29	
7	7	Daniel Davrieux; Guide: Mariano Battaglia	Uruguay	18:08.53	SB
	8	Cristian Valenzuela; Guide: Matías Silva	Chile	DNF	
