= Christian Gabriel Costa =

Brazilian Paralympic athlete (born 2002)

Personal information
- Full name: Christian Gabriel Luiz da Costa
- Born: 10 May 2002 (age 24) Sertãozinho, Brazil

Sport
- Sport: Para-athletics
- Disability class: T37
- Event: Sprints
Medal record
Men's para-athletics
Representing Brazil
Paralympic Games
Bronze medal – third place	2024 Paris	200 m T37
World Championships
Silver medal – second place	2023 Paris	100 m T37
Silver medal – second place	2023 Paris	200 m T37
Silver medal – second place	2025 New Delhi	100 m T37
Parapan American Games
Silver medal – second place	2023 Santiago	100 m T37
Silver medal – second place	2023 Santiago	200 m T37

Christian Gabriel Luiz da Costa (born 10 May 2002) is a Brazilian T37 Paralympic sprint runner.

== Career ==
He represented Brazil at the 2024 Summer Paralympics and won a bronze medal in the 100 metres T37 event. He competed at the 2025 World Para Athletics Championships and won a silver medal in the 100 metres T37 event.
