= Tiago Ferreira (swimmer) =

Brazilian para swimmer

Personal information
- Full name: Tiago de Oliveira Ferreira
- Nationality: Brazilian

Sport
- Sport: Para swimming
- Disability class: S5, SM5
Medal record
Men's para swimming
Representing Brazil
World Championships
| Gold medal – first place | 2025 Singapore | Mixed 4×50 m medley relay 20pts |
| Silver medal – second place | 2022 Madeira | 200 m medley SM5 |
| Silver medal – second place | 2025 Singapore | Mixed 4×50 m freestyle relay 20pts |
Parapan American Games
| Gold medal – first place | 2023 Santiago | Mixed 4×50 m freestyle relay 20pts |
| Silver medal – second place | 2023 Santiago | 50 m freestyle S5 |
| Silver medal – second place | 2023 Santiago | 100 m freestyle S5 |
| Silver medal – second place | 2023 Santiago | 50 m butterfly S5 |
| Bronze medal – third place | 2023 Santiago | 50 m backstroke S5 |

Tiago de Oliveira Ferreira is a Brazilian para swimmer.

== Career ==
In September 2025, Ferreira competed at the 2025 World Para Swimming Championships. He won a gold medal in the mixed 4 × 50 m medley relay 20 pts and a silver medal in the mixed 4 × 50m freestyle relay 20 pts events.
