= United States at the 2023 Parapan American Games =

- Flag of the United States
- IPC code: USA
- NPC: United States Paralympic Committee
- Website: www.paralympic.org/united-states-america

in Santiago, Chile November 17, 2023 – November 26, 2023
- Competitors: 240 (148 men and 92 women) in 16 sports
- Flag bearers: Ben Goodrich; Dana Mathewson
- Medals Ranked 2nd: Gold 55 Silver 58 Bronze 53 Total 166

Parapan American Games appearances (overview)
- 1999; 2003; 2007; 2011; 2015; 2019; 2023

The United States is scheduled to compete in the 2023 Parapan American Games in Santiago, Chile from November 17 to 26, 2023. The United States will be represented by 240 competitors in 16 sports at the 2023 games.

Paralympic judoka Ben Goodrich and wheelchair tennis player Dana Mathewson were the country's flagbearers during the opening ceremony.

== Medalists ==
The following U.S. competitors won medals at the games. In the discipline sections below, the medalists' names are bolded.

Medal	Name	Sport	Event	Date
Gold	Yanxiao Gong	Shooting	P3 Mixed 25 metre pistol SH1	November 18
Gold	Jenson Van Emburgh	Table tennis	Men's singles C3	November 18
Gold	Ian Seidenfeld	Table tennis	Men's singles C6	November 18
Gold	Tahl Leibovitz	Table tennis	Men's singles C9	November 18
Gold	Eric Ryan Pinney	Cycling	Men's road time trial H1–5	November 19
Gold	Samantha Bosco	Cycling	Women's road time trial C1–5	November 19
Gold	Katerina Brim	Cycling	Women's road time trial H1–5	November 19
Gold	Dennis Connors	Cycling	Mixed road time trial T1–2	November 19
Gold	Bobby Body	Powerlifting	Men's 107 & +107 kg	November 19
Gold	Marco De La Rosa	Shooting	P1 Men's 10 metre air pistol SH1	November 19
Gold	Cali Prochaska	Swimming	Women's 200 metre individual medley SM9	November 19
Gold	Taylor Winnett	Swimming	Women's 200 metre individual medley SM10	November 19
Gold	Stetson Bardfield	Shooting	R5 Mixed 10 metre air rifle prone SH2	November 20
Gold	Cali Prochaska	Swimming	Women's 100 metre butterfly S9	November 20
Gold	Megan Gioffreda	Swimming	Women's 200 metre individual medley SM6	November 20
Gold	Kevin Polish; Wendy Gardner	Archery	Mixed team compound open	November 21
Gold	Eric Bennett; Candice Caesar	Archery	Mixed team recurve open	November 21
Gold	Ryan Medrano	Athletics	Men's 400 metres T38	November 21
Gold	Leo Merle	Athletics	Men's 1500 metres T38	November 21
Gold	Evan Correll	Athletics	Men's 5000 metres T54	November 21
Gold	Hannah Dederick	Athletics	Women's 400 metres T53/T54	November 21
Gold	Kevin Polish	Archery	Men's individual compound open	November 22
Gold	Tracy Otto	Archery	Women's individual W1	November 22
Gold	Ryan Medrano	Athletics	Men's 100 metres T38	November 22
Gold	Josh Cinnamo	Athletics	Men's shot put F46	November 22
Gold	Brianna Salinaro	Athletics	Women's 200 metres T35	November 22
Gold	Sydney Barta	Athletics	Women's 200 metres T64	November 22
Gold	Evan Austin	Swimming	Men's 50 metre butterfly S7	November 22
Gold	Keegan Knott	Swimming	Women's 400 metre freestyle S9	November 22
Gold	Taylor Winnett	Swimming	Women's 100 metre butterfly S10	November 22
Gold	Hannah Chadwick-Dias	Cycling	Women's individual pursuit B	November 23
Gold	Haven Shepherd	Swimming	Women's 200 metre individual medley SM8	November 23
Gold	United States national wheelchair rugby team: Travis Baker; Chuck Aoki; Jeff Butler; Sarah Adam; Eric Newby; Lee Fredette; Josh O'Neill; Clayton Brackett; Brad Hudspeth; Christopher Fleace; Zion Redington; Mason Symons	Wheelchair rugby	Mixed tournament	November 23
Gold	Dana Mathewson; Maylee Phelps	Wheelchair tennis	Women's doubles	November 23
Gold	Joel Gomez	Athletics	Men's 1500 metres T13	November 24
Gold	Hannah Dederick	Athletics	Women's 1500 metres T54	November 24
Gold	Beatriz Hatz	Athletics	Women's long jump T42–T44/T61–T64	November 24
Gold	Miles Krajewski; Jayci Simon	Badminton	Mixed doubles SH6	November 24
Gold	Michael Stephens	Cycling	Men's individual time trial B	November 24
Gold	Samantha Bosco	Cycling	Women's individual pursuit C4–5	November 24
Gold	Hannah Chadwick-Dias	Cycling	Women's individual time trial B	November 24
Gold	Yaseen El-Demerdash	Swimming	Men's 100 metre backstroke S10	November 24
Gold	Taylor Winnett	Swimming	Women's 100 metre backstroke S10	November 24
Gold	Madelyn White	Swimming	Women's 100 metre breaststroke SB8	November 24
Gold	United States women's national wheelchair basketball team: Abigail Bauleke; Josephine Dehart; Josie Aslakson; Natalie Schneider; Rebecca Murray; Rose Hollermann; Kaitlyn Eaton; Lindsey Zurbrugg; Emily Oberst; Bailey Moody; Ixhelt González; Courtney Ryan	Wheelchair basketball	Women's tournament	November 24
Gold	Dana Mathewson	Wheelchair tennis	Women's singles	November 24
Gold	Miguel Jimenez-Vergara	Athletics	Men's 1500 metres T54	November 25
Gold	Tyson Gunter	Athletics	Men's long jump T13	November 25
Gold	Brianna Salinaro	Athletics	Women's 100 metres T35	November 25
Gold	Hannah Dederick	Athletics	Women's 100 metres T54	November 25
Gold	Beatriz Hatz	Athletics	Women's 100 metres T64	November 25
Gold	Evan Medell	Taekwondo	Men's +80 kg	November 25
Gold	United States men's national wheelchair basketball team: Jorge Sánchez; Jacob Williams; Talen Jourdan; Brian Bell; Steven Serio; Trevon Jenifer; AJ Fitzpatrick; Jorge Salazar; Peter Berry; Fabian Romo; John Boie; Jeromie Meyer	Wheelchair basketball	Men's tournament	November 25
Gold	Miles Krajewski	Badminton	Men's singles SH6	November 26
Gold	Alfredo de los Santos	Cycling	Men's road race H3–5	November 26
Gold	Dennis Connors	Cycling	Mixed road race T1–2	November 26
Silver	Marco De La Rosa	Shooting	P3 Mixed 25 metre pistol SH1	November 18
Silver	Evan Wilkerson	Swimming	Men's 100 metre backstroke S12	November 18
Silver	Taylor Winnett	Swimming	Women's 100 metre breaststroke SB9	November 18
Silver	Brandon Lyons	Cycling	Men's road time trial H1–5	November 19
Silver	Jamie Whitmore	Cycling	Women's road time trial C1–5	November 19
Silver	Maria Liana Mutia	Judo	Women's 57 kg	November 19
Silver	Jack O'Neil	Swimming	Men's 100 metre backstroke S8	November 19
Silver	Adin Williams	Swimming	Men's 400 metre freestyle S7	November 19
Silver	David Gelfand	Swimming	Men's 200 metre individual medley SM9	November 19
Silver	Keegan Knott	Swimming	Women's 200 metre individual medley SM9	November 19
Silver	Taylor Winnett	Swimming	Women's 400 metre freestyle S10	November 20
Silver	Tahmar Upshaw	Athletics	Men's 400 metres T47	November 21
Silver	Noah Scherf	Athletics	Men's 5000 metres T13	November 21
Silver	Miguel Jimenez-Vergara	Athletics	Men's 5000 metres T54	November 21
Silver	William Rankine	Swimming	Men's 100 metre breaststroke SB12	November 21
Silver	McKenzie Coan	Swimming	Women's 100 metre backstroke S7	November 21
Silver	Jason Tabansky	Archery	Men's individual W1	November 22
Silver	Eric Bennett	Archery	Men's individual recurve open	November 22
Silver	Miguel Jimenez-Vergara	Athletics	Men's 800 metres T53/T54	November 22
Silver	Tahmar Upshaw	Athletics	Men's 1500 metres T46	November 22
Silver	Devin Huhta	Athletics	Men's shot put F12	November 22
Silver	Justin Phongsavanh	Athletics	Men's javelin throw F54	November 22
Silver	Delaney Nolin	Athletics	Women's 200 metres T35	November 22
Silver	Beatriz Hatz	Athletics	Women's 200 metres T64	November 22
Silver	Megan Gioffreda	Swimming	Women's 50 metre freestyle S6	November 22
Silver	Grace Nuhfer	Swimming	Women's 50 metre freestyle S13	November 22
Silver	Cali Prochaska	Swimming	Women's 400 metre freestyle S9	November 22
Silver	Mikaela Jenkins	Swimming	Women's 100 metre butterfly S10	November 22
Silver	Emmett Martin; Jack O'Neil; McKenzie Coan; Taylor Winnett	Swimming	Mixed 4 × 100 metre medley relay 34 points	November 22
Silver	Phillip Croft	Athletics	Men's 400 metres T53	November 23
Silver	Taylor Swanson	Athletics	Women's 200 metres T37	November 23
Silver	Hannah Dederick	Athletics	Women's 800 metres T53/T54	November 23
Silver	Christina Gardner	Athletics	Women's shot put F57	November 23
Silver	Yaseen El-Demerdash	Swimming	Men's 100 metre freestyle S10	November 23
Silver	Zachary Shattuck	Swimming	Men's 100 metre breaststroke SB6	November 23
Silver	Taylor Winnett	Swimming	Women's 100 metre freestyle S10	November 23
Silver	Maria Francescotti	Swimming	Women's 100 metre backstroke S9	November 23
Silver	Robert Hunt	Athletics	Men's 100 metres T53	November 24
Silver	Jonathan Gore	Athletics	Men's 100 metres T64	November 24
Silver	Max Rohn	Athletics	Men's discus throw F64	November 24
Silver	Taylor Swanson	Athletics	Women's 100 metres T37	November 24
Silver	Beth Grauer	Athletics	Women's shot put F32/F33/F34	November 24
Silver	Jamie Whitmore	Cycling	Women's individual pursuit C1–3	November 24
Silver	United States men's national goalball team: Walter Merren; Mikael Faison; Zachary Buhler; Russell Young; Hayden Simpson; Caleb Christian	Goalball	Men's tournament	November 24
Silver	United States women's national goalball team: Alessandra Lawson; Lisa Czechowski; Asya Miller; Amanda Dennis; Eliana Mason; Mindy Cook	Goalball	Women's tournament	November 24
Silver	McKenzie Coan	Swimming	Women's 100 metre freestyle S7	November 24
Silver	Natalie Sims	Swimming	Women's 100 metre freestyle S9	November 24
Silver	Chloe Cederholm	Swimming	Women's 100 metre backstroke S10	November 24
Silver	Yaseen El-Demerdash; Jack O'Neil; McKenzie Coan; Natalie Sims	Swimming	Mixed 4 × 100 metre freestyle relay 34 points	November 24
Silver	Chelsea Stein	Athletics	Women's 100 metres T53	November 25
Silver	Sydney Barta	Athletics	Women's 100 metres T64	November 25
Silver	Catarina Guimarães	Athletics	Women's long jump T36/T37/T38	November 25
Silver	Jessica Heims	Athletics	Women's discus throw F64	November 25
Silver	Jayci Simon	Badminton	Women's singles SH6	November 26
Silver	Eric Ryan Pinney	Cycling	Men's road race H3–5	November 26
Silver	Jamie Whitmore	Cycling	Women's road race C1–3	November 26
Silver	Katerina Brim	Cycling	Women's road race H2–5	November 26
Bronze	Michael Tagliapietra	Shooting	P3 Mixed 25 metre pistol SH1	November 18
Bronze	Abbas Karimi	Swimming	Men's 50 metre freestyle S5	November 18
Bronze	Yaseen El-Demerdash	Swimming	Men's 50 metre freestyle S10	November 18
Bronze	McKenzie Coan	Swimming	Women's 400 metre freestyle S8	November 18
Bronze	Megan Gioffreda	Swimming	Women's 100 metre backstroke S6	November 18
Bronze	Sarah Bofinger	Swimming	Women's 100 metre breaststroke SB9	November 18
Bronze	Mallory Weggemann	Swimming	Women's 200 metre individual medley SM7	November 18
Bronze	Logan Watson	Table tennis	Men's singles C9	November 18
Bronze	Jenna Rollman	Cycling	Women's road time trial H1–5	November 19
Bronze	Yanxiao Gong	Shooting	P1 Men's 10 metre air pistol SH1	November 19
Bronze	Chloe Cederholm	Swimming	Women's 200 metre individual medley SM10	November 19
Bronze	Ben Goodrich	Judo	Men's 90 kg	November 20
Bronze	Richard Ties	Judo	Men's 90 kg	November 20
Bronze	Katie Davis	Judo	Women's +70 kg	November 20
Bronze	Abbas Karimi	Swimming	Men's 50 metre butterfly S5	November 20
Bronze	David Gelfand	Swimming	Men's 100 metre butterfly S9	November 20
Bronze	Mikaela Jenkins	Swimming	Women's 400 metre freestyle S10	November 20
Bronze	Marco Makkar; Ian Seidenfeld	Table tennis	Men's doubles C14	November 20
Bronze	Tahl Leibovitz; Logan Watson	Table tennis	Men's doubles C18	November 20
Bronze	Jenson Van Emburgh; Pamela Fontaine	Table tennis	Mixed doubles C4–7	November 20
Bronze	Rayven Sample	Athletics	Men's 400 metres T47	November 21
Bronze	Phillip Croft	Athletics	Men's 5000 metres T54	November 21
Bronze	Kevin Nguyen	Shooting	R6 Mixed 50 metre rifle prone SH1	November 21
Bronze	Evan Wilkerson	Swimming	Men's 100 metre breaststroke SB12	November 21
Bronze	Wendy Gardner	Archery	Women's individual compound open	November 22
Bronze	Candice Caesar	Archery	Women's individual recurve open	November 22
Bronze	Catherine Carey	Athletics	Women's 200 metres T64	November 22
Bronze	McKenzie Coan	Swimming	Women's 50 metre freestyle S8	November 22
Bronze	Madelyn White	Swimming	Women's 400 metre freestyle S9	November 22
Bronze	Stirley Jones Jr.	Athletics	Men's 100 metres T13	November 23
Bronze	Robert Hunt	Athletics	Men's 400 metres T53	November 23
Bronze	Evan Correll	Athletics	Men's 400 metres T54	November 23
Bronze	Catarina Guimarães	Athletics	Women's 100 metres T38	November 23
Bronze	Keegan Knott	Swimming	Women's 100 metre backstroke S9	November 23
Bronze	Phillip Croft	Athletics	Men's 100 metres T53	November 24
Bronze	Evan Correll	Athletics	Men's 100 metres T54	November 24
Bronze	Zachary Blair	Athletics	Men's 100 metres T64	November 24
Bronze	Catherine Carey	Athletics	Women's long jump T42–T44/T61–T64	November 24
Bronze	Noah Busch	Swimming	Men's 50 metre freestyle S9	November 24
Bronze	Zachary Shattuck	Swimming	Men's 50 metre butterfly S6	November 24
Bronze	Trevor Lukacsko	Swimming	Men's 100 metre butterfly S14	November 24
Bronze	William Rankine	Swimming	Men's 200 metre individual medley SM13	November 24
Bronze	Cali Prochaska	Swimming	Women's 100 metre breaststroke SB8	November 24
Bronze	Antoine Craig	Athletics	Men's 100 metres T11	November 25
Bronze	Delaney Nolin	Athletics	Women's 100 metres T35	November 25
Bronze	Catherine Carey	Athletics	Women's 100 metres T64	November 25
Bronze	Alicia Guerrero	Athletics	Women's discus throw F64	November 25
Bronze	David Brown; Ryan Medrano; Hannah Dederick; Beatriz Hatz	Athletics	Universal 4 × 100 metre relay	November 25
Bronze	United States national cerebral palsy football team: Sean Boyle; Francis Lowery Jr.; Jacob Crumbley; Wesley Pricinse; Jacob Kaplan; John Sulivan; Adam Ballou; Andrew Bremer; Cameron DeLillo; Benjamin Lindau; Kevin McCandlish III; Marc Estrella; Josh Brunais; Shea Hammond	Football 7-a-side	Men's tournament	November 25
Bronze	Andrew Bogdanov; David Wagner	Wheelchair tennis	Quad doubles	November 25
Bronze	Brandon Lyons	Cycling	Men's road race H3–5	November 26
Bronze	Samantha Bosco	Cycling	Women's road race C4–5	November 26
Bronze	Jenna Rollman	Cycling	Women's road race H2–5	November 26

Medals by sport/discipline
Sport	1st place, gold medalist(s)	2nd place, silver medalist(s)	3rd place, bronze medalist(s)	Total
Athletics	16	22	16	**54**
Swimming	11	22	19	**52**
Cycling	9	7	4	**20**
Archery	4	2	2	**8**
Shooting	3	1	3	**7**
Table tennis	3	0	4	**7**
Badminton	2	1	0	**3**
Wheelchair tennis	2	0	1	**3**
Wheelchair basketball	2	0	0	**2**
Powerlifting	1	0	0	**1**
Taekwondo	1	0	0	**1**
Wheelchair rugby	1	0	0	**1**
Goalball	0	2	0	**2**
Judo	0	1	3	**4**
Football 7-a-side	0	0	1	**1**
**Total**	**55**	**58**	**53**	**166**

Medals by day
Day	1st place, gold medalist(s)	2nd place, silver medalist(s)	3rd place, bronze medalist(s)	Total
18 November	4	3	8	15
19 November	8	7	3	18
20 November	3	1	9	13
21 November	6	5	4	15
22 November	9	13	5	27
23 November	4	8	5	17
24 November	12	12	9	33
25 November	7	4	7	18
26 November	3	4	3	10
**Total**	**55**	**58**	**53**	**166**

Medals by gender
**Gender**	1st place, gold medalist(s)	2nd place, silver medalist(s)	3rd place, bronze medalist(s)	**Total**
Male	22	23	26	71
Female	26	31	22	79
Mixed	7	4	5	16
**Total**	**55**	**58**	**53**	**166**

== Competitors ==
The following is the list of number of competitors (per gender) participating at the games per sport/discipline.

Sport	Men	Women	Total
Archery	4	5	9
Athletics	35	25	60
Badminton	2	2	4
Boccia	1	2	3
Cycling	8	7	15
Goalball	6	6	12
Judo	5	3	8
Powerlifting	6	1	7
Shooting	8	2	10
Football 7-a-side	14	—N/a	14
Swimming	16	20	36
Table tennis	11	2	13
Taekwondo	4	0	4
Wheelchair basketball	12	12	24
Wheelchair rugby	11	1	12
Wheelchair tennis	4	2	6
Total	148	92	240

== Archery ==
Men

Athlete	Event	Ranking Round		Round of 16	Quarterfinals	Semifinals	Final / BM	
Athlete	Event	Score	Seed	Opposition Score	Opposition Score	Opposition Score	Opposition Score	Rank
Lucas Herro	Individual W1	570	4	—N/a		Tabansky (USA); L 123–132	Bronze medal final Saiz (CHI); L 111–115	4
Jason Tabansky	Individual W1	640	1	—N/a		Herro (USA); W 132–123	Franco (BRA); L 123–135	2nd place, silver medalist(s)
Kevin Polish	Individual compound open	699	1	Bye	Parada (VEN); W 148–134	Sardina (MEX); W 145–143	Quesada (CRC); W 145–142	1st place, gold medalist(s)
Eric Bennett	Individual recurve open	628	2	Bye	Aguirre (CHI); W 6–2	Ramirez (COL); W 6–0	Molina (MEX); L 2–6	2nd place, silver medalist(s)

Women

Athlete	Event	Ranking Round		Round of 16	Quarterfinals	Semifinals	Final / BM	
Athlete	Event	Score	Seed	Opposition Score	Opposition Score	Opposition Score	Opposition Score	Rank
Tracy Otto	Individual W1	556	1	—N/a		Bye	López (CHI); W 101–83	1st place, gold medalist(s)
Wendy Gardner	Individual compound open	638	5	Bye	Gonzabay (ECU); W 138–137	Zúñiga (CHI); L 137–141	Bronze medal final Peñaranda (COL); W 140–139	3rd place, bronze medalist(s)
Teresa Wallace	Individual compound open	620	8	Martinez (PER); W 131–117	Zúñiga (CHI); L 127–141	Did not advance		
Allison Brown	Individual recurve open	444	5	—N/a	Caesar (USA); L 0–6	Did not advance		
Candice Caesar	Individual recurve open	454	4	—N/a	Brown (USA); W 6–0	Daza (COL); L 2–6	Bronze medal final Rocha (MEX); W 6–4	3rd place, bronze medalist(s)

Mixed

Athlete	Event	Ranking Round		Quarterfinals	Semifinals	Final / BM	
Athlete	Event	Score	Seed	Opposition Score	Opposition Score	Opposition Score	Rank
Kevin Polish; Wendy Gardner	Team compound open	1337	1	Bye	Brazil; W 151–144	Ecuador; W 148–143	1st place, gold medalist(s)
Eric Bennett; Candice Caesar	Team recurve open	1082	3	Argentina; W 6–0	Mexico; W 5–1	Colombia; W 6–2	1st place, gold medalist(s)

== Athletics ==
Key

- Note–Ranks given for track events are within the athlete's heat only
- Q = Qualified for the next round
- q = Qualified for the next round as a fastest loser
- N/A = Round not applicable for the event
- Bye = Athlete not required to compete in round

Men

Track events

Athlete	Event	Semifinal		Final	
Athlete	Event	Result	Rank	Result	Rank
David Brown	100 m T11	11.83	2 q	11.97	4
Antoine Craig	100 m T11	11.39	1 Q	11.56	3rd place, bronze medalist(s)
Stirley Jones Jr.	100 m T13	—N/a		11.39	3rd place, bronze medalist(s)
Markeith Price	100 m T13	—N/a		DNS	
Matthew Paintin	100 m T35	13.35	3 Q	13.44	7
Austin Spalla	100 m T35	13.39	4 q	13.32	6
Marshall Zackery	100 m T35	12.96	3 Q	12.81	4
Conner Pierce	100 m T36	—N/a		14.48	7
Ryan Medrano	100 m T38	—N/a		11.20	1st place, gold medalist(s)
Rayven Sample	100 m T47	11.49	5 q	11.56	8
Tanner Wright	100 m T47	10.98	3 Q	10.91	4
Nicholas McCoy	100 m T52	—N/a		19.22	5
Phillip Croft	100 m T53	—N/a		15.79	3rd place, bronze medalist(s)
Robert Hunt	100 m T53	—N/a		15.43	2nd place, silver medalist(s)
Valera Allen	100 m T54	15.71	4	Did not advance	
Evan Correll	100 m T54	14.86	3 Q	14.54	3rd place, bronze medalist(s)
Miguel Jimenez-Vergara	100 m T54	15.67	3 Q	15.44	8
Zachary Blair	100 m T64	—N/a		11.81	3rd place, bronze medalist(s)
Jonathan Gore	100 m T64	—N/a		11.26	2nd place, silver medalist(s)
Matthew Paintin	200 m T35	27.29	2 Q	27.46	5
Austin Spalla	200 m T35	27.85	3 Q	27.84	7
Marshall Zackery	200 m T35	26.63	3 Q	27.00	4
Jonathan Gore	200 m T64	—N/a		24.49	4
David Brown	400 m T11	56.08	1 Q	56.79	4
Caleb Howard	400 m T13	—N/a		54.93	5
Conner Pierce	400 m T36	—N/a		1:10.26	6
Simon Detmer	400 m T37	—N/a		1:04.09	5
Ryan Medrano	400 m T38	—N/a		51.14	1st place, gold medalist(s)
Rayven Sample	400 m T47	—N/a		50.68	3rd place, bronze medalist(s)
Tahmar Upshaw	400 m T47	—N/a		50.67	2nd place, silver medalist(s)
Nicholas McCoy	400 m T52	—N/a		1:04.10	5
Phillip Croft	400 m T53	—N/a		52.23	2nd place, silver medalist(s)
Robert Hunt	400 m T53	—N/a		52.48	3rd place, bronze medalist(s)
Evan Correll	400 m T54	48.57	2 Q	48.05	3rd place, bronze medalist(s)
Miguel Jimenez-Vergara	400 m T54	49.14	2 Q	48.93	5
Jason Robinson	400 m T54	54.32	5	Did not advance	
Evan Correll	800 m T53/T54	1:39.96	1 Q	1:37.71	4
Phillip Croft	800 m T53/T54	1:45.81	4 q	1:41.40	7
Miguel Jimenez-Vergara	800 m T53/T54	1:38.12	2 Q	1:36.53	2nd place, silver medalist(s)
Jason Robinson	800 m T53/T54	1:48.36	5	Did not advance	
Joel Gomez	1500 m T13	—N/a		3:56.24	1st place, gold medalist(s)
Caleb Howard	1500 m T13	—N/a		4:36.39	5
Noah Scherf	1500 m T13	—N/a		4:21.35	4
Leo Merle	1500 m T38	—N/a		4:12.62	1st place, gold medalist(s)
Tahmar Upshaw	1500 m T46	—N/a		4:12.96	2nd place, silver medalist(s)
Evan Correll	1500 m T54	—N/a		3:10.32	4
Phillip Croft	1500 m T54	—N/a		3:10.63	5
Miguel Jimenez-Vergara	1500 m T54	—N/a		3:09.69	1st place, gold medalist(s)
Caleb Howard	5000 m T13	—N/a		18:10.92	4
Noah Scherf	5000 m T13	—N/a		16:17.00	2nd place, silver medalist(s)
Evan Correll	5000 m T54	—N/a		11:05.75	1st place, gold medalist(s)
Phillip Croft	5000 m T54	—N/a		11:26.86	3rd place, bronze medalist(s)
Miguel Jimenez-Vergara	5000 m T54	—N/a		11:06.73	2nd place, silver medalist(s)

Field events

Athlete	Event	Final	
Athlete	Event	Distance	Position
Tyson Gunter	Long jump T13	6.58	1st place, gold medalist(s)
Justin Philip Caine	Long jump T36	4.44	5
Simon Detmer	Long jump T37/T38	4.36	7
Ryan Medrano	Long jump T37/T38	6.01	4
Tanner Wright	Long jump T47	6.39	5
Devin Huhta	Shot put F12	13.68	2nd place, silver medalist(s)
Josh Cinnamo	Shot put F46	14.93	1st place, gold medalist(s)
Shahrad Nasajpour	Discus throw F37	45.65	4
Max Rohn	Discus throw F64	52.31	2nd place, silver medalist(s)
Markeith Price	Javelin throw F13	29.56	3
Cody Michael Jones	Javelin throw F37/F38	41.78	4
Justin Phongsavanh	Javelin throw F54	29.41	2nd place, silver medalist(s)

Women

Track events

Athlete	Event	Semifinal		Final	
Athlete	Event	Result	Rank	Result	Rank
Delaney Nolin	100 m T35	—N/a		17.32	3rd place, bronze medalist(s)
Brianna Salinaro	100 m T35	—N/a		15.90	1st place, gold medalist(s)
Michelle Cross	100 m T37	—N/a		14.86	5
Taylor Swanson	100 m T37	—N/a		13.01	2nd place, silver medalist(s)
Catarina Guimarães	100 m T38	14.12	2 Q	14.07	3rd place, bronze medalist(s)
Jordan McGuire	100 m T38	16.55	5	Did not advance	
Chelsea Stein	100 m T53	—N/a		18.55	2nd place, silver medalist(s)
Hannah Dederick	100 m T54	—N/a		16.19	1st place, gold medalist(s)
Sydney Barta	100 m T64	—N/a		13.48	2nd place, silver medalist(s)
Catherine Carey	100 m T64	—N/a		13.89	3rd place, bronze medalist(s)
Beatriz Hatz	100 m T64	—N/a		13.41	1st place, gold medalist(s)
Taylor Talbot	200 m T12	28.49	3	Did not advance	
Delaney Nolin	200 m T35	—N/a		35.98	2nd place, silver medalist(s)
Brianna Salinaro	200 m T35	—N/a		34.67	1st place, gold medalist(s)
Michelle Cross	200 m T37	—N/a		30.81	5
Janie Rae Richardson	200 m T37	—N/a		33.59	7
Taylor Swanson	200 m T37	—N/a		27.31	2nd place, silver medalist(s)
Emily Marie Lopez	200 m T47	28.76	4 q	28.62	7
Sydney Barta	200 m T64	—N/a		27.45	1st place, gold medalist(s)
Catherine Carey	200 m T64	—N/a		28.72	3rd place, bronze medalist(s)
Beatriz Hatz	200 m T64	—N/a		27.86	2nd place, silver medalist(s)
Madison Hahs	400 m T38	1:22.52	4 q	1:22.18	8
Janie Rae Richardson	400 m T38	1:22.55	5	Did not advance	
Emily Marie Lopez	400 m T47	1:06.07	4	Did not advance	
Hannah Dederick	400 m T53/T54	—N/a		55.04	1st place, gold medalist(s)
Chelsea Stein	400 m T53/T54	—N/a		1:03.77	6
Hannah Dederick	800 m T53/T54	—N/a		1:49.81	2nd place, silver medalist(s)
Chelsea Stein	800 m T53/T54	—N/a		2:08.33	5
Hannah Dederick	1500 m T54	—N/a		3:45.12	1st place, gold medalist(s)
Chelsea Stein	1500 m T54	—N/a		4:10.86	4

Field events

Athlete	Event	Final	
Athlete	Event	Distance	Position
Catarina Guimarães	Long jump T36/T37/T38	4.40	2nd place, silver medalist(s)
Madison Hahs	Long jump T36/T37/T38	3.19	4
Emily Marie Lopez	Long jump T47	4.65	6
Catherine Carey	Long jump T42–T44/T61–T64	4.55	3rd place, bronze medalist(s)
Beatriz Hatz	Long jump T42–T44/T61–T64	5.09	1st place, gold medalist(s)
Lacey Jai Henderson	Long jump T42–T44/T61–T64	3.54	4
Beth Grauer	Shot put F32/F33/F34	7.20	2nd place, silver medalist(s)
Margaret Beaudoin	Shot put F35/F36/F37	6.36	8
Kasey Nickel	Shot put F35/F36/F37	8.76	5
Janie Rae Richardson	Shot put F35/F36/F37	7.05	7
Christina Gardner	Shot put F57	9.34	2nd place, silver medalist(s)
Margaret Beaudoin	Discus throw F38	16.40	10
Madison Hahs	Discus throw F38	17.02	9
Kasey Nickel	Discus throw F38	21.67	7
Christina Gardner	Discus throw F57	22.72	4
Chloe Lynn Chavez	Discus throw F64	25.65	5
Alicia Guerrero	Discus throw F64	29.01	3rd place, bronze medalist(s)
Jessica Heims	Discus throw F64	35.37	2nd place, silver medalist(s)
Danielle Amanda Kanas	Javelin throw F46	25.78	4

Universal

Track events

Athlete	Event	Semifinal		Final	
Athlete	Event	Result	Rank	Result	Rank
David Brown; Ryan Medrano; Hannah Dederick; Beatriz Hatz	4 × 100 m relay	Bye		48.90	3rd place, bronze medalist(s)

== Badminton ==
Men

Athlete	Event	Preliminaries				Quarterfinals	Semifinals	Final / BM	
Athlete	Event	Opposition Result	Opposition Result	Opposition Result	Rank	Opposition Result	Opposition Result	Opposition Result	Rank
Richard Alcaraz	Singles SL4	De La Cruz (DOM); L 23–21, 14–21, 13–21	Johann (BRA); L 10–21, 12–21	—N/a	3	Did not advance			
Miles Krajewski	Singles SH6	Lightfoot (CAN); W 21–6, 21–10	Coloma (CHI); W 21–5, 21–6	Mattos (ARG); W 21–8, 21–2	1 Q	Bye	Quispe (PER); W 21–6, 21–19	Tavares (BRA); W 21–19, 21–15	1st place, gold medalist(s)

Women

Athlete	Event	Preliminaries				Semifinals	Final / BM	
Athlete	Event	Opposition Result	Opposition Result	Opposition Result	Rank	Opposition Result	Opposition Result	Rank
Amy Laura Burnett	Singles WH1	Souza (BRA); L 9–21, 5–21	Clarke (BAR); W 21–7, 21–3	—N/a	2 Q	Souza (BRA); L 3–21, 5–21	Bronze medal final Chokyu (CAN); L 5–21, 5–21	4
Jayci Simon	Singles SH6	Loyola (ARG); W 21–10, 21–8	Fernández (PER); W 23–21, 21–16	Reis (BRA); W 21–3, 21–4	1 Q	Fernández (PER); W 21–10, 21–14	Póveda (PER); L 10–21, 11–21	2nd place, silver medalist(s)

Mixed

Athlete	Event	Preliminaries				
Athlete	Event	Opposition Result	Opposition Result	Opposition Result	Opposition Result	Rank
Miles Krajewski; Jayci Simon	Doubles SH6	Mattos / Loyola (ARG); W 21–4, 21–4	Quispe / Póveda (PER); W 21–18, 21–12	Kendrick / Cloëtta (CAN); W 21–5, 21–7	Salva / Fernández (PER); W 21–10, 21–2	1st place, gold medalist(s)

== Boccia ==
Men

Athlete	Event	Pool matches			Quarterfinals	Semifinals	Final / BM	
Athlete	Event	Opposition Score	Opposition Score	Rank	Opposition Score	Opposition Score	Opposition Score	Rank
Nick Taylor	Individual BC4	Arellano (CHI); W 8–2	Chica (COL); L 3–8	2 Q	Ciobanu (CAN); L 2–5	Did not advance		

Women

Athlete	Event	Pool matches				Quarterfinals	Semifinals	Final / BM	
Athlete	Event	Opposition Score	Opposition Score	Opposition Score	Rank	Opposition Score	Opposition Score	Opposition Score	Rank
Michele Lynch	Individual BC2	Duarte (ESA); L 2–7	León (ECU); L 2–4	—N/a	3	Did not advance			
Natalie Chastain	Individual BC3	Guérette (CAN); L 2–6	Oliveira (BRA); L 0–14	Pancca (PER); L 1–9	4	Did not advance			

== Cycling ==
=== Road ===
Men

Athlete	Event	Result	Rank
Joseph Berenyi	Time trial C1–5	29:19.37	9
Alfredo de los Santos	Time trial H1–5	33:32.59	6
Brandon Lyons	Time trial H1–5	31:38.33	2nd place, silver medalist(s)
Eric Ryan Pinney	Time trial H1–5	31:19.05	1st place, gold medalist(s)
Alfredo de los Santos	Road race H3–5	1:42:53	1st place, gold medalist(s)
Brandon Lyons	Road race H3–5	1:42:54	3rd place, bronze medalist(s)
Eric Ryan Pinney	Road race H3–5	1:42:53	2nd place, silver medalist(s)

Women

Athlete	Event	Result	Rank
Hannah Chadwick-Dias	Time trial B	DNS	
Samantha Bosco	Time trial C1–5	15:08.01	1st place, gold medalist(s)
Elizabeth Neag	Time trial C1–5	16:21.86	6
Jamie Whitmore	Time trial C1–5	15:29.13	2nd place, silver medalist(s)
Katerina Brim	Time trial H1–5	15:14.83	1st place, gold medalist(s)
Jenna Rollman	Time trial H1–5	18:32.73	3rd place, bronze medalist(s)
Hannah Chadwick-Dias	Road race B	2:23:29	4
Jamie Whitmore	Road race C1–3	1:11:37	2nd place, silver medalist(s)
Samantha Bosco	Road race C4–5	1:47:16	3rd place, bronze medalist(s)
Elizabeth Neag	Road race C4–5	1:47:17	4
Katerina Brim	Road race H2–5	1:38:48	2nd place, silver medalist(s)
Jenna Rollman	Road race H2–5	1:38:49	3rd place, bronze medalist(s)

Mixed

Athlete	Event	Result	Rank
Dennis Connors	Time trial T1–2	17:14.27	2nd place, silver medalist(s)
Dennis Connors	Road race T1–2	56:55	1st place, gold medalist(s)

=== Track ===
Men

Athlete	Event	Qualification		Final	
Athlete	Event	Time	Rank	Opposition Time	Rank
Michael Stephens	Pursuit B	4:48.175	4 FB	Bronze medal final Villalba (ARG); L OVL	4
Michael Stephens	Time trial B	—N/a		1:02.974	1st place, gold medalist(s)
Joseph Berenyi	Pursuit C1–3	DNS		—N/a	
Joseph Berenyi	Time trial C1–5	—N/a		DNF	

Women

Athlete	Event	Qualification		Final	
Athlete	Event	Time	Rank	Opposition Time	Rank
Hannah Chadwick-Dias	Pursuit B	3:56.122	2 FG	Quiroga (ARG); W 3:41.632	1st place, gold medalist(s)
Jamie Whitmore	Pursuit C1–3	4:12.540	1 FG	Pemble-Chubb-Higgins (CAN); L 4:10.212	2nd place, silver medalist(s)
Samantha Bosco	Pursuit C4–5	3:50.412	2 FG	Shaw (CAN); W 3:45.752	1st place, gold medalist(s)
Katie Wen Walker	Pursuit C4–5	DNS		—N/a	
Hannah Chadwick-Dias	Time trial B	—N/a		1:12.265	1st place, gold medalist(s)
Samantha Bosco	Time trial C1–5	—N/a		39.335	5
Katie Wen Walker	Time trial C1–5	—N/a		39.161	4
Jamie Whitmore	Time trial C1–5	—N/a		40.831	10

== Football 7-a-side ==
Summary

Team	Event	Group stage						Final / BM	
Team	Event	Opposition Score	Opposition Score	Opposition Score	Opposition Score	Opposition Score	Rank	Opposition Score	Rank
United States men's	Men's tournament	Chile; W 4–2	Argentina; L 1–2	Brazil; L 0–2	Venezuela; W 1–0	Canada; W 6–0	3 FB	Bronze medal match Venezuela; W 3–0	3rd place, bronze medalist(s)

Preliminary round

18 November
14:30

Chile	2 – 4	United States
Saavedra Miranda 38'; Diaz Perez 63' (pen.)		DeLillo 16', 30'; Boyle 22'; Hammond 44'

Estadio Bicentenario de La Florida, Santiago

19 November
14:30

Argentina	2 – 1	United States
Billordo 32'; Carrizo 40'		Crumbley 61'

Estadio Bicentenario de La Florida, Santiago

20 November
19:30

United States	0 – 2	Brazil
		Batista de Aguiar 30+1'; Cardoso de Souza 33'

Estadio Bicentenario de La Florida, Santiago

21 November
14:30

United States	1 – 0	Venezuela
Hammond 53'

Estadio Bicentenario de La Florida, Santiago

23 November
17:00

United States	6 – 0	Canada
Brunais 1', 30+4'; DeLillo 7', 15'; Lowery Jr. 40'; McCandlish 60'

Estadio Bicentenario de La Florida, Santiago

Bronze medal match

25 November
17:00

United States	3 – 0	Venezuela
Hammond 35', 41'; Lowery Jr. 51'

Estadio Bicentenario de La Florida, Santiago

== Goalball ==
Summary

Team	Event	Group stage				Quarterfinal	Semifinal	Final / BM	
Team	Event	Opposition Score	Opposition Score	Opposition Score	Rank	Opposition Score	Opposition Score	Opposition Score	Rank
United States men's	Men's tournament	Canada; W 9–2	Argentina; W 9–5	Venezuela; W 15–5	1 Q	Colombia; W 11–2	Canada; W 11–4	Brazil; L 2–12	2nd place, silver medalist(s)
United States women's	Women's tournament	Canada; W 5–3	Chile; W 9–1	Peru; W 9–1	1 Q	Guatemala; W 10–0	Argentina; W 8–1	Canada; L 3–4	2nd place, silver medalist(s)

== Judo ==
Men

Athlete	Event	Round of 16	Quarterfinals	Semifinals	Repechage 1	Repechage 2	Final / BM	
Athlete	Event	Opposition Result	Opposition Result	Opposition Result	Opposition Result	Opposition Result	Opposition Result	Rank
Ronald Hawthorne	−60 kg	Bye	Marques (BRA); L 00S1–10S1	Did not advance	Bye	Aburto (MEX); L 00–11	Did not advance	
Anthony Ferraro	−73 kg	Pérez (PUR); W 01S1–00S2	Pereira (BRA); L 00–11	Did not advance	Bye	Ramirez (ARG); W 10–00	Bronze medal final García (CUB); L 00–10	=5
Robert Kim	−73 kg	Ortiz (MEX); L 00–10	Did not advance					
Ben Goodrich	−90 kg	—N/a	Zamora (CUB); W 10–00	Azevedo (BRA); L 00S1–01	—N/a	Bye	Bronze medal final Riquelme (CHI); W 10–00	3rd place, bronze medalist(s)
Richard Ties	−90 kg	—N/a	Riquelme (CHI); W 10–00	Cavalcante (BRA); L 00S1–10	—N/a	Bye	Bronze medal final Espinoza (VEN); W 10–00	3rd place, bronze medalist(s)

Women

Athlete	Event	Round of 16	Quarterfinals	Semifinals	Repechage	Final / BM	
Athlete	Event	Opposition Result	Opposition Result	Opposition Result	Opposition Result	Opposition Result	Rank
Maria Liana Mutia	−57 kg	Bye	Oliveira (BRA); W 10–00S1	González (ARG); W 10–00	Bye	Teixeira (BRA); L 00S2–10	2nd place, silver medalist(s)
Katie Davis	+70 kg	—N/a	Hernández (CUB); L 00–11	Did not advance	Bye	Bronze medal final Mederos (URU); W 10–00	3rd place, bronze medalist(s)
Christella Garcia	+70 kg	—N/a	Mederos (URU); L 00–10	Did not advance	Sanabria (VEN); L 00S2–11	Did not advance	

== Powerlifting ==
Men

Athlete	Event	Total lifted	Rank
Jacob Herbert	–59 kg	150	4
David Horvath	–59 kg	135	5
Garrison Redd	–65 kg	130	6
Ahmed Shafik	–88 kg	182	5
Bobby Body	–107 kg & +107 kg	136.3	1st place, gold medalist(s)

Women

Athlete	Event	Total lifted	Rank
Ashley Dyce	–86 kg & +86 kg	78.1	6

Mixed

Athlete	Event	Qualification		Semifinal	Final / BM	
Athlete	Event	Result	Rank	Opposition Result	Opposition Result	Rank
Bobby Body; Jacob Herbert; Ashley Dyce	Team	198.4	5	Did not advance		

== Shooting ==
Men

Athlete	Event	Qualification		Final	
Athlete	Event	Score	Rank	Score	Rank
Marco De La Rosa	P1 – 10 m air pistol SH1	555	3 Q	227.6	1st place, gold medalist(s)
Yanxiao Gong	P1 – 10 m air pistol SH1	559	2 Q	204.7	3rd place, bronze medalist(s)
Michael Tagliapietra	P1 – 10 m air pistol SH1	513	12	Did not advance	

Mixed

Athlete	Event	Qualification		Final	
Athlete	Event	Score	Rank	Score	Rank
Marco De La Rosa	P3 – 25 m pistol SH1	558	2 Q	16	2nd place, silver medalist(s)
Yanxiao Gong	P3 – 25 m pistol SH1	569	1 Q	24	1st place, gold medalist(s)
Michael Tagliapietra	P3 – 25 m pistol SH1	540	4 Q	13	3rd place, bronze medalist(s)
Yanxiao Gong	P4 – 50 m pistol SH1	539	1 Q	145.0	5
Nick Beach	R1/R2 – 10 m air rifle standing SH1	569.7	6 Q	177.5	5
Taylor Farmer	R1/R2 – 10 m air rifle standing SH1	606.0	3 Q	156.6	6
Taylor Farmer	R3 – 10 m air rifle prone SH1	619.2	9	Did not advance	
Kevin Nguyen	R3 – 10 m air rifle prone SH1	628.3	3 Q	208.6	4
Landon Ruggera	R3 – 10 m air rifle prone SH1	627.3	4 Q	185.9	5
Madison Champion	R4 – 10 m air rifle standing SH2	620.2	5 Q	183.8	5
Stetson Bardfield	R5 – 10 m air rifle prone SH2	633.1	3 Q	253.4	1st place, gold medalist(s)
Madison Champion	R5 – 10 m air rifle prone SH2	631.4	6 Q	166.8	6
John Joss III	R6 – 50 m rifle prone SH1	614.4	4 Q	198.3	4
Kevin Nguyen	R6 – 50 m rifle prone SH1	615.8	2 Q	218.2	3rd place, bronze medalist(s)
Landon Ruggera	R6 – 50 m rifle prone SH1	614.0	5 Q	136.3	7

== Swimming ==
Men

Athlete	Event	Heat		Final	
Athlete	Event	Time	Rank	Time	Rank
Abbas Karimi	50 m freestyle S5	36.94	3 Q	36.88	3rd place, bronze medalist(s)
Connor Gioffreda	50 m freestyle S7	35.05	9	Did not advance	
Adin Williams	50 m freestyle S7	31.23	4 Q	30.96	5
Noah Busch	50 m freestyle S9	27.94	5 Q	27.34	3rd place, bronze medalist(s)
Yaseen El-Demerdash	50 m freestyle S10	—N/a		25.42	3rd place, bronze medalist(s)
Abbas Karimi	100 m freestyle S5	1:37.08	10	Did not advance	
Connor Gioffreda	100 m freestyle S6	—N/a		1:14.11	8
Jack O'Neil	100 m freestyle S8	—N/a		1:05.75	5
Adin Williams	100 m freestyle S8	—N/a		1:06.85	7
Yaseen El-Demerdash	100 m freestyle S10	—N/a		56.39	2nd place, silver medalist(s)
William Rankine	100 m freestyle S12	1:00.60	2 Q	1:01.74	6
Evan Wilkerson	100 m freestyle S12	1:01.66	4 Q	1:00.42	5
Jeff Lovett	200 m freestyle S14	2:18.01	9	Did not advance	
Trevor Lukacsko	200 m freestyle S14	2:08.71	5 Q	2:07.67	5
Connor Gioffreda	400 m freestyle S6	—N/a		5:39.98	5
Adin Williams	400 m freestyle S7	—N/a		5:03.48	2nd place, silver medalist(s)
Carson Bruner	400 m freestyle S9	4:45.65	4 Q	4:44.04	5
Evan Wilkerson	400 m freestyle S13	—N/a		4:49.34	4
Abbas Karimi	50 m backstroke S5	—N/a		48.57	6
Jack O'Neil	100 m backstroke S8	—N/a		1:12.17	2nd place, silver medalist(s)
Noah Busch	100 m backstroke S9	1:10.19	4 Q	1:09.25	4
Carson Bruner	100 m backstroke S9	1:12.72	6 Q	1:11.64	6
Braxton Wong	100 m backstroke S9	1:12.22	5 Q	1:10.31	5
Yaseen El-Demerdash	100 m backstroke S10	—N/a		1:04.36	1st place, gold medalist(s)
Evan Wilkerson	100 m backstroke S12	—N/a		1:06.81	2nd place, silver medalist(s)
Jeff Lovett	100 m backstroke S14	1:12.20	9	Did not advance	
Trevor Lukacsko	100 m backstroke S14	1:06.63	5 Q	1:06.09	5
Connor Gioffreda	100 m breaststroke SB6	1:41.93	8 Q	1:39.19	7
Zachary Shattuck	100 m breaststroke SB6	1:26.42	2 Q	1:25.23	2nd place, silver medalist(s)
David Gelfand	100 m breaststroke SB8	1:21.58	4 Q	1:18.63	4
Braxton Wong	100 m breaststroke SB8	1:32.62	7 Q	1:30.50	7
Noah Busch	100 m breaststroke SB9	1:23.32	7 Q	1:20.02	6
Emmett Martin	100 m breaststroke SB9	1:15.46	5 Q	1:15.86	5
William Rankine	100 m breaststroke SB12	—N/a		1:14.35	2nd place, silver medalist(s)
Evan Wilkerson	100 m breaststroke SB12	—N/a		1:21.21	3rd place, bronze medalist(s)
Jeff Lovett	100 m breaststroke SB14	—N/a		1:16.11	5
Trevor Lukacsko	100 m breaststroke SB14	—N/a		1:15.82	4
Abbas Karimi	50 m butterfly S5	—N/a		37.62	3rd place, bronze medalist(s)
Connor Gioffreda	50 m butterfly S6	36.27	6 Q	35.34	6
Zachary Shattuck	50 m butterfly S6	34.91	4 Q	33.67	3rd place, bronze medalist(s)
Evan Austin	50 m butterfly S7	—N/a		29.31	1st place, gold medalist(s)
Adin Williams	50 m butterfly S7	—N/a		33.78	5
Carson Bruner	100 m butterfly S9	1:08.95	8 Q	1:09.12	8
David Gelfand	100 m butterfly S9	1:06.41	4 Q	1:05.38	3rd place, bronze medalist(s)
Braxton Wong	100 m butterfly S9	1:05.73	1 Q	1:05.68	5
Yaseen El-Demerdash	100 m butterfly S10	—N/a		1:02.54	5
Emmett Martin	100 m butterfly S10	—N/a		1:08.42	7
William Rankine	100 m butterfly S12	—N/a		1:08.24	5
Evan Wilkerson	100 m butterfly S12	—N/a		1:05.67	4
Jeff Lovett	100 m butterfly S14	—N/a		1:02.35	4
Trevor Lukacsko	100 m butterfly S14	—N/a		1:00.76	3rd place, bronze medalist(s)
Connor Gioffreda	200 m individual medley SM6	3:16.35	9	Did not advance	
Adin Williams	200 m individual medley SM7	—N/a		3:02.32	4
Jack O'Neil	200 m individual medley SM8	—N/a		Did not start	
Noah Busch	200 m individual medley SM9	2:35.83	5 Q	2:33.88	5
David Gelfand	200 m individual medley SM9	2:28.92	1 Q	2:27.24	2nd place, silver medalist(s)
Braxton Wong	200 m individual medley SM9	2:33.47	3 Q	2:33.40	4
Emmett Martin	200 m individual medley SM10	—N/a		2:36.46	6
William Rankine	200 m individual medley SM13	—N/a		2:30.48	3rd place, bronze medalist(s)
Evan Wilkerson	200 m individual medley SM13	—N/a		Did not start	
Jeff Lovett	200 m individual medley SM14	2:28.42	7 Q	2:27.99	5
Trevor Lukacsko	200 m individual medley SM14	2:20.90	3 Q	2:29.94	7

Women

Athlete	Event	Heat		Final	
Athlete	Event	Time	Rank	Time	Rank
Megan Gioffreda	50 m freestyle S6	—N/a		35.40	2nd place, silver medalist(s)
McKenzie Coan	50 m freestyle S8	34.00	4 Q	33.39	3rd place, bronze medalist(s)
Haven Shepherd	50 m freestyle S8	36.27	8 Q	35.98	7
Gabriella Farinas	50 m freestyle S10	—N/a		32.78	5
Grace Nuhfer	50 m freestyle S13	—N/a		27.90	2nd place, silver medalist(s)
McKenzie Coan	100 m freestyle S7	1:12.43	1 Q	1:11.98	2nd place, silver medalist(s)
Maria Francescotti	100 m freestyle S9	1:10.05	6 Q	1:08.73	5
Keegan Knott	100 m freestyle S9	1:10.42	7 Q	1:10.42	7
Natalie Sims	100 m freestyle S9	1:05.97	2 Q	1:05.32	2nd place, silver medalist(s)
Gabriella Farinas	100 m freestyle S10	—N/a		1:10.70	4
Taylor Winnett	100 m freestyle S10	—N/a		1:06.20	2nd place, silver medalist(s)
Abigail Kershaw	200 m freestyle S14	2:45.68	9	Did not advance	
Piper Sadowski	200 m freestyle S14	2:27.57	7 Q	2:28.36	6
Megan Gioffreda	400 m freestyle S6	—N/a		6:27.17	4
McKenzie Coan	400 m freestyle S8	—N/a		5:19.10	3rd place, bronze medalist(s)
Keegan Knott	400 m freestyle S9	5:03.66	1 Q	4:59.70	1st place, gold medalist(s)
Cali Prochaska	400 m freestyle S9	5:11.14	2 Q	5:08.16	2nd place, silver medalist(s)
Madelyn White	400 m freestyle S9	5:23.42	3 Q	5:17.34	3rd place, bronze medalist(s)
Chloe Cederholm	400 m freestyle S10	—N/a		5:21.56	5
Mikaela Jenkins	400 m freestyle S10	—N/a		5:00.36	3rd place, bronze medalist(s)
Taylor Winnett	400 m freestyle S10	—N/a		4:52.27	2nd place, silver medalist(s)
Megan Gioffreda	100 m backstroke S6	—N/a		1:34.42	3rd place, bronze medalist(s)
Amanda Sheward	100 m backstroke S6	—N/a		1:46.50	5
McKenzie Coan	100 m backstroke S7	—N/a		1:27.55	2nd place, silver medalist(s)
Haven Shepherd	100 m backstroke S8	1:26.95	2 Q	1:27.08	4
Maria Francescotti	100 m backstroke S9	—N/a		1:20.14	2nd place, silver medalist(s)
Keegan Knott	100 m backstroke S9	—N/a		1:21.98	3rd place, bronze medalist(s)
Madelyn White	100 m backstroke S9	—N/a		1:22.06	4
Chloe Cederholm	100 m backstroke S10	—N/a		1:13.63	2nd place, silver medalist(s)
Rachel Keehn	100 m backstroke S10	—N/a		1:18.14	4
Taylor Winnett	100 m backstroke S10	—N/a		1:12.79	1st place, gold medalist(s)
Abigail Kershaw	100 m backstroke S14	1:25.92	9	Did not advance	
Piper Sadowski	100 m backstroke S14	1:16.53	4 Q	1:15.07	4
Haven Shepherd	100 m breaststroke SB7	—N/a		1:44.97	4
Cali Prochaska	100 m breaststroke SB8	—N/a		1:38.28	3rd place, bronze medalist(s)
Madelyn White	100 m breaststroke SB8	—N/a		1:32.83	1st place, gold medalist(s)
Sarah Bofinger	100 m breaststroke SB9	—N/a		1:38.74	3rd place, bronze medalist(s)
Taylor Winnett	100 m breaststroke SB9	—N/a		1:32.85	2nd place, silver medalist(s)
Abigail Kershaw	100 m breaststroke SB14	—N/a		1:37.60	8
Haven Shepherd	100 m butterfly S8	—N/a		1:26.24	4
Elise Morley	100 m butterfly S9	—N/a		1:27.06	6
Cali Prochaska	100 m butterfly S9	—N/a		1:13.54	1st place, gold medalist(s)
Mikaela Jenkins	100 m butterfly S10	—N/a		1:09.90	2nd place, silver medalist(s)
Rachel Keehn	100 m butterfly S10	—N/a		1:15.39	4
Taylor Winnett	100 m butterfly S10	—N/a		1:09.35	1st place, gold medalist(s)
Abigail Kershaw	100 m butterfly S14	1:23.68	8 Q	1:18.04	8
Piper Sadowski	100 m butterfly S14	1:14.95	=3 Q	1:13.49	4
Megan Gioffreda	200 m individual medley SM6	—N/a		3:24.70	1st place, gold medalist(s)
Mallory Weggemann	200 m individual medley SM7	—N/a		3:10.43	3rd place, bronze medalist(s)
Haven Shepherd	200 m individual medley SM8	3:06.26	1 Q	3:03.26	1st place, gold medalist(s)
Keegan Knott	200 m individual medley SM9	—N/a		2:54.45	2nd place, silver medalist(s)
Cali Prochaska	200 m individual medley SM9	—N/a		2:53.88	1st place, gold medalist(s)
Madelyn White	200 m individual medley SM9	—N/a		Did not start	
Chloe Cederholm	200 m individual medley SM10	—N/a		2:45.89	3rd place, bronze medalist(s)
Rachel Keehn	200 m individual medley SM10	—N/a		2:53.77	4
Taylor Winnett	200 m individual medley SM10	—N/a		2:43.80	1st place, gold medalist(s)
Abigail Kershaw	200 m individual medley SM14	3:10.27	10	Did not advance	
Piper Sadowski	200 m individual medley SM14	2:49.11	7 Q	2:49.68	8

Mixed

Athlete	Event	Final	
Athlete	Event	Time	Rank
Yaseen El-Demerdash; Jack O'Neil; McKenzie Coan; Natalie Sims	4 × 100 m freestyle relay 34pts	4:18.44	2nd place, silver medalist(s)
Emmett Martin; Jack O'Neil; McKenzie Coan; Taylor Winnett	4 × 100 m medley relay 34pts	4:50.07	2nd place, silver medalist(s)

== Table tennis ==
Men

Athlete	Event	Preliminaries					Round of 16	Quarterfinals	Semifinals	Final / BM	
Athlete	Event	Opposition Result	Opposition Result	Opposition Result	Opposition Result	Rank	Opposition Result	Opposition Result	Opposition Result	Opposition Result	Rank
Michael Godfrey	Singles C1	Leiva (CHI); L 2–3	Fernández (CUB); L 0–3	Bustamante (ARG); L 0–3	Eberhardt (ARG); L 0–3	5	—N/a				5
Jenson Van Emburgh	Singles C3	Sanchez (COL); W 3–0	Silva (BRA); W 3–0	—N/a		1 Q	—N/a	Bye	Copola (ARG); W 3–1	Silva (BRA); W 3–1	1st place, gold medalist(s)
Zachary Pickett	Singles C4	Gonzalez (CHI); L 0–3	Sandoval (VEN); W 3–1	—N/a		2 Q	—N/a	Rodriguez (CHI); L 1–3	Did not advance		
Ahad Sarand	Singles C5	Arabian (BRA); L 0–3	Depergola (ARG); L 1–3	—N/a		3	Did not advance				
Samuel Altshuler	Singles C6	Yañez (PER); W 3–0	Torres (CHI); L 0–3	Pino (CHI); L 0–3	—N/a	3	Did not advance				
Ian Seidenfeld	Singles C6	Arguello (CRC); W 3–0	Dettoni (CHI); W 3–0	Prado (PER); W 3–0	—N/a	1 Q	—N/a		Pino (CHI); W 3–1	Torres (CHI); W 3–2	1st place, gold medalist(s)
Marco Makkar	Singles C8	Pérez (ARG); L 1–3	Mashki (BRA); L 2–3	Kent (CAN); W 3–2	—N/a	3	Did not advance				
Tahl Leibovitz	Singles C9	Reyes (CRC); W 3–0	Pavez (CHI); W 3–0	—N/a		1 Q	—N/a	Bye	Skliarsky (ARG); W 3–0	Carvalho (BRA); W 3–0	1st place, gold medalist(s)
Logan Watson	Singles C9	Sarmiento (ECU); W 3–0	Syed (CAN); W 3–1	Rivera (PUR); W 3–0	—N/a	1 Q	—N/a	Pavez (CHI); W 3–1	Carvalho (BRA); L 2–3	Did not advance	3rd place, bronze medalist(s)
Jerry I Vasquez	Singles C10	Massad (BRA); L 1–3	Regalado (ESA); W 3–1	—N/a		2 Q	—N/a	Antunes (BRA); L 1–3	Did not advance		
Raymond Sacco	Singles C11	Martinez (VEN); L 0–3	Rosas (CHI); L 0–3	—N/a		3	Did not advance				
Michael Godfrey; Zachary Pickett	Doubles C8	—N/a					Freitas / Moraes (BRA); L 0–3	Did not advance			
Ahad Sarand; Jenson Van Emburgh	Doubles C8	—N/a					Bye	Gonzalez / Reyes (MEX); L 1–3	Did not advance		
Marco Makkar; Ian Seidenfeld	Doubles C14	Pino / Torres (CHI); L 1–3	Córdoba / Evans (PAN); W 3–0	—N/a		2 Q	—N/a		Salmin / Stroh (BRA); L 2–3	Did not advance	3rd place, bronze medalist(s)
Samuel Altshuler; Jerry I Vasquez	Doubles C18	—N/a					Bahamondes / Echaveguren (CHI); L 1–3	Did not advance			
Tahl Leibovitz; Logan Watson	Doubles C18	—N/a					Bye	Dettoni / Pavez (CHI); W 3–0	Antunes / Mashki (BRA); L 1–3	Did not advance	3rd place, bronze medalist(s)

Women

Athlete	Event	Preliminaries				Quarterfinals	Semifinals	Final / BM	
Athlete	Event	Opposition Result	Opposition Result	Opposition Result	Rank	Opposition Result	Opposition Result	Opposition Result	Rank
Pamela Fontaine	Singles C1–3	Oliveira (BRA); L 0–3	Blanco (ARG); L 0–3	—N/a	3	Did not advance			
Valerie Rolph	Singles C4–5	Kuell (ARG); L 0–3	Miranda (ESA); W 3–0	Leonelli (CHI); L 0–3	3	Did not advance			
Pamela Fontaine; Valerie Rolph	Doubles C5–10	Oliveira / Oliveira (BRA); L 0–3	Guapi / Sanchez (COL); L 0–3	—N/a	3	Did not advance			

Mixed

Athlete	Event	Round of 16	Quarterfinals	Semifinals	Final / BM	
Athlete	Event	Opposition Result	Opposition Result	Opposition Result	Opposition Result	Rank
Jenson Van Emburgh; Pamela Fontaine	Doubles C4–7	Bye	Quijada / García (VEN); W 3–0	Babes / Severo (BRA); L 0–3	Did not advance	3rd place, bronze medalist(s)
Zachary Pickett; Valerie Rolph	Doubles C10	—N/a	Copola / Kuell (ARG); L 0–3	Did not advance		

== Taekwondo ==
Men

Athlete	Event	Round of 16	Quarterfinals	Semifinals	Repechage	Final / BM	
Athlete	Event	Opposition Result	Opposition Result	Opposition Result	Opposition Result	Opposition Result	Rank
Austin Osner	−70 kg	Bye	Cano (MEX); L DSQ	Did not advance	Peña (COL); L DSQ	Did not advance	
Michael Kacer	−80 kg	—N/a	Lopes (BRA); L 8–28	Did not advance	Loonstra (ARU); L 4–11	Did not advance	
Reginald Amerson	+80 kg	Did not start					
Evan Medell	+80 kg	—N/a	Bye	Figuereo (DOM); W 10–7	Bye	Moraes (BRA); W 10–0	1st place, gold medalist(s)

== Wheelchair basketball ==
Summary

Team	Event	Group stage				Quarterfinal	Semifinal	Final / BM	
Team	Event	Opposition Score	Opposition Score	Opposition Score	Rank	Opposition Score	Opposition Score	Opposition Score	Rank
United States men's	Men's tournament	Brazil; W 82–42	Puerto Rico; W 81–44	Colombia; W 66–51	1 Q	Chile; W 88–14	Argentina; W 88–54	Colombia; W 81–45	1st place, gold medalist(s)
United States women's	Women's tournament	Chile; W 96–10	Peru; W 80–12	Argentina; W 87–26	1 Q	—N/a	Brazil; W 60–30	Canada; W 62–56	1st place, gold medalist(s)

== Wheelchair rugby ==
Summary

Team	Event	Group stage						Semifinal	Final / BM	
Team	Event	Opposition Score	Opposition Score	Opposition Score	Opposition Score	Opposition Score	Rank	Opposition Score	Opposition Score	Rank
United States national team	Mixed tournament	Chile; W 62–27	Argentina; W 55–31	Colombia; W 57–42	Brazil; W 54–36	Canada; L 41–46	2 Q	Colombia; W 52–45	Canada; W 57–51	1st place, gold medalist(s)

== Wheelchair tennis ==
Men

Athlete	Event	Round of 32	Round of 16	Quarterfinals	Semifinals	Final / BM	
Athlete	Event	Opposition Result	Opposition Result	Opposition Result	Opposition Result	Opposition Result	Rank
Casey Ratzlaff	Singles	Bye	Muro (MEX); W 6–0, 6–1	Casco (ARG); W 6–3, 6–4	Cataldo (CHI); L 5–7, 1–6	Bronze medal match Rodrigues (BRA); L 3–6, 7–6^{(7–3)}, 3–6	4
Conner Stroud	Singles	Bye	Venos (CAN); W 6–3, 6–1	Rodrigues (BRA); L 3–6, 2–6	Did not advance		
Casey Ratzlaff; Conner Stroud	Doubles	—N/a	Bye	Henderson / Venos (CAN); W 6–1, 7–5	Carneiro / Rodrigues (BRA); L 6–1, 2–6, 5–10	Bronze medal match Cataldo / Tapia (CHI); L 3–6, 3–6	4

Women

Athlete	Event	Round of 16	Quarterfinals	Semifinals	Final / BM	
Athlete	Event	Opposition Result	Opposition Result	Opposition Result	Opposition Result	Rank
Dana Mathewson	Singles	Duval (BRA); W 6–2, 6–1	Meza (ECU); W 6–1, 6–1	Moreno (ARG); W 6–2, 7–6^{(7–4)}	Bernal (COL); W 6–3, 4–6, 6–2	1st place, gold medalist(s)
Maylee Phelps	Singles	Alves (BRA); W 6–4, 6–3	Cabrillana (CHI); L 3–6, 3–6	Did not advance		
Dana Mathewson; Maylee Phelps	Doubles	—N/a	Dolinar / Lanucha (CAN); W 6–0, 6–2	Cabrillana / Fuentes (CHI); W 6–1, 6–0	Alves / Duval (BRA); W 3–6, 6–2, 10–8	1st place, gold medalist(s)

Quad

Athlete	Event	Round of 16	Quarterfinals	Semifinals	Final / BM	
Athlete	Event	Opposition Result	Opposition Result	Opposition Result	Opposition Result	Rank
Andrew Bogdanov	Singles	Campaz (COL); L 4–6, 2–6	Did not advance			
David Wagner	Singles	Bye	Pena (BRA); L 0–6, 2–6	Did not advance		
Andrew Bogdanov; David Wagner	Doubles	—N/a	McIntyre / Shaw (CAN); W 6–3, 3–6, 10–2	Cayulef / Pérez (CHI); L 4–6, 0–6	Bronze medal match Campaz / Moreno (COL); W 6–4, 6–4	3rd place, bronze medalist(s)

== See also ==
- United States at the 2023 Pan American Games
- United States at the 2024 Summer Paralympics
