= Athletics at the 2023 Parapan American Games – Men's 1500 metres T13 =

Men's 1500 metres T13 at the 2023 Parapan American Games
- Venue: Mario Recordón Athletics Training Center
- Dates: November 24
- Competitors: 5 from 3 nations
- Winning time: 3:56.24

Medalists
1st place, gold medalist(s)		Joel Gómez	United States
2nd place, silver medalist(s)		Sixto Moreta	Ecuador
3rd place, bronze medalist(s)		Sivaldo de Souza	Brazil

The men's T13 1500 metres competition of the athletics events at the 2023 Parapan American Games was held on November 24 at the Mario Recordón Athletics Training Center within the Julio Martínez National Stadium of Santiago, Chile.

== Records ==
Prior to this competition, the existing world and Pan American Games records were as follows:

World record	Abdellatif Baka (ALG)	3:48.29	Rio de Janeiro, Brazil	September 11, 2016
Parapan American Games record	Lazaro Rashid (CUB)	3:56.76	Rio de Janeiro, Brazil	August 17, 2007
Americas record	Odair Dos Santos (BRA)	3:50.66	Assen, Netherlands	September 9, 2006

== Schedule ==
Date	Time	Round
November 25, 2023	18:32	Final

== Results ==
All times shown are in seconds.

KEY:	q	Fastest non-qualifiers	Q	Qualified	PR	Parapan Games record	NR	National record	SB	Seasonal best	DQ	Disqualified

=== Final ===
The results were as follows:

Rank	Lane	Name	Nationality	Time	Notes
1st place, gold medalist(s)	1	Joel Gómez	United States	3:56.24	PR
2nd place, silver medalist(s)	4	Sixto Moreta	Ecuador	4:02.95	
3rd place, bronze medalist(s)	2	Sivaldo de Souza	Brazil	4:10.24	
4	3	Noah Scherf	United States	4:21.35	
5	5	Caleb Howard	United States	4:36.39	
