= Cycling at the 2023 Parapan American Games – Women's road time trial C1–5 =

Women's road time trial C1–5 at the 2023 Parapan American Games
- Venue: Streets of Isla de Maipo
- Dates: November 19
- Competitors: 16 from 7 nations
- Winning time: 15:08.01

Medalists
1st place, gold medalist(s)		Samantha Bosco	United States
2nd place, silver medalist(s)		Jamie Whitmore	United States
3rd place, bronze medalist(s)		Daniela Munévar	Colombia

The women's individual road time trial C1–5 competition of the cycling events at the 2023 Parapan American Games was held on November 19 on the Streets of Isla de Maipo, Chile.

== Schedule ==
Date	Time	Round
November 19, 2023	10:30	Final

== Results ==
The results were as follows:

Rank	Class	Rider	Nation	Time
1st place, gold medalist(s)	C4	Samantha Bosco	United States	15:08.01
2nd place, silver medalist(s)	C3	Jamie Whitmore	United States	15:29.13
3rd place, bronze medalist(s)	C2	Daniela Munévar	Colombia	15:33.43
4	C4	Keely Shaw	Canada	15:34.08
5	C5	Paula Ossa	Colombia	16:18.10
6	C5	Elizabeth Neag	United States	16:21.86
7	C3	Melissa Pemble-Chubb-Higgins	Canada	16:55.52
8	C2	Gilda Hernández	Mexico	16:57.07
9	C3	Paula Caballeros	Colombia	17:10.29
10	C5	Mariela Delgado	Argentina	17:36.24
11	C3	Amanda Antunes de Paiva	Brazil	17:37.33
12	C2	Sabrina Custódia	Brazil	17:48.81
13	C3	María Magdalena Sergo	Argentina	18:10.08
14	C2	Victoria de Camargo e Barbosa	Brazil	18:19.04
15	C4	Juana Tureuna	Chile	18:52.50
16	C4	Génesis González	Chile	20:01.66
