= Cycling at the 2023 Parapan American Games – Women's road race C4–5 =

Women's road race C4–5 at the 2023 Parapan American Games
- Venue: Streets of Isla de Maipo
- Dates: November 26
- Competitors: 7 from 5 nations
- Winning time: 1:35:39

Medalists
1st place, gold medalist(s)		Paula Ossa	Colombia
2nd place, silver medalist(s)		Mariela Delgado	Argentina
3rd place, bronze medalist(s)		Samantha Bosco	United States

The women's individual road race C4–5 competition of the cycling events at the 2023 Parapan American Games was held on November 26 on the Streets of Isla de Maipo, Chile.

== Schedule ==
Date	Time	Round
November 26, 2023	11:45	Final

== Results ==
The results were as follows:

Rank	Class	Rider	Nation	Time
1st place, gold medalist(s)	C5	Paula Ossa	Colombia	1:35:39
2nd place, silver medalist(s)	C5	Mariela Delgado	Argentina	1:47:16
3rd place, bronze medalist(s)	C4	Samantha Bosco	United States	1:47:16
4	C5	Elizabeth Neag	United States	1:47:17
5	C4	Keely Shaw	Canada	1:47:18
6	C4	Juana Tureuna	Chile	-1 LAP
7	C4	Génesis González	Chile	-1 LAP
