= Uruguay at the 2023 Parapan American Games =

- Flag of Uruguay
- IPC code: URU
- NPC: Uruguayan Paralympic Committee
- Website: www.paralympic.org/uruguay

in Santiago, Chile 17 November 2023 – 26 November 2023
- Competitors: 11 in 8 sports
- Flag bearers: Henry Borges; Hanna Arias
- Medals Ranked 17th: Gold 0 Silver 1 Bronze 1 Total 2

Parapan American Games appearances
- 1999; 2003; 2007; 2011; 2015; 2019; 2023

Uruguay competed at the 2023 Parapan American Games in Santiago, Chile from 17 November to 26 November 2023. This was Uruguay's seventh appearance at the Parapan American Games, having competed at every edition of the games since the inaugural edition in 1999.

Paralympic judoka Henry Borges and para swimmer Hanna Arias were the country's flagbearers during the opening ceremony.

== Medalists ==
The following competitors won medals at the games. In the discipline sections below, the medalists' names are bolded.

Medal	Name	Sport	Event	Date
Silver	Carmelo Milan	Shooting	Mixed 10 metre air rifle standing SH2	November 21
Bronze	Henry Borges	Judo	Men's 60 kg	November 19

== Competitors ==
The following is the list of number of competitors (per gender) participating at the games per sport/discipline.

Sport	Men	Women	Total
Athletics	2	0	2
Boccia	0	1	1
Cycling	1	0	1
Judo	1	1	2
Shooting	1	0	1
Swimming	0	2	2
Table tennis	1	0	1
Wheelchair tennis	1	0	1
Total	7	4	11

== Athletics ==
Men

Track events

Athlete	Event	Semifinal		Final	
Athlete	Event	Result	Rank	Result	Rank
Eduardo Dutra	800 m T53/T54	DSQ		Did not advance	
Eduardo Dutra	1500 m T54	—N/a		3:11.82	6
Daniel Davrieux	1500 m T11	4:43.69	4	Did not advance	
Daniel Davrieux	5000 m T11	—N/a		18:08.53	7

== Boccia ==
Women

Athlete	Event	Pool matches			Quarterfinals	Semifinals	Final / BM	
Athlete	Event	Opposition Score	Opposition Score	Rank	Opposition Score	Opposition Score	Opposition Score	Rank
Lucia Barboza	Individual BC3	Ferrando (ARG); **L** 0–16	Callupe (PER); **L** 2–7	3	Did not advance			

== Cycling ==
=== Road ===
Men

Athlete	Event	Result	Rank
Pablo José Rosso	Time trial C1–5	34:28.92	25
Pablo José Rosso	Road race C4–5	–1 LAP	11

=== Track ===
Men

Athlete	Event	Qualification		Final	
Athlete	Event	Time	Rank	Opposition Time	Rank
Pablo José Rosso	Pursuit C4–5	5:52.357	9	Did not advance	
Pablo José Rosso	Time trial C1–5	—N/a		DNF	

== Judo ==
Men

Athlete	Event	Round of 16	Quarterfinals	Semifinals	Repechage 1	Repechage 2	Final / BM	
Athlete	Event	Opposition Result	Opposition Result	Opposition Result	Opposition Result	Opposition Result	Opposition Result	Rank
**Henry Borges**	−60 kg	Bye	Aburto (MEX); **W** 10S1–00	Marques (BRA); **L** 00–10S2	Bye		Bronze medal final Gómez (ARG); **W** 10–00	3rd place, bronze medalist(s)

Women

Athlete	Event	Quarterfinals	Semifinals	Repechage	Final / BM	
Athlete	Event	Opposition Result	Opposition Result	Opposition Result	Opposition Result	Rank
Mariana Mederos	+70 kg	Garcia (USA); **W** 10–00	Emmerich (BRA); **L** 00S1–10	Bye	Bronze medal final Davis (USA); **L** 00–10	=5

== Shooting ==
Mixed

Athlete	Event	Qualification		Final	
Athlete	Event	Score	Rank	Score	Rank
**Carmelo Milan**	R4 – 10 m air rifle standing SH2	618.1	6 **Q**	248.0	2nd place, silver medalist(s)
**Carmelo Milan**	R5 – 10 m air rifle prone SH2	625.2	8 **Q**	123.7	8

== Swimming ==
Women

Athlete	Event	Heat		Final	
Athlete	Event	Time	Rank	Time	Rank
Camila Suarez	50 m freestyle S6	—N/a		56.06	7
Hanna Arias	100 m freestyle S9	1:20.50	11	Did not advance	

== Table tennis ==
Men

Athlete	Event	Preliminaries				Quarterfinals	Semifinals	Final / BM	
Athlete	Event	Opposition Result	Opposition Result	Opposition Result	Rank	Opposition Result	Opposition Result	Opposition Result	Rank
Gonzalo Acosta	Singles C3	Nodarse (CUB); **W** 3–1	Freitas (BRA); **L** 0–3	Bienati (ARG); **W** 3–0	2 **Q**	Silva (BRA); **L** 0–3	Did not advance		

== Wheelchair tennis ==
Men

Athlete	Event	Round of 32	Round of 16	Quarterfinals	Semifinals	Final / BM	
Athlete	Event	Opposition Result	Opposition Result	Opposition Result	Opposition Result	Opposition Result	Rank
Luciano Varela	Singles	Bello (VEN); **W** 6–0, 6–0	Casco (ARG); **L** 1–6, 2–6	Did not advance			

== See also ==
- Uruguay at the 2023 Pan American Games
- Uruguay at the 2024 Summer Paralympics
