= Shooting at the 2023 Parapan American Games – P1 Men's 10 metre air pistol SH1 =

Men's 10 metre air pistol SH1 at the 2023 Parapan American Games
- Venue: Lo Aguirre Shooting Range
- Dates: November 19
- Competitors: 15 from 8 nations

Medalists
1st place, gold medalist(s)		Marco De La Rosa	United States
2nd place, silver medalist(s)		Di Angelo Loriga	Cuba
3rd place, bronze medalist(s)		Yanxiao Gong	United States

The Men's 10 metre air pistol SH1 competition of the shooting events at the 2023 Parapan American Games was held on November 18 at Lo Aguirre Shooting Range (Polígono de Tiro de Pudahuel) in Santiago, Chile.

== Results ==
=== Qualification round ===
The best eight scores advance to the final:

Rank	Athlete	Country	1	2	3	4	5	6	Total	Notes
1	Alexander Reyna	Cuba	94	91	94	94	92	95	560-12x	Q, PR
2	Yanxiao Gong	United States	91	95	90	95	93	95	559-12x	Q
3	Marco De La Rosa	United States	96	92	93	91	95	88	555-11x	Q
4	Di Angelo Loriga	Cuba	89	93	89	94	94	96	555-7x	Q
5	Deiber Arredondo	Colombia	92	93	91	91	86	89	542-12x	Q
6	Arístides Guevara	Panama	90	89	93	89	92	88	541-12x	Q
7	Edwin Mora	Colombia	89	87	91	95	93	86	541-12x	Q
8	Mario Córdova	Mexico	89	92	88	95	91	85	540-11x	Q
9	Geraldo von Rosenthal	Brazil	88	90	91	95	87	89	540-9x	
10	Rodrigo Encina	Chile	84	93	88	87	89	78	519-4x	
11	Pablo Peña	Chile	90	85	85	87	86	86	519-2x	
12	Michael Tagliapietra	United States	87	81	82	88	85	90	513-6x	
13	Osvaldo Gentili	Argentina	83	88	83	84	89	84	511-4x	
14	Rodolfo Urbina	Chile	74	77	73	82	70	81	457-0x	
	Sergio Vida	Brazil							DNS	

=== Final ===
The results were as follows:

Rank	Athlete	Country	1st Stage		2nd Stage							Total	Notes
1st place, gold medalist(s)	Marco De La Rosa	United States	49.9; 10.0; 9.9; 10.3; 9.7; 10.0	95.3; 9.4; 8.4; 10.1; 8.7; 8.8	112.8; 7.9; 9.6	132.1; 9.4; 9.9	152.8; 10.5; 9.9	171.3; 9.5; 9.0	189.7; 10.0; 8.4	207.7; 9.4; 8.6	10.1; 9.8	227.6	
2nd place, silver medalist(s)	Di Angelo Loriga	Cuba	45.7; 10.3; 8.6; 8.6; 8.9; 9.3	92.8; 10.3; 8.8; 9.2; 9.0; 9.8	111.0; 9.9; 8.3	130.5; 10.8; 8.7	151.2; 10.6; 10.1	169.7; 8.8; 9.7	188.6; 8.8; 10.1	207.3; 8.3; 10.4	9.4; 10.0	226.7	
3rd place, bronze medalist(s)	Yanxiao Gong	United States	47.4; 9.8; 10.1; 9.6; 8.6; 9.3	93.6; 7.7; 9.9; 10.0; 10.1; 8.8	111.7; 8.3; 9.5	130.6; 10.6; 8.3	150.0; 9.9; 9.5	168.6; 9.6; 9.0	187.0; 9.3; 9.1	9.3; 8.4		204.7	
4	Edwin Mora	Colombia	43.8; 9.3; 7.9; 8.0; 9.4; 9.2	93.6; 9.6; 10.3; 10.3; 9.9; 9.7	111.7; 9.9; 8.2	129.5; 8.1; 9.7	148.5; 9.8; 9.2	167.5; 9.4; 9.6	10.7; 4.9			183.1	
5	Alexander Reyna	Cuba	45.3; 8.7; 9.6; 10.5; 9.3; 7.2	91.6; 10.4; 7.9; 9.6; 8.4; 10.0	108.0; 8.3; 8.1	128.6; 10.5; 10.1	148.4; 10.7; 9.1	8.5; 9.7				166.6	
6	Deiber Arredondo	Colombia	43.8; 8.2; 9.1; 8.4; 9.8; 8.3	88.8; 9.5; 8.8; 8.9; 9.2; 8.6	106.6; 8.8; 9.0	122.6; 7.2; 8.8	9.8; 8.8					141.2	
7	Arístides Guevara	Panama	45.4; 8.0; 10.0; 8.8; 10.6; 8.0	89.1; 8.3; 10.2; 7.9; 9.0; 8.3	107.8; 9.8; 8.9	7.3; 6.5						121.6	
8	Mario Córdova	Mexico	39.5; 8.5; 8.0; 8.1; 6.4; 8.5	84.9; 8.9; 9.9; 9.4; 8.1; 9.1	10.2; 8.8							103.9	
