= Judo at the 2023 Parapan American Games – Men's 90 kg =

Men's 90 kg at the 2023 Parapan American Games
- Venue: Contact Sports Center
- Dates: November 20
- Competitors: 7 from 5 nations

Medalists
1st place, gold medalist(s)		Marcelo de Azevedo	Brazil
2nd place, silver medalist(s)		Arthur Cavalcante	Brazil
3rd place, bronze medalist(s)		Ben Goodrich	United States
3rd place, bronze medalist(s)		Richard Ties	United States

The men's 90 kg competition of the judo events at the 2023 Parapan American Games was held on November 20 at the Contact Sports Center (Centro de Entrenamiento de los Deportes de Contacto) in Santiago, Chile. A total of 7 athletes from 5 NOC's competed.

== Results ==
=== Repechage ===
Repechage 1
Héctor Espinoza (VEN)	10
Reinaldo Zamora (CUB)	00

Bronze metal match
Juan Riquelme (CHI)	00
Ben Goodrich (USA)	10
Héctor Espinoza (VEN)	00
Richard Ties (USA)	10

=== Main Bracket ===
Quarterfinals		Semifinals		Final
		Arthur Cavalcante (BRA)	10
Richard Ties (USA)	10	Richard Ties (USA)	00
Juan Riquelme (CHI)	00			Arthur Cavalcante (BRA)	00
Marcelo de Azevedo (BRA)	10			Marcelo de Azevedo (BRA)	01
Héctor Espinoza (VEN)	00	Marcelo de Azevedo (BRA)	01
Ben Goodrich (USA)	10	Ben Goodrich (USA)	00
Reinaldo Zamora (CUB)	00
