= Athletics at the 2023 Parapan American Games – Men's 1500 metres T46 =

Men's 1500 metres T46 at the 2023 Parapan American Games
- Venue: Mario Recordón Athletics Training Center
- Dates: November 22
- Competitors: 7 from 5 nations
- Winning time: 4:12.50

Medalists
1st place, gold medalist(s)		Mauricio Orrego	Chile
2nd place, silver medalist(s)		Tahmar Upshaw	United States
3rd place, bronze medalist(s)		Bryan Muguicha	Ecuador

The men's T46 1500 metres competition of the athletics events at the 2023 Parapan American Games was held on November 22 at the Mario Recordón Athletics Training Center within the Julio Martínez National Stadium of Santiago, Chile.

== Records ==
Prior to this competition, the existing world and Pan American Games records were as follows:

World record	Michael Roeger (AUS)	3:46.51	Sydney, Australia	February 4, 2017
Parapan American Games record	Mario Santillan (MEX)	4:08.44	Rio de Janeiro, Brazil	August 18, 2007
Americas record	Pedro Meza Zempoaltecatl (MEX)	4:08.26	Athens, Greece	September 20, 2004

== Schedule ==
Date	Time	Round
November 25, 2023	18:53	Final

== Results ==
All times shown are in seconds.

KEY:	q	Fastest non-qualifiers	Q	Qualified	PR	Parapan Games record	NR	National record	SB	Seasonal best	DQ	Disqualified

=== Final ===
The results were as follows:

Rank	Lane	Name	Nationality	Time	Notes
1st place, gold medalist(s)	1	Mauricio Orrego	Chile	4:12.50	
2nd place, silver medalist(s)	7	Tahmar Upshaw	United States	4:12.96	
3rd place, bronze medalist(s)	2	Bryan Muguicha	Ecuador	4:16.67	
4	5	Ignacio Sepúlveda	Chile	4:18.08	SB
5	4	Efrain Sotacuro	Peru	4:21.30	
6	6	Luis José Loreto	Venezuela	4:23.01	
7	3	Carlos Sangama	Peru	4:27.60	
