= Athletics at the 2023 Parapan American Games – Men's 100 metres T54 =

Men's 100 metres T54 at the 2023 Parapan American Games
- Venue: Mario Recordón Athletics Training Center
- Dates: November 24
- Competitors: 10 from 7 nations
- Winning time: 13.80

Medalists
1st place, gold medalist(s)		Juan Pablo Cervantes	Mexico
2nd place, silver medalist(s)		Cristian Ribera	Brazil
3rd place, bronze medalist(s)		Evan Correll	United States

The men's T54 100 metres competition of the athletics events at the 2023 Parapan American Games was held on November 24 at the Mario Recordón Athletics Training Center within the Julio Martínez National Stadium of Santiago, Chile.

== Records ==
Prior to this competition, the existing world and Pan American Games records were as follows:

World record	Athiwat Paeng-Nuea (THA)	13.63	Paris, France	July 15, 2023
Parapan American Games record	Juan Pablo Cervantes (MEX)	14.17	Lima, Peru	August 27, 2019
Americas record	Juan Pablo Cervantes (MEX)	13.85	Tokyo, Japan	September 1, 2021

== Schedule ==
Date	Time	Round
November 24, 2023	17:40	Semifinal
November 24, 2023	19:46	Final

== Results ==
All times shown are in seconds.

KEY:	q	Fastest non-qualifiers	Q	Qualified	PR	Parapan Games record	NR	National record	SB	Seasonal best	DQ	Disqualified

=== Semifinals ===
The fastest two athletes of each semifinal advance to the final. The results were as follows:

Rank	Heat	Name	Nationality	Time	Notes
1	1	Juan Pablo Cervantes	Mexico	13.92	Q
2	2	Cristian Ribera	Brazil	14.57	Q, SB
3	1	Isaiah Christophe	Canada	14.69	Q
4	1	Evan Correll	United States	14.86	Q
5	1	Sairo Fernandez	Colombia	15.16	q
6	1	Juan Ramón Valladares	Venezuela	15.21	q
7	2	Luis Oviedo	Mexico	15.37	Q
8	2	Miguel Jimenez-Vergara	United States	15.67	Q
9	2	Valera Allen	United States	15.71	
10	2	Laurens Molina	Costa Rica	16.03	

=== Final ===
The results were as follows:
Wind: +1.6 m/s

Rank	Lane	Name	Nationality	Time	Notes
1st place, gold medalist(s)	4	Juan Pablo Cervantes	Mexico	13.80	PR
2nd place, silver medalist(s)	5	Cristian Ribera	Brazil	14.34	SB
3rd place, bronze medalist(s)	8	Evan Correll	United States	14.54	SB
4	3	Isaiah Christophe	Canada	14.78	SB
5	2	Sairo Fernandez	Colombia	15.35	SB
6	6	Luis Oviedo	Mexico	15.39	
7	1	Juan Ramón Valladares	Venezuela	15.39	SB
8	7	Miguel Jimenez-Vergara	United States	15.44	
