= Cycling at the 2016 Summer Paralympics – Women's road time trial C5 =

Cycling, Women's road time trial C5 at the XV Paralympic Games
- Venue: Flamengo Park
- Dates: 14 September
- Competitors: 9

Medalists
1st place, gold medalist(s)		Sarah Storey	Great Britain
2nd place, silver medalist(s)		Anna Harkowska	Poland
3rd place, bronze medalist(s)		Samantha Bosco	United States

The Women's road time trial C5 road cycling event at the 2016 Summer Paralympics took place on the afternoon of 14 September at Flamengo Park, Pontal. 9 riders competed over two laps of a fifteen kilometre course.

The C5 category is for cyclists with mild upper limb impairment.

== Results ==
Women's road time trial C5. 14 September 2016, Rio.

Rank	Rider	Nationality	Time	Deficit	Avg. Speed (km/h)
1st place, gold medalist(s)	Sarah Storey	Great Britain	27:22.42	0	43.838
2nd place, silver medalist(s)	Anna Harkowska	Poland	28:52.79	01:30.37	41.551
3rd place, bronze medalist(s)	Samantha Bosco	United States	29:04.66	01:42.24	41.269
4	Crystal Lane	Great Britain	29:37.23	02:14.81	40.512
5	Jennifer Schuble	United States	29:47.36	02:24.94	40.283
6	Mariela Delgado	Argentina	29:59.78	02:37.36	40.005
7	Kerstin Brachtendorf	Germany	30:31.46	03:09.04	39.313
8	Nicole Clermont	Canada	30:32.52	03:10.10	39.29
9	Mari-Liis Juul	Estonia	32:11.31	04:48.89	37.28
-	Zhou Jufang	China	DNS	0	0
