= Archery at the 2023 Parapan American Games – Women's individual W1 =

Women's individual W1 at the 2023 Parapan American Games
- Venue: Archery Center
- Date: 19 November 2023
- Competitors: 3 from 3 nations

Medalists
1st place, gold medalist(s)		Tracy Otto	United States
2nd place, silver medalist(s)		Mariela López	Chile

The women's individual W1 competition of the archery events at the 2023 Parapan American Games was held 19 November 2023 at the Archery Center in Santiago, Chile. Due to the event having only three competitors, only gold and silver medals were awarded.

== Schedule ==
Date	Time	Round
19 November 2023	09:00	Ranking Round
19 November 2023	10:06	Semifinals
19 November 2023	11:06	Final

== Results ==
WR world record | AR area record | CR championship record | GR games record | NR national record | OR Olympic record | PB personal best | SB season best | WL world leading (in a given season)

=== Ranking round ===
The results were as follows:

Rank	Archer	Nation	Score	Note
1	Tracy Otto	United States	556	PR
2	Mariela López	Chile	427	
3	Albina Torres	Argentina	250	

=== Competition rounds ===
The results during the final rounds were as follows:

==== Finals ====
Semifinal							Final
							1	T. Otto (USA)	2	2	2	0	1
3	A. Torres (ARG)	2	0	0	0	0	2	M. López (CHI)	0	0	0	2	1
2	M. López (CHI)	0	2	2	2	2
