= Athletics at the 2023 Parapan American Games – Men's 400 metres T47 =

Men's 400 metres T47 at the 2023 Parapan American Games
- Venue: Mario Recordón Athletics Training Center
- Dates: November 21
- Competitors: 7 from 6 nations
- Winning time: 49.94

Medalists
1st place, gold medalist(s)		Daniel Milanes	Cuba
2nd place, silver medalist(s)		Tahmar Upshaw	United States
3rd place, bronze medalist(s)		Rayven Sample	United States

The men's T47 400 metres competition of the athletics events at the 2023 Parapan American Games was held on November 21 at the Mario Recordón Athletics Training Center within the Julio Martínez National Stadium of Santiago, Chile.

== Records ==
Prior to this competition, the existing world and Pan American Games records were as follows:

World record	Ayoud Sandi (MAR)	46.78	Paris, France	July 14, 2023
Parapan American Games record	Ernesto Blanco (CUB)	49.07	Toronto, Canada	August 12, 2015

== Schedule ==
Date	Time	Round
November 21, 2023	18:14	Final

== Results ==
All times shown are in seconds.

KEY:	q	Fastest non-qualifiers	Q	Qualified	PR	Parapan Games record	NR	National record	SB	Seasonal best	DQ	Disqualified

=== Final ===
The results were as follows:

Rank	Lane	Name	Nationality	Time	Notes
1st place, gold medalist(s)	6	Daniel Milanes	Cuba	49.94	SB
2nd place, silver medalist(s)	2	Tahmar Upshaw	United States	50.67	
3rd place, bronze medalist(s)	4	Rayven Sample	United States	50.68	
4	5	Cristian Mejia	Dominican Republic	52.07	
5	3	José Alexandre Martins	Brazil	52.23	
6	8	Gerber Ayala	El Salvador	55.58	SB
	7	Steven Arboleda	Ecuador	DNS	
