= Cycling at the 2023 Parapan American Games – Women's road time trial H1–5 =

Women's road time trial H1–5 at the 2023 Parapan American Games
- Venue: Streets of Isla de Maipo
- Dates: November 19
- Competitors: 6 from 3 nations
- Winning time: 15:14.83

Medalists
1st place, gold medalist(s)		Katerina Brim	United States
2nd place, silver medalist(s)		Jady Martins	Brazil
3rd place, bronze medalist(s)		Jenna Rollman	United States

The women's individual road time trial H1–5 competition of the cycling events at the 2023 Parapan American Games was held on November 19 on the Streets of Isla de Maipo, Chile.

== Schedule ==
Date	Time	Round
November 19, 2023	13:05	Final

== Results ==
The results were as follows:

Rank	Class	Rider	Nation	Time
1st place, gold medalist(s)	H2	Katerina Brim	United States	15:14.83
2nd place, silver medalist(s)	H3	Jady Martins	Brazil	17:44.59
3rd place, bronze medalist(s)	H3	Jenna Rollman	United States	18:32.73
4	H3	Mariana García	Brazil	18:47.04
5	H4	Josiane Nowacki	Brazil	19:51.48
6	H3	Patricia Arleni	Argentina	29:20.19
