= Archery at the 2023 Parapan American Games – Men's individual W1 =

Men's individual W1 at the 2023 Parapan American Games
- Venue: Archery Center
- Dates: November 19 - 22
- Competitors: 4 from 3 nations

Medalists
1st place, gold medalist(s)		Eugênio Franco	Brazil
2nd place, silver medalist(s)		Jason Tabasky	United States
3rd place, bronze medalist(s)		Victor Saiz	Chile

The men's individual W1 competition of the archery events at the 2023 Parapan American Games was held from November 19 to November 22 at the Archery Center in Santiago, Chile.

== Schedule ==
Date	Time	Round
November 19, 2023	19:00	Ranking round
November 20, 2023	10:25	Semifinals
November 22, 2023	09:40	Final

== Results ==
WR world record | AR area record | CR championship record | GR games record | NR national record | OR Olympic record | PB personal best | SB season best | WL world leading (in a given season)

=== Ranking round ===
The results were as follows:

Rank	Archer	Nation	Score	Note
1	Jason Tabansky	United States	640	PR
2	Eugênio Franco	Brazil	607	
3	Víctor Saiz	Chile	571	
4	Lucas Herro	United States	570	

=== Finals ===
The results during the final rounds were as follows:

Semifinals
1	J. Tabansky (USA)	2	2	0	2	1
4	L. Herro (USA)	0	0	2	0	1
3	V. Saiz (CHI)	1	2	2	0	0
2	E. Franco (BRA)	1	0	0	2	2

Finals
1	J. Tabansky (USA)	0	0	0	0	0
2	E. Franco (BRA)	2	2	2	2	2
Third place
4	L. Herro (USA)	0	0	0	2	2
3	V. Saiz (CHI)	2	2	2	0	0
