= Jean Carlos Mina Aponzá =

Colombian paralympic athlete

Sport
- Country: Colombia
- Sport: Para-athletics
Medal record
Representing Colombia
Men's para-athletics
Paralympic Games
Bronze medal – third place	2020 Tokyo	100 m T13
Parapan American Games
Silver medal – second place	2023 Santiago	100 m T13

Jean Carlos Mina Aponzá is a Colombian paralympic athlete. He participated at the 2020 Summer Paralympics in the athletics competition, being awarded the bronze medal in the men's 100 metres event on T13 class, scoring 10.64.
