= Archery at the 2023 Parapan American Games – Mixed team recurve open =

Mixed team recurve open at the 2023 Parapan American Games
- Venue: Archery Center
- Dates: November 19 - November 21
- Competitors: 14 from 7 nations

Medalists
| 1st place, gold medalist(s) | | Candice Caesar; Eric Bennett | United States |
| 2nd place, silver medalist(s) | | Mónica Daza; Héctor Ramírez | Colombia |
| 3rd place, bronze medalist(s) | | Karen Rocha; Samuel Molina | Mexico |

The mixed team recurve open competition of the archery events at the 2023 Parapan American Games was held from November 19 to 21 at the Archery Center in Santiago, Chile.

== Schedule ==
| Date | Time | Round |
|---|---|---|
| November 19, 2023 | 09:00 | Ranking Round |
| November 21, 2023 | 14:05 | Quarterfinals |
| November 21, 2023 | 14:40 | Semifinals |
| November 21, 2023 | 15:20 | Final |

== Results ==
WR world record | AR area record | CR championship record | GR games record | NR national record | OR Olympic record | PB personal best | SB season best | WL world leading (in a given season)

=== Ranking round ===
The results were as follows:

| Rank | Archer | Nation | Individual score | Total | Note |
|---|---|---|---|---|---|
| 1 | Mónica Daza; Héctor Ramírez | Colombia | 523; 621 | 1144 | PR |
| 2 | Karen Rocha; Samuel Molina | Mexico | 494; 642 | 1136 | |
| 3 | Candice Caesar; Eric Bennett | United States | 454; 628 | 1082 | |
| 4 | Daniela Campos; Marco Huaytalla | Peru | 489; 523 | 1012 | |
| 5 | Tercia Figueiredo; Heriberto Roca | Brazil | 424; 587 | 1011 | |
| 6 | Mirta Rodríguez; Simon Chismak | Argentina | 280; 532 | 912 | |
| 7 | Leydis Posada; Alex Capó | Cuba | 416; 391 | 807 | |

=== Competition rounds ===
The results during the elimination rounds and final rounds were as follows:

Quarterfinals
5 | T. Figueiredo (BRA); H. Roca (BRA) | 0 | 0 | 2 | 2 | 0
4 | D. Campos (PER); M. Huaytalla (PER) | 2 | 2 | 0 | 0 | 1
3 | C. Caesar (USA); E. Bennett (USA) | 2 | 2 | 2
6 | M. Rodríguez (ARG); S. Chismak (ARG) | 0 | 0 | 0
7 | L. Posada (CUB); A. Capó (CUB) | 0 | 0 | 2 | 2 | 0
2 | K. Rocha (MEX); S. Molina (MEX) | 2 | 2 | 0 | 0 | 1

Semifinals
1 | M. Daza (COL); H. Ramírez (COL) | 2 | 2 | 2
4 | D. Campos (PER); M. Huaytalla (PER) | 0 | 0 | 0
3 | C. Caesar (USA); E. Bennett (USA) | 2 | 2 | 1
2 | K. Rocha (MEX); S. Molina (MEX) | 0 | 0 | 1

Final
1 | M. Daza (COL); H. Ramírez (COL) | 0 | 0 | 2 | 0
3 | C. Caesar (USA); E. Bennett (USA) | 2 | 2 | 0 | 2
Bronze medal match
4 | D. Campos (PER); M. Huaytalla (PER) | 0 | 0 | 0
2 | K. Rocha (MEX); S. Molina (MEX) | 2 | 2 | 2
