= Wheelchair tennis at the 2023 Parapan American Games =

Wheelchair tennis competitions at the 2023 Parapan American Games

- Wheelchair tennis pictogram
- Venue: Tennis and Racket Sports Training Centre
- Dates: 19 – 25 November 2023
- No. of events: 6 (2 men, 2 women, 2 mixed)
- Competitors: 51 from 13 nations

Tennis at the 2023 Parapan American Games

Champions

Men's singles
- Gustavo Fernández; Argentina

Women's singles
- Dana Mathewson; United States

Men's doubles
- Ezequiel Casco & Gustavo Fernández; Argentina

Women's doubles
- Dana Mathewson & Maylee Phelps; United States

Quad singles
- Francisco Cayulef; Chile

Quad doubles
- Francisco Cayulef & Diego Pérez; Chile
- Parapan American Games

Wheelchair tennis competitions at the 2023 Parapan American Games in Santiago, Chile were held at the Tennis and Racket Sports Training Centre from 19 to 25 November 2023.

The men's and women's singles champions qualified directly for the 2024 Summer Paralympics.

== Participating nations ==
There are 51 players from 13 nations participating.

- Argentina (4)
- Brazil (6)
- Canada (6)
- Chile (6) (Host)
- Colombia (6)
- Costa Rica (4)
- Ecuador (5)
- Guatemala (1)
- Mexico (1)
- Peru (3)
- United States (6)
- Uruguay (1)
- Venezuela (2)

== Medal summary ==
=== Medal table ===
* Host nation (Chile)

| Rank | NPC | Gold | Silver | Bronze | Total |
|---|---|---|---|---|---|
| 1 | Chile (CHI)* | 2 | 1 | 2 | 5 |
| 2 | United States (USA) | 2 | 0 | 1 | 3 |
| 3 | Argentina (ARG) | 2 | 0 | 0 | 2 |
| 4 | Brazil (BRA) | 0 | 3 | 2 | 5 |
| 5 | Colombia (COL) | 0 | 1 | 1 | 2 |
| 6 | Canada (CAN) | 0 | 1 | 0 | 1 |
| Totals (6 entries) | | 6 | 6 | 6 | 18 |

=== Medalists ===
| Event | Gold | Silver | Bronze |
|---|---|---|---|
| Men's singles | Gustavo Fernández; Argentina | Alexander Cataldo; Chile | Daniel Rodrigues; Brazil |
| Men's doubles | Argentina; Ezequiel Casco; Gustavo Fernández | Brazil; Gustavo Carneiro; Daniel Rodrigues | Chile; Alexander Cataldo; Brayan Tapia |
| Women's singles | Dana Mathewson; United States | Angélica Bernal; Colombia | Macarena Cabrillana; Chile |
| Women's doubles | United States; Dana Mathewson; Maylee Phelps | Brazil; Maria Fernanda Alves; Meirycoll Duval | Colombia; Angélica Bernal; Johana Martínez |
| Quad singles | Francisco Cayulef; Chile | Robert Shaw; Canada | Leandro Pena; Brazil |
| Quad doubles | Chile; Francisco Cayulef; Diego Pérez | Brazil; Leandro Pena; Ymanitu Silva | United States; Andrew Bogdanov; David Wagner |

== See also ==
- Tennis at the 2023 Pan American Games
- Wheelchair tennis at the 2024 Summer Paralympics
