= Judo at the 2023 Parapan American Games – Men's 60 kg =

Men's 60 kg at the 2023 Parapan American Games
- Venue: Contact Sports Center
- Dates: November 19
- Competitors: 10 from 9 nations

Medalists
1st place, gold medalist(s)		Thiego Marques	Brazil
2nd place, silver medalist(s)		Elielton Lira	Brazil
3rd place, bronze medalist(s)		Henry Borges	Uruguay
3rd place, bronze medalist(s)		Bryan Aburto	Mexico

The men's 60 kg competition of the judo events at the 2023 Parapan American Games was held on November 20 at the Contact Sports Center (Centro de Entrenamiento de los Deportes de Contacto) in Santiago, Chile. A total of ten athletes from nine NOCs competed.

== Results ==
=== Repechage ===
Repechage 1
Johann Herrera (CHI)	01
Marcos Blanco (VEN)	00

Repechage 2
Ronald Hawthorne (USA)	00
Bryan Aburto (MEX)	11
David Gomez (ARG)	10
Johann Herrera (CHI)	00

Bronze metal match
Bryan Aburto (MEX)	10
Yonaldy González (CUB)	00
David Gomez (ARG)	00
Henry Borges (URU)	10

=== Main Bracket ===
Round of 16
Johann Herrera (CHI)	00
Yonaldy González (CUB)	10

Quarterfinals
Thiego Marques (BRA)	10
Ronald Hawthorne (USA)	00
Henry Borges (URU)	10
Bryan Aburto (MEX)	00
Elielton Lira (BRA)	10
David Gomez (ARG)	00
Marcos Blanco (VEN)	00
Yonaldy González (CUB)	10

Semifinals
Thiego Marques (BRA)	10
Henry Borges (URU)	00
Elielton Lira (BRA)	10
Yonaldy González (CUB)	00

Final
Thiego Marques (BRA)	10
Elielton Lira (BRA)	00
