= Athletics at the 2023 Parapan American Games – Men's 400 metres T54 =

Men's 400 metres T54 at the 2023 Parapan American Games
- Venue: Mario Recordón Athletics Training Center
- Dates: November 23
- Competitors: 11 from 7 nations
- Winning time: 47.74

Medalists
1st place, gold medalist(s)		Juan Pablo Cervantes	Mexico
2nd place, silver medalist(s)		Cristian Ribera	Brazil
3rd place, bronze medalist(s)		Evan Correll	United States

The men's T54 400 metres competition of the athletics events at the 2023 Parapan American Games was held on November 23 at the Mario Recordón Athletics Training Center within the Julio Martínez National Stadium of Santiago, Chile.

== Records ==
Prior to this competition, the existing world and Pan American Games records were as follows:

World record	Yassine Gharbi (TUN)	43.46	Sharjah, United Arab Emirates	March 19, 2018
Parapan American Games record	Fernando Sanchez (MEX)	48.86	Rio de Janeiro, Brazil	August 16, 2007
Americas record	Daniel Romanchuk (USA)	43.51	Tokyo, Japan	August 26, 2021

== Schedule ==
Date	Time	Round
November 23, 2023	16:58	Semifinal
November 23, 2023	19:24	Final

== Results ==
All times shown are in seconds.

KEY:	q	Fastest non-qualifiers	Q	Qualified	PR	Parapan Games record	NR	National record	SB	Seasonal best	DQ	Disqualified

=== Semifinals ===
The fastest two athletes of each semifinal advance to the final. The results were as follows:

Rank	Heat	Name	Nationality	Time	Notes
1	2	Juan Pablo Cervantes	Mexico	48.41	Q, PR
2	2	Evan Correll	United States	48.57	Q, SB
3	2	Fernando Sanchez	Mexico	48.82	Q
4	1	Cristian Ribera	Brazil	48.97	Q
5	1	Miguel Jimenez-Vergara	United States	49.14	Q
6	1	Isaiah Christophe	Canada	50.42	Q
7	1	Sairo Fernández	Colombia	51.06	q
8	2	Juan Ramón Valladares	Venezuela	51.32	q
9	1	Luis Oviedo	Mexico	52.12	
10	2	Jason Robinson	United States	54.32	
	2	Laurens Molina	Costa Rica	DQ	

=== Final ===
The results were as follows:

Rank	Lane	Name	Nationality	Time	Notes
1st place, gold medalist(s)	5	Juan Pablo Cervantes	Mexico	47.74	PR
2nd place, silver medalist(s)	4	Cristian Ribera	Brazil	47.85	
3rd place, bronze medalist(s)	6	Evan Correll	United States	48.05	SB
4	7	Fernando Sanchez	Mexico	48.23	
5	3	Miguel Jimenez-Vergara	United States	48.93	
6	8	Isaiah Christophe	Canada	49.53	
7	2	Juan Ramón Valladares	Venezuela	50.64	
8	1	Sairo Fernández	Colombia	51.48	
