= Athletics at the 2023 Parapan American Games – Men's 1500 metres T54 =

Men's 1500 metres T54 at the 2023 Parapan American Games
- Venue: Mario Recordón Athletics Training Center
- Dates: November 25
- Competitors: 7 from 5 nations
- Winning time: 3:09.69

Medalists
1st place, gold medalist(s)		Miguel Jimenez-Vergara	United States
2nd place, silver medalist(s)		Cristian Ribera	Brazil
3rd place, bronze medalist(s)		Fernando Sanchez	Mexico

The men's T54 1500 metres competition of the athletics events at the 2023 Parapan American Games was held on November 25 at the Mario Recordón Athletics Training Center within the Julio Martínez National Stadium of Santiago, Chile.

== Records ==
Prior to this competition, the existing world and Pan American Games records were as follows:

World record	Marcel Hug (SUI)	2:43.37	Dubai, United Arab Emirates	February 27, 2023
Parapan American Games record	Saúl Mendoza (MEX)	3:01.97	Mar del Plata, Argentina	December 8, 2013
Americas record	Brent Lakatos (CAN)	2:44.87	Nottwil, Switzerland	May 27, 2023

== Schedule ==
Date	Time	Round
November 25, 2023	16:31	Final

== Results ==
All times shown are in seconds.

KEY:	q	Fastest non-qualifiers	Q	Qualified	PR	Parapan Games record	NR	National record	SB	Seasonal best	DQ	Disqualified

=== Final ===
The results were as follows:

Rank	Lane	Name	Nationality	Time	Notes
1st place, gold medalist(s)	1	Miguel Jimenez-Vergara	United States	3:09.69	
2nd place, silver medalist(s)	5	Cristian Ribera	Brazil	3:10.18	SB
3rd place, bronze medalist(s)	2	Fernando Sanchez	Mexico	3:10.30	
4	3	Evan Correll	United States	3:10.32	
5	6	Phillip Croft	United States	3:10.63	
6	7	Eduardo Dutra	Uruguay	3:11.82	SB
7	4	Sairo Fernández	Colombia	3:21.74	
