= Athletics at the 2023 Parapan American Games – Men's 400 metres T53 =

Men's 400 metres T53 at the 2023 Parapan American Games
- Venue: Mario Recordón Athletics Training Center
- Dates: November 23
- Competitors: 6 from 3 nations
- Winning time: 51.10

Medalists
1st place, gold medalist(s)		Ariosvaldo Fernandes	Brazil
2nd place, silver medalist(s)		Phillip Croft	United States
3rd place, bronze medalist(s)		Robert Hunt	United States

The men's T53 400 metres competition of the athletics events at the 2023 Parapan American Games was held on November 23 at the Mario Recordón Athletics Training Center within the Julio Martínez National Stadium of Santiago, Chile.

== Records ==
Prior to this competition, the existing world and Pan American Games records were as follows:

World record	Pongsakorn Paeyo (THA)	46.11	Paris, France	July 11, 2023
Parapan American Games record	Brent Lakatos (CAN)	48.91	Toronto, France	August 14, 2015
Americas record	Brent Lakatos (CAN)	46.22	Paris, France	July 11, 2023

== Schedule ==
Date	Time	Round
November 23, 2023	19:17	Final

== Results ==
All times shown are in seconds.

KEY:	q	Fastest non-qualifiers	Q	Qualified	PR	Parapan Games record	NR	National record	SB	Seasonal best	DQ	Disqualified

=== Final ===
The results were as follows:

Rank	Lane	Name	Nationality	Time	Notes
1st place, gold medalist(s)	6	Ariosvaldo Fernandes	Brazil	51.10	
2nd place, silver medalist(s)	3	Phillip Croft	United States	52.23	SB
3rd place, bronze medalist(s)	5	Robert Hunt	United States	52.48	SB
4	7	Fidel Aguilar	Mexico	54.48	
5	4	José Miguel Pulido	Mexico	DQ	
6	8	Alexis Gayosso	Mexico	DQ	
