= Athletics at the 2023 Parapan American Games – Men's 5000 metres T54 =

Men's 5000 metres T54 at the 2023 Parapan American Games
- Venue: Mario Recordón Athletics Training Center
- Dates: November 21
- Competitors: 4 from 2 nations
- Winning time: 11:05.75

Medalists
1st place, gold medalist(s)		Evan Correll	United States
2nd place, silver medalist(s)		Miguel Jimenez-Vergara	United States
3rd place, bronze medalist(s)		Phillip Croft	United States

The men's T54 5000 metres competition of the athletics events at the 2023 Parapan American Games was held on November 21 at the Mario Recordón Athletics Training Center within the Julio Martínez National Stadium of Santiago, Chile.

== Records ==
Prior to this competition, the existing world and Pan American Games records were as follows:

World record	Marcel Hug (SUI)	9:15.26	Nottwil, Switzerland	May 26, 2023
Parapan American Games record	Saúl Mendoza (MEX)	10:36.57	Mar del Plata, Argentina	December 9, 2003

== Schedule ==
Date	Time	Round
November 21, 2023	16:45	Final

== Results ==
All times shown are in seconds.

KEY:	q	Fastest non-qualifiers	Q	Qualified	PR	Parapan Games record	NR	National record	SB	Seasonal best	DQ	Disqualified

=== Final ===
The results were as follows:

Rank	Lane	Name	Nationality	Time	Notes
1st place, gold medalist(s)	2	Evan Correll	United States	11:05.75	
2nd place, silver medalist(s)	1	Miguel Jimenez-Vergara	United States	11:06.73	
3rd place, bronze medalist(s)	3	Phillip Croft	United States	11:26.86	
4	4	Juan Ramón Valladares	Venezuela	12:58.82	
