= Athletics at the 2023 Parapan American Games – Men's 100 metres T13 =

Men's 100 metres T13 at the 2023 Parapan American Games
- Venue: Mario Recordón Athletics Training Center
- Dates: November 23
- Competitors: 8 from 6 nations
- Winning time: 10.99

Medalists
| 1st place, gold medalist(s) | | Fabricio Barros | Brazil |
| 2nd place, silver medalist(s) | | Jean Carlos Mina Aponzá | Colombia |
| 3rd place, bronze medalist(s) | | Stirley Jones Jr. | United States |

The men's T13 100 metres competition of the athletics events at the 2023 Parapan American Games was held on November 23 at the Mario Recordón Athletics Training Center within the Julio Martínez National Stadium of Santiago, Chile.

== Records ==
Prior to this competition, the existing world and Pan American Games records were as follows:

| World record | Salum Kashafali (NOR) | 10.37 | Oslo, Norway | June 15, 2023 |
| Parapan American Games record | Luis Felipe Gutiérrez (CUB) | 10.86 | Guadalajara, Mexico | November 14, 2011 |
| Americas record | Jean Carlos Mina Aponzá (COL) | 10.64 | Tokyo, Japan | August 29, 2021 |

== Schedule ==
| Date | Time | Round |
|---|---|---|
| November 23, 2023 | 15:19 | Final |

== Results ==
All times shown are in seconds.

| KEY: | q | Fastest non-qualifiers | Q | Qualified | PR | Parapan Games record | NR | National record | SB | Seasonal best | DQ | Disqualified |

=== Final ===
The results were as follows:
Wind: -0.7 m/s

| Rank | Lane | Name | Nationality | Time | Notes |
|---|---|---|---|---|---|
| 1st place, gold medalist(s) | 6 | Fabricio Barros | Brazil | 10.99 | |
| 2nd place, silver medalist(s) | 3 | Jean Carlos Mina Aponzá | Colombia | 11.09 | |
| 3rd place, bronze medalist(s) | 5 | Stirley Jones Jr. | United States | 11.39 | |
| 4 | 2 | Yosmer Rojas | Venezuela | 11.52 | |
| 5 | 4 | Paulo Henrique Andrade | Brazil | 11.61 | |
| 6 | 7 | Mario Chessani | Mexico | 11.92 | |
| 7 | 1 | Derri Batiz | Honduras | 13.83 | |
| | 8 | Markeith Price | United States | DNS | |
