= Athletics at the 2023 Parapan American Games – Men's 100 metres T53 =

Men's 100 metres T53 at the 2023 Parapan American Games
- Venue: Mario Recordón Athletics Training Center
- Dates: November 24
- Competitors: 6 from 3 nations
- Winning time: 14.92

Medalists
1st place, gold medalist(s)		Ariosvaldo Fernandes	Brazil
2nd place, silver medalist(s)		Robert Hunt	United States
3rd place, bronze medalist(s)		Phillip Croft	United States

The men's T53 100 metres competition of the athletics events at the 2023 Parapan American Games was held on November 24 at the Mario Recordón Athletics Training Center within the Julio Martínez National Stadium of Santiago, Chile.

== Records ==
Prior to this competition, the existing world and Pan American Games records were as follows:

World record	Brent Lakatos (CAN)	14.10	Arbon, Switzerland	May 27, 2017
Parapan American Games record	Ariosvaldo Fernandes (BRA)	15.08	Guadalajara, Mexico	November 15, 2011
Americas record	Brent Lakatos (CAN)	14.10	Arbon, Switzerland	May 27, 2017

== Schedule ==
Date	Time	Round
November 25, 2023	19:39	Final

== Results ==
All times shown are in seconds.

KEY:	q	Fastest non-qualifiers	Q	Qualified	PR	Parapan Games record	NR	National record	SB	Seasonal best	DQ	Disqualified

=== Final ===
The results were as follows:
Wind: +1.1 m/s

Rank	Lane	Name	Nationality	Time	Notes
1st place, gold medalist(s)	5	Ariosvaldo Fernandes	Brazil	14.92	PR
2nd place, silver medalist(s)	6	Robert Hunt	United States	15.43	SB
3rd place, bronze medalist(s)	3	Phillip Croft	United States	15.79	SB
4	4	Alexis Gayosso	Mexico	16.01	
5	7	Fidel Aguilar	Mexico	16.46	
6	8	José Miguel Pulido	Mexico	16.49	SB
