= Athletics at the 2023 Parapan American Games – Men's 100 metres T11 =

Men's 100 metres T11 at the 2023 Parapan American Games
- Venue: Mario Recordón Athletics Training Center
- Dates: November 24 - November 25
- Competitors: 8 from 4 nations
- Winning time: 11.40

Medalists
1st place, gold medalist(s)		Enderson Santos; Guide: Eugrid Maza	Venezuela
2nd place, silver medalist(s)		Daniel Silva; Guide: Wendel de Souza	Brazil
3rd place, bronze medalist(s)		Antoine Craig; Guide: Treyton Harris	United States

The men's T11 100 metres competition of the athletics events at the 2023 Parapan American Games was held on November 24 - 25 at the Mario Recordón Athletics Training Center within the Julio Martínez National Stadium of Santiago, Chile.

== Records ==
Prior to this competition, the existing world and Pan American Games records were as follows:

World record	Athanasios Ghavelas (GRE)	10.82	Tokyo, Japan	September 2, 2021
Parapan American Games record	David Brown (USA)	10.95	Toronto, Canada	August 11, 2015
Americas record	David Brown (USA)	10.92	Walnut, United States	April 18, 2014

== Schedule ==
Date	Time	Round
November 24, 2023	20:15	Semifinals
November 25, 2023	15:51	Final

== Results ==
All times shown are in seconds.

KEY:	q	Fastest non-qualifiers	Q	Qualified	PR	Parapan Games record	NR	National record	SB	Seasonal best	DQ	Disqualified

=== Semifinals ===
The fastest two athletes of each semifinal advance to the final. The results were as follows:

Rank	Heat	Name	Nationality	Time	Notes
1	1	Antoine Craig; Guide: Treyton Harris	United States	11.39	Q, SB
2	2	Daniel Silva; Guide: Wendel de Souza	Brazil	11.54	Q
3	1	Enderson Santos; Guide: Eugrid Maza	Venezuela	11.61	q
4	2	David Brown; Guide: Je'von Hutchison	United States	11.83	q
5	2	José de Jesús Flores; Guide: Javier Carrillo	Mexico	12.13	
6	2	Yasser Guzmán; Guide: Cristian Valdez	Mexico	12.29	
7	1	Oscar Sánchez; Guide: Adrian Marquez	Mexico	12.60	SB
8	1	Felipe Gomes; Guide: Jonas de Lima	Brazil	DNS	

=== Final ===
The results were as follows:

Rank	Lane	Name	Nationality	Time	Notes
1st place, gold medalist(s)	7	Enderson Santos; Guide: Eugrid Maza	Venezuela	11.40	SB
2nd place, silver medalist(s)	3	Daniel Silva; Guide: Wendel de Souza	Brazil	11.52	SB
3rd place, bronze medalist(s)	5	Antoine Craig; Guide: Treyton Harris	United States	11.56	
4	1	David Brown; Guide: Je'von Hutchison	United States	11.97	
