= Athletics at the 2023 Parapan American Games – Men's 800 metres T53/54 =

Men's 800 metres T53/T54 at the 2023 Parapan American Games
- Venue: Mario Recordón Athletics Training Center
- Dates: November 21 - November 22
- Competitors: 13 from 6 nations
- Winning time: 1:36.29

Medalists
1st place, gold medalist(s)		Fernando Sanchez	Mexico
2nd place, silver medalist(s)		Miguel Jimenez-Vergara	United States
3rd place, bronze medalist(s)		Cristian Ribera	Brazil

The men's T53/T54 800 metres competition of the athletics events at the 2023 Parapan American Games was held on November 21 - 22 at the Mario Recordón Athletics Training Center within the Julio Martínez National Stadium of Santiago, Chile.

== Schedule ==
Date	Time	Round
November 21, 2023	19:22	Semifinals
November 22, 2023	18:04	Final

== Results ==
All times shown are in seconds.

KEY:	q	Fastest non-qualifiers	Q	Qualified	PR	Parapan Games record	NR	National record	SB	Seasonal best	DQ	Disqualified

=== Semifinals ===
The fastest two athletes of each semifinal advance to the final. The results were as follows:

Rank	Heat	Class	Name	Nationality	Time	Notes
1	2	T54	Fernando Sanchez	Mexico	1:37.83	Q
2	2	T54	Miguel Jimenez-Vergara	United States	1:38.12	Q, SB
3	2	T54	Juan Pablo Cervantes	Mexico	1:38.54	Q
4	2	T54	Cristian Ribera	Brazil	1:38.59	q, SB
5	1	T54	Evan Correll	United States	1:39.96	Q
6	1	T54	Luis Oviedo	Mexico	1:42.03	Q
7	1	T54	Sairo Fernández	Colombia	1:42.24	Q
8	1	T53	Phillip Croft	United States	1:45.81	q
9	1	T54	Juan Ramón Valladares	Venezuela	1:46.23	
10	1	T53	José Miguel Pulido	Mexico	1:47.97	
11	2	T54	Jason Robinson	United States	1:48.36	
12	1	T53	Fidel Aguilar	Mexico	1:52.35	
	2	T54	Eduardo Dutra	Uruguay	DQ	

=== Final ===
The results were as follows:

Rank	Lane	Class	Name	Nationality	Time	Notes
1st place, gold medalist(s)	3	T54	Fernando Sanchez	Mexico	1:36.29	
2nd place, silver medalist(s)	5	T54	Miguel Jimenez-Vergara	United States	1:36.53	SB
3rd place, bronze medalist(s)	1	T54	Cristian Ribera	Brazil	1:36.61	SB
4	4	T54	Evan Correll	United States	1:37.71	SB
5	7	T54	Juan Pablo Cervantes	Mexico	1:39.02	
6	8	T54	Sairo Fernández	Colombia	1:39.68	
7	2	T53	Phillip Croft	United States	1:41.40	SB
8	6	T54	Luis Oviedo	Mexico	1:42.68	
