= Jack O'Neil (swimmer) =

American Paralympic swimmer

Personal information
- Nationality: American
- Born: March 19, 2003 (age 23)
- Home town: Colorado Springs, Colorado, U.S.

Sport
- Sport: Paralympic swimming
- Disability class: S8
- College team: University of Wyoming
- Coached by: Dave Denniston
Medal record
Men's paralympic swimming
Representing the United States
Parapan American Games
Silver medal – second place	2023 Santiago	100 m backstroke S8
Silver medal – second place	2023 Santiago	4 × 100 m freestyle relay 34 pts
Silver medal – second place	2023 Santiago	4 × 100 m medley relay 34 pts

Jack O'Neil (born March 19, 2003) is an American Paralympic swimmer. He will represent the United States at the 2024 Summer Paralympics.

== Career ==
He qualified for the 2024 Summer Paralympics in swimming. He competed at the 2024 US Paralympic Swimming Team Trials in Minneapolis where he placed first in the 100 meter backstroke.
