= Yan Xiao Gong =

American paralympic sport shooter

Personal information
- Born: December 31, 1997 (age 28) China

Sport
- Country: United States
- Sport: Paralympic shooting
Medal record
Men's shooting para sport
Representing United States
Paralympic Games
| Silver medal – second place | 2024 Paris | Mixed 25 m pistol SH1 |
World Championships
| Gold medal – first place | 2023 Lima | 25m Pistol SH1 |
| Bronze medal – third place | 2023 Lima | 10m Air Pistol SH1 |
Parapan American Games
| Gold medal – first place | 2023 Santiago | 25 m pistol |
| Bronze medal – third place | 2023 Santiago | Men's 10 m air pistol |

Yan Xiao Gong (born December 31, 1997) is an American paralympic sport shooter. He is a silver medalist in the 2024 Summer Paralympics in the shooting competition. He has also competed in the World Shooting Para Sports Championships and the Parapan American Games, winning medals in both.

== Early life ==
From a young age, he had been fascinated with antique guns due to the older movies he watched. He was severely injured in his back while surfing.

== Career ==
Gong competed the World Championships in September 2023, winning the gold medal in the 25 m pistol and the bronze medal in the 10 m air pistol, which earned him the U.S. Paralympic Quota for the 2024 Summer Paralympics. Two months later, he competed in the 2023 Parapan American Games, winning gold medal in the 25 m pistol and the bronze medal in the men's 10 metre air pistol.

Gong participated at the 2024 Summer Paralympics in the shooting competition, being awarded the silver in the mixed 25 m pistol.
