= Keegan Knott =

American Paralympic swimmer (born 2005)

Personal information
- Born: 11 July 2005 (age 20) Lake Villa, Illinois, U.S.
- Home town: Gurnee, Illinois, U.S.

Sport
- Country: United States
- Sport: Paralympic swimming
- Disability: Fibular hemimelia
- Disability class: S9, SB8, SM9
- Club: Northern Arizona University
Medal record
Paralympic swimming
Representing United States
Parapan American Games
Gold medal – first place	2023 Santiago	400m freestyle S9
Silver medal – second place	2023 Santiago	200m individual medley SM9
Bronze medal – third place	2023 Santiago	100m backstroke S9

Keegan Knott (born 11 July 2005) is an American Paralympic swimmer who competes in international swimming competitions. She is a Parapan American Games champion and has competed at the 2020 Summer Paralympics where she was the youngest member of the team.
