= Evan Wilkerson =

American paralympic swimmer (born 2006)

Personal information
- Nationality: American
- Born: September 28, 2006 (age 19) Wake Forest, North Carolina, U.S.

Sport
- Sport: Paralympic swimming
- Disability: Leber congenital amaurosis
- Disability class: S12, SB12
- Coached by: Zach Murray
Medal record
Men's paralympic swimming
Representing the United States
World Championships
Bronze medal – third place	2025 Singapore	100 m backstroke S12
Parapan American Games
Silver medal – second place	2023 Santiago	100 m backstroke S12
Bronze medal – third place	2023 Santiago	100 m breaststroke SB12

Evan Wilkerson (born September 28, 2006) is an American Paralympic swimmer. He represented the United States at the 2024 Summer Paralympics.

== Early life ==
Wilkerson was born to Traci and Gene Wilkerson and has a sister, Olivia. Wilkerson and his sister are both para swimmers with leber congenital amaurosis.

He attended North Carolina Virtual Public School.

== Career ==
On September 25, 2023, Wilkerson was named to team USA's roster to compete at the 2023 Parapan American Games. He made his international debut at the event and won a silver medal in the 100 meter backstroke S12 and a bronze medal in the 100 meter breaststroke SB12 events.

On June 30, 2024, Wilkerson was named to team USA's roster to compete at the 2024 Summer Paralympics. He competed in the 100 metre freestyle S12, 100 metre backstroke S12, 100 metre butterfly S12, and mixed 4 × 100 metre freestyle relay 49pts events, but didn't medal. He made his World Para Swimming Championships debut in 2025 and won a bronze medal in the 100 metre backstroke S12 event.
