= Shooting at the 2023 Parapan American Games =

Shooting competitions at the 2023 Parapan American Games

- Shooting pictogram
- Venue: Polígono de Tiro de Pudahuel
- Dates: 18 – 21 November 2023
- No. of events: 9 (1 men, 1 women, 7 mixed)
- Competitors: 42 from 13 nations

Shooting competitions at the 2023 Parapan American Games in Santiago, Chile were held between 18 and 21 November 2023 at the Polígono de Tiro de Pudahuel, located in Pudahuel.

The top shooter, not already qualified, in men's and women's pistol events, together with the top shooter, not already qualified, in two mixed rifle events, earned a qualification spot for the 2024 Summer Paralympics.

== Participating nations ==
There are 42 sports shooters from 13 nations participating.

- Argentina (3)
- Brazil (8)
- Canada (2)
- Chile (3) (Host)
- Colombia (4)
- Costa Rica (1)
- Cuba (3)
- Mexico (2)
- Panama (1)
- Peru (3)
- Puerto Rico (1)
- United States (10)
- Uruguay (1)

== Medal summary ==
=== Medal table ===
* Host nation (Chile)

Rank	NPC	Gold	Silver	Bronze	Total
1	United States (USA)	3	1	3	7
2	Brazil (BRA)	2	2	2	6
3	Cuba (CUB)	2	2	0	4
4	Colombia (COL)	2	0	0	2
5	Peru (PER)	0	2	2	4
6	Costa Rica (CRC)	0	1	0	1
6	Uruguay (URU)	0	1	0	1
8	Argentina (ARG)	0	0	2	2
Totals (8 entries)		9	9	9	27

=== Medalists ===
==== Men's events ====
Event	Class	Gold	Silver	Bronze
P1 10 m air pistol	SH1	Marco De La Rosa; United States	Di Angelo Loriga; Cuba	Yanxiao Gong; United States

==== Women's events ====
Event	Class	Gold	Silver	Bronze
P2 10 m air pistol	SH1	Yenigladys Suárez; Cuba	Paola Arana; Costa Rica	Débora Campos; Brazil

==== Mixed events ====
Event	Class	Gold	Silver	Bronze
P3 25 m pistol	SH1	Yanxiao Gong; United States	Marco De La Rosa; United States	Michael Tagliapietra; United States
P4 50 m pistol	SH1	Yenigladys Suárez; Cuba	Di Angelo Loriga; Cuba	Geraldo von Rosenthal; Brazil
R1/R2 10 m air rifle standing	SH1	Marcelo Marton; Brazil	Jorge Arcela; Peru	Milagros Palomino; Peru
R3 10 m air rifle prone	SH1	María Restrepo; Colombia	Milagros Palomino; Peru	Jorge Arcela; Peru
R6 50 m rifle prone	SH1	María Restrepo; Colombia	Carlos Garletti; Brazil	Kevin Nguyen; United States
R4 10 m air rifle standing	SH2	Alexandre Galgani; Brazil	Carmelo Milan; Uruguay	María Rodríguez; Argentina
R5 10 m air rifle prone	SH2	Stetson Bardfield; United States	Alexandre Galgani; Brazil	María Rodríguez; Argentina

== See also ==
- Shooting at the 2023 Pan American Games
- Shooting at the 2024 Summer Paralympics
