= Marcelo Casanova =

Brazilian Paralympic judoka (born 2003)

Personal information
- Full name: Marcelo Adriano de Azevedo Casanova
- Born: 1 September 2003 (age 22) Caxias do Sul, Brazil
- Occupation: Judoka

Sport
- Country: Brazil
- Sport: Para judo
- Disability class: J2
- Weight class: 90 kg
Medal record
Men's para judo
Representing Brazil
Paralympic Games
Bronze medal – third place	2024 Paris	90 kg J2
Parapan American Games
Gold medal – first place	2023 Santiago	90 kg

Profile at external databases
- IJF: 61079
- JudoInside.com: 156246

Marcelo Adriano de Azevedo Casanova (born 1 September 2003) is a Brazilian Paralympic judoka. He represented Brazil at the 2024 Summer Paralympics.

== Career ==
Casanova competed at the 2023 Parapan American Games and won a gold medal in the 90 kg event.

Casanova represented Brazil at the 2024 Summer Paralympics and won a bronze medal in the 90 kg J2 event.
