= Jason Tabansky =

American Paralympic archer

Personal information
- Born: August 28, 1983 (age 42) Brownsville, Texas, United States

Sport
- Country: United States
- Sport: Archery
Medal record
Men's para-archery
Representing United States
Paralympic Games
Gold medal – first place	2024 Paris	Individual W1
World Championships
Silver medal – second place	2025 Gwangju	Individual W1
Parapan American Games
Silver medal – second place	2023 Santiago	Individual W1

Jason Tabansky (born August 28, 1983) is an American archer, who won gold in the individual W1 at the 2024 Summer Paralympics in Paris.
