= Yaseen El-Demerdash =

American paralympic swimmer (born 2003)

Personal information
- Nationality: American
- Born: September 12, 2003 (age 22) Houston, Texas, U.S.
- Height: 6'2

Sport
- Sport: Paralympic swimming
- Disability: Poland syndrome
- Disability class: S10, SB9, SM10
Medal record
Men's paralympic swimming
Representing the United States
Parapan American Games
Gold medal – first place	2023 Santiago	100 m backstroke S10
Silver medal – second place	2023 Santiago	100 m freestyle S10
Silver medal – second place	2023 Santiago	4 × 100 m freestyle relay 34 pts
Bronze medal – third place	2023 Santiago	50 m freestyle S10

Yaseen El-Demerdash (born September 12, 2003) is an American former para swimmer. He represented the United States at the 2024 Summer Paralympics.

== Early life and education ==
El-Demerdash attended Blue Valley Southwest High School where he was a high school All-American in the 100 breaststroke and was named The Kansas City Star Scholar-Athlete of the Year in 2021. Having skipped a grade, he graduated high school at 17. He graduated from the University of Kansas with a degree in mechanical engineering.

== Career ==
On September 25, 2023, El-Demerdash was named to team USA's roster to compete at the 2023 Parapan American Games. At the Parapan American Games he won a gold medal in the 100 meter backstroke, silver medals in 100 meter freestyle and 4 × 100 m freestyle relay and a bronze medal in the 50 meter freestyle S10 event.

On June 30, 2024, he was named to team USA's roster to compete at the 2024 Summer Paralympics. In July 2026, he announced his retirement from competitive swimming.

== Personal life ==
El-Demerdash was born to Dina Massoud and Aref El-Demerdash and has three siblings, Maryam, Yusuf and Adam. He was born with Poland syndrome, which stunted the development of his right hand and arm and left him without a right pectoral muscle.

In 2025, following his participation in the Paralympic Games, he founded the 501(c)(3) nonprofit, Ripple Affect Foundation. With a board of active and retired Olympians and Paralympians, Ripple Affect provides training stipends to athletes and make sports more accessible and inclusive.
