= Tracy Otto =

American Paralympic archer (born 1995)

Personal information
- Born: November 28, 1995 (age 30) Chicago, Illinois, U.S.
- Home town: Plant City, Florida, U.S.
- Education: University of Tampa

Sport
- Country: United States
- Sport: Para-archery
- Disability: Quadriplegic
- Disability class: W1
Medal record
Para-archery
Representing the United States
Parapan American Games
Gold medal – first place	2023 Santiago	Individual W1

Tracy Otto (born November 28, 1995) is an American Paralympic archer. She represented the United States at the 2024 Summer Paralympics.

== Career ==
Otto began practicing para-archery in March 2021.

Otto made her international debut for the United States at the 2023 World Para Archery Championships where she finished in ninth place. In November 2023 she represented the United States at the 2023 Parapan American Games where she won a gold medal in the individual W1 event. She then competed at the 2024 Para Pan American Championships in April 2024 and won a gold medal in the mixed team W1 with Jason Tabansky, and a gold medal in the individual W1 event.

On May 13, 2024, she was named to the roster to represent the United States at the 2024 Summer Paralympics.

Otto finished eighth in the Paralympic women's individual W1 event. She again competed with Jason Tabansky in the Paralympic mixed team W1 event, where the duo finished sixth.

Otto aims to compete in the 2028 Summer Paralympics in Los Angeles.

== Personal life ==
Otto is from Florida. Before October 2019, Otto was an "aspiring fitness model".

On October 24, 2019, Otto's ex-boyfriend, Francpiero Del Medico, broke into her home and attacked Otto and her new boyfriend, Rick Riessle. Riessle was shot eight times with a pellet gun and stabbed in the back puncturing his lung. Otto was shot five times and stabbed in the back of the neck. One pellet so severely damaged her left eye, surgeons had to remove it. He also shot a pellet down her throat, and sexually assaulted her with the weapon while firing it as he did. As a result of the attack, Otto was left paralyzed from the chest down, making her a C5 quadriplegic. She uses a wheelchair.

Following her rehabilitation, Otto's family placed her in a nursing home in Chicago. Riessle brought Otto back to Florida, where he is now her full-time caregiver and arrow agent. In September 2024, Otto announced her engagement to Riessle and that she was pregnant, with her due date in January.

== Awards ==
In December 2024, Tracy Otto was included on the BBC's 100 Women list.
