= Katie Davis (judoka) =

American Paralympic judoka

Personal information
- Full name: Katie Lee Davis
- Born: 25 July 1986 (age 39) Sacramento, California, United States
- Height: 5 ft 10 in (178 cm)

Sport
- Country: United States
- Sport: Paralympic judo
- Disability: Aniridia
- Coached by: Mike Davis
Medal record
Paralympic judo
Representing United States
IBSA World Judo Championships
Silver medal – second place	2011 Antalya	Women's -78kg
Parapan American Games
Silver medal – second place	2011 Guadalajara	Women's +78kg
Bronze medal – third place	2019 Lima	Women's +78kg
IBSA Pan Am Championships
Bronze medal – third place	2018 Calgary	Women's +78kg

Katie Lee Davis (born July 25, 1986) is an American Paralympic judoka who competes in international level events. She is a double Parapan American Games medalist and a World silver medalist in the heavyweight category.
