= Joel Gomez (athlete) =

American Paralympic runner (born 2003)

Personal information
- Born: 29 July 2003 (age 22) Encinitas, California, United States

Sport
- Sport: Paralympic athletics
- Disability: Blue cone monochromacy
- Disability class: T13
- Event: 1500 metres
- Club: Purdue Boilermakers
Medal record
Representing United States
World Championships
Gold medal – first place	2025 New Delhi	1500 m T13
World Junior Championships
Gold medal – first place	2019 Nottwil	400m T13
Gold medal – first place	2019 Nottwil	1500m T13
Parapan American Games
Gold medal – first place	2023 Santiago	1500m T13
Silver medal – second place	2019 Lima	1500m T13

Joel Gomez (born July 29, 2003) is an American Paralympic middle-distance runner who competes in international track and field competitions. He is a Parapan American Games champion and a double World junior champion in middle-distance running.

== Career ==
Gomez has also competed at the 2020 and 2024 Summer Paralympics, he set a new Americas record in the men's 1500m T13 at the 2024 Paralympics where he finished in seventh place.

Gomez took up soccer at a young age but he had great difficulty tracking the ball, he took up track and field aged nine. When he was in eighth grade, he broke the 5:00 minute mile marker.
