= Samantha Bosco =

American Paralympic athlete (born 1987)

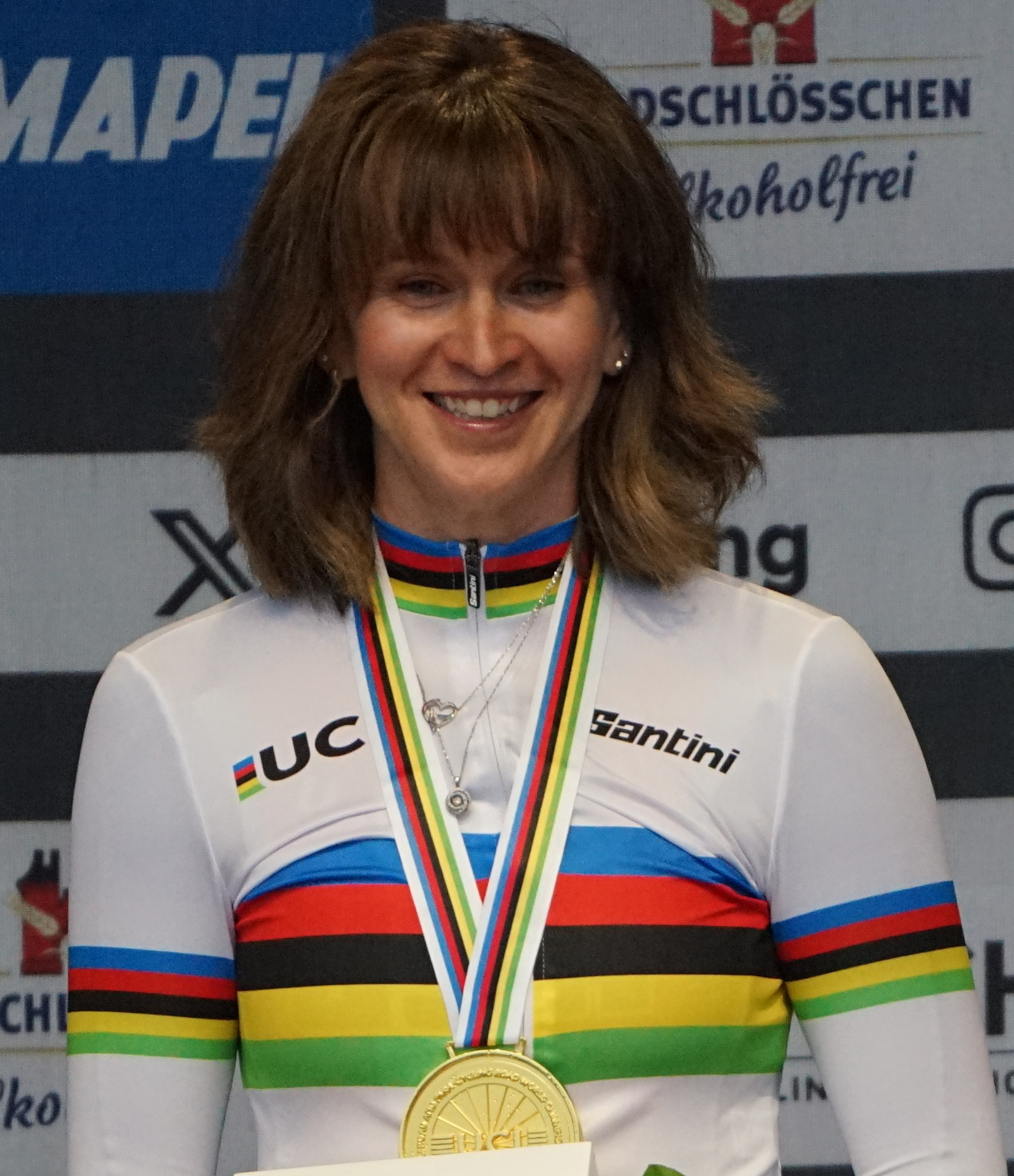
- Bosco winning gold at the 2024 World Championships

Personal information
- Born: February 18, 1987 (age 39) Anchorage, Alaska, US
- Education: 2017, Communications, DeVry University
- Height: 5'9

Sport
- Country: United States
- Sport: Cycling
- Disability class: C4
Medal record
Cycling
Representing United States
Paralympic Games
Gold medal – first place	2024 Paris	Road time trial C4
Bronze medal – third place	2016 Rio de Janeiro	Road time trial C5
Bronze medal – third place	2016 Rio de Janeiro	Individual pursuit C5
Road World Championships
Gold medal – first place	2022 Baie-Comeau	Time trial C4
Gold medal – first place	2022 Baie-Comeau	Road race C4
Gold medal – first place	2023 Glasgow	Time trial C4
Gold medal – first place	2023 Glasgow	Road race C4
Gold medal – first place	2024 Zurich	Road race C4
Silver medal – second place	2024 Zurich	Time trial C4
Silver medal – second place	2025 Ronse	Road race C4
Track World Championships
Silver medal – second place	2022 Saint-Quentin-en-Yvelines	Individual pursuit C4
Silver medal – second place	2023 Glasgow	Omnium C4
Silver medal – second place	2024 Rio de Janeiro	Individual pursuit C4
Bronze medal – third place	2023 Glasgow	Individual pursuit C4
Bronze medal – third place	2023 Glasgow	Scratch race C4

Samantha Bosco (nee Heinrich; February 18, 1987) is an American Paralympic athlete. She competed in Cycling at the 2016 Summer Paralympics, winning two bronze medals.

== Early life and education ==
Bosco was born on February 18, 1987, in Anchorage, Alaska with a bowed tibia in her right leg. She began cycling with her father at the age of seven but surgery to lengthen her leg at the age of 11 left her with crutches, atrophied muscles, and a surgically stunted left leg. As she was unable to cycle, Bosco began rowing and earned a full athletic scholarship to the University of Central Florida. However, the chronic injury forced her to retire from the sport after her sophomore year. Bosco eventually graduated with a Bachelor's degree in Communications from DeVry University and a Master's degree in Accounting from Keller Graduate School of Management of DeVry University.

== Career ==
Upon retiring from rowing, Bosco was encouraged to get back into cycling, this time focusing on the road versus mountain biking. She got back into racing and discovered para-cycling from a friend. Her first race was in Greenville, South Carolina, where she received a C5 classification, and she chose to pursue the sport after earning a gold medal in the women's C5 road race and a silver medal in the time trial. After earning several World Cup and World Championship medals, along with a gold and silver medal at the 2015 ParaPan American Games, Bosco qualified for the 2016 Summer Paralympics.

In the 2016 Summer Paralympics, Bosco earned two bronze medals; one in the C5 individual pursuit and another in the C5 road time trial. In 2017, she won her first World Championship for the 3K Individual Pursuit on her home velodrome in Carson, California. She also competed at the 2019 ParaPan American Games where she won two gold medals in the women's 500-meter time trial C1-5 and women's 3,000m pursuit C4-5, and two bronze in women's time trial C1-5 and women's C4-5 road race.

While training to qualify for the 2020 Summer Paralympics, Bosco worked on her master's degree in accounting and co-ran Bosco Bike Fits with her husband. Once the Paralympics were delayed due to the COVID-19 pandemic, she accepted a marketing position for Angel City Sports, an organization started for athletes with disabilities. She also continued to volunteer as a mentor for Classroom Champions, a nonprofit organization cofounded by retired Olympic bobsledder Steve Mesler.

Once racing started back up in 2021 and re-classified to a C4 after discovering nerve damage in 2019, Bosco went on to compete at the U.S. Paralympics Cycling Open in April 2021 in Huntsville, Alabama and then at the UCI Para-cycling Road World Cup in Ostend, Belgium, where she won both the women's C4 time trial and the 70-km road race. That year, Bosco was nominated for the Best Female Athlete with a Disability ESPY Award and named to the Team USA roster for the 2020 Paralympic Games in Tokyo. Days later, Bosco suffered an injury that kept her from being able to compete at the Games.

Shifting her focus towards making the 2024 Paralympic Games and utilizing the time at home, Bosco came back to the 2022 season strong and has gone on to win both the time trial and road race at the 2022 U.S. Paralympics Cycling Open, UCI Para-Cycling Road World Cup in Belgium, UCI Para-Cycling Road World Cup in Germany, and the USA Cycling Para-cycling Road National Championships.
