= Argentina at the 2023 Parapan American Games =

- Flag of Argentina
- IPC code: ARG
- NPC: Argentine Paralympic Committee
- Website: www.paralympic.org/argentina

in Santiago, Chile 17 November 2023 – 26 November 2023
- Competitors: 206 (137 men and 69 women) in 17 sports
- Flag bearers: Ángel Deldo; Antonella Ruiz Díaz
- Officials: 82
- Medals Ranked 5th: Gold 25 Silver 36 Bronze 52 Total 113

Parapan American Games appearances
- 1999; 2003; 2007; 2011; 2015; 2019; 2023

Argentina is scheduled to compete in the 2023 Parapan American Games in Santiago, Chile from 17 November to 26 November 2023.

Football 5-a-side player Ángel Deldo and parathlete Antonella Ruiz Díaz were the country's flagbearers during the opening ceremony.

== Medalists ==
The following Argentine competitors won medals at the games. In the discipline sections below, the medalists' names are bolded.

Medal	Name	Sport	Event	Date
Gold	Matias de Andrade	Swimming	Men's 100 metre backstroke S6	November 18
Gold	Diego Rivero	Swimming	Men's 100 metre breaststroke SB4	November 18
Gold	Daniela Gimenez	Swimming	Women's 100 metre breaststroke SB9	November 18
Gold	Analuz Pellitero	Swimming	Women's 50 metre freestyle S11	November 18
Gold	Elías Romero	Table tennis	Men's individual C5	November 18
Gold	Maximiliano Gómez; Guide: Sebastián Tolosa	Cycling	Men's road time trial B	November 19
Gold	Fernando Carlomagno	Swimming	Men's 100 metre backstroke S8	November 19
Gold	Santiago Senestro	Swimming	Men's 200 metre individual medley SM10	November 19
Gold	Iñaki Basiloff	Swimming	Men's 400 metre freestyle S7	November 19
Gold	Maximiliano Villa	Athletics	Men's 200 metres T35	November 21
Gold	Alexis Chavez	Athletics	Men's 400 metres T36	November 22
Gold	Araceli Rotela	Athletics	Women's 200 metres T36	November 22
Gold	Analuz Pellitero	Swimming	Women's 100 metre freestyle S11	November 22
Gold	Hernán Barreto	Athletics	Men's 100 metres T35	November 23
Gold	Antonella Ruiz Díaz	Athletics	Women's shot put F40/F41	November 23
Gold	Analuz Pellitero	Swimming	Women's 100 metre backstroke S11	November 23
Gold	Alexis Chavez	Athletics	Men's 100 metres T36	November 24
Gold	Brian Impellizzeri	Athletics	Men's long jump T37/T38	November 24
Gold	Araceli Rotela	Athletics	Women's 100 metres T36	November 24
Gold	Juan Samorano	Taekwondo	Men's 70 kg	November 24
Gold	Gustavo Fernandez; Ezequiel Casco	Wheelchair tennis	Men's doubles	November 24
Gold	Fernando Vázquez	Athletics	Men's 100 metres T12	November 25
Gold	Rodrigo Romero; Stefanía Ferrando	Boccia	Mixed pairs BC3	November 25
Gold	Gustavo Fernandez	Wheelchair tennis	Men's singles	November 25
Gold	Maximiliano Gómez; Guide: Sebastián Tolosa	Cycling	Men's road race B	November 26
Silver	Iñaki Basiloff	Swimming	Men's 200 metre individual medley SM7	November 18
Silver	Nadia Baez	Swimming	Women's 50 metre freestyle S11	November 18
Silver	José Bustamante	Table tennis	Men's individual C1	November 18
Silver	Nayla Kuell	Table tennis	Women's individual C4–5	November 18
Silver	Giselle Muñoz	Table tennis	Women's individual C6–7	November 18
Silver	María José Quiroga; Guide: Micaela Barroso	Cycling	Women's road time trial B	November 19
Silver	Eduardo Gauto	Judo	Men's 73 kg	November 19
Silver	Rocío Ledesma	Judo	Women's 48 kg	November 19
Silver	Nadia Boggiano	Judo	Women's 70 kg	November 20
Silver	Lucas Leguiza	Swimming	Men's 100 metre butterfly S8	November 20
Silver	Elian Araya	Swimming	Men's 100 metre breaststroke SB14	November 20
Silver	Daniela Gimenez	Swimming	Women's 100 metre butterfly S9	November 20
Silver	Hernán Barreto	Athletics	Men's 200 metres T35	November 21
Silver	Analuz Pellitero	Swimming	Women's 200 metre individual medley SM11	November 21
Silver	Rodrigo Romero	Boccia	Men's individual BC3	November 22
Silver	Stefanía Ferrando	Boccia	Women's individual BC3	November 22
Silver	German Arevalo	Swimming	Men's 100 metre breaststroke SB5	November 22
Silver	Nicolas Nieto	Swimming	Men's 100 metre butterfly S10	November 22
Silver	Maximiliano Villa	Athletics	Men's 100 metres T35	November 23
Silver	Alberto Piriz	Athletics	Men's long jump T47	November 23
Silver	Hernan Emanuel Urra	Athletics	Men's shot put F35/F36/F37	November 23
Silver	Blanca Cerrudo	Athletics	Women's 100 metres T13	November 23
Silver	Maximiliano Gómez; Guide: Sebastián Tolosa	Cycling	Men's individual pursuit B	November 23
Silver	María José Quiroga; Guide: Micaela Barroso	Cycling	Women's individual pursuit B	November 23
Silver	Iñaki Basiloff	Swimming	Men's 50 metre freestyle S7	November 23
Silver	Yanina Martinez	Athletics	Women's 100 metres T36	November 24
Silver	María José Quiroga; Guide: Micaela Barroso	Cycling	Women's individual time trial B	November 24
Silver	Santiago Senestro	Swimming	Men's 100 metre backstroke S10	November 24
Silver	Lautaro Maidana	Swimming	Men's 100 metre butterfly S14	November 24
Silver	Analuz Pellitero	Swimming	Women's 400 metre freestyle S11	November 24
Silver	Milagros Mostaffa	Athletics	Women's 100 metres T35	November 25
Silver	Lucia Montenegro	Athletics	Women's 100 metres T54	November 25
Silver	Antonella Ruiz Díaz	Athletics	Women's discus throw F41	November 25
Silver	Argentina national cerebral palsy football team: Fabricio Álvarez; Matías Bassi; Cristian Billordo; Carlos Carrizo; Duncan Coronel; Matías Fernández; Nahuel Gutiérrez; Rodrigo Lugrin; Mariano Morana; Federico Ocantos; Germán Romussi; Matías Salvat; Bautista Suárez; Matías Vera	Football 7-a-side	Men's tournament	November 25
Silver	María Agustina Cruceño; Guide: Mayra Tocha	Cycling	Women's road race B	November 26
Silver	Mariela Delgado	Cycling	Women's road race C4–5	November 26
Bronze	Santiago Senestro	Swimming	Men's 100 metre breaststroke SB9	November 18
Bronze	Daniela Gimenez	Swimming	Women's 50 metre freestyle S10	November 18
Bronze	Gabriel Copola	Table tennis	Men's individual C3	November 18
Bronze	Mauro Depergola	Table tennis	Men's individual C5	November 18
Bronze	Aleksy Kaniuka	Table tennis	Men's individual C7	November 18
Bronze	Alejandro Pérez	Table tennis	Men's individual C8	November 18
Bronze	Eithan Skliarsky	Table tennis	Men's individual C9	November 18
Bronze	María Agustina Cruceño; Guide: Mayra Tocha	Cycling	Women's road time trial B	November 19
Bronze	Laura González	Judo	Women's 57 kg	November 19
Bronze	Paula Gómez	Judo	Women's 57 kg	November 19
Bronze	Iñaki Basiloff	Swimming	Men's 100 metre backstroke S8	November 19
Bronze	Facundo Arregui	Swimming	Men's 400 metre freestyle S7	November 19
Bronze	Gabriel Copola; Nayla Kuell	Table tennis	Mixed doubles C10	November 19
Bronze	Cristian Alderete	Judo	Men's +90 kg	November 20
Bronze	María Rodríguez	Shooting	R5 Mixed 10 metre air rifle prone SH2	November 20
Bronze	Maria Garrone; Elías Romero	Table tennis	Mixed doubles C4–7	November 20
Bronze	Darío Neira; Giselle Muñoz	Table tennis	Mixed doubles C14–17	November 20
Bronze	Maria Garrone; Nayla Kuell	Table tennis	Women's doubles C5–10	November 20
Bronze	Andres Pinillos	Athletics	Men's shot put F40/F41	November 21
Bronze	Milagros Gonzalez	Athletics	Women's 400 metres T38	November 21
Bronze	Aldana Ibañez	Athletics	Women's long jump T47	November 21
Bronze	Karen Tassi	Athletics	Women's shot put F35/F36/F37	November 21
Bronze	Florencia Romero	Athletics	Women's discus throw F11	November 21
Bronze	María Rodríguez	Shooting	R4 Mixed 10 metre air rifle standing SH2	November 21
Bronze	Walter Piazza; Nadia Baez; Analuz Pellitero; Jones Simone	Swimming	Mixed 4 × 100 metre medley relay 49 points	November 21
Bronze	Nadia Baez	Swimming	Women's 100 metre breaststroke SB12	November 21
Bronze	Nadia Baez	Swimming	Women's 200 metre individual medley SM11	November 21
Bronze	Fabricio Lopez	Athletics	Men's 400 metres T36	November 22
Bronze	Antonio Rodas	Athletics	Men's shot put F12	November 22
Bronze	Juan Aznarez	Athletics	Men's shot put F46	November 22
Bronze	Milagros Mostaffa	Athletics	Women's 200 metres T35	November 22
Bronze	Yanina Martinez	Athletics	Women's 200 metres T36	November 22
Bronze	Luis Cristaldo	Boccia	Men's individual BC2	November 22
Bronze	Ailén Flores	Boccia	Women's individual BC1	November 22
Bronze	Iñaki Basiloff	Swimming	Men's 50 metre butterfly S7	November 22
Bronze	Lautaro Maidana	Swimming	Men's 200 metre individual medley SM14	November 22
Bronze	Sergio Markieviche	Athletics	Men's long jump T36	November 23
Bronze	Raúl Cesar Villalba; Guide: Ezequiel Romero	Cycling	Men's individual pursuit B	November 23
Bronze	Iñaki Basiloff	Swimming	Men's 100 metre breaststroke SB6	November 23
Bronze	Lucas Leguiza	Swimming	Men's 200 metre individual medley SM8	November 23
Bronze	Ana Noriega	Swimming	Women's 200 metre freestyle S5	November 23
Bronze	Fabricio Lopez	Athletics	Men's 100 metres T36	November 24
Bronze	Sebastian Poltrone	Athletics	Men's shot put F32/F33/F34	November 24
Bronze	Matias Puebla	Athletics	Men's javelin throw F46	November 24
Bronze	Maximiliano Gómez; Guide: Sebastián Tolosa	Cycling	Men's individual time trial B	November 24
Bronze	Nicolas Nieto	Swimming	Men's 100 metre backstroke S10	November 24
Bronze	Sergioff Zayas	Swimming	Men's 400 metre freestyle S11	November 24
Bronze	Ana Noriega	Swimming	Women's 100 metre freestyle S5	November 24
Bronze	Franco Pinetti	Athletics	Men's long jump T13	November 25
Bronze	Ailén Flores; Luis Cristaldo; Jonatan Aquino	Boccia	Mixed team BC1–2	November 25
Bronze	Argentina national blind football team: Guido Consoni; Ángel Deldo; Nahuel Heredia; Froilán Padilla; Daniel Iturria; Jesús Merlos; Maximiliano Espenillo; Ezequiel Fernándes; Mario Fabián Ríos; Germán Muleck	Football 5-a-side	Men's tournament	November 25
Bronze	María José Quiroga; Guide: Micaela Barroso	Cycling	Women's road race B	November 26

Medals by sport
Sport	1st place, gold medalist(s)	2nd place, silver medalist(s)	3rd place, bronze medalist(s)	Total
Swimming	9	12	15	**36**
Athletics	9	9	15	**33**
Cycling	2	6	4	**12**
Wheelchair tennis	2	0	0	**2**
Table tennis	1	3	9	**13**
Boccia	1	2	3	**6**
Taekwondo	1	0	0	**1**
Judo	0	3	3	**6**
Football 7-a-side	0	1	0	**1**
Shooting	0	0	2	**2**
Football 5-a-side	0	0	1	**1**
Total	25	36	52	113

Medals by day
Day	Date	1st place, gold medalist(s)	2nd place, silver medalist(s)	3rd place, bronze medalist(s)	Total
1	November 18	5	5	7	**17**
2	November 19	4	3	6	**13**
3	November 20	0	4	5	**9**
4	November 21	1	2	8	**11**
5	November 22	3	4	10	**17**
6	November 23	3	7	5	**15**
7	November 24	5	5	7	**17**
8	November 25	3	4	3	**10**
9	November 26	1	2	1	**4**
Total		25	36	52	113

Medals by gender
**Gender**	1st place, gold medalist(s)	2nd place, silver medalist(s)	3rd place, bronze medalist(s)	**Total**
Male	17	17	28	62
Female	7	19	17	43
Mixed	1	0	7	8
Total	25	36	52	113

== Competitors ==
The following is the list of number of competitors (per gender) participating at the games per sport/discipline.

Sport	Men	Women	Total
Archery	2	2	4
Athletics	22	16	38
Badminton	4	2	6
Boccia	4	4	8
Cycling	4	6	10
Football 5-a-side	10	—N/a	10
Football 7-a-side	14	—N/a	14
Goalball	6	6	12
Judo	4	4	8
Powerlifting	3	1	4
Shooting	1	2	3
Swimming	21	11	32
Table tennis	13	4	17
Taekwondo	4	0	4
Wheelchair basketball	12	12	24
Wheelchair rugby	12	0	12
Wheelchair tennis	3	1	4
Total	137	69	206

== Archery ==
Men

Athlete	Event	Ranking Round		Round of 16	Quarterfinals	Semifinals	Final / BM	
Athlete	Event	Score	Seed	Opposition Score	Opposition Score	Opposition Score	Opposition Score	Rank
Federico Paolorossi	Individual compound open	635	8	Parada (VEN); L 129–138	Did not advance			
Simón Chismak	Individual recurve open	532	6	Green (JAM); W 6–0	Ramirez (COL); L 2–6	Did not advance		

Women

Athlete	Event	Ranking Round		Quarterfinals	Semifinals	Final / BM	
Athlete	Event	Score	Seed	Opposition Score	Opposition Score	Opposition Score	Rank
Albina Torres	Individual W1	250	3	—N/a	López (CHI); L 49–79	Did not advance	3
Mirta Rodríguez	Individual recurve open	380	8	Daza (COL); L 0–6	Did not advance		

Mixed team

Athlete	Event	Ranking Round		Quarterfinals	Semifinals	Final / BM	
Athlete	Event	Score	Seed	Opposition Score	Opposition Score	Opposition Score	Rank
Simón Chismak; Mirta Rodríguez	Team recurve open	912	6	United States; L 0–6	Did not advance		

== Athletics ==
Key

- Note–Ranks given for track events are within the athlete's heat only
- Q = Qualified for the next round
- q = Qualified for the next round as a fastest loser
- N/A = Round not applicable for the event
- Bye = Athlete not required to compete in round

Men

Track events

Athlete	Event	Semifinal		Final	
Athlete	Event	Result	Rank	Result	Rank
Fernando Vázquez	100 m T12	—N/a		11.18	1st place, gold medalist(s)
Hernán Barreto	100 m T35	12.24	1 Q	12.10	1st place, gold medalist(s)
Diego González	100 m T35	12.99	5 Q	12.84	5
Maximiliano Villa	100 m T35	12.29	2 Q	12.19	2nd place, silver medalist(s)
Alexis Chavez	100 m T36	—N/a		11.83	1st place, gold medalist(s)
Fabricio Lopez	100 m T36	—N/a		12.24	3rd place, bronze medalist(s)
Alberto Piriz	100 m T47	11.57	9	Did not advance	
Matias Puebla	100 m T47	12.27	10	Did not advance	
Hernán Barreto	200 m T35	25.89	2 Q	25.44	2nd place, silver medalist(s)
Diego González	200 m T35	32.88	9	Did not advance	
Maximiliano Villa	200 m T35	24.66	1 Q	24.79	1st place, gold medalist(s)
Franco Pinetti	400 m T13	—N/a		55.37	6
Alexis Chavez	400 m T36	—N/a		54.63	1st place, gold medalist(s)
Fabricio Lopez	400 m T36	—N/a		58.05	3rd place, bronze medalist(s)
Sergio Markieviche	400 m T36	—N/a		59.92	5

Field events

Athlete	Event	Final	
Athlete	Event	Distance	Position
Franco Pinetti	Long jump T13	6.47	3rd place, bronze medalist(s)
Sergio Markieviche	Long jump T36	5.29	3rd place, bronze medalist(s)
Brian Impellizzeri	Long jump T37/T38	6.65	1st place, gold medalist(s)
Alberto Piriz	Long jump T47	6.91	2nd place, silver medalist(s)
Antonio Ortiz	Shot put F11	8.93	8
Jonathan Marin	Shot put F12	11.36	5
Ignacio Parodi	Shot put F12	12.94	4
Antonio Rodas	Shot put F12	13.23	3rd place, bronze medalist(s)
Sebastian Poltrone	Shot put F32/F33/F34	9.17	3rd place, bronze medalist(s)
Hernan Emanuel Urra	Shot put F35/F36/F37	15.77	2nd place, silver medalist(s)
Andres Pinillos	Shot put F40/F41	7.44	3rd place, bronze medalist(s)
Juan Aznarez	Shot put F46	12.38	3rd place, bronze medalist(s)
Pablo Gimenez	Shot put F57	12.52	4
Antonio Ortiz	Discus throw F11	27.38	6
Andres Pinillos	Javelin throw F41	NM	
Juan Aznarez	Javelin throw F46	46.24	5
Daniel Gauna	Javelin throw F46	46.36	4
Matias Puebla	Javelin throw F46	48.97	3rd place, bronze medalist(s)
Pablo Gimenez	Javelin throw F57	35.64	7

Women

Track events

Athlete	Event	Semifinal		Final	
Athlete	Event	Result	Rank	Result	Rank
Rosario Coppola	100 m T11	DNS		Did not advance	
Blanca Cerrudo	100 m T13	—N/a		13.11	2nd place, silver medalist(s)
Milagros Mostaffa	100 m T35	—N/a		16.40	2nd place, silver medalist(s)
Gloria Carabajal	100 m T36	—N/a		15.71	5
Yanina Martinez	100 m T36	—N/a		14.51	2nd place, silver medalist(s)
Araceli Rotela	100 m T36	—N/a		14.49	1st place, gold medalist(s)
Milagros Gonzalez	100 m T38	14.72	5 Q	14.58	5
Teresita Briozzi	100 m T47	13.07	7 Q	13.02	7
Lourdes Campero	100 m T47	12.95	5 Q	12.81	5
Aldana Ibañez	100 m T47	13.38	8 Q	13.38	8
Milagros Ferreyra	100 m T53	—N/a		18.66	4
Lucia Montenegro	100 m T54	—N/a		17.06	2nd place, silver medalist(s)
Milagros Mostaffa	200 m T35	—N/a		36.09	3rd place, bronze medalist(s)
Gloria Carabajal	200 m T36	—N/a		33.77	5
Yanina Martinez	200 m T36	—N/a		31.94	3rd place, bronze medalist(s)
Araceli Rotela	200 m T36	—N/a		30.28	1st place, gold medalist(s)
Teresita Briozzi	200 m T47	26.41	5 Q	26.45	5
Lourdes Campero	200 m T47	26.61	6 Q	26.93	6
Milagros Gonzalez	400 m T38	1:09.07	3 Q	1:07.48	3rd place, bronze medalist(s)
Teresita Briozzi	400 m T47	1:02.14	6 Q	1:01.73	4
Lourdes Campero	400 m T47	1:14.68	10	Did not advance	
Milagros Ferreyra	400 m T53/T54	—N/a		1:12.20	7
Lucia Montenegro	400 m T53/T54	—N/a		59.84	4
Milagros Ferreyra	800 m T53/T54	—N/a		2:29.51	7
Lucia Montenegro	800 m T53/T54	—N/a		1:58.29	4

Field events

Athlete	Event	Final	
Athlete	Event	Distance	Position
Rosario Coppola	Long jump T11/T12	3.28	5
Aldana Ibañez	Long jump T47	5.08	3rd place, bronze medalist(s)
Florencia Romero	Shot put F12	9.33	4
Leticia Correa	Shot put F32/F33/F34	3.89	4
Karen Tassi	Shot put F35/F36/F37	9.48	3rd place, bronze medalist(s)
Antonella Ruiz Díaz	Shot put F40/F41	9.89	1st place, gold medalist(s)
Florencia Romero	Discus throw F11	26.32	3rd place, bronze medalist(s)
Karen Tassi	Discus throw F38	24.13	6
Antonella Ruiz Díaz	Discus throw F41	27.88	2nd place, silver medalist(s)

== Badminton ==
Men

Athlete	Event	Preliminaries				Semifinals	Final / BM	
Athlete	Event	Opposition Result	Opposition Result	Opposition Result	Rank	Opposition Result	Opposition Result	Rank
Lucas Diaz	Singles WH1	Vilcachagua (PER); L 6–21, 9–21	Conceição (BRA); L 7–21, 4–21	—N/a	3	Did not advance		
Amilcar Robledo	Singles WH2	Lapointe (CAN); L 5–21, 12–21	Vázquez (MEX); L 7–21, 10–21	Godoy (BRA); L 3–21, 4–21	4	Did not advance		
Jonathan Torres	Singles SL4	Lapointe (CAN); L 5–21, 8–21	Cleto (BRA); L 3–21, 2–21	—N/a	3	Did not advance		
Jonatan Mattos	Singles SH6	Lightfoot (CAN); L 5–21, 14–21	Coloma (CHI); W 21–8, 21–5	Krajewski (USA); L 8–21, 2–21	3	Did not advance		
Amilcar Robledo; Lucas Diaz	Doubles WH1–WH2	Godoy / Conceição (BRA); L 5–21, 5–21	Fajardo / Vilcachagua (PER); L 13–21, 15–21	—N/a	3	Did not advance		

Women

Athlete	Event	Preliminaries				Semifinals	Final / BM	
Athlete	Event	Opposition Result	Opposition Result	Opposition Result	Rank	Opposition Result	Opposition Result	Rank
Ruth Vicente	Singles WH2	Zapata (CHI); W 21–16, 21–8	Jáuregui (PER); L 4–21, 6–21	—N/a	2 Q	Jáuregui (PER); L 5–21, 4–21	Bronze medal match Silva (PER); L 6–21, 4–21	4
Karina Loyola	Singles SH6	Fernández (PER); L 10–21, 8–21	Simon (USA); L 10–21, 8–21	Reis (BRA); W 21–4, 21–3	3	Did not advance		

Mixed

Athlete	Event	Preliminaries				
Athlete	Event	Opposition Result	Opposition Result	Opposition Result	Opposition Result	Rank
Jonatan Mattos; Karina Loyola	Doubles SH6	Krajewski / Simon (USA); L 4–21, 4–21	Salva / Fernández (PER); L 16–21, 8–21	Kendrick / Cloëtta (CAN); L 21–23, 19–21	Quispe / Póveda (PER); L 11–21, 2–21	5

== Boccia ==
Men

Athlete	Event	Pool matches				Playoffs	Semifinals	Final / BM	
Athlete	Event	Opposition Score	Opposition Score	Opposition Score	Rank	Opposition Score	Opposition Score	Opposition Score	Rank
Luis Cristaldo	Individual BC2	Delgado (ECU); W 7–1	Allard (CAN); L 2–7	—N/a	2 Q	Paredes (MEX); W 5–2	Santos (BRA); L 1–4	Bronze medal match Sayes (ESA); W 5–2	3rd place, bronze medalist(s)
Jonatan Aquino	Individual BC2	Sayes (ESA); L 0–8	Santos (BRA); L 2–3	—N/a	3	Did not advance			
Rodrigo Romero	Individual BC3	Lopez (MEX); W 5–4	Carvalho (BRA); L 4–5	Rondeau (CAN); W 6–4	2 Q	—N/a	Acosta (PER); W 3–2	Carvalho (BRA); L 4–5	2nd place, silver medalist(s)
Facundo Bullicio	Individual BC4	Grisales (COL); L 0–11	Dispaltro (CAN); L 1–9	Costa (BRA); L 0–10	4	Did not advance			

Women

Athlete	Event	Pool matches				Playoffs	Semifinals	Final / BM	
Athlete	Event	Opposition Score	Opposition Score	Opposition Score	Rank	Opposition Score	Opposition Score	Opposition Score	Rank
Ailén Flores	Individual BC1	Desilva-Andrade (BER); L 2–3	Oliveira (BRA); L 0–5	Quiroz (ECU); W 7–0	3	—N/a			3rd place, bronze medalist(s)
Stefanía Ferrando	Individual BC3	Barboza (URU); W 16–0	Callupe (PER); W 5–4	—N/a	1 Q	Pancca (PER); W 10–0	Quintriqueo (CHI); W 8–1	Oliveira (BRA); L 4–5	2nd place, silver medalist(s)
Isis Marian Calderón	Individual BC4	Quispe (PER); L 1–6	Silva (BRA); L 0–10	—N/a	3	Did not advance			

Mixed

Athlete	Event	Pool matches			Semifinals	Final / BM	
Athlete	Event	Opposition Score	Opposition Score	Rank	Opposition Score	Opposition Score	Rank
Ailén Flores; Luis Cristaldo; Jonatan Aquino	Team BC1–BC2	Chile; W 8–6	Mexico; W 6–5	1 Q	Brazil; L 8–9	Bronze medal match Chile; W 10–2	3rd place, bronze medalist(s)
Rodrigo Romero; Stefanía Ferrando	Pairs BC3	Chile; W DNS	Peru; L 0–9	2 Q	Colombia; W 6–2	Peru; W 6–5	1st place, gold medalist(s)
Facundo Bullicio; Isis Marian Calderón	Pairs BC4	Canada; L 0–9	Brazil; W 3–2	3	Did not advance		

== Cycling ==
=== Road ===
Men

Athlete	Event	Result	Rank
Maximiliano Gómez	Time trial B	28:27.53	1st place, gold medalist(s)
Raúl Cesar Villalba	Time trial B	31:06.59	4
Rodrigo López	Time trial C1–5	31:49.40	20
Andrés Biga	Time trial H1–5	32:33.02	4
Maximiliano Gómez	Road race B	2:03:31	1st place, gold medalist(s)
Raúl Cesar Villalba	Road race B	OTL	5
Rodrigo López	Road race C1–3	LAP	
Andrés Biga	Road race H3–5	1:51:19	7

Women

Athlete	Event	Result	Rank
María Agustina Cruceño	Time trial B	34:55.88	3rd place, bronze medalist(s)
María José Quiroga	Time trial B	34:16.25	2nd place, silver medalist(s)
Mariela Delgado	Time trial C1–5	17:36.24	10
María Magdalena Sergo	Time trial C1–5	18:10.08	13
Patricia Winter	Time trial H1–5	29:20.19	6
María Agustina Cruceño	Road race B	2:10:49	2nd place, silver medalist(s)
María José Quiroga	Road race B	2:13:06	3rd place, bronze medalist(s)
María Magdalena Sergo	Road race C1–3	1:23:28	8
Mariela Delgado	Road race C4–5	1:47:16	2nd place, silver medalist(s)
Patricia Winter	Road race H2–5	OTL	6

Mixed

Athlete	Event	Result	Rank
Giovanna Sofía Loiudice	Time trial T1–2	30:44.21	8
Giovanna Sofía Loiudice	Road race T1–2	OTL	8

=== Track ===
Men

Athlete	Event	Heats		Final	
Athlete	Event	Result	Rank	Result	Rank
Maximiliano Gómez	Individual pursuit B	4:27.529	2 FA	Serna (COL); L 4:28.968	2nd place, silver medalist(s)
Raúl Cesar Villalba	Individual pursuit B	4:44.269	3 FB	Bronze medal final Stephens (USA); W OVL	3rd place, bronze medalist(s)
Rodrigo López	Individual pursuit C1–3	4:10.570	7	Did not advance	
Maximiliano Gómez	Time trial B	—N/a		1:05.673	3rd place, bronze medalist(s)
Raúl Cesar Villalba	Time trial B	—N/a		1:14.056	5
Rodrigo López	Time trial C1–5	—N/a		1:11.898	9

Women

Athlete	Event	Heats		Final	
Athlete	Event	Result	Rank	Result	Rank
María Agustina Cruceño	Individual pursuit B	4:02.731	4 FB	Bronze medal final Garcia (BRA); L 4:06.580	4
María José Quiroga	Individual pursuit B	3:50.767	1 FA	Chadwick-Dias (USA); L 3:47.818	2nd place, silver medalist(s)
María Magdalena Sergo	Individual pursuit C1–3	5:04.543	8	Did not advance	
Mariela Delgado	Individual pursuit C4–5	4:03.148	4 FB	Bronze medal final Ossa Veloza (COL); L OVL	4
María Agustina Cruceño	Time trial B	—N/a		1:17.897	4
María José Quiroga	Time trial B	—N/a		1:13.431	2nd place, silver medalist(s)
Mariela Delgado	Time trial C1–5	—N/a		39.569	6
María Magdalena Sergo	Time trial C1–5	—N/a		44.756	12

== Football 5-a-side ==
Summary

Team	Event	Group stage						Final / BM	
Team	Event	Opposition Score	Opposition Score	Opposition Score	Opposition Score	Opposition Score	Rank	Opposition Score	Rank
Argentina men's	Men's tournament	Chile; W 2–0	Peru; W 1–0	Mexico; W 4–0	Brazil; W 1–0	Colombia; L 0–1	3 FB	Bronze medal match Chile; W 2–0	3rd place, bronze medalist(s)

Roster men's team

- Guido Consoni
- Ángel Deldo
- Nahuel Heredia
- Froilán Padilla
- Daniel Iturria
- Jesús Merlos
- Maximiliano Espenillo
- Ezequiel Fernándes
- Mario Fabián Durval Ríos
- Germán Muleck

Preliminary round

Pos	Team	Pld	W	D	L	GF	GA	GD	Pts	Qualification
1	Brazil	5	4	0	1	9	1	+8	12	Gold medal match
2	Colombia	5	4	0	1	9	1	+8	12	Gold medal match
3	Argentina	5	4	0	1	8	1	+7	12	Bronze medal match
4	Chile	5	1	1	3	2	7	−5	4	Bronze medal match
5	Mexico	5	0	2	3	1	9	−8	2	5th–6th place match
6	Peru	5	0	1	4	1	11	−10	1	5th–6th place match

Source: PASO
November 18
16:00

Chile	0–2	Argentina
	Report	Espinillo 24', 27'

Paralympic Training Center, Santiago
Referee: Lucio Pinheiro (Brazil)

November 19
20:00

Argentina	1–0	Peru
Fernandes 9'	Report

Paralympic Training Center, Santiago
Referee: Ellen Grosskopf (Brazil)

November 20
20:00

Argentina	4–0	Mexico
Espinillo 5'; Durval 12', 25', 26'	Report

Paralympic Training Center, Santiago
Referee: Luis Oliveros (Colombia)

November 22
18:00

Brazil	0–1	Argentina
	Report	Espinillo 2'

Paralympic Training Center, Santiago
Referee: Alfredo Martínez (Mexico)

November 23
16:00

Colombia	1–0	Argentina
Gonzalez 2'	Report

Paralympic Training Center, Santiago
Referee: Lucio Pinheiro (Brazil)

Bronze medal match

November 25
18:00

Argentina	2–0	Chile
Espinillo 10', 16'	Report

Paralympic Training Center, Santiago
Referee: Lucio Pinheiro (Brazil)

== Football 7-a-side ==
Summary

Team	Event	Group stage						Final / BM	
Team	Event	Opposition Score	Opposition Score	Opposition Score	Opposition Score	Opposition Score	Rank	Opposition Score	Rank
Argentina men's	Men's tournament	Brazil; L 1–2	United States; W 2–1	Venezuela; W 4–0	Canada; W 10–0	Chile; W 5–0	2 FG	Brazil; L 0–1 (a.e.t.)	2nd place, silver medalist(s)

Roster men's team

- Fabricio Álvarez
- Matías Bassi
- Cristian Billordo
- Carlos Carrizo
- Duncan Coronel
- Matías Fernández
- Nahuel Gutiérrez
- Rodrigo Lugrin
- Mariano Morana
- Federico Ocantos
- Germán Romussi
- Matías Salvat
- Bautista Suárez Carboneti
- Matías Vera

Preliminary round

18 November
17:00

Brazil	2 – 1	Argentina
Cardoso de Souza 4'; Magalhães 18'		Fernandez 9'

Estadio Bicentenario de La Florida, Santiago

19 November
14:30

Argentina	2 – 1	United States
Billordo 32'; Carrizo 40'		Crumbley 61'

Estadio Bicentenario de La Florida, Santiago

20 November
14:30

Argentina	4 – 0	Venezuela
Romussi 8'; Carrizo 23'; Bassi 30+2'; Fernandez 43'

Estadio Bicentenario de La Florida, Santiago

22 November
19:30

Canada	0 – 10	Argentina
		Suarez 9'; Coronel 11'; Lugrin 27', 38'; Carrizo 29'; Billordo 48', 54'; Bassi 55', 59'; Ocantos 58'

Estadio Bicentenario de La Florida, Santiago

23 November
19:30

Chile	0 – 6	Argentina
		Morana 6', 13'; Fernandez 33'; Bassi 51', 54'

Estadio Bicentenario de La Florida, Santiago

Gold medal match

25 November
19:30

Brazil	1 – 0 (a.e.t)	Argentina
Batista de Aguiar 72'

Estadio Bicentenario de La Florida, Santiago

== Goalball ==
Summary

Team	Event	Group stage				Quarterfinal	Semifinal	Final / BM	
Team	Event	Opposition Score	Opposition Score	Opposition Score	Rank	Opposition Score	Opposition Score	Opposition Score	Rank
Argentina men's	Men's tournament	United States; L 5–9	Canada; W 5–4	Venezuela; W 11–2	2 Q	Mexico; W 11–8	Brazil; L 2–8	Bronze medal match Canada; L 2–6	4
Argentina women's	Women's tournament	Brazil; L 2–12	Guatemala; W 8–0	Mexico; W 9–7	2 Q	Chile; W 6–1	United States; L 1–8	Bronze medal match Brazil; L 0–10	4

Roster men's team

- Matías Brítez
- Leonardo Jazmín
- Oscar Méndez Silva
- Matías Miranda
- Eloy Nieva
- Mario Velárdez

Roster women's team

- Graciela Almada
- Mariela Almada
- Romina Cardozo
- Guadalupe Romero
- Lourdes Segovia
- Milagros Soria

== Judo ==
Men

Athlete	Event	Round of 16	Quarterfinals	Semifinals	Repechage 1	Repechage 2	Final / BM	
Athlete	Event	Opposition Result	Opposition Result	Opposition Result	Opposition Result	Opposition Result	Opposition Result	Rank
David Gómez	−60 kg	Bye	Lira (BRA); L 00–10	Did not advance	Bye	Herrera (CHI); W 10–00	Bronze medal final Borges (URU); L 00–10	=5
Fabián Ramírez	−73 kg	Villalobos (PER); W 10–00	Romero (CUB); L 00–10	Did not advance	Bye	Ferraro (USA); L 00–10	Did not advance	
Eduardo Gauto	−73 kg	Bye	Ortiz (MEX); W 10–00	García (CUB); W 10–00	Bye		Pereira (BRA); L 00–10	2nd place, silver medalist(s)
Cristian Alderete	+90 kg	Bye	Aguirre (MEX); W 10–01	Silva (BRA); L 00–10	—N/a		Bronze medal final Parra (CHI); W 10–01	3rd place, bronze medalist(s)

Women

Athlete	Event	Group round				Round of 16	Quarterfinals	Semifinals	Repechage	Final / BM	
Athlete	Event	Opposition Result	Opposition Result	Opposition Result	Rank	Opposition Result	Opposition Result	Opposition Result	Opposition Result	Opposition Result	Rank
Rocío Ledesma	−48 kg	Yañez (CHI); W 10–00	Santos (BRA); W 10–00	Silva (BRA); L 00–10	2	—N/a					2nd place, silver medalist(s)
Laura González	−57 kg	—N/a				Bye	Mowatt (CAN); W 10–00	Mutia (USA); L 00–10	Bye	Bronze medal final Lamadrid (COL); W 10–00	3rd place, bronze medalist(s)
Paula Gómez	−57 kg	—N/a				Bye	Martinez (CHI); W 10–00	Teixeira (BRA); L 00–10	Bye	Bronze medal final Oliveira (BRA); W 10–00	3rd place, bronze medalist(s)
Nadia Boggiano	−70 kg	Hecheverría (CUB); W 10–00	Almanza (CHI); W 10–00	Souza (BRA); L 00–10	2	—N/a					2nd place, silver medalist(s)

== Powerlifting ==
Men

Athlete	Event	Total lifted	Rank
Rodrigo Villamarín	–49 kg	124	5
Nahuel Gómez	–97 kg	157	4
Matías Fenoy	–107 kg & +107 kg	100.0	6

Women

Athlete	Event	Total lifted	Rank
Lourdes Maciel	–45 kg	78	4

Mixed

Athlete	Event	Group stage		Head-to-Head		Final / BM	
Athlete	Event	Score	Rank	Opposition Score	Rank	Opposition Score	Rank
Matías Fenoy; Lourdes Maciel; Rodrigo Villamarín	Team	202.1	4	Did not advance			

== Shooting ==
Men

Athlete	Event	Qualification		Final	
Athlete	Event	Score	Rank	Score	Rank
Osvaldo Gentili	P1 – 10 m air pistol SH1	511	13	Did not advance	

Women

Athlete	Event	Qualification		Final	
Athlete	Event	Score	Rank	Score	Rank
Elba Acuña	P2 – 10 m air pistol SH1	475	6 Q	112.6	6

Mixed

Athlete	Event	Qualification		Final	
Athlete	Event	Score	Rank	Score	Rank
María Laura Rodríguez Belvedere	R4 – 10 m air rifle standing SH2	621.5	3 Q	226.6	3rd place, bronze medalist(s)
María Laura Rodríguez Belvedere	R5 – 10 m air rifle prone SH2	634.3	2 Q	230.2	3rd place, bronze medalist(s)

== Swimming ==
Men

Athlete	Event	Heat		Final	
Athlete	Event	Time	Rank	Time	Rank
Facundo Arregui	50 m freestyle S7	34.97	8 Q	34.77	8
Iñaki Basiloff	50 m freestyle S7	31.72	5 Q	29.34	2nd place, silver medalist(s)
Lucas Poggi	50 m freestyle S7	33.87	7 Q	33.76	7
Lucas Leguiza	50 m freestyle S9	29.18	8 Q	28.64	7
Mariano Lombardi	50 m freestyle S9	28.93	7 Q	29.01	8
Nicolas Nieto	50 m freestyle S10	—N/a		26.09	5
Santiago Senestro	50 m freestyle S10	—N/a		27.05	7
Walter Piazza	50 m freestyle S11	—N/a		29.79	6
Jones Simone	50 m freestyle S13	—N/a		29.61	7
Lucas Leguiza	100 m freestyle S8	—N/a		1:04.42	4
Facundo Signorini	100 m freestyle S8	—N/a		1:06.81	6
Facundo Arregui	100 m freestyle S8	—N/a		1:14.99	8
Nicolas Nieto	100 m freestyle S10	—N/a		57.63	6
Santiago Senestro	100 m freestyle S10	—N/a		59.30	8
Lautaro Maidana	200 m freestyle S14	2:04.09	4 Q	2:02.00	4
Facundo Arregui	400 m freestyle S7	—N/a		5:04.41	3rd place, bronze medalist(s)
Iñaki Basiloff	400 m freestyle S7	—N/a		4:40.89	1st place, gold medalist(s)
Lautaro Cordoba	400 m freestyle S9	4:44.56	3 Q	4:43.97	4
Mariano Lombardi	400 m freestyle S9	5:05.07	8 Q	4:54.66	6
Facundo Signorini	400 m freestyle S9	4:59.93	6 Q	4:58.42	7
Sergioff Zayas	400 m freestyle S11	—N/a		5:17.50	3rd place, bronze medalist(s)
Franco Gomez	50 m backstroke S4	—N/a		1:01.96	7
Nicolás Ricci	50 m backstroke S4	—N/a		51.24	4
Diego Rivero	50 m backstroke S5	—N/a		44.83	5
German Arevalo	100 m backstroke S6	—N/a		1:34.45	7
Matias de Andrade	100 m backstroke S6	—N/a		1:16.72	1st place, gold medalist(s)
Iñaki Basiloff	100 m backstroke S8	—N/a		1:14.03	3rd place, bronze medalist(s)
Fernando Carlomagno	100 m backstroke S8	—N/a		1:10.35	1st place, gold medalist(s)
Lucas Leguiza	100 m backstroke S8	—N/a		1:15.55	6
Lucas Poggi	100 m backstroke S8	—N/a		1:17.59	7
Lautaro Cordoba	100 m backstroke S9	1:17.12	10	Did not advance	
Mateo Vives	100 m backstroke S9	1:17.44	11	Did not advance	
Nicolas Nieto	100 m backstroke S10	—N/a		1:05.79	3rd place, bronze medalist(s)
Santiago Senestro	100 m backstroke S10	—N/a		1:04.60	2nd place, silver medalist(s)
Sergioff Zayas	100 m backstroke S11	—N/a		1:18.77	4
Elian Araya	100 m backstroke S14	1:08.55	6 Q	1:07.82	7
Lautaro Maidana	100 m backstroke S14	1:04.11	4 Q	1:03.69	4
Diego Rivero	100 m breaststroke SB4	—N/a		1:43.00	1st place, gold medalist(s)
German Arevalo	100 m breaststroke SB5	—N/a		1:39.82	2nd place, silver medalist(s)
Iñaki Basiloff	100 m breaststroke SB6	1:30.75	5 Q	1:26.73	3rd place, bronze medalist(s)
Facundo Signorini	100 m breaststroke SB6	1:35.43	7 Q	DSQ	
Mariano Lombardi	100 m breaststroke SB9	1:25.09	9	Did not advance	
Santiago Senestro	100 m breaststroke SB9	1:13.75	3 Q	1:12.68	3rd place, bronze medalist(s)
Mateo Vives	100 m breaststroke SB9	1:25.61	10	Did not advance	
Walter Piazza	100 m breaststroke SB11	—N/a		1:26.33	5
Eilan Araya	100 m breaststroke SB14	—N/a		1:12.26	2nd place, silver medalist(s)
Matias de Andrade	50 m butterfly S6	38.13	7 Q	37.15	7
Iñaki Basiloff	50 m butterfly S7	—N/a		30.50	3rd place, bronze medalist(s)
Lucas Leguiza	100 m butterfly S8	—N/a		1:08.45	2nd place, silver medalist(s)
Facundo Signorini	100 m butterfly S8	—N/a		1:17.43	5
Lautaro Cordoba	100 m butterfly S9	1:15.98	9	Did not advance	
Mariano Lombardi	100 m butterfly S9	1:07.67	6 Q	1:08.66	7
Mateo Vives	100 m butterfly S9	1:16.65	10	Did not advance	
Nicolas Nieto	100 m butterfly S10	—N/a		1:01.16	2nd place, silver medalist(s)
Santiago Senestro	100 m butterfly S10	—N/a		1:03.83	6
Walter Piazza	100 m butterfly S11	—N/a		1:19.21	4
Sergioff Zayas	100 m butterfly S11	—N/a		1:27.13	5
Lautaro Maidana	100 m butterfly S14	—N/a		58.91	2nd place, silver medalist(s)
Nicolás Ricci	150 m individual medley SM4	—N/a		3:10.51	4
German Arevalo	200 m individual medley SM6	3:15.54	8 Q	3:13.34	6
Iñaki Basiloff	200 m individual medley SM7	—N/a		2:32.01	2nd place, silver medalist(s)
Lucas Poggi	200 m individual medley SM7	—N/a		3:11.59	5
Lucas Leguiza	200 m individual medley SM8	—N/a		2:44.70	3rd place, bronze medalist(s)
Facundo Singorini	200 m individual medley SM8	—N/a		DSQ	
Lautaro Cordoba	200 m individual medley SM9	2:51.77	10	Did not advance	
Mariano Lombardi	200 m individual medley SM9	2:37.16	6 Q	2:37.17	7
Mateo Vives	200 m individual medley SM9	2:43.40	9	Did not advance	
Santiago Senestro	200 m individual medley SM10	—N/a		2:22.25	1st place, gold medalist(s)
Walter Piazza	200 m individual medley SM11	—N/a		DSQ	
Lautaro Maidana	200 m individual medley SM14	2:22.62	4 Q	2:18.62	3rd place, bronze medalist(s)

Women

Athlete	Event	Heat		Final	
Athlete	Event	Time	Rank	Time	Rank
Ana Noriega	50 m freestyle S6	—N/a		43.54	6
Rocio Gomez	50 m freestyle S8	39.41	11	Did not advance	
Daniela Gimenez	50 m freestyle S10	—N/a		30.73	3rd place, bronze medalist(s)
Nadia Baez	50 m freestyle S11	—N/a		32.82	2nd place, silver medalist(s)
Daiana Moura	50 m freestyle S11	—N/a		47.81	6
Analuz Pellitero	50 m freestyle S11	—N/a		32.16	1st place, gold medalist(s)
Ana Noriega	100 m freestyle S5	1:32.36	3 Q	1:32.50	3rd place, bronze medalist(s)
Tiziana Forlano	100 m freestyle S5	1:47.22	8 Q	1:49.25	8
Nadia Baez	100 m freestyle S11	—N/a		1:18.40	4
Daiana Moura	100 m freestyle S11	—N/a		1:45.63	7
Analuz Pellitero	100 m freestyle S11	—N/a		1:11.14	1st place, gold medalist(s)
Ana Noriega	200 m freestyle S5	3:20.80	3 Q	3:18.61	3rd place, bronze medalist(s)
Tiziana Forlano	200 m freestyle S5	3:43.40	7 Q	3:36.79	7
Rocio Gomez	400 m freestyle S8	—N/a		6:27.24	7
Luciana Solar	400 m freestyle S9	5:43.82	7 Q	5:43.12	7
Nadia Baez	400 m freestyle S11	—N/a		DNS	
Daiana Moura	400 m freestyle S11	—N/a		7:43.19	5
Analuz Pellitero	400 m freestyle S11	—N/a		5:40.59	2nd place, silver medalist(s)
Ana Noriega	50 m backstroke S5	51.45	4 Q	52.04	4
Tiziana Forlano	50 m backstroke S5	1:00.14	9	Did not advance	
Maria Aragon	100 m backstroke S8	1:34.82	7 Q	1:34.76	7
Rocio Gomez	100 m backstroke S8	1:41.03	9	Did not advance	
Paula Ibarra	100 m backstroke S10	—N/a		1:18.19	5
Samara Acevedo	100 m backstroke S10	—N/a		1:28.97	7
Nadia Baez	100 m backstroke S11	—N/a		1:41.63	5
Analuz Pellitero	100 m backstroke S11	—N/a		1:18.25	1st place, gold medalist(s)
Samara Acevedo	100 m breaststroke SB9	—N/a		1:43.56	5
Daniela Gimenez	100 m breaststroke SB9	—N/a		1:21.53	1st place, gold medalist(s)
Paula Ibarra	100 m breaststroke SB9	—N/a		1:43.95	6
Nadia Baez	100 m breaststroke SB12	—N/a		1:29.88	3rd place, bronze medalist(s)
Daiana Moura	100 m breaststroke SB12	—N/a		DNS	
Maria Aragon	100 m butterfly S8	—N/a		1:28.34	5
Rocio Gomez	100 m butterfly S8	—N/a		1:36.76	7
Daniela Gimenez	100 m butterfly S9	—N/a		1:14.13	2nd place, silver medalist(s)
Maria Aragon	200 m individual medley SM8	3:27.78	4 Q	3:24.86	4
Rocio Gomez	200 m individual medley SM8	3:40.73	7 Q	3:36.53	7
Samara Acevedo	200 m individual medley SM10	—N/a		3:11.79	6
Paula Ibarra	200 m individual medley SM10	—N/a		3:10.27	5
Nadia Baez	200 m individual medley SM11	—N/a		3:22.01	3rd place, bronze medalist(s)
Daiana Moura	200 m individual medley SM11	—N/a		4:21.26	4
Analuz Pilletero	200 m individual medley SM11	—N/a		3:09.90	2nd place, silver medalist(s)

Mixed

Athlete	Event	Final	
Athlete	Event	Time	Rank
Matias de Andrade; Tiziana Forlano; Ana Noriega; Nicolás Ricci	4 × 50 m freestyle relay 20pts	2:57.58	4
Daniela Gimenez; Nicolas Nieto; Rocio Gomez; Iñaki Basiloff	4 × 100 m freestyle relay 34pts	DSQ	
Walter Piazza; Nadia Baez; Analuz Pilletero; Jones Simone	4 × 100 m freestyle relay 49pts	4:45.76	4
Matias de Andrade; Tiziana Forlano; Ana Noriega; Diego Rivero	4 × 50 m medley relay 20pts	3:06.87	4
Daniela Gimenez; Santiago Senestro; Maria Aragon; Iñaki Basiloff	4 × 100 m medley relay 34pts	4:56.18	4
Walter Piazza; Nadia Baez; Analuz Pilletero; Jones Simone	4 × 100 m medley relay 49pts	5:12.25	3rd place, bronze medalist(s)

== Table tennis ==
Men

Athlete	Event	Preliminaries					Round of 16	Quarterfinals	Semifinals	Final / BM	
Athlete	Event	Opposition Result	Opposition Result	Opposition Result	Opposition Result	Rank	Opposition Result	Opposition Result	Opposition Result	Opposition Result	Rank
José Bustamante	Singles C1	Eberhardt (ARG); W 3–0	Leiva (CHI); W 3–0	Godfrey (USA); W 3–0	Fernández (CUB); L 2–3	2	—N/a				2nd place, silver medalist(s)
Fernando Eberhardt	Singles C1	Bustamante (ARG); L 0–3	Leiva (CHI); L 1–3	Fernández (CUB); L 0–3	Godfrey (USA); W 3–0	4	—N/a				4
Gabriel Copola	Singles C3	Avendaño (GUA); W 3–0	Valencia (COL); W 3–0	Quijada (VEN); L 2–3	—N/a	2 Q	—N/a	Freitas (BRA); W 3–0	Van Emburgh (USA); L 1–3	Did not advance	3rd place, bronze medalist(s)
Carlos Bienati	Singles C3	Freitas (BRA); L 1–3	Nodarse (CUB); W 3–1	Acosta (URU); L 0–3	—N/a	3	Did not advance				
Elías Romero	Singles C5	Salazar (GUA); W 3–0	Moraes (BRA); W 3–1	—N/a		1 Q	—N/a		Depergola (ARG); W 3–0	Arabian (BRA); W 3–2	1st place, gold medalist(s)
Mauro Depergola	Singles C5	Sarand (USA); W 3–1	Arabian (BRA); L 0–3	—N/a		2 Q	—N/a		Romero (ARG); L 0–3	Did not advance	3rd place, bronze medalist(s)
Luciano Khazandjian	Singles C7	Stroh (BRA); L 1–3	Bahamondes (CHI); L 1–3	—N/a		3	Did not advance				
Aleksy Kaniuka	Singles C7	Salmin (BRA); L 0–3	Córdoba (PAN); W 3–0	Castro (COL); W 3–1	—N/a	2 Q	—N/a	Martinez (ARG); W 3–0	Stroh (BRA); L 1–3	Did not advance	3rd place, bronze medalist(s)
Emanuel Martinez	Singles C7	Castro (MEX); W 3–1	Evans (PAN); W 3–0	Vargas (COL); L 1–3	—N/a	2 Q	—N/a	Kaniuka (ARG); L 0–3	Did not advance		
Fausto Barrientos	Singles C8	Cordova (ESA); W 3–1	Guarnieri (BRA); L 0–3	—N/a		2 Q	—N/a	Pérez (ARG); L 1–3	Did not advance		
Alejandro Pérez	Singles C8	Kent (CAN); W 3–1	Mashki (BRA); W 3–1	Makkar (USA); W 3–1	—N/a	1 Q	—N/a	Barrientos (ARG); W 3–1	Roman (CRC); L 1–3	Did not advance	3rd place, bronze medalist(s)
Eithan Skliarsky	Singles C9	Carvalho (BRA); L 0–3	López (PUR); W WDR	—N/a		2 Q	—N/a	Rivera (PUR); W WDR	Leibovitz (USA); L 0–3	Did not advance	3rd place, bronze medalist(s)
Darío Neira	Singles C10	Antunes (BRA); L 0–3	Orellana (GUA); W 3–0	—N/a		2 Q	—N/a	Puerto (COL); L 0–3	Did not advance		
Fernando Eberhardt; José Bustamante	Doubles C4	Flores / Leiva (CHI); L 0–3	Marcião / Espíndola (BRA); L 0–3	Fernández / Nodarse (CUB); W 3–2	—N/a	3	—N/a				3
Carlos Bienati; Mauro Depergola	Doubles C8	—N/a					Quijada / Sandoval (VEN); L WDR	Did not advance			
Gabriel Copola; Elías Romero	Doubles C8	—N/a					Bye	Freitas / Moraes (BRA); L 2–3	Did not advance		
Aleksy Kaniuka; Emanuel Martinez	Doubles C14	Stroh / Salmin (BRA); L 0–3	Roman / Arguello (CRC); L 1–3	—N/a		3	—N/a	Did not advance			
Fausto Barrientos; Eithan Skliarsky	Doubles C18	—N/a					Antunes / Mashki (BRA); L 0–3	Did not advance			
Alejandro Pérez; Darío Neira	Doubles C18	—N/a					Cordova / Muñoz (ESA); W 3–2	Bahamondes / Echaveguren (CHI); L 1–3	Did not advance		

Women

Athlete	Event	Preliminaries					Quarterfinals	Semifinals	Final / BM	
Athlete	Event	Opposition Result	Opposition Result	Opposition Result	Opposition Result	Rank	Opposition Result	Opposition Result	Opposition Result	Rank
Veronica Blanco	Singles C1–3	Oliveira (BRA); L 0–3	Fontaine (USA); W 3–0	—N/a		2 Q	Santos (BRA); L 0–3	Did not advance		
Maria Garrone	Singles C1–3	Maia (BRA); W 3–0	Santos (BRA); L 1–3	—N/a		2 Q	Oliveira (BRA); L 0–3	Did not advance		
Nayla Kuell	Singles C4–5	Leonelli (CHI); L 2–3	Miranda (ESA); W 3–0	Rolph (USA); W 3–0	—N/a	2 Q	—N/a	Sanchez (COL); W 3–0	Leonelli (CHI); L 2–3	2nd place, silver medalist(s)
Giselle Muñoz	Singles C6–7	Meneses (BRA); W 3–0	Mazuera (COL); W 3–0	—N/a		1 Q	—N/a	Chan (CAN); W 3–0	Perez (MEX); L 2–3	2nd place, silver medalist(s)
Maria Garrone; Nayla Kuell	Doubles C5–10	Santos / Severo (BRA); L 2–3	Leonelli / Ortiz (CHI); W 3–0	Verdin / Sigala (MEX); W 3–0	—N/a	2 Q	—N/a	Oliveira / Oliveira (BRA); L 0–3	Did not advance	3rd place, bronze medalist(s)

Mixed

Athlete	Event	Round of 16	Quarterfinals	Semifinals	Final / BM	
Athlete	Event	Opposition Result	Opposition Result	Opposition Result	Opposition Result	Rank
Elías Romero; Maria Garrone	Doubles C4–7	Bye	Reyes / Sigala (MEX); W 3–2	Arabian / Oliveira (BRA); L 0–3	Did not advance	3rd place, bronze medalist(s)
Gabriel Copola; Nayla Kuell	Doubles C10	Bye	Pickett / Rolph (USA); W 3–0	Silva / Oliveira (BRA); L 0–3	Did not advance	3rd place, bronze medalist(s)
Mauro Depergola; Veronica Blanco	Doubles C10	Bye	Rodriguez / Leonelli (CHI); L 0–3	Did not advance		
Darío Neira; Giselle Muñoz	Doubles C14–17	Bye	Pino / Yevenes (CHI); W 3–1	Stroh / Parinos (BRA); L 0–3	Did not advance	3rd place, bronze medalist(s)

== Taekwondo ==
Men

Athlete	Event	Round of 16	Quarterfinals	Semifinals	Repechage	Final / BM	
Athlete	Event	Opposition Result	Opposition Result	Opposition Result	Opposition Result	Opposition Result	Rank
Leandro Fernandez	−58 kg	Benítez (CUB); W 19–5	Fernandez (PER); W 40–9	Torres (MEX); L 20–43	Bye	Bronze medal final Nascimento (BRA); L 25–30	=5
Miguel Galeano	−58 kg	Velásquez (COL); W 29–14	Torres (MEX); L 17–37	Did not advance	Fernandez (PER); L 19–22	Did not advance	
Facundo Novik	−63 kg	—N/a	Liborio (MEX); W 12–6	Torquato (BRA); L 6–27	Bye	Bronze medal final Mayor (CUB); L 9–12	=5
Juan Samorano	−70 kg	Bye	Peña (COL); W 28–7	Cano (MEX); W 22–9	Bye	Suarez (CUB); W 21–20	1st place, gold medalist(s)

== Wheelchair basketball ==
Summary

Team	Event	Group stage				Quarterfinal	Semifinal	Final / BM	
Team	Event	Opposition Score	Opposition Score	Opposition Score	Rank	Opposition Score	Opposition Score	Opposition Score	Rank
Argentina men's	Men's tournament	Venezuela; W 72–44	Chile; W 84–30	Canada; L 49–56	2 Q	Brazil; W 62–43	United States; L 54–88	Bronze medal match Canada; L 62–70	4
Argentina women's	Women's tournament	Peru; W 58–28	Chile; W 60–21	United States; L 26–87	2 Q	—N/a	Canada; L 36–76	Bronze medal match Brazil; L 28–56	4

Roster men's team

- Carlos Esteche
- Javier Rodriguez
- Joel Gabas
- Franco Alessandrini
- Brian Bordon
- Juan Celiz
- Maximiliano Ruggeri
- Daniel Copa
- Matias Mendez
- Adrian Perez
- Lucas Muller
- Lucas Silva

Roster women's team

- Micaela Rosales
- Evangelina Paiva
- Maria Chirinos
- Mariana Redi
- Silvia Linari
- Julieta Olmedo
- Maria Pallares
- Mariana Perez
- Luna Diaz
- Dara Muñoz
- Vanesa Salcedo
- Morena Coria

== Wheelchair rugby ==
Summary

Team	Event	Group stage						Semifinal	Final / BM	
Team	Event	Opposition Score	Opposition Score	Opposition Score	Opposition Score	Opposition Score	Rank	Opposition Score	Opposition Score	Rank
Argentina national team	Mixed tournament	Canada; L 30–63	United States; L 31–55	Brazil; L 37–58	Chile; W 77–34	Colombia; L 50–56	5	Did not advance	Fifth place match Chile; W 64–46	5

Roster

- Juan Manuel Herrera
- Facundo Costanzo
- Matias Cardozo
- Mauro Castro
- Rodrigo Zambrano
- Gustavo Santoro
- Roberto Fernandez
- Mariano Gastaldi
- Fernando Gomez
- Juan Bandini
- Lautaro Giovannini
- Joselino Gomez

== Wheelchair tennis ==
Men

Athlete	Event	Round of 32	Round of 16	Quarterfinals	Semifinals	Final / BM	
Athlete	Event	Opposition Result	Opposition Result	Opposition Result	Opposition Result	Opposition Result	Rank
Gustavo Fernandez	Singles	Bye	Tapia (CHI); W 6–1, 6–2	Gil (CRC); W 6–1, 6–0	Rodrigues (BRA); W 6–2, 6–1	Cataldo (CHI); W 6–2, 6–0	1st place, gold medalist(s)
Ezequiel Casco	Singles	Bye	Varela (URU); W 6–1, 6–2	Ratzlaff (USA); L 3–6, 4–6	Did not advance		
Ezequiel Casco; Gustavo Fernandez	Doubles	—N/a	Bye	Oquendo / Sanchez (COL); W 6–4, 6–1	Tapia / Cataldo (CHI); W 6–1, 0–6, 11–9	Carneiro / Rodrigues (BRA); W 5–7, 6–1, 10–3	1st place, gold medalist(s)

Women

Athlete	Event	Round of 16	Quarterfinals	Semifinals	Final / BM	
Athlete	Event	Opposition Result	Opposition Result	Opposition Result	Opposition Result	Rank
Maria Florencia Moreno	Singles	Quesada (CRC); W 6–0, 6–0	Martínez (COL); W 6–1, 6–1	Mathewson (USA); L 2–6, 6–7	Bronze medal match Cabrillana (CHI); L 6–4, 3–6, 6–7	4

Quad

Athlete	Event	Round of 16	Quarterfinals	Semifinals	Final / BM	
Athlete	Event	Opposition Result	Opposition Result	Opposition Result	Opposition Result	Rank
Leandro Oscar Bas	Singles	Pérez (CHI); L 1–6, 1–6	Did not advance			

== See also ==
- Argentina at the 2023 Pan American Games
- Argentina at the 2024 Summer Paralympics
