= Athletics at the 2023 Parapan American Games – Men's 100 metres T36 =

Men's 100 metres T36 at the 2023 Parapan American Games
- Venue: Mario Recordón Athletics Training Center
- Dates: November 24
- Competitors: 8 from 6 nations
- Winning time: 11.83

Medalists
1st place, gold medalist(s)		Alexis Sebastian Chavez	Argentina
2nd place, silver medalist(s)		Aser Almeida	Brazil
3rd place, bronze medalist(s)		Fabricio López	Argentina

The men's T36 100 metres competition of the athletics events at the 2023 Parapan American Games was held on November 24 at the Mario Recordón Athletics Training Center within the Julio Martínez National Stadium of Santiago, Chile.

== Records ==
Prior to this competition, the existing world and Pan American Games records were as follows:

World record	James Turner (AUS)	11.72	Dubai, United Arab Emirates	November 10, 2019
Parapan American Games record	Alexis Sebastian Chavez (ARG)	12.24	Lima, Peru	August 27, 2019
Americas record	Alexis Sebastian Chavez (ARG)	11.91	Tokyo, Japan	September 3, 2021

== Schedule ==
Date	Time	Round
November 24, 2023	19:32	Final

== Results ==
All times shown are in seconds.

KEY:	q	Fastest non-qualifiers	Q	Qualified	PR	Parapan Games record	NR	National record	SB	Seasonal best	DQ	Disqualified

=== Final ===
The results were as follows:
Wind: +1.1 m/s

Rank	Lane	Name	Nationality	Time	Notes
1st place, gold medalist(s)	6	Alexis Sebastian Chavez	Argentina	11.83	PR
2nd place, silver medalist(s)	5	Aser Almeida	Brazil	12.18	SB
3rd place, bronze medalist(s)	3	Fabricio López	Argentina	12.24	SB
4	4	Omar Acosta	Colombia	12.54	
5	1	Adonys Rosa	Dominican Republic	12.60	
6	7	Alan Zavala	Mexico	13.15	SB
7	2	Conner Pierce	United States	14.48	
8	8	Rodrigo Parreira da Silva	Brazil	30.04	
