= Judo at the 2023 Parapan American Games – Women's 57 kg =

Women's 57 kg at the 2023 Parapan American Games
- Venue: Contact Sports Center
- Dates: November 19
- Competitors: 9 from 7 nations

Medalists
1st place, gold medalist(s)		Lúcia Teixeira	Brazil
2nd place, silver medalist(s)		Maria Liana Mutia	United States
3rd place, bronze medalist(s)		Paula Gómez	Argentina
3rd place, bronze medalist(s)		Laura González	Argentina

The women's 57 kg competition of the judo events at the 2023 Parapan American Games was held on November 19 at the Contact Sports Center (Centro de Entrenamiento de los Deportes de Contacto) in Santiago, Chile. A total of 9 athletes from 7 NOC's competed.

== Results ==
=== Repechage ===
Repechage
Larissa Oliveira (BRA)	10
Christina Mowatt (CAN)	00
Eslendy Lamadrid (COL)	10
Estefanía Martínez (CHI)	00

Bronze metal match
Larissa Oliveira (BRA)	01
Paula Gómez (ARG)	10
Eslendy Lamadrid (COL)	00
Laura González (ARG)	10

=== Main Bracket ===
Round of 16
Eslendy Lamadrid (COL)	10
Dainelis Calunga (CUB)	00

Quarterfinals
Maria Liana Mutia (USA)	10
Larissa Oliveira (BRA)	00
Laura González (ARG)	10
Christina Mowatt (CAN)	00
Lúcia Teixeira (BRA)	01
Eslendy Lamadrid (COL)	00
Paula Gómez (ARG)	10
Estefanía Martínez (CHI)	00

Semifinals
Maria Liana Mutia (USA)	10
Laura González (ARG)	00
Lúcia Teixeira (BRA)	10
Paula Gómez (ARG)	00

Final
Maria Liana Mutia (USA)	00
Lúcia Teixeira (BRA)	10
