= Cycling at the 2023 Parapan American Games – Women's road time trial B =

Women's road time trial B at the 2023 Parapan American Games
- Venue: Streets of Isla de Maipo
- Dates: November 19
- Competitors: 4 from 3 nations
- Winning time: 33:14.22

Medalists
1st place, gold medalist(s)		Bianca Canovas; Guide: Nicolle Borges	Brazil
2nd place, silver medalist(s)		María José Quiroga; Guide: Micaela Barroso	Argentina
3rd place, bronze medalist(s)		María Agustina Cruceño; Guide: Mayra Tocha	Argentina

The women's individual road time trial B competition of the cycling events at the 2023 Parapan American Games was held on November 19 on the Streets of Isla de Maipo, Chile.

== Schedule ==
Date	Time	Round
November 19, 2023	08:07	Final

== Results ==
The results were as follows:

Rank	Rider	Nation	Time
1st place, gold medalist(s)	Bianca Canovas; Guide: Nicolle Borges	Brazil	33:14.22
2nd place, silver medalist(s)	María José Quiroga; Guide: Micaela Barroso	Argentina	34:16.25
3rd place, bronze medalist(s)	María Agustina Cruceño; Guide: Mayra Tocha	Argentina	34:55.88
	Hannah Chadwick-Dias; Guide: Skyler Espinoza	United States	DNS
