= Athletics at the 2023 Parapan American Games – Men's 400 metres T36 =

Men's 400 metres T36 at the 2023 Parapan American Games
- Venue: Mario Recordón Athletics Training Center
- Dates: November 22
- Competitors: 7 from 4 nations
- Winning time: 54.63

Medalists
| 1st place, gold medalist(s) | | Alexis Sebastian Chavez | Argentina |
| 2nd place, silver medalist(s) | | Alan Zavala | Mexico |
| 3rd place, bronze medalist(s) | | Fabricio López | Argentina |

The men's T36 400 metres competition of the athletics events at the 2023 Parapan American Games was held on November 22 at the Mario Recordón Athletics Training Center within the Julio Martínez National Stadium of Santiago, Chile.

== Records ==
Prior to this competition, the existing world and Pan American Games records were as follows:

| World record | James Turner (AUS) | 51.71 | Dubai, United Arab Emirates | November 14, 2019 |
| Parapan American Games record | Juan Moreno Marquez (COL) | 57.62 | Toronto, Canada | August 14, 2015 |
| Americas record | Alexis Sebastian Chavez (ARG) | 54.57 | Paris, France | July 11, 2023 |

== Schedule ==
| Date | Time | Round |
|---|---|---|
| November 22, 2023 | 15:27 | Final |

== Results ==
All times shown are in seconds.

| KEY: | q | Fastest non-qualifiers | Q | Qualified | PR | Parapan Games record | NR | National record | SB | Seasonal best | DQ | Disqualified |

=== Final ===
The results were as follows:

| Rank | Lane | Name | Nationality | Time | Notes |
|---|---|---|---|---|---|
| 1st place, gold medalist(s) | 6 | Alexis Sebastian Chavez | Argentina | 54.63 | PR |
| 2nd place, silver medalist(s) | 4 | Alan Zavala | Mexico | 57.04 | SB |
| 3rd place, bronze medalist(s) | 3 | Fabricio López | Argentina | 58.05 | SB |
| 4 | 2 | Adonys Rosa | Dominican Republic | 58.41 | |
| 5 | 5 | Santiago Markieviche | Argentina | 59.92 | |
| 6 | 7 | Conner Pierce | United States | 1:10.26 | |
| 7 | 8 | Yonathan Martínez | Mexico | 1:11.57 | |
