= Chicano murals =

A Chicano mural is an artistic expression done, most commonly, on walls or ceilings by Chicanos or Mexican-American artists. Chicano murals rose during the Chicano art movement, that began in the 1960s, with the influence of Mexican muralism and the Mexican Revolution. The murals are an illustration of Chicano’s ethnic pride or a form of activism against police brutality, social issues, political issues, and civil rights issues. It started being done by young Chicano artists in commonly marginalized neighborhoods, schools, and churches, demonstrating cultural art and ideas. The murals are characterized by their art style of bright color, religious symbols, and cultural references to Mexican and Mexican American history. Chicano murals have been and are historically found in the Southwest states like Texas, Colorado, and most famously, California, where the national landmark Chicano Park is located. The popularity of the Chicano Murals has allowed a sense of community, culture, activism, and storytelling about elements of being Chicano. Various states are currently looking to preserve and restore some murals as they carry historical meaning for the geographical community and the Mexican-American community.

== History ==
In the early 1920s, muralism was created, in the way that is currently seen, because of the Mexican muralism movement, which was influenced by the Mexican Revolution. During this time, the government paid artists to create murals to educate the illiterate Mexicans about what was politically and socially occurring in their country. Muralism helped illustrate what the revolution could have led to and what history had done for Mexicans. With this, the government aimed to rise in popularity and gain control over the narrative of the revolution.

In the late 1960s, African American Civil Rights inspired the Chicano Civil Rights movement, or "El Movimiento", in which Chicano fought against their treatment in the United States after the Treaty of Guadalupe Hidalgo did not have the effects that the Mexican American community expected, the movement fought against segregation, mistreatment, educational inequality, and more. During this time, Chicanos, specifically young Chicanos, started to create art to express their feeling about political, social, and economic issues, which led to the Chicano Art Movement, similar to what occurred during the Mexican Revolution but without government funding. The Chicano Art Movement aids in portraying and focusing on the discrimination and treatment of Mexican Americans during this time. The Chicano Art Movement led to the popularity of murals as an art medium as it was more accessible for the artist and for people to see the art. In the 1990s, during the last stretch of the second wave of feminism, some Chicana artists struck for change by creating art that portrayed their political views. During this time, Chicana artist went to the streets to create their art, as they were not commonly accepted in museums compared to their Anglo-American counterparts. This form of mural focused on women's struggles, gender stereotypes, cultural perspectives, and Mexican-American struggles. These murals are commonly associated with the rise of female mural artists and a rise in the leadership of Chicana artists.Including, Yreina Cervántez, Alma Lopez, and Barbara Carrasco.

In the 2020s, Chicano murals have been part of multiple preservation and restoration projects with the intention to maintain Chicano culture pride developing in places like California, with Chicano Park, and Colorado, with La Alma Lincoln Park Recreation Center. Most states that historically and currently have Chicano/Mexican-American murals are bordering states and the Southwest.

== Murals ==
=== California ===
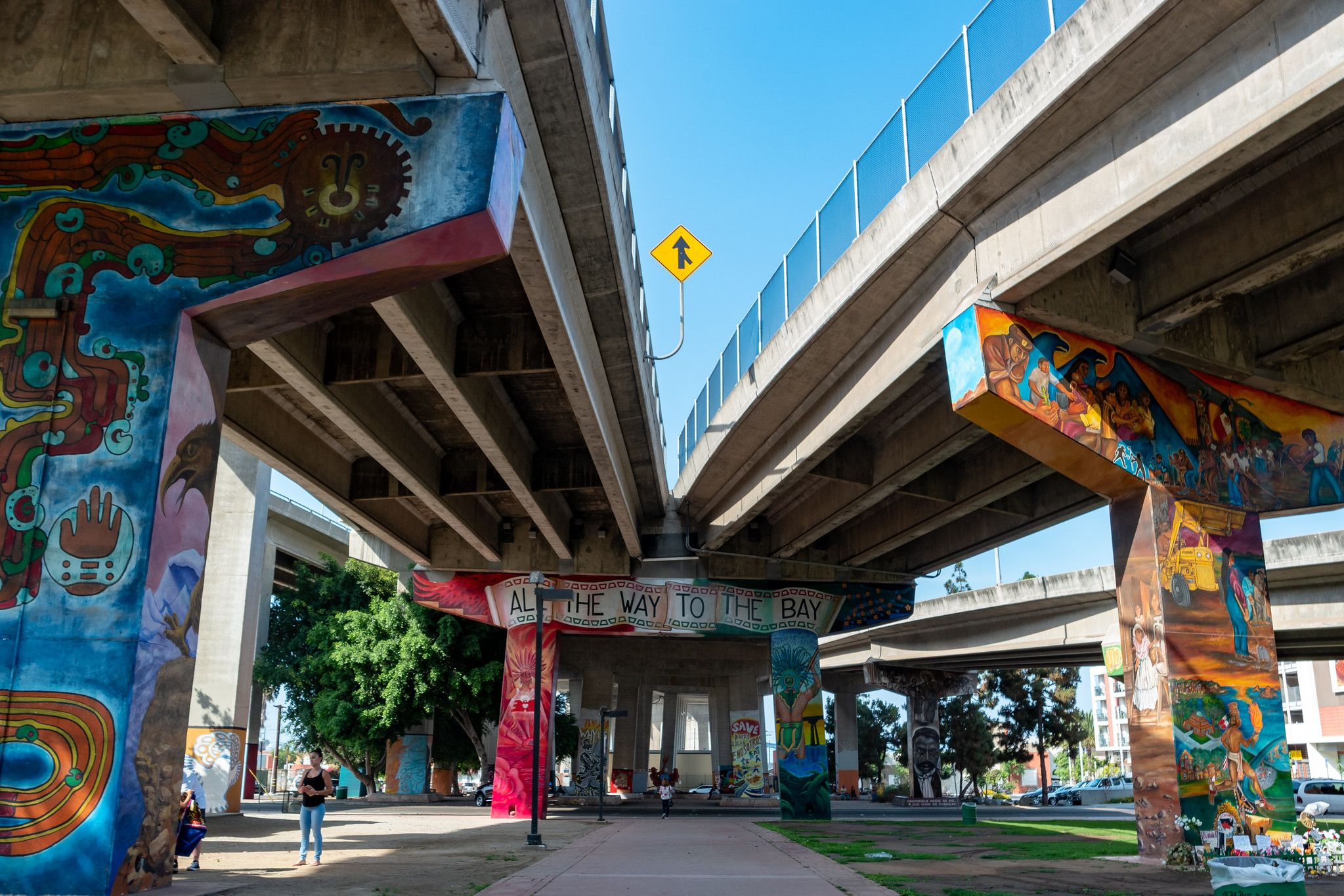
"All the Way to the Bay" in Chicano Park

Chicano art in California has appeared in urban areas, exploring the expression of indigenous expressions of Chicano culture. The first recorded Chicano Mural was found in California, in Delano, painted on United Farm Workers union headquarters, which at the time was led by Cesar Chavez and Dolores Huerta. California's movement of government as areas that are adjacent to the Mexican border their Mexican population is higher than other places affected by "El Movimiento". Historically, it has been recorded that projects such as Chicano murals in California have been connecting to the politics of minorities found in marginalized neighborhoods.

==== Chicano Park ====
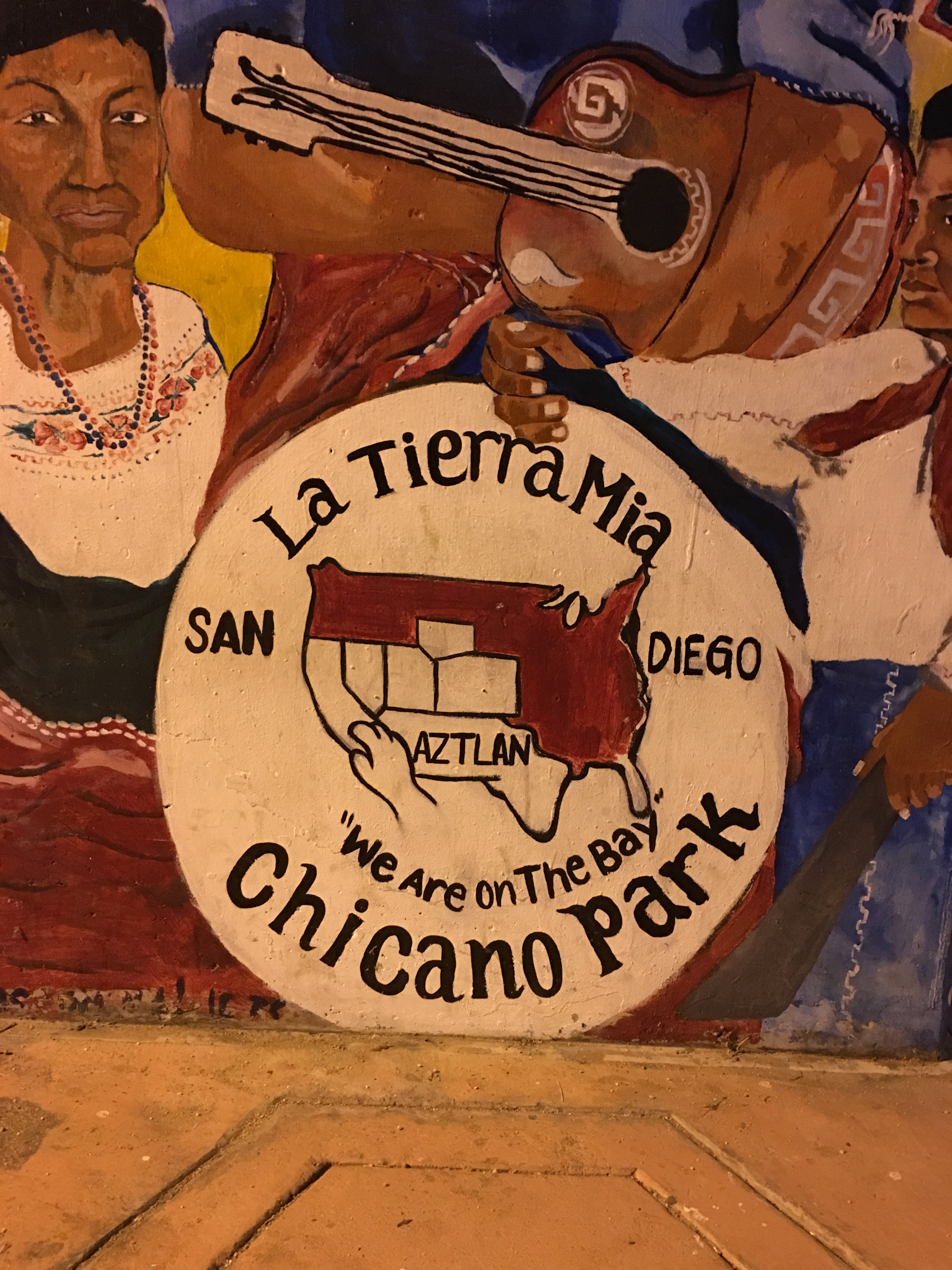
La Tierra Mia Mural- With the Chicano Park Logo.

California had the first Chicano art gallery in 1969 as part of the Chicano movement. Chicano Park is located in the San Diego area. The Chicano part has historical importance in the Chicano Community. For community residents of San Diego during the issuing problem and resentment in the 1950s, a space for Mexican Americans was demanded; The Brown Berets was one of the influential groups for the creation of the area. In 1969, Chicano Park was designed to give Chicanos a space to express their political and social concerns through art.

==== San Francisco ====
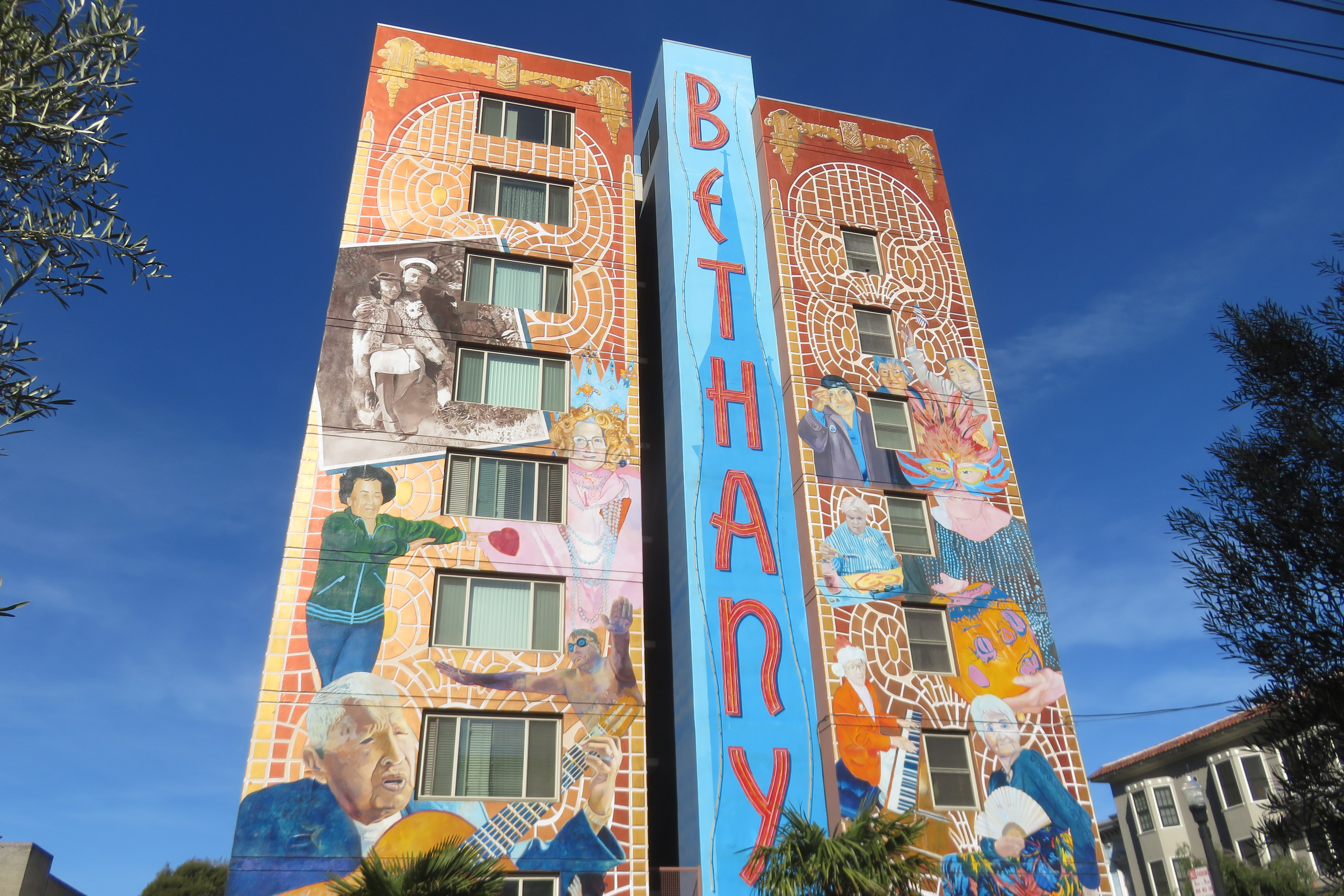
San Francisco’s Mission District- Chicano Art.

San Francisco has a diverse community with different expressions of community and struggles. The diversity enabled the Chicano community to demonstrate their identity through muralism. Organizations like the San Francisco Museum of Modern Art have created digital preservation programs called "Proyecto Mission Murals" which look to preserve the art and their history.

===== El Centro Chicano y Latino at Stanford University =====
El Centro Chicano y Latino was created in 1978-79 by Stanford University plan to support their Mexican American community and students. The center claims that they look for inclusion of the Chicano student and seeks to create spaces to inspire the celebration of culture.

Casa Zapata at Stanford University

Casa Zapata, named after Emiliano Zapata, is Stanford’s Latinx-themed ethnic dorm, founded in 1972. It is located on the eastern part of the Stanford campus and is a four-class dorm. Originally founded to meet the needs of Stanford’s Mexican and Mexican American students, the dorm now represents a broader range of the Latine experience, specifically highlighting Latine communities that are not exclusively Mexican. In recent years, there has been a particular emphasis by dorm staff to make programming more inclusive of Afro-Latinx, Indigenous, and Queer voices.

The dorm is home to murals showcasing Chicano and Latino art, created by students. The first mural, painted by Zarco Guerrero and titled "A Reaction to Violence and Institutional Racism in the Media," was created in 1974, just two years after Casa Zapata’s opening. There are 23 murals connected to the dorm (four on the exterior, 10 inside the dorm, and nine in other areas such as the lounge, basement, or dining hall). Some examples include The Lotería Mural at Casa Zapata, which visually mimics the traditional Mexican game, "Loteria," by presenting a wall of illustrated “cards” each symbolizing a region, idea, or value associated with Latinidad. Another example is The Founding of Aztlán, which depicts the Aztec legend of the founding of Mexico City.

=== Colorado ===
Colorado is one of the states establishing a preservation, conservation, and memorial of historical and almost extinct Chicano murals. Denver has included Chicano murals as "11 Most Endangered Historic Places" of the most historically extinct historical pieces to The National Trust for Historic Preservation. Chicanos are being highlighted in the media as an important part of the culture and history of Colorado.

==== La Alma Lincoln Park Recreation Center ====
La Alma Lincoln Recreational Center has been considered one of the most important historic places in Denver's Chicano Community. It has been producing public art and stories from the Chicano Movement of the 1960s and 1970s, as the Chicano community felt marginalized. Historic Denver describes this area as the center of Denver's Chicano Movement, as it is located in one of the oldest residential neighborhoods.

===== "La Alma" by Emanuel Martinez =====
La Alma Lincoln Park Neighborhood was used in early 1969 as a painting area for Chicano artists like Emanuel Martinez with "La Alma". Emanuel Martinez is considered one of the pioneers in Chicago of Chicano murals. " La Alma" is the mural currently standing and part of restoration plans as they aimed to preserve it as is historically important to the community. Emanuel Martinez explains that the meaning of this mural is Martinez's connection to his community and aims to portray the duality of culture. Emanuel Martinez used to educate Denver's high schoolers in 10th to 12th grade about "The Mexican Muralist Movement and an Exploration of Public Art" and La Alma's meaning and influence on the Chicano Mural Movement.

=== Texas ===
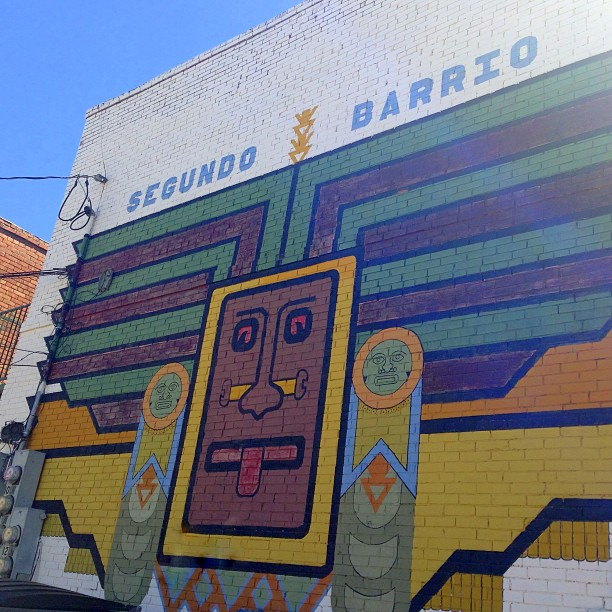
"Segundo Barrio" is a mural found in El Paso

As part of being one of the border states, Texas saw the wave of the Chicano movement in the 1960s, which caused the growth of Chicano cultural pride. The first Chicano mural recorded in Texas was found in Houston, “La Historia Chicana” by Jesse Trevino, at the Student Union Building of Our Lady of the Lake University.

==== Mexic-Arte Museum at Austin ====
Mexic-Arte Museum is based on Mexican and Mexican-American Artists with the mission to educate about Latin American art and the preservation of their craft. The museum yearly allows Mexican-American artists to create and paint a culturally or politically significant mural by the museum’s 5th Street wall.

==== Segundo barrio at El Paso ====
“El Segundo Barrio” or “The Second Neighborhood” in El Paso, Texas is one of the oldest Hispanic neighborhoods and the first Mexican Border town. Historically, murals in this are prevalent to demonstrate the bordering ideas of the duality of Mexican Americans. In 2016, the neighborhood was part of the Most Endangered Places in Texas.
