= Football 5-a-side at the 2023 Parapan American Games =

Blind football competitions at the 2023 Parapan American Games

- Football 5-a-side pictogram
- Venue: Paralympic Training Center
- Dates: 18 – 25 November 2023
- No. of events: 1 (1 men)
- Competitors: 60 from 6 nations

Medalists
1st place, gold medalist(s)		Brazil
2nd place, silver medalist(s)		Colombia
3rd place, bronze medalist(s)		Argentina

Football 5-a-side or blind football competitions at the 2023 Parapan American Games in Santiago, Chile were held at the Paralympic Training Center from 18 to 25 November 2023.

The winner of the competition were automatically qualify to the 2024 Summer Paralympics.

== Participating nations ==
There are 60 players from 6 nations participating in the games.

- Argentina (10)
- Brazil (10)
- Chile (10) (Host)
- Colombia (10)
- Mexico (10)
- Peru (10)

== Medal summary ==
=== Medal table ===
* Host nation (Chile)

Rank	Nation	Gold	Silver	Bronze	Total
1	Brazil	1	0	0	1
2	Colombia	0	1	0	1
3	Argentina	0	0	1	1
Totals (3 entries)		1	1	1	3

=== Medalists ===
Event	Gold	Silver	Bronze
Men's tournament	Brazil (BRA); Luan de Lacerda; Maicon Junior; Cassio Lopes; Jardiel Soares; Jeferson da Conceição; Raimundo Nonato; Tiago Paraná; Ricardo Alves; Matheus Bum; Jonatan da Silva	Colombia (COL); Dario Ardilla; Fredy Gomes; Duvian Lopez; Enrique Martínez; Alberto Lopez; Alexander Hernández; Nicolás Coca; Jhon Eider Gonzales; David Pérez; Andrés Jaramillo	Argentina (ARG); Guido Consoni; Ángel Deldo; Nahuel Heredia; Froilán Padilla; Daniel Iturria; Jesús Merlos; Maximiliano Espinillo; Ezequiel Fernándes; Mario Fabián Durval Ríos; Germán Muleck

== Preliminary round ==
Pos	Team	Pld	W	D	L	GF	GA	GD	Pts	Qualification
1	Brazil	5	4	0	1	9	1	+8	12	Gold medal match
2	Colombia	5	4	0	1	9	1	+8	12	Gold medal match
3	Argentina	5	4	0	1	8	1	+7	12	Bronze medal match
4	Chile	5	1	1	3	2	7	−5	4	Bronze medal match
5	Mexico	5	0	2	3	1	9	−8	2	5th–6th place match
6	Peru	5	0	1	4	1	11	−10	1	5th–6th place match

Source: PASO
November 18
16:00

Chile	0–2	Argentina
	Report	Espinillo 24', 27'

Paralympic Training Center, Santiago
Referee: Lucio Pinheiro (Brazil)

November 18
18:00

Mexico	0–1	Brazil
	Report	Nonato 6'

Paralympic Training Center, Santiago
Referee: Luis Oliveros (Colombia)

November 18
20:00

Colombia	2–0	Peru
Pérez 13', 3'	Report

Paralympic Training Center, Santiago
Referee: Alfredo Martínez (Mexico)

November 19
16:00

Chile	0–2	Brazil
	Report	Alves 11'; Nonato 0'

Paralympic Training Center, Santiago
Referee: Alfredo Martínez (Mexico)

November 19
18:00

Mexico	0–3	Colombia
	Report	Pérez 9'; González 8', 1'

Paralympic Training Center, Santiago
Referee: Lucio Pinheiro (Brazil)

November 19
20:00

Argentina	1–0	Peru
Fernandes 9'	Report

Paralympic Training Center, Santiago
Referee: Ellen Grosskopf (Brazil)

November 20
16:00

Brazil	1–0	Colombia
Nonato 26'	Report

Paralympic Training Center, Santiago
Referee: Alfredo Martínez (Mexico)

November 20
18:00

Chile	2–0	Peru
Campos 22'; Silva 29'	Report

Paralympic Training Center, Santiago
Referee: Ellen Grosskopf (Brazil)

November 20
20:00

Argentina	4–0	Mexico
Espinillo 5'; Durval 12', 25', 26'	Report

Paralympic Training Center, Santiago
Referee: Luis Oliveros (Colombia)

November 22
16:00

Chile	0–3	Colombia
	Report	Pérez 6', 15'; Gonzalez 16'

Paralympic Training Center, Santiago
Referee: Lucio Pinheiro (Brazil)

November 22
18:00

Brazil	0–1	Argentina
	Report	Espinillo 2'

Paralympic Training Center, Santiago
Referee: Alfredo Martínez (Mexico)

November 22
20:00

Peru	1–1	Mexico
Pérez 13'	Report	Rangel 29'

Paralympic Training Center, Santiago
Referee: Jesús Sanchez (Colombia)

November 23
16:00

Colombia	1–0	Argentina
Gonzalez 2'	Report

Paralympic Training Center, Santiago
Referee: Lucio Pinheiro (Brazil)

November 23
18:00

Peru	0–5	Brazil
	Report	Alves 6', 9', 11'; Paraná 10'; Santos 27'

Paralympic Training Center, Santiago
Referee: Luis Oliveros (Colombia)

November 23
20:00

Chile	0–0	Mexico
	Report

Paralympic Training Center, Santiago
Referee: Ellen Grosskopf (Brazil)

== Knockout stage ==
=== Fifth place match ===
November 25
16:00

Mexico	0–0	Peru
	Report
Penalties
Rivera (penalty missed); Sotelo (penalty missed); Rangel (penalty scored)	1–0	(penalty missed) Bartolo; (penalty missed) Estrada; (penalty missed) Pérez

Paralympic Training Center, Santiago
Referee: Pamela Gutierrez (Chile)

=== Bronze medal match ===
November 25
18:00

Argentina	2–0	Chile
Espinillo 10', 16'	Report

Paralympic Training Center, Santiago
Referee: Lucio Pinheiro (Brazil)

=== Gold medal match ===
November 25
20:00

Brazil	1–0	Colombia
Alves	Report

Paralympic Training Center, Santiago
Referee: Alfredo Martínez (Mexico)

== Final ranking ==
Rank	Team
Gold medal	Brazil
Silver medal	Colombia
Bronze medal	Argentina
4	Chile
5	Mexico
6	Peru

== See also ==
- Football at the 2023 Pan American Games
- Football 5-a-side at the 2024 Summer Paralympics
