= Cycling at the 2023 Parapan American Games – Men's road race B =

Men's road race B at the 2023 Parapan American Games
- Venue: Streets of Isla de Maipo
- Dates: November 26
- Competitors: 6 from 5 nations
- Winning time: 2:03.31

Medalists
| 1st place, gold medalist(s) | | Maximiliano Gómez; Guide: Sebastián Tolosa | Argentina |
| 2nd place, silver medalist(s) | | Nelson Serna; Guide: Marvin Angarita | Colombia |
| 3rd place, bronze medalist(s) | | Matías Mansilla; Guide: Marcelo Mansilla | Chile |

The men's individual road race B competition of the cycling events at the 2023 Parapan American Games was held on November 19 on the Streets of Isla de Maipo, Chile.

== Schedule ==
| Date | Time | Round |
|---|---|---|
| November 26, 2023 | 08:00 | Final |

== Results ==
The results were as follows:

| Rank | Rider | Nation | Time |
|---|---|---|---|
| 1st place, gold medalist(s) | Maximiliano Gómez; Guide: Sebastián Tolosa | Argentina | 2:03.31 |
| 2nd place, silver medalist(s) | Nelson Serna; Guide: Marvin Angarita | Colombia | 2:03.36 |
| 3rd place, bronze medalist(s) | Matías Mansilla; Guide: Marcelo Mansilla | Chile | 2:06.38 |
| 4 | José Luis Martínez; Guide: Felix Martínez | Panama | -1 LAP |
| 5 | Raúl Villalba; Guide: Ezequiel Romero | Argentina | -1 LAP |
| 6 | Sheldon Francois; Guide: Felix Johnson | Grenada | -2 LAP |
