= Cycling at the 2023 Parapan American Games – Women's road race B =

Women's road race B at the 2023 Parapan American Games
- Venue: Streets of Isla de Maipo
- Dates: November 26
- Competitors: 4 from 3 nations

Medalists
1st place, gold medalist(s)		Bianca García; Guide: Nicolle Borges	Brazil
2nd place, silver medalist(s)		María Agustina Cruceño; Guide: Mayra Tocha	Argentina
3rd place, bronze medalist(s)		María José Quiroga; Guide: Micaela Barroso	Argentina

The women's individual road race B competition of the cycling events at the 2023 Parapan American Games was held on November 19 on the Streets of Isla de Maipo, Chile.

== Schedule ==
Date	Time	Round
November 26, 2023	08:00	Final

== Results ==
The results were as follows:

Rank	Rider	Nation	Time
1st place, gold medalist(s)	Bianca García; Guide: Nicolle Borges	Brazil	2:06.36
2nd place, silver medalist(s)	María Agustina Cruceño; Guide: Mayra Tocha	Argentina	2:10.49
3rd place, bronze medalist(s)	María José Quiroga; Guide: Micaela Barroso	Argentina	2:13.06
4	Hannah Chadwick-Dias; Guide: Skyler Espinoza	United States	2:23.29
