= Athletics at the 2023 Parapan American Games – Men's 200 metres T35 =

Men's 200 metres T35 at the 2023 Parapan American Games
- Venue: Mario Recordón Athletics Training Center
- Dates: November 21
- Competitors: 9 from 5 nations
- Winning time: 24.79

Medalists
1st place, gold medalist(s)		Maximiliano Villa	Argentina
2nd place, silver medalist(s)		Hernán Barreto	Argentina
3rd place, bronze medalist(s)		Fábio Bordignon	Brazil

The men's T35 200 metres competition of the athletics events at the 2023 Parapan American Games was held on November 23 at the Mario Recordón Athletics Training Center within the Julio Martínez National Stadium of Santiago, Chile.

== Records ==
Prior to this competition, the existing world and Pan American Games records were as follows:

World record	Dmitrii Safronov (RUS)	23.00	Tokyo, Japan	September 4, 2021
Parapan American Games record	Hernán Barreto (ARG)	26.45	Lima, Peru	August 24, 2019

== Schedule ==
Date	Time	Round
November 21, 2023	16:31	Semifinal
November 21, 2023	19:36	Final

== Results ==
All times shown are in seconds.

KEY:	q	Fastest non-qualifiers	Q	Qualified	PR	Parapan Games record	NR	National record	SB	Seasonal best	DQ	Disqualified

=== Semifinals ===
The fastest two athletes of each semifinal advance to the final. The results were as follows:

Rank	Heat	Name	Nationality	Time	Notes
1	2	Maximiliano Villa	Argentina	24.66	Q, SB
2	1	Hernán Barreto	Argentina	25.89	Q
3	2	Fábio Bordignon	Brazil	26.08	Q
4	2	Marshall Zackery	United States	26.63	Q, SB
5	1	Matthew Paintin	United States	27.29	Q
6	1	Austin Spalla	United States	27.85	Q, SB
7	1	Daniel Rivero	Venezuela	27.87	q
8	1	Anthony Rojas	Ecuador	28.01	q
9	2	Diego González	Argentina	32.88	

=== Final ===
The results were as follows:

Rank	Lane	Name	Nationality	Time	Notes
1st place, gold medalist(s)	6	Maximiliano Villa	Argentina	24.79	
2nd place, silver medalist(s)	4	Hernán Barreto	Argentina	25.44	
3rd place, bronze medalist(s)	5	Fábio Bordignon	Brazil	25.87	
4	7	Marshall Zackery	United States	27.00	
5	3	Matthew Paintin	United States	27.46	
6	2	Anthony Rojas	Ecuador	27.49	SB
7	8	Austin Spalla	United States	27.84	SB
8	1	Daniel Rivero	Venezuela	28.24	
