= Grenada at the 2023 Parapan American Games =

- Flag of Grenada
- IPC code: GRN
- NPC: Grenada Paralympics Committee
- Website: www.paralympic.org/grenada

in Santiago, Chile 17 November 2023 – 26 November 2023
- Competitors: 3 (3 men and 0 women) in 2 sports
- Flag bearer: Nickel Walters
- Medals: Gold 0 Silver 0 Bronze 0 Total 0

Parapan American Games appearances
- 2023

Grenada is scheduled to compete at the 2023 Parapan American Games in Santiago, Chile from 17 November to 26 November 2023. It is the first time that Grenada will participate in the Parapan American Games.

Paralympic athlete Nickel Walters was the country's flagbearer during the opening ceremony.

== Competitors ==
The following is the list of number of competitors (per gender) participating at the games per sport/discipline.

Sport	Men	Women	Total
Athletics	2	—N/a	2
Cycling	1	—N/a	1
Total	3	0	3

== Athletics ==
Men

Field events

Athlete	Event	Final	
Athlete	Event	Result	Rank
Tyler Smith	Shot put F63	7.41	5
Tyler Smith	Javelin throw F64	28.00	7
Nickel Walters	Discus throw F64	24.03	6
Nickel Walters	Javelin throw F64	28.00	6

== Cycling ==
=== Road ===
Men

Athlete	Event	Time	Rank
Sheldon Francois	Time trial B	DNS	
Sheldon Francois	Road race B	–2 LAP	6

== See also ==
- Grenada at the 2023 Pan American Games
- Grenada at the 2024 Summer Paralympics
