= Powerlifting at the 2023 Parapan American Games – Men's 97 kg =

Men's 97 kg at the 2023 Parapan American Games
- Venue: Chimkowe Gym
- Dates: November 19
- Competitors: 6 from 6 nations

Medalists
1st place, gold medalist(s)		Fabio Torres	Colombia
2nd place, silver medalist(s)		Jose Arimateia	Brazil
3rd place, bronze medalist(s)		Juan Ramírez Miramontes	Mexico

The men's 97 kg competition of the powerlifting events at the 2023 Parapan American Games was held on November 19 at the Chimkowe Gym in Santiago, Chile.

== Records ==
Prior to this competition, the existing world and Pan American Games records were as follows:

World record	Abdelkareem Khattab (JOR)	255 kg	Dubai, United Arab Emirates	December 17, 2022
Parapan American Games record	Jose Castillo Castillo (MEX)	225 kg	Toronto, Canada	August 11, 2015
Americas record	Fabio Torres (COL)	230 kg	St. Louis, United States	July 10, 2022

== Results ==
The results were as follows:

Rank	Name	Body weight (kg)	Attempts (kg)				Result (kg)
Rank	Name	Body weight (kg)	1	2	3	4	Result (kg)
1st place, gold medalist(s)	Fabio Torres (COL)	94.5	205	208	215		215
2nd place, silver medalist(s)	Jose Arimateia (BRA)	96.9	200	~~206~~	~~213~~		200
3rd place, bronze medalist(s)	Juan Ramírez Miramontes (MEX)	88.6	~~152~~	153	158		158
4	Nahuel Gómez (ARG)	93.1	152	156	157		157
5	Steven Cruz Mendes (ECU)	94.2	140	145	~~148~~		145
6	Marcos Matamala (CHI)	91.6	~~150~~	~~155~~	~~158~~		-
