= Cycling at the 2023 Parapan American Games – Men's road time trial B =

Men's road time trial B at the 2023 Parapan American Games
- Venue: Streets of Isla de Maipo
- Dates: November 19
- Competitors: 6 from 5 nations
- Winning time: 28:27.53

Medalists
1st place, gold medalist(s)		Maximiliano Gómez; Guide: Sebastián Tolosa	Argentina
2nd place, silver medalist(s)		Nelson Serna; Guide: Marvin Angarita	Colombia
3rd place, bronze medalist(s)		Matías Mansilla; Guide: Marcelo Mansilla	Chile

The men's individual road time trial B competition of the cycling events at the 2023 Parapan American Games was held on November 19 on the Streets of Isla de Maipo, Chile.

== Schedule ==
Date	Time	Round
November 19, 2023	08:00	Final

== Results ==
The results were as follows:

Rank	Rider	Nation	Time
1st place, gold medalist(s)	Maximiliano Gómez; Guide: Sebastián Tolosa	Argentina	28:27.53
2nd place, silver medalist(s)	Nelson Serna; Guide: Marvin Angarita	Colombia	28:46.36
3rd place, bronze medalist(s)	Matías Mansilla; Guide: Marcelo Mansilla	Chile	30:57.85
4	Raúl Villalba; Guide: Ezequiel Romero	Argentina	31:06.59
5	José Luis Martínez; Guide: Felix Martínez	Panama	33:35.62
	Sheldon Francois; Guide: Felix Johnson	Grenada	DNS
