= Athletics at the 2020 Summer Paralympics – Men's 100 metres T36 =

Men's 100 metres T36 at the XVI Paralympic Games
- Venue: Tokyo National Stadium
- Dates: 3 September 2021 (heats); 4 September 2021 (final)
- Competitors: 14 from 10 nations
- Winning time: 11.85

Medalists
1st place, gold medalist(s)		Deng Peicheng	China
2nd place, silver medalist(s)		James Turner	Australia
3rd place, bronze medalist(s)		Alexis Sebastian Chavez	Argentina

Men's 100 metres
T11 · T12 · T13 · T33 · T34 · T35 · T36 · T37 · T38 · T47 · T51 · T52 · T53 · T54 · T63 · T64

The men's 100 metres T36 event at the 2020 Summer Paralympics in Tokyo, took place between 3 and 4 September 2021.

The T36 category is for ambulant athletes with cerebral palsy. These athletes do not have the capacity to remain still and they show involuntary movements with all four limbs affected. They usually walk without assistive devices.

== Records ==
Prior to the competition, the existing records were as follows:

World Record	James Turner (AUS)	11.72	Dubai, United Arab Emirates	10 November 2019
Paralympic Record	Mohamad Ridzuan Mohamad Puzi (MAS)	12.07	Rio de Janeiro, Brazil	10 September 2016

Area	Time	Athlete	Nation
Africa	12.78	Hossameldin Abdelkader	Egypt
America	11.91	Alexis Sebastian Chavez	Argentina
Asia	11.79	Yang Yifei	China
Europe	11.90	Evgenii Shvetcov	Russia
Oceania	11.72 WR	James Turner	Australia

== Results ==
=== Heats ===
Heat 1 took place on 3 September, at 20:27:

Rank	Lane	Name	Nationality	Time	Notes
1	3	James Turner	Australia	11.87	Q, PR
2	7	Deng Peicheng	China	11.88	Q, PB
3	6	Alexis Sebastian Chavez	Argentina	11.91	Q, AR
4	2	Aser Mateus Almeida Ramos	Brazil	12.25	q, SB
5	8	Evgenii Torsunov	RPC	12.51	q, SB
6	4	Roman Pavlyk	Ukraine	12.58	SB
7	5	Krzysztof Ciuksza	Poland	12.84	

Heat 2 took place on 3 September, at 20:33:

Rank	Lane	Name	Nationality	Time	Notes
1	5	Mohamad Ridzuan Mohamad Puzi	Malaysia	12.06	Q, SB
2	3	Yang Yifei	China	12.10	Q, SB
3	4	Evgenii Shvetcov	RPC	12.26	Q, =SB
4	2	Takeru Matsumoto	Japan	12.61	PB
5	8	Taha Al Harrasi	Oman	12.80	
6	7	Oleksandr Lytvynenko	Ukraine	13.01	
7	6	Rodrigo Parreira da Silva	Brazil	1:18.00	SB

=== Final ===
The final took place on 4 September, at 10:38:

Rank	Lane	Name	Nationality	Time	Notes
1st place, gold medalist(s)	7	Deng Peicheng	China	11.85	PR
2nd place, silver medalist(s)	6	James Turner	Australia	12.00	
3rd place, bronze medalist(s)	4	Alexis Sebastian Chavez	Argentina	12.02	
4	5	Mohamad Ridzuan Mohamad Puzi	Malaysia	12.15	
5	9	Yang Yifei	China	12.18	
6	8	Aser Mateus Almeida Ramos	Brazil	12.32	
7	2	Evgenii Torsunov	RPC	12.49	SB
8	3	Evgenii Shvetcov	RPC	12.51	
