= Athletics at the 2023 Parapan American Games – Men's 100 metres T35 =

Men's 100 metres T35 at the 2023 Parapan American Games
- Venue: Mario Recordón Athletics Training Center
- Dates: November 23
- Competitors: 9 from 5 nations
- Winning time: 12.10

Medalists
1st place, gold medalist(s)		Hernán Barreto	Argentina
2nd place, silver medalist(s)		Maximiliano Villa	Argentina
3rd place, bronze medalist(s)		Fábio Bordignon	Brazil

The men's T35 100 metres competition of the athletics events at the 2023 Parapan American Games was held on November 23 at the Mario Recordón Athletics Training Center within the Julio Martínez National Stadium of Santiago, Chile.

== Records ==
Prior to this competition, the existing world and Pan American Games records were as follows:

World record	Dmitrii Safronov (RUS)	11.39	Tokyo, Japan	August 30, 2021
Parapan American Games record	Fábio Bordignon (BRA)	12.72	Lima, Peru	August 27, 2019
Americas record	Fábio Bordignon (BRA)	12.32	São Paulo, Brazil	April 2, 2022

== Schedule ==
Date	Time	Round
November 23, 2023	15:54	Semifinal
November 23, 2023	18:33	Final

== Results ==
All times shown are in seconds.

KEY:	q	Fastest non-qualifiers	Q	Qualified	PR	Parapan Games record	NR	National record	SB	Seasonal best	DQ	Disqualified

=== Semifinals ===
The fastest two athletes of each semifinal advance to the final. The results were as follows:

Rank	Heat	Name	Nationality	Time	Notes
1	2	Hernán Barreto	Argentina	12.24	Q
2	2	Maximiliano Villa	Argentina	12.29	Q
3	1	Fábio Bordignon	Brazil	12.43	Q
4	2	Marshall Zackery	United States	12.96	Q
5	1	Diego González	Argentina	12.99	Q
6	1	Matthew Paintin	United States	13.35	Q
7	1	Austin Spalla	United States	13.39	q, SB
8	2	Anthony Rojas	Ecuador	13.52	q
9	1	Daniel Rivero	Venezuela	13.80	

=== Final ===
The results were as follows:

Rank	Lane	Name	Nationality	Time	Notes
1st place, gold medalist(s)	3	Hernán Barreto	Argentina	12.10	PR
2nd place, silver medalist(s)	6	Maximiliano Villa	Argentina	12.19	SB
3rd place, bronze medalist(s)	5	Fábio Bordignon	Brazil	12.29	SB
4	7	Marshall Zackery	United States	12.81	SB
5	4	Diego González	Argentina	12.84	SB
6	1	Austin Spalla	United States	13.32	SB
7	8	Matthew Paintin	United States	13.44	
8	2	Anthony Rojas	Ecuador	13.53	
