= Emanuel Martinez =

Muralist, sculptor, and activist

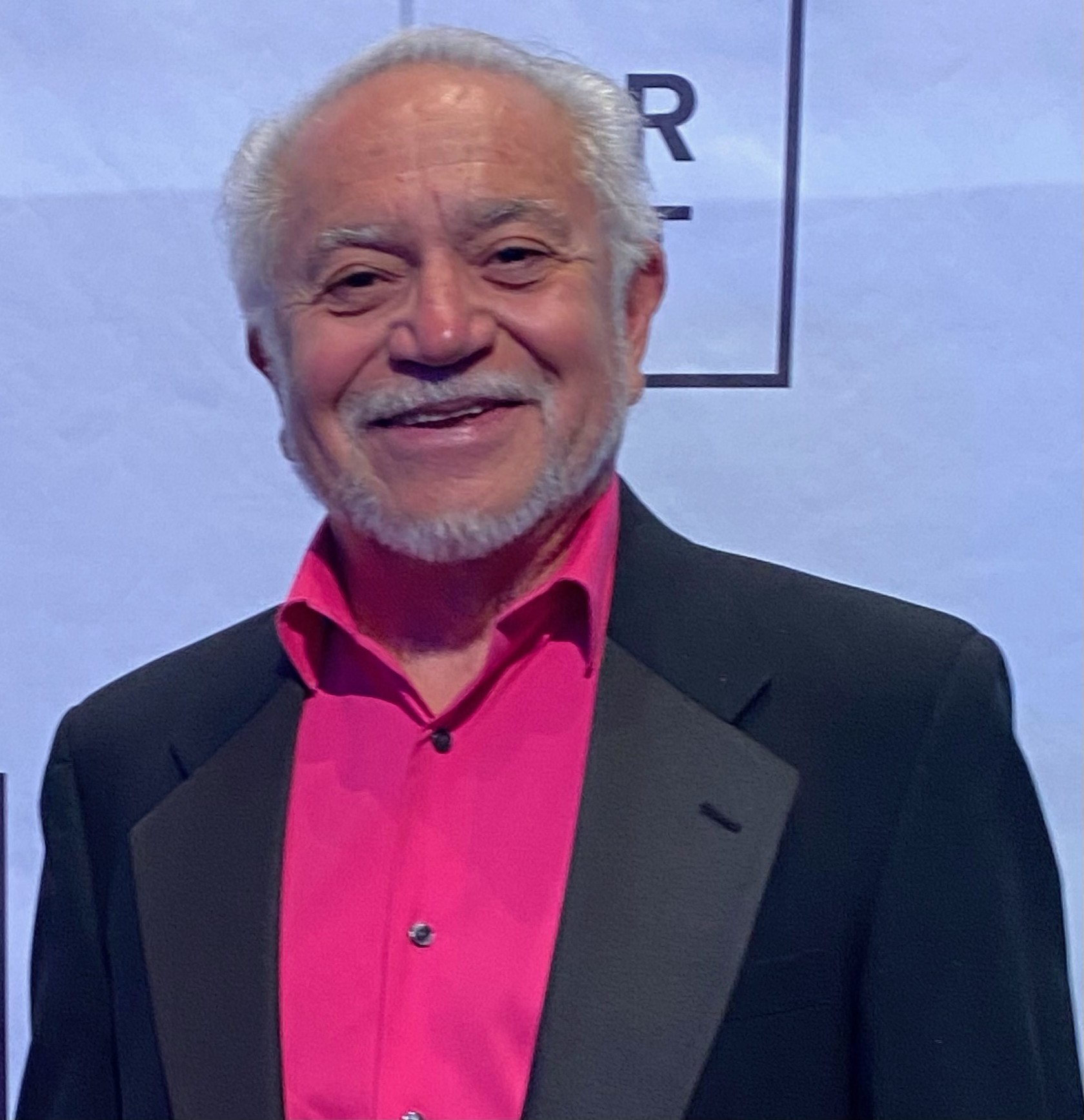
- Born: 1947 (age 78–79)
- Education: Metropolitan State University of Denver
- Awards: Colorado Latino Hall of Fame Award and Governors Award for Excellence in the Arts
- Website: https://emanuelmartinez.com/

Emanuel Martinez is an artist and activist born in Denver, Colorado. He was a juvenile delinquent, and a prison cell was where his art practice began. Following incarceration, Martinez apprenticed to the artist Bill Longley who guided him to a path of art and activism. Martinez has created murals, sculptures, and paintings that contribute to the greater body of Chicano art, especially Chicano murals, as well as socio-political art created directly for protests or movements.

== Education ==
In addition to apprenticing with Bill Longley, Martinez studied with the artist Francisco Zúñiga and the Mexican social realist painter and muralist, David Siqueiros.

== Select works ==
=== Murals in Colorado ===
At the age of 13, while in juvenile detention, Martinez created his first mural. In 1968, he began painting his first public mural, which sparked the community mural movement in Colorado. Later, he established a youth art program that involved painting murals for Denver Parks and Recreation. His murals are influenced by the principles of Mexican muralism to instill pride by reflecting the community's culture and history. Within the murals this can be recognized in elements like symmetry, complementary elements, and color.

Along with Denver's growth leading into the 2020s, worries about gentrification have grown, especially the potential to affect historic parts of the city like Martinez's murals. In 2021, La Alma Lincoln Park was designated a historic cultural district, yet this does not necessarily protect the artwork completely as it is still subjected to the owners of the buildings the works are painted on.

==== Arte Mestiza ====
The Arte Mestiza mural was created in 1986 and is in the parking lot of the Colorado Springs Fine Arts Center. The mural depicts the artistic and cultural contributions of Indigenous, Mexican, Mexican American, and Spanish people.

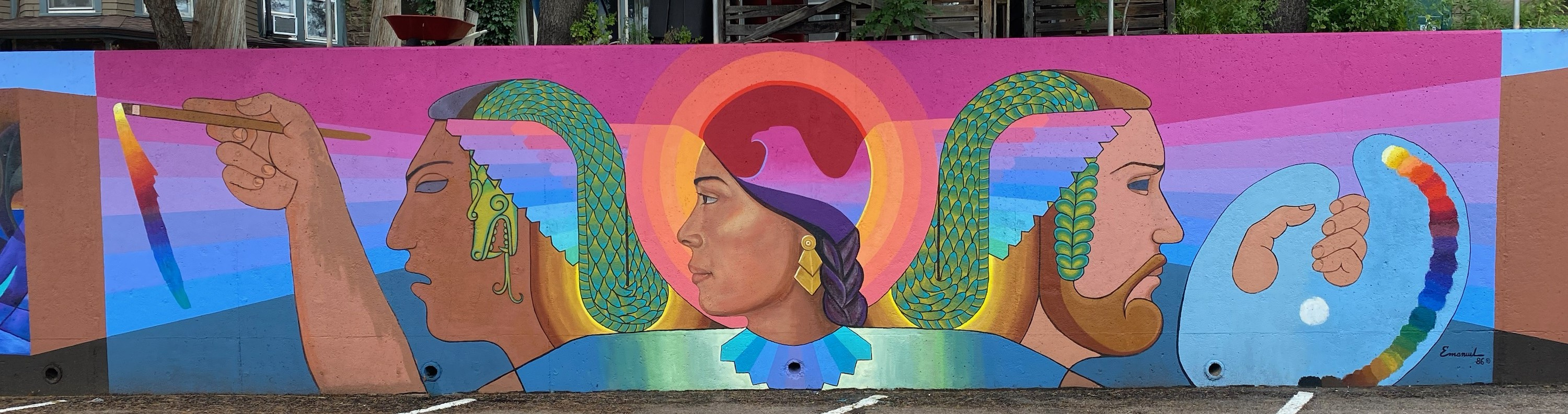
Arte Mestiza

==== La Alma ====
The La Alma mural was painted in 1978 on the La Alma Recreation Center. It is representative of the culture in the community of the area, with its title La Alma ('The Soul'), and was made by Martinez in response to activism and the need for cultural representation in the neighborhood.

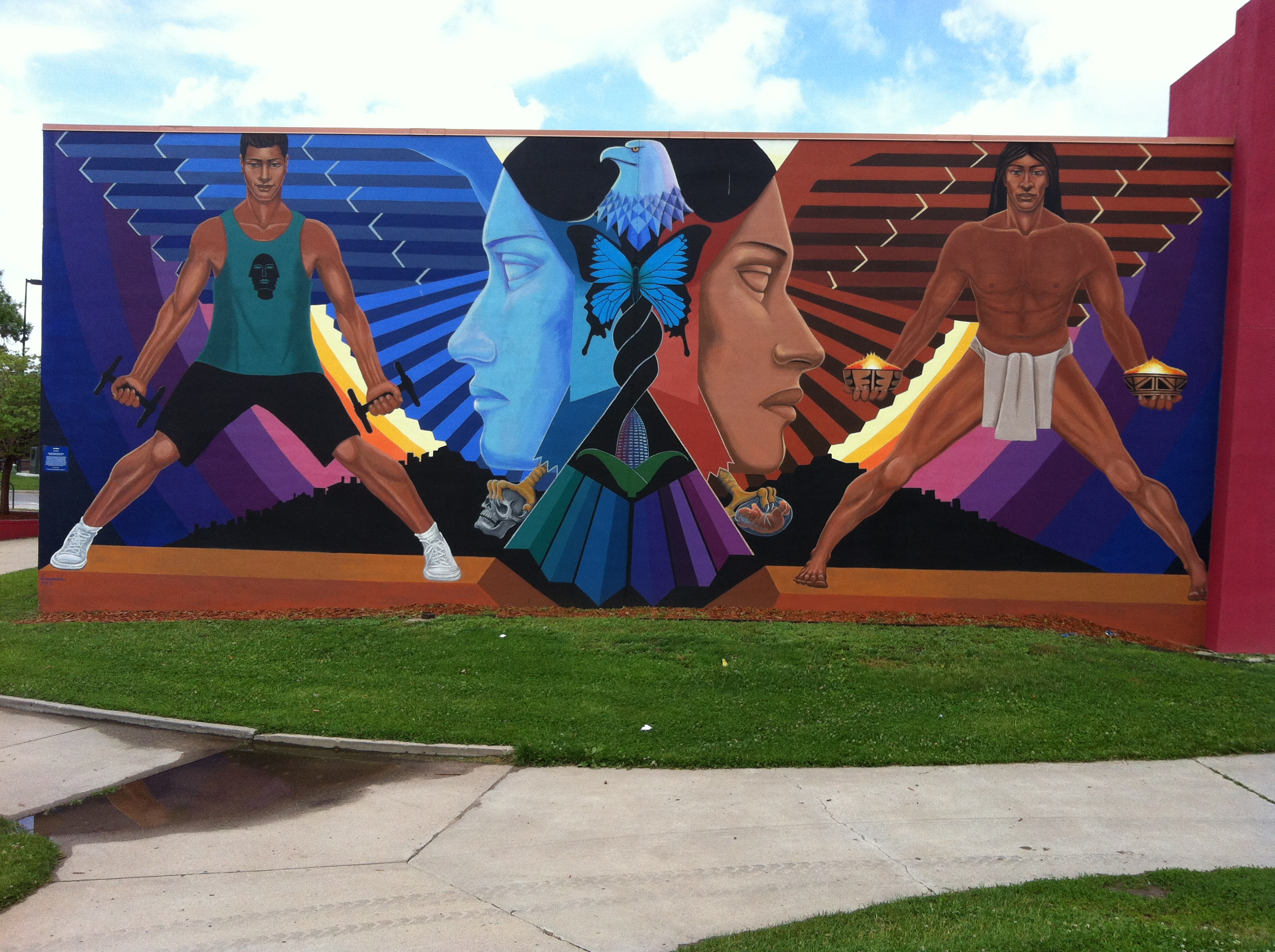
La Alma

==== Confluent People ====
The Confluent People mural was created in 1999 at Little Raven St. and Speer Blvd. The painting illustrates the confluence of two rivers and the contemporary and historical people and animals who lived in this area.

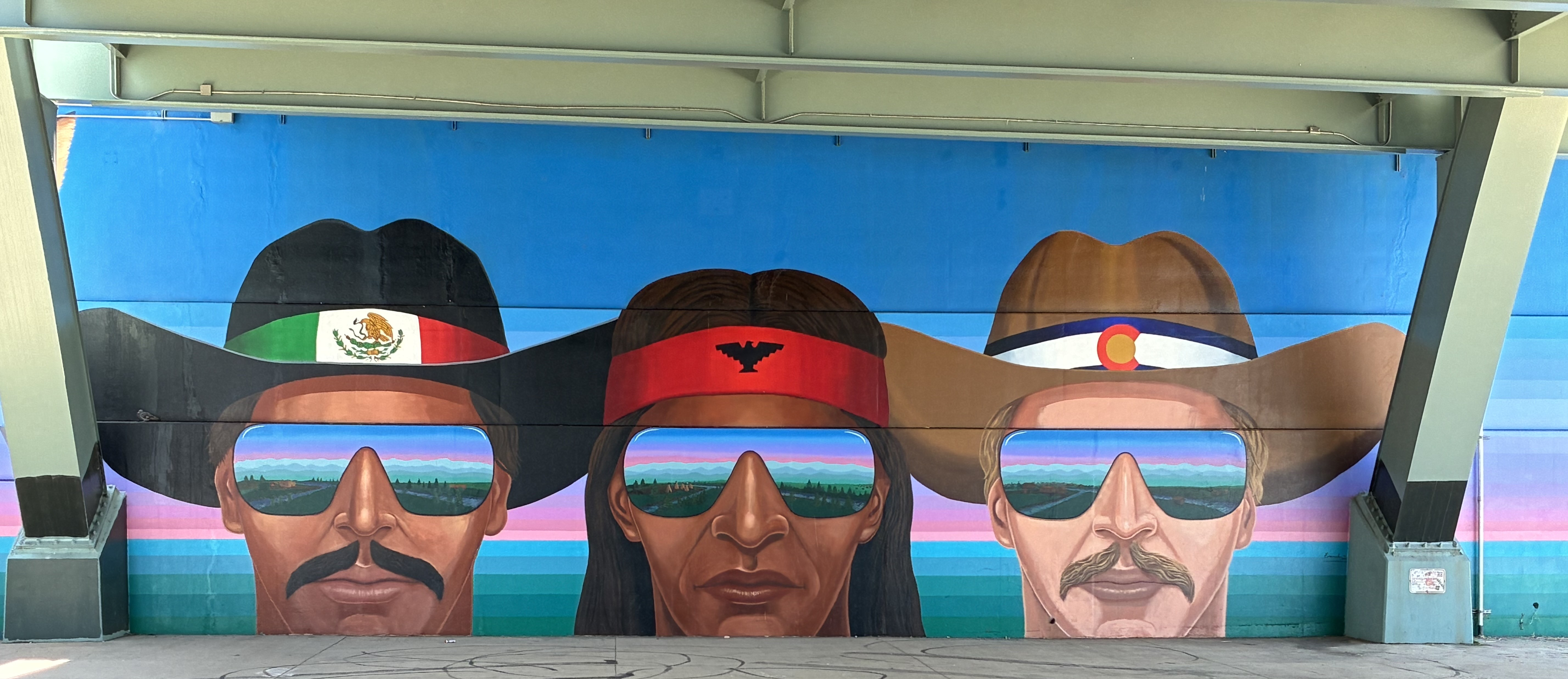
Confluent People

== Activism ==
Martinez's activism began with involvement in the Chicano Movement; more specifically, within the United Farmworkers, the Crusade for Justice, and Alianza Federal de Mercedes. He created artwork for events and protests, like murals and posters. In 1966, he worked with Cesar Chavez in California creating artwork connected to the farm workers' struggle there. One of his most significant works from the Civil Rights Movement is the Farm Workers' Altar, created for an event and mass held to commemorate when Cesar Chavez ended a fast protesting the injustices faced by migrant laborers.

== The Emanuel Project ==
The Emanuel Project is a non-profit organization founded by a past student of Martinez, Louisa Craft-Jornayvaz, who named the organization for him. The organization had been inspired by the past muralist movement in Colorado, and currently focuses on creation, restoration, and youth involvement. Within the state, it has worked on a project restoring old Chicano/a/x murals in the Denver area. Beyond the local community, it has worked with those in juvenile detention centers to create new murals, a program titled Murals of Hope.

== Awards and legacy ==
Martinez was awarded the Denver Mayor's Award for Excellence in the Arts. A collection of Martinez' papers from 1951–2019 are held the Archives of American Art. An additional archive of material on his work is held in the Emanuel Martinez Papers collection at the Denver Public Library.

== Collections ==
Martinez' work is held in the permanent collections of the Smithsonian American Art Museum and the Museo de las Americas in Denver.
