= Maximiliano Espinillo =

Argentine blind footballer (born 1993)

Personal information
- Born: 16 November 1993 (age 32) Córdoba Province, Argentina

Sport
- Sport: 5-a-side football
Medal record
Representing Argentina
Paralympic Games
Silver medal – second place	2020 Tokyo	Men's tournament
Silver medal – second place	2024 Paris	Men's tournament
Bronze medal – third place	2016 Rio de Janeiro	Men's tournament
World Blind Football Championships
Gold medal – first place	2023 Birmingham	Men's tournament
Parapan American Games
Silver medal – second place	2015 Toronto	Men's tournament
Silver medal – second place	2019 Lima	Men's tournament
Bronze medal – third place	2023 Santiago	Men's tournament

Maximiliano Walter "Maxi" Espinillo, nicknamed Max Power (born 16 November 1993) is an Argentine blind footballer who plays for the Los Murcielagos and formerly for Los Buhos as a striker.
