= Elías Romero (footballer, born 1996) =

Venezuelan footballer (born 1996)

Personal information
- Full name: Elías Enrique Romero Barrios
- Date of birth: 12 July 1996 (age 30)
- Place of birth: Caracas, Venezuela
- Height: 1.73 m (5 ft 8 in)
- Position: Defensive midfielder

Team information
- Current team: UD Torre del Mar

Youth career
- Real Esppor
- Atlético Venezuela

Senior career*
Years	Team	Apps	(Gls)
2015	Doxa Katokopias	3	(0)
2016–2017	Deportivo La Guaira	1	(0)
2018–2019	Puerto Cabello	3	(0)
2019	Deportivo Miranda		
2020–2022	Universidad Central	45	(4)
2023–2025	Deportivo La Guaira	47	(0)
2025–2026	Haka	8	(0)
2026–	UD Torre del Mar	0	(0)
- * Club domestic league appearances and goals as of 19 November 2025

Elías Enrique Romero Barrios (born 12 July 1996) is a Venezuelan professional footballer who plays as a defensive midfielder for UD Torre del Mar.

== Club career ==
Romero started his senior career with Doxa Katokopias in Cyprus in 2015. He returned to Venezuela after the season and signed with Venezuelan Primera División club Deportivo La Guaira.

Romero played in his native Venezuela for Puerto Cabello, Deportivo Miranda, Universidad Central and Deportivo La Guaira. On 18 February 2025, Veikkausliiga club Haka in Finland announced the signing of Romero for the 2025 season.

== Career statistics ==
As of 16 May 2025

Appearances and goals by club, season and competition
Club	Season	League			Cup (Note: Includes Cypriot Cup and Copa Venezuela)		Other		Total	
Club	Season	Division	Apps	Goals	Apps	Goals	Apps	Goals	Apps	Goals
Doxa Katokopias	2014–15	Cypriot First Division	3	0	2	0	–		5	0
Deportivo La Guaira	2016	Venezuelan Primera División	1	0	–		–		1	0
Puerto Cabello	2018	Venezuelan Primera División	2	0	–		–		2	0
Deportivo Miranda	2019	Venezuelan Segunda División			–		–			
Universidad Central	2020	Venezuelan Segunda División	3	3	–		–		3	3
Universidad Central	2021	Venezuelan Primera División	19	1	–		–		19	1
Universidad Central	2022	Venezuelan Primera División	23	0	–		–		23	0
Universidad Central	Total		45	4	0	0	0	0	45	4
Deportivo La Guaira	2023	Venezuelan Primera División	25	0	–		–		25	0
Deportivo La Guaira	2024	Venezuelan Primera División	21	0	3	0	0	0	24	0
Deportivo La Guaira	2025	Venezuelan Primera División	1	0	–		–		1	0
Deportivo La Guaira	Total		47	0	3	0	0	0	50	0
Haka	2025	Veikkausliiga	4	0	1	0	2 (Note: Appearances in Finnish League Cup)	0	7	0
Career total			102	4	6	0	2	0	110	4
