= Paula Gómez =

Argentine Paralympic judoka

Personal information
- Full name: Paula Karina Gómez Martinez
- Born: 31 January 1985 (age 41) Merlo, Buenos Aires, Argentina
- Occupation: Judoka

Sport
- Country: Argentina
- Sport: Para judo
- Weight class: ‍–‍57 kg

Achievements and titles
- Paralympic Games: (bronze) (2024)
Medal record
Women's para judo
Representing Argentina
Paralympic Games
Bronze medal – third place	2024 Paris	‍–‍57 kg
Parapan American Games
Silver medal – second place	2015 Toronto	‍–‍57 kg
Bronze medal – third place	2019 Lima	‍–‍57 kg
Bronze medal – third place	2023 Santiago	‍–‍57 kg
Parapan American Championships
Gold medal – first place	2018 Calgary	‍–‍57 kg
Bronze medal – third place	2022 Edmonton	‍–‍57 kg

Profile at external databases
- JudoInside.com: 99665

Paula Karina Gómez Martinez (born 31 January 1985) is an Argentine Paralympic judoka who competes in international judo competitions. She is a Pan American champion and a three-time Parapan American Games medalist. She also represented Argentina at the 2016 Summer Paralympics.
