= Hannah Chadwick =

American Paralympic cyclist

Personal information
- Born: January 24, 1992 (age 34) China

Sport
- Country: United States
- Sport: Cycling
Medal record
Women's para-cycling
Representing the United States
Track World Championships
Bronze medal – third place	2023 Glasgow	Tandem sprint B
Bronze medal – third place	2024 Rio de Janeiro	Team sprint B
Parapan American Games
Gold medal – first place	2023 Santiago	Pursuit B
Gold medal – first place	2023 Santiago	Time trial B

Hannah Chadwick (born January 24, 1992) is an American cyclist who competes in para-cycling tandem track events as a visually impaired athlete.

== Early life ==
Chadwick was born in China and spent her early childhood with an adoptive family on a farm, before being sent to an orphanage so she could receive an education. She has been blind since birth. She moved to Arcata, California when she was adopted by Patricia Chadwick and Stephen Dias at age 12, eventually attending college at University of California, Davis where she received a bachelor's degree in international relations and Mandarin Chinese.

== Career ==
Chadwick relocated to the United States Olympic Training Center in Colorado Springs, Colorado to live and train together in the same place as her pilot Mary-Kate Wintz. Chadwick and Wintz trained together since 2019. She made her UCI Para-cycling Track World Championships debut in 2022, where she finished in fifth place in the tandem B team sprint.

In July 2023, she was named to Team USA's Track World Championships roster for the 2023 UCI Para-cycling Track World Championships. During the championships she won a bronze medal in the tandem sprint B event with her pilot Skyler Espinoza, defeating their Italian opponents by .033 seconds. This was the first and only sprint race they had competed together in as a tandem. Later that year she competed at the 2023 Parapan American Games and won two gold medals. On the first day of the competition, she won gold in the 3,000-meter individual pursuit race with a time of 3:45.752. On the next day, she won gold in the 1,000-meter time trial with a Parapan American Games record time of 1:12.265. She also competed in the women's road race B and finished in fourth place with a time of 2:23.29.

In February 2024, she was named to Team USA's Track World Championships roster for the 2024 UCI Para-cycling Track World Championships. During the championships she won a bronze medal in the team sprint B event. This was the United States' first medal of the championships.
