= Maria Liana Mutia =

American Paralympic judoka

Personal information
- Born: 16 October 1998 (age 28) Philippines
- Education: Colorado State University

Sport
- Country: United States
- Sport: Para judo
- Disability class: J1
- Club: El Idrissi Judo Academy
Medal record
Para judo
Representing United States
Paralympic Games
Silver medal – second place	2024 Paris	U57kg
Parapan American Games
Silver medal – second place	2023 Santiago	U63kg
World Championships
Bronze medal – third place	2022 Baku	U63kg
Bronze medal – third place	2023 Birmingham	U57kg
Pan American Championships
Gold medal – first place	2020 Montreal	U63kg
Gold medal – first place	2022 Edmonton	U57kg

Maria Liana Mutia (born 16 October 1998) is an American Paralympic judoka. She is a two-time Pan American champion, Parapan American Games silver medalist and a two-time World bronze medalist. She competed in the 2020 Summer Paralympics in Tokyo. In 2024 Summer Paralympics Mutia won Silver in the Women's U57kg J1 category.

Mutia lives and works in Philadelphia as a software analyst.
