= Alexis Chávez =

Argentine Paralympic athlete

Alexis Sebastian Chavez
Personal information
- Born: 18 July 2002 (age 24) Pergamino, Argentina

Sport
- Sport: Paralympic athletics
- Disability: Cerebral palsy
- Disability class: T36
- Event: Sprints
- Club: Escuela Municipal de Deporte Adaptado
- Coached by: Andrés Buey
Medal record
Paralympic athletics
Representing Argentina
Paralympic Games
Silver medal – second place	2024 Paris	100 m T36
Bronze medal – third place	2020 Tokyo	100 m T36
Bronze medal – third place	2024 Paris	400 m T36
World Championships
Bronze medal – third place	2023 Paris	100 m T36
Bronze medal – third place	2023 Paris	400 m T36
Parapan American Games
Gold medal – first place	2019 Lima	100 m T36
Gold medal – first place	2019 Lima	400 m T36
Gold medal – first place	2023 Santiago	400 m T36

Alexis Sebastian Chavez (born 18 July 2002) is an Argentine Paralympic athlete specializing in sprints. He represented Argentina at the 2020 Summer Paralympics.

== Career ==
Chavez represented Argentina at the 2020 Summer Paralympics in the 100 metres T36 event and won a bronze medal.
