= Wheelchair tennis at the 2015 Parapan American Games – Men's singles =

Men's singles
- Wheelchair tennis at the 2015 Parapan American Games

Final
- Champion: Gustavo Fernandez (ARG)
- Runner-up: Jon Rynberg (USA)
- Score: 6–1, 6–2

Events
Singles	men	women
Doubles	men	women
← 2011 ·	Parapan American Games	· 2019 →

The men's singles wheelchair tennis tournament at the 2015 Parapan American Games took place from August 8 to 14, 2015 at the University of Toronto Scarborough Tennis Centre in Toronto, Canada. 24 athletes from 13 countries competed in this event.

Argentina's Gustavo Fernández successfully defended his gold medal from 2011 Guadalajara.

== Main draw ==
=== Key ===
- Q = Qualifier
- WC = Wild card
- LL = Lucky loser
- Alt = Alternate
- ITF = ITF entry
- PR = Protected ranking
- SR = Special ranking
- SE = Special exempt
- JE = Junior exempt
- JR = Junior Accelerator Programme entrant
- CO = College Accelerator Programme entrant
- NG = Next Gen Accelerator Program entrant
- w/o = Walkover
- r = Retired
- d = Defaulted

=== Finals ===
Semifinals
Gustavo Fernandez (ARG)	6	6
Eliecer Oquendo (COL)	1	0
Jon Rynberg (USA)	6	6
Daniel Rodrigues (BRA)	3	4

Final (gold medal match)
Gustavo Fernandez (ARG)	6	6
Jon Rynberg (USA)	1	2
Bronze medal match
Eliecer Oquendo (COL)	0	1
Daniel Rodrigues (BRA)	6	6

=== Top half ===
First round
Francisco Cayulef (CHI)	6	6
Ysabelino Apaza (PER)	2	2
Mauricio Vega (COL)	6	6
Carlos Muro (MEX)	1	3
Eliecer Oquendo (COL)	6	6
Oscar Marrero (PUR)	2	1
Pedro Perez (ESA)	6	7
Macario Ramas (GUA)	1	5

Second round
1	Gustavo Fernandez (ARG)	6	6
Francisco Cayulef (CHI)	1	1
Mauricio Vega (COL)	3	1
5	Joel Dembe (CAN)	6	6
3	Carlos Santos (BRA)	0	6	1
Eliecer Oquendo (COL)	6	4	6
Pedro Perez (ESA)	0	0
7	Ezequiel Casco (ARG)	6	6

Quarterfinals
Gustavo Fernandez (ARG)	6	6
Joel Dembe (CAN)	1	1
Eliecer Oquendo (COL)	6	3	7
Ezequiel Casco (ARG)	1	6	5

Semifinals
Gustavo Fernandez (ARG)	6	6
Eliecer Oquendo (COL)	1	0

=== Bottom half ===
First round
Robinson Mendez (CHI)	1	4
Raul Ortega (MEX)	6	6
Alexei Perez (CUB)	6	6
Miguel Lozada (MEX)	1	1
Andres De la Cruz (CUB)	1	0
Efrain Cabrera (PUR)	6	6
Federico Huezo (ESA)	6	6
Oscar Oliva (GUA)	4	3

Second round
6	Philippe Bedard (CAN)	6	6
Robinson Mendez (CHI)	0	1
Alexei Perez (CUB)	0	0
4	Jon Rydberg (USA)	6	6
8	Steve Baldwin (USA)	6	6	1
Efrain Cabrera (ECU)	0	1
Federico Huezo (ESA)	0	1
2	Daniel Rodrigues (BRA)	6	6

Quarterfinals
Robinson Mendez (CHI)	1	4
Jon Rydberg (USA)	6	6
Steve Baldwin (USA)	0	1
Daniel Rodrigues (BRA)	6	6

Semifinals
Jon Rydberg (USA)	6	6
Daniel Rodrigues (BRA)	3	4
