= Athletics at the 2015 Parapan American Games – Men's 200 metres T36 =

Athletics – Men's 200 metres T36 at the 2015 Parapan American Games
- Venue: CIBC Athletics Stadium
- Dates: August 13
- Competitors: 7 from 5 nations

Medalists
1st place, gold medalist(s)		Juan Moreno Marquez	Colombia
2nd place, silver medalist(s)		Enrique Rotondo	Argentina
3rd place, bronze medalist(s)		Gabriel de Jesus Cuadra Holmann	Nicaragua

The men's T36 200 metres competition of the athletics events at the 2015 Parapan American Games was held on August 13 at the CIBC Athletics Stadium. The defending Parapan American Games champion was José Florez of Colombia.

== Records ==
Prior to this competition, the existing records were as follows:

World record	Evgenii Shvetcov (RUS)	24.45	London, United Kingdom	21 June 2015
Americas record	Rodrigo Parreira da Silva (BRA)	25.53	São Paulo, Brazil	24 April 2015
Parapan Am Record	Jose Florez (COL)	26.89	Guadalajara, Mexico	17 November 2011

=== Records broken ===
Parapan Am Record	Juan Moreno Marquez (COL)	25.80	Toronto, Canada	13 August 2015

== Schedule ==
All times are Central Standard Time (UTC-6).

Date	Time	Round
13 August	16:45	Final

== Results ==
All times are shown in seconds.

KEY:	q	Fastest non-qualifiers	Q	Qualified	PR	Parapan American Games record	AR	Area record	NR	National record	PB	Personal best	SB	Seasonal best	DSQ	Disqualified	FS	False start

=== Final ===
Wind: -1.4 m/s

Rank	Name	Nation	Time	Notes
1st place, gold medalist(s)	Juan Moreno Marquez	Colombia	25.80	PR
2nd place, silver medalist(s)	Alice de Oliveira Correa	Argentina	26.99	
3rd place, bronze medalist(s)	Greilyz Villaroel	Nicaragua	27.43	
4	Daineris Mijans	Colombia	28.08	
5	Alexis Alvarez	Argentina	28.31	
6	Yonathan Martinez Luna	Mexico	29.68	
	Rodrigo Parreira da Silva	Brazil	DNF	
