= Argentina at the 2015 Parapan American Games =

- IOC code: ARG
- NOC: Comité Paralímpico Argentino
- Website: coparg.org.ar

in Toronto 7–15 August 2015
- Competitors: 177 in 14 sports
- Medals Ranked 7th: Gold 18 Silver 24 Bronze 23 Total 65

Parapan American Games appearances
- 1999; 2003; 2007; 2011; 2015; 2019; 2023

Argentina participated in the 2015 Parapan American Games.

== Competitors ==
The following table lists Argentina's delegation per sport and gender.

Sport	Men	Women	Total
Archery	1	0	1
Athletics	22	11	33
Boccia	7	3	10
Cycling	9	3	12
Football 5-a-side	10	0	10
Football 7-a-side	14	0	14
Goalball	6	0	6
Judo	5	3	8
Powerlifting	3	1	4
Swimming	18	7	25
Table tennis	12	4	16
Wheelchair basketball	12	12	24
Wheelchair rugby	12	0	12
Wheelchair tennis	2	0	2
Total	133	44	177

== Medalists ==
Medal	Name	Sport	Event	Date
Gold	Facundo Arregui	Swimming	Men's 400m Freestyle S7	August 8
Gold	Pipo Carlomagno	Swimming	Men's 100m Backstroke S8	August 8
Gold	Sergio Zayas	Swimming	Men's 100m Backstroke S11	August 9
Gold	Daniela Gimenez	Swimming	Women's 100m Breaststroke SB9	August 9
Gold	Hernan Barreto	Athletics	Men's 100m T35	August 10
Gold	Mariela Delgado	Cycling	Women's 500m Time Trial C1-5	August 10
Gold	Anabel Moro	Swimming	Women's 100m Breaststroke SB13	August 10
Gold	Daniela Gimenez	Swimming	Women's 50m Freestyle S9	August 10
Gold	Yanina Martinez	Athletics	Women's 200m T36	August 11
Gold	Mariela Delgado	Cycling	Women's Individual Pursuit C1-5	August 11
Gold	Facundo Lazo	Swimming	Men's 100m Breaststroke SB8	August 11
Gold	Lis Scaroni	Athletics	Women's 200m T37	August 12
Gold	Elian Araya	Swimming	Men's 100m Breaststroke SB14	August 12
Gold	Anabel Moro	Swimming	Women's 100m Freestyle S12	August 13
Gold	Gustavo Fernandez; Ezequiel Casco	Wheelchair Tennis	Men's doubles	August 13
Gold	Gustavo Fernandez	Wheelchair Tennis	Men's Singles	August 14
Gold	Jorge Lencina	Judo	Men's 90 kg	August 14
Gold	Yanina Martinez	Athletics	Women's 100m T36	August 14
Silver	Mauricio Ibarbure; Roberto Leglise; Jonatan Aquino; Sebastian Gonzalez	Boccia	Team BC1/BC2	August 8
Silver	Mariela Delgado	Cycling	Women's Road Race C1-5	August 8
Silver	Ariel Quassi	Swimming	Men's 100m Breaststroke SB4	August 9
Silver	Ana Pellitero	Swimming	Women's 100m Backstroke S13	August 9
Silver	Enrique Rotondo	Athletics	Men's 100m T36	August 10
Silver	Daniel Tataren	Athletics	Men's Long Jump T37	August 10
Silver	Leandro Ricci	Athletics	Men's Discus Throw F37	August 10
Silver	Sergio Paz	Athletics	Men's Discus Throw F11	August 10
Silver	Ariel Quassi	Swimming	Men's 100m Butterfly S9	August 10
Silver	Mauro Depergola	Table Tennis	Men's Singles C5	August 10
Silver	Giselle Munoz	Table Tennis	Women's Singles C6-7	August 10
Silver	Eduardo Gauto	Judo	Men's 60 kg	August 12
Silver	Anabel Moro	Swimming	Women's 100m Freestyle SB12	August 11
Silver	Pipo Carlomagno	Swimming	Men's 100m Breaststroke SB7	August 12
Silver	Carlos Duarte; Fernando Eberhardt	Table Tennis	Men's Team C1-2	August 12
Silver	Gabriel Copola; Mauro Depergola; Daniel Rodriguez	Table Tennis	Men's Team C5	August 12
Silver	Enrique Rotondo	Athletics	Men's 200m T36	August 13
Silver	Leandro Ricci	Athletics	Men's Shot Put F37	August 13
Silver	Jose Effron	Judo	Men's 81 kg	August 13
Silver	Daniela Gimenez	Swimming	Women's 100m Freestyle S9	August 14
Silver	Matias De Andrade	Swimming	Men's 100m Backstroke S7	August 14
Silver	Enrique Rotondo	Athletics	Men's 400m T36	August 14
Silver	Argentina men's national football 5-a-side team: Federico Acardi; Dario Lencina; David Peralta; Silvio Velo; Angel Deldo Garcia; German Muleck; Lucas Rodríguez; Maximiliano Espinilloi; Koki Padilla; Nico Veliz	Football 5-a-side	Men's tournament	August 14
Silver	Alexis Acosta; Eduardo Aguilar; Franco Bravo; Alberto Cretton Salas	Athletics	Men's 4X100m Relay T11-13	August 14
Bronze	Jose Buzzo; Ivan Costa; Tadeo Villagra	Boccia	Pairs BC4	August 8
Bronze	Ezequiel Romero; Raul Villalba	Cycling	Mixed Road Race B	August 8
Bronze	Lucas Poggi	Swimming	Men's 100m Backstroke S8	August 8
Bronze	Marco Pulleiro	Swimming	Men's 400m Freestyle S9	August 9
Bronze	Anabel Moro	Swimming	Women's 100m Backstroke S13	August 9
Bronze	Nicolas Aravena	Athletics	Men's 100m T35	August 10
Bronze	Sebastian Baldassarri	Athletics	Men's Discus Throw F11	August 10
Bronze	Daniela Gimenez	Swimming	Women's 100m Butterfly S10	August 10
Bronze	Fernando Eberhardt	Table Tennis	Men's Singles C1	August 10
Bronze	Gabriel Copola	Table Tennis	Men's Singles C3	August 10
Bronze	Elias Romero	Table Tennis	Men's Singles C5	August 10
Bronze	Daniel Rodriguez	Table Tennis	Men's Singles C5	August 10
Bronze	Sebastian Gonzalez	Boccia	Mixed Singles BC2	August 11
Bronze	Ezequiel Romero; Raul Villalba	Cycling	Mixed Time Trial B	August 11
Bronze	Mariano Dominguez	Athletics	Men's 400m T37	August 12
Bronze	Rocio Ledesma	Judo	Women's 52 kg	August 12
Bronze	Marco Pulleiro	Swimming	Men's 200m Individual Medley S9	August 12
Bronze	Daniela Gimenez	Swimming	Women's 200m Individual Medley S10	August 12
Bronze	Facundo Arregui; Pipo Carlomagno; Bruno Lemaire; Marco Pulleiro	Swimming	Men's 4 × 100 m Freestyle Relay 34 pt	August 13
Bronze	Guillermo Marro	Swimming	Men's 100m Backstroke S7	August 14
Bronze	Matias De Andrade; Facundo Lazo; Bruno Lemaire; Marco Pulleiro	Swimming	Men's 4 × 100 m Medley Relay 34 pt	August 14
Bronze	Daniel Gauna	Athletics	Men's Javelin Throw F46	August 14
Bronze	Lis Scaroni	Athletics	Women's 100m T37	August 14

Medals by sport
Sport	1st place, gold medalist(s)	2nd place, silver medalist(s)	3rd place, bronze medalist(s)	Total
Swimming	9	7	9	25
Athletics	4	8	5	17
Wheelchair Tennis	2	0	0	2
Cycling	2	1	2	5
Judo	1	2	1	4
Table Tennis	0	4	4	8
Boccia	0	1	2	3
Football 5-a-side	0	1	0	1
Total	18	24	23	65

Medals by day
Day	1st place, gold medalist(s)	2nd place, silver medalist(s)	3rd place, bronze medalist(s)	Total
August 8	2	2	3	7
August 9	2	2	5	9
August 10	4	7	4	15
August 11	3	1	2	6
August 12	2	4	4	10
August 13	2	3	1	6
August 14	3	5	4	12
Total	18	24	23	65

== Archery ==
Argentina sent one male athlete to compete.

Athlete	Event	Qualification		Round of 16	Quarterfinals	Semifinals	Final / BM	Rank
Athlete	Event	Score	Seed	Opposition Score	Opposition Score	Opposition Score	Opposition Score	Rank
Federico Luis Paolorossi	Compound Men's Open	623	11	Evans (CAN); L 136-137	Did not advance			

== Athletics ==
Argentina sent 22 male and 11 female athletes to compete.

Men

Athlete	Event	Semifinal		Final	
Athlete	Event	Result	Rank	Result	Rank
Alexis Acosta; Bruno Zanacchi	100m T11	13.16	10th	Did not advance	
Franco Bravo; Martin Sabio	100m T11	12.47	8th	Did not advance	
Alberto Cretton Salas; Ignacio Pignataro	100m T11	12.28	6th	Did not advance	
Eduardo Aguilar; Juan Jasid	100m T12	11.55	6th	Did not advance	
Nicolas Aravena	100m T35	—N/a		13.34	(bronze)
Hernan Barreto	100m T35	—N/a		12.82	(gold)
Diego Gonzalez	100m T35	—N/a		13.71	4th
Alexis Alvarez	100m T36	—N/a		13.55	6th
Enrique Rotondo	100m T36	—N/a		12.73	(silver)
Daniel Tataren	100m T37	—N/a		12.18	4th
Ever Caceres	100m T47	11.92	10th	Did not advance	
Matias Puebla	100m T47	11.87	9th	Did not advance	
Braian Villarreal	100m T47	11.64	7th Q	11.59	7th
Facundo Rodriguez	100m T54	—N/a		22.01	8th
Alberto Cretton Salas; Bruno Zanacchi	200m T11	24.34	6th	Did not advance	
Franco Bravo; Martin Sabio	200m T11	25.77	9th	Did not advance	
Eduardo Aguilar; Juan Jasid	200m T12	24.06	5th Q	23.56	4th
Alexis Alvarez	200m T36	—N/a		28.31	5th
Enrique Rotondo	200m T36	—N/a		26.99	(silver)
Ever Caceres	200m T47	24.94	12th	Did not advance	
Braian Villarreal	200m T47	24.13	10th	Did not advance	
Alberto Cretton Salas; Ignacio Pignataro	400m T11	57.15	6th	Did not advance	
Alexis Alvarez	400m T36	—N/a		1:01.31	4th
Enrique Rotondo	400m T36	—N/a		59.62	(silver)
Mariano Dominguez	400m T37	—N/a		56.78	(bronze)
Braian Villarreal	400m T47	—N/a		Did not finish	
Mariano Dominguez	1500m T38	—N/a		4:50.91	5th
Alexis Acosta; Eduardo Aguilar; Franco Bravo; Alberto Cretton Salas	4X100m Relay T11-13	—N/a		46.00	(silver)

Field events

Athlete	Event	Final	
Athlete	Event	Distance	Position
Jonathan Avellaneda	High Jump T42/44/47	1.55	8th
Alexis Acosta	Long Jump T11/12	5.31	6th
Daniel Tataren	Long Jump T37	5.57	(silver)
Ever Caceres	Long Jump T47	5.52	9th
Matias Puebla	Long Jump T47	6.14	5th
Sebastian Baldassarri	Shot Put F11/12	10.19	5th
Sergio Paz	Shot Put F11/12	9.92	6th
Hugo Lemus	Shot Put F37	10.44	5th
Sebastian Marcenaro	Shot Put F37	9.58	8th
Leandro Ricci	Shot Put F37	12.17	(silver)
Daniel Gauna	Shot Put F46	9.67	6th
Sebastian Baldassarri	Discus Throw F11	32.81	(bronze)
Sergio Paz	Discus Throw F11	33.12	(silver)
Hugo Lemus	Discus Throw F37	37.13	6th
Sebastian Marcenaro	Discus Throw F37	33.89	8th
Leandro Ricci	Discus Throw F37	41.11	(silver)
Daniel Gauna	Discus Throw F46	28.43	4th
Facundo Rodriguez	Discus Throw F54/55/56	23.17	15th
Daniel Gauna	Javelin Throw F46	45.62	(bronze)
Matias Puebla	Javelin Throw F46	41.48	4th
Facundo Rodriguez	Javelin Throw F56	24.49	7th

Women

Athlete	Event	Semifinal		Final	
Athlete	Event	Result	Rank	Result	Rank
Yohana Aguilar; Marcos Seitz	100m T12	13.54	5th	Did not advance	
Marcela Carabajal	100m T36	—N/a		16.42	7th
Yanina Martinez	100m T36	—N/a		14.31	(gold)
Milagros Nunez	100m T36	—N/a		18.00	8th
Lis Scaroni	100m T37	—N/a		14.74	(bronze)
Aldana Ibanez	100m T47	Disqualified			
Antonella Urso	100m T47	14.54	8th Q	14.59	8th
Margarita Vega	100m T47	14.24	7th Q	14.36	7th
Yohana Aguilar; Marcos Seitz	200m T12	28.87	5th	Did not advance	
Marcela Carabajal	200m T36	—N/a		35.52	7th
Yanina Martinez	200m T36	—N/a		30.63	(gold)
Milagro Nunez	200m T36	—N/a		37.11	8th
Lis Scaroni	200m T37	—N/a		31.33	(gold)
Aldana Ibanez	200m T47	29.83	9th	Did not advance	
Antonella Urso	200m T47	30.41	10th	Did not advance	
Margarita Vega	200m T47	29.63	8th Q	29.84	8th

Field events

Athlete	Event	Final	
Athlete	Event	Distance	Position
Mariela Almada	Shot Put F11/12	10.58	5th
Florencia Romero	Shot Put F11/12	8.57	6th
Perla Munoz	Shot Put F35/36	7.42	4th
Mariela Almada	Discus Throw F11/12	37.00	6th
Florencia Romero	Discus Throw F11/12	24.45	4th

== Boccia ==
Argentina sent seven male and three female athletes to compete.

Individual

Athlete	Event	Round robin			Quarterfinals	Semifinals	Final / BM	Rank
Athlete	Event	Match 1	Match 2	Match 3	Quarterfinals	Semifinals	Final / BM	Rank
Athlete	Event	Opposition Result	Opposition Result	Opposition Result	Opposition Result	Opposition Result	Opposition Result	Rank
Roberto Leglise	Singles BC1	Mason (USA); W 11-0	Pagua (VEN); L 2-5	Ventura (MEX); L 2-3	—N/a	Did not advance		7th
Mauricio Ibarbure	Singles BC1	Germano (BRA); W 6-3	Mawji (CAN); L 1-3	—N/a		Chagas (BRA); L 2-7	Ventura (MEX); L 3-4	4th
Jonatan Aquino	Singles BC2	Gonzalez (ARG); L 2-4	Dukovich (CAN); L 1-9	Hiltner (USA); W 4-1	—N/a	Did not advance		9th
Sebastian Gonzalez	Singles BC2	Aquino (ARG); W 4-2	Hiltner (USA); W 9-0	Dukovich (CAN); L 2-3	—N/a	De Souza (BRA); L 0-10	Ferreira (BRA); W 6-5	(bronze)
Gabriela Villano	Singles BC3	Ebergenyi (MEX); L 0-8	Gauthier (CAN); L 3-3	Garneau (CAN); W 4-2	Did not advance			13th
Maria Pena	Singles BC3	Leme (BRA); L 1-9	Bussiere (CAN); L 2-4	Aya (COL); L 3-6	Did not advance			14th
Belen Ruiz	Singles BC3	Martins (BRA); L 2-6	Rodriguez (COL); L 5-8	—N/a	Did not advance			9th
Tadeo Villagra	Singles BC4	Costa (ARG); W 8-1	Manuel (MEX); L 0-4	Dos Santos (BRA); L 3-3	Levine (CAN); L 2-8	Did not advance		7th
Ivan Costa	Singles BC4	Villagra (ARG); L 1-8	Dos Santos (BRA); L 0-10	Manuel (MEX); W 3-1	Did not advance			13th
Jose Buzzo	Singles BC4	Dispaltro (CAN); L 0-10	Amaya (MEX); W 4-1	—N/a	Dos Santos (BRA); L 0-13	Did not advance		8th

Team & Pairs competitions

Athlete(s)	Event	Final			
Athlete(s)	Event	Opposition Score	Opposition Score	Opposition Score	Rank
Mauricio Ibarbure; Roberto Leglise; Jonatan Aquino; Sebastian Gonzalez	Team BC1/BC2	Canada; W 10-3	Brazil; L 4-14	United States; W 10-1	(silver)
Maria Pena; Belen Ruiz; Gabriela Villano	Pairs BC3	Canada; L 2-6	Brazil; L 1-8	Colombia; L 0-7	4th
Jose Buzzo; Ivan Costa; Tadeo Villagra	Pairs BC4	Canada; L 0-6	Brazil; L 0-11	Mexico; W 6-3	(bronze)

== Cycling ==
Argentina sent nine male and three female athletes to compete.

Road

Athlete	Event	Time	Rank
Andres Biga	Men's Road Race H3-5	1:37:26	7th
Mariela Delgado	Women's Road Race C1-5	1:21:07	(silver)
Maximiliano Gomez; Emanuel Conradol	Mixed Road Race B	Did not finish	
Raul Villalba; Ezequiel Romero	Mixed Road Race B	2:09:38	(bronze)
Cristina Otero	Mixed Road Race T1-2	1:39:54	7th
Fernando Ricatti; Diego Langoni	Mixed Time Trial B	29:35.50	6th
Raul Villalba; Ezequiel Romero	Mixed Time Trial B	31:55.76	8th
Andres Biga	Mixed Time Trial H1-5	21:49.69	9th
Cristina Otero	Mixed Time Trial T1-2	28:22.82	7th
Rodrigo Lopez	Mixed Time Trial C1-5	29:30.39	14th
Mariela Delgado	Mixed Time Trial C1-5	30:20.45	21st

Track

Athlete	Event	Qualification		Final / BM	
Athlete	Event	Time	Rank	Opposition Time	Rank
Rodrigo Lopez	Men's Individual Pursuit C1-3	4:11.005	7th	Did not advance	
Rodrigo Lopez	Men's 1 km Time Trial C1-5	—N/a		1:09.417	8th
Mariela Delgado	Women's Individual Pursuit C1-5	4:01.847	2nd Q	4:03.070	(gold)
Mariela Delgado	Women's 500m Time Trial C1-5	—N/a		38.893	(gold)
Raul Villalba; Ezequiel Romero	Mixed Individual Pursuit B	4:49.371	3rd q	4:51.636	4th
Fernando Ricatti; Diego Langoni	Mixed Individual Pursuit B	5:01.685	5th	Did not advance	
Raul Villalba; Ezequiel Romero	Mixed Time Trial B	—N/a		1:07.545	(bronze)
Fernando Ricatti; Diego Langoni	Mixed Time Trial B	—N/a		1:14.351	8th

Key:
Q – qualified to gold medal race
q – qualified to bronze medal race
OVL – overlapped

== Football 5-a-side ==
Argentina sent a team of ten athletes to compete:

- Federico Acardi
- Angel Deldo Garcia
- Maximiliano Espinillo
- Dario Lencina
- German Muleck
- Koki Padilla
- David Peralta
- Lucas Rodríguez
- Nico Veliz
- Silvio Velo

Preliminary Round

Team	P	W	D	L	G	GA	GD	Points
Brazil (BRA)	5	4	1	0	17	0	+17	13
Argentina (ARG)	5	3	2	0	10	1	+9	11
Colombia (COL)	5	2	2	1	7	5	+2	8
Mexico (MEX)	5	2	0	3	3	9	-6	6
Uruguay (URU)	5	0	2	3	1	12	-11	2
Chile (CHI)	5	0	1	4	1	12	-11	1

Qualified to Gold-medal match
Qualified to Bronze-medal match
08 August
16:00

Argentina	6 – 0	Uruguay
Rodriguez 4' 48'; Velo 13' 46'; Padilla 25'; Espinillo 27'	Report

Referee: Lucio Morgado (BRA)

09 August
18:00

Argentina	1 – 0	Mexico
Espinillo 35'	Report

Referee: Francois Carcouet (FRA)

10 August
20:00

Argentina	1 – 1	Colombia
Veliz 12'	Report	Perez Quintero 45'

Referee: Lucio Morgado (BRA)

12 August
18:00

Argentina	0 – 0	Brazil
	Report

Referee: Francois Carcouet (FRA)

13 August
18:00

Argentina	2 – 0	Chile
Rodriguez 12'; Padilla 19'	Report

Referee: Germi Guimaraes (BRA)

Gold-medal match

14 August
18:00

(silver) Argentina	1 – 2	Brazil (gold)
Espinillo 46'	Report	De Conceicao 7'; Steinmetz Alvez 44'

Referee: Lucio Morgado (BRA)

== Football 7-a-side ==
Argentina sent a team of 14 athletes to compete.

- Alberto Alabarce
- Matias Bassi
- Duncan Coronel
- Mariano Cortes
- Maximiliano Fernandez
- Matias Fernandez Romano
- Claudio Figuera
- Ezequiel Jaime
- Rodrigo Lugrin
- Rodrigo Luquez
- Lautaro Marzolini
- Pablo Molina Lopez
- Mariano Morana
- Gustavo Nahuelquin

Preliminary Round

Team	P	W	D	L	G	GA	GD	Points
Brazil (BRA)	4	4	0	0	28	0	+28	12
Argentina (ARG)	4	3	0	1	8	8	0	9
Canada (CAN)	4	1	1	2	4	13	-9	4
Venezuela (VEN)	4	0	2	2	2	13	-11	2
United States (USA)	4	0	1	3	2	10	-8	1

Qualified to Gold-medal match
Qualified to Bronze-medal match
08 August
11:00

Argentina	3 – 1	Canada
Cortes 4'; Lugrin 30'; Fernandez 54'	Report	Charron 42'

Referee: Skye Arthur-Banning (USA)

09 August
09:00

Argentina	4 – 0	Venezuela
Morana 10' 22'; Cortes 41'; Coronel 58'	Report

Referee: Alexis Vaughan (CAN)

10 August
09:00

Argentina	0 – 7	Brazil
	Report	Monteiro Guimaraes 6' 12'; De Oliveira Gomes 15'; Ferreira De Almeyda 21' 30'; Silva De Oliveira 37'; De Souza 42'

Referee: Ross Haswell (GBR)

12 August
09:00

Argentina	1 – 0	United States
Lugrin 40'	Report

Referee: Yusri Rudolf (CAN)

Gold-medal match

15 August
11:00

Argentina	1 – 3	Brazil
Bassi 15' (pen.)	Report	De Oliveira Gomes 11'; Monteiro Guimares 44'; Ferreira de Almeida 54'

Referee: Ross Haswell (GBR)

== Goalball ==
Argentina sent a team of six athletes to compete in the men's tournament.

- Alejandro Almada
- Patricio Finoli
- Daniel Gomez
- Hector Kloster
- Tobias Ramos
- Marcelo Sarmiento

Preliminary Round

Team	Pld	W	D	L	GF	GA	GD	Pts
Brazil (BRA)	5	5	0	0	52	10	+42	15
Canada (CAN)	5	4	0	1	36	20	+16	12
United States (USA)	5	3	0	2	40	27	+13	9
Argentina (ARG)	5	2	0	3	44	35	+9	6
Venezuela (VEN)	5	1	0	4	23	53	−30	3
Puerto Rico (PUR)	5	0	0	5	4	54	−50	0

Qualified for the semifinals

08 August; 11:30	Argentina	6 – 11	Brazil	Referees: Kevin Tu (CHN); Eva Sorkkila (FIN)
08 August; 11:30		Report		Referees: Kevin Tu (CHN); Eva Sorkkila (FIN)

09 August; 15:15	Argentina	2 – 7	Canada	Referees: Anthony Connolly (USA); Raili Sipura (FIN)
09 August; 15:15		Report		Referees: Anthony Connolly (USA); Raili Sipura (FIN)

10 August; 11:30	Argentina	10 – 0	Puerto Rico	Referees: Raili Sipura (FIN); Liana Rocha (BRA)
10 August; 11:30		Report		Referees: Raili Sipura (FIN); Liana Rocha (BRA)

11 August; 10:15	Argentina	10 – 11	United States	Referees: Vasileia Avraam (GRE); Liana Rocha (BRA)
11 August; 10:15		Report		Referees: Vasileia Avraam (GRE); Liana Rocha (BRA)

12 August; 09:00	Argentina	16 – 6	Venezuela	Referees: Raili Sipura (FIN); Launel Scott (CAN)
12 August; 09:00		Report		Referees: Raili Sipura (FIN); Launel Scott (CAN)

Semifinal

14 August; 13:00	Argentina	4 – 9	Brazil	Referees: Raili Sipura (FIN); Launel Scott (CAN)
14 August; 13:00		Report		Referees: Raili Sipura (FIN); Launel Scott (CAN)

Bronze-medal match

15 August; 10:00	Argentina	3 – 13	Canada
15 August; 10:00		Report

== Judo ==
Argentina sent five male and three female athletes to compete.

Men

Athlete	Event	Round of 16	Quarterfinals	Semifinals	Repechage	Final	Rank
Athlete	Event	Opposition Result	Opposition Result	Opposition Result	Opposition Result	Opposition Result	Rank
Eduardo Gauto	60 kg	Bye	Acosta (CUB); W 100-000S1	Mesquita (BRA); W 001S2-000S1	—N/a	Borges (URU); L 000S1-011S1	2nd place, silver medalist(s)
David Gomez	60 kg	Bye	Hawthorne (USA); L 000-101	Did not advance	Castellanos (COL); L 000-100	Did not advance	7th
Jose Effron	81 kg	Bye	Carvallo (VEN); W 110-000H	Cruz (CUB); W 010S2-000S2	—N/a	Avila (MEX); L 001S3-010S2	2nd place, silver medalist(s)
Jorge Lencina	90 kg	Bye		Da Silva (BRA); W 100-000	—N/a	Hierrezuelo (CUB); W 000S2-000S3	1st place, gold medalist(s)

Athlete	Event	Round robin				Rank
Athlete	Event	Opposition Result	Opposition Result	Opposition Result	Opposition Result	Rank
Fabian Ramirez	73 kg	Rodriguez (CUB); L 001S1-100	Mata (USA); W 100-000	Briceno (VEN); L 010S1-011S3	Nascimento (BRA); L 000S1-110	4th

Women

Athlete	Event	Round robin				Rank
Athlete	Event	Opposition Result	Opposition Result	Opposition Result	Opposition Result	Rank
Paula Gomez	48 kg	Cardoso (BRA); L 010-011S1	Oliano (BRA); W 100S1-001	—N/a		2nd
Rocio Ledesma	52 kg	Canteiro (BRA); W 101-000	Thomas (USA); W 100-000	Ferreira (BRA); L 000-100	Gagne (CAN); L 000-100	3rd place, bronze medalist(s)
Sol Intrevado	63 kg	Rodriguez (CUB); L 000-100	Santos (BRA); L 000S1-100S1	—N/a		3rd

== Powerlifting ==
Argentina sent three male and one female athletes to compete.

Athlete	Event	Attempts					Rank
Athlete	Event	Attempt 1	Attempt 2	Attempt 3	Attempt 4	Total	Rank
Pablo Melgar	Men's 59kg	112	~~116~~	~~121~~	-	112	5th
David Coronel	Men's 65kg	133	~~140~~	~~140~~	-	133	5th
Lucas Gareca	Men's 88kg	140	144	~~147~~	-	144	6th
Karen Rodriguez	Women's 50kg	48	53	~~55~~	-	53	4th

== Swimming ==
Argentina sent eighteen male and seven female swimmers to compete.

Men

Athletes	Event	Heat		Final	
Athletes	Event	Time	Rank	Time	Rank
Maximiliano Matto	50m Freestyle S4	—N/a		1:26.73	8th
Facundo Arregui	50m Freestyle S7	33.98	6 Q	33.99	6th
Guillermo Marro	50m Freestyle S7	35.63	9	Did not advance	
Inaki Basiloff	50m Freestyle S8	33.20	8 Q	32.58	8th
Bruno Lemaire	50m Freestyle S10	—N/a		27.43	5th
Jonas Simone	50m Freestyle S12	—N/a		29.28	5th
Enzo Fais	50m Freestyle S13	—N/a		30.02	6th
Facundo Arregui	100m Freestyle S7	1:12.57	5 Q	1:12.75	7th
Bruno Lemaire	100m Freestyle S10	—N/a		58.85	6th
Jonas Simone	100m Freestyle S12	—N/a		1:04.95	4th
Enzo Fais	100m Freestyle S13	—N/a		1:06.62	7th
Facundo Arregui	400m Freestyle S7	—N/a		5:05.93	(gold)
Lucas Poggi	400m Freestyle S8	—N/a		5:22.11	5th
Inaki Basiloff	400m Freestyle S8	—N/a		5:21.74	4th
Marco Pulleiro	400m Freestyle S9	—N/a		4:39.29	(bronze)
Bruno Lemaire	400m Freestyle S10	—N/a		4:39.99	4th
Enzo Fais	400m Freestyle S13	5:25.55	9 Q	5:22.50	8th
Sergio Zayas	400m Freestyle S13	5:08.61	7 Q	5:03.48	6th
Ariel Quassi	50m Backstroke S5	—N/a		50.79	5th
Matias de Andrade	100m Backstroke S7	1:20.49	3 Q	1:15.26	(silver)
Guillermo Marro	100m Backstroke S7	1:18.09	2 Q	1:18.80	(bronze)
Inaki Basiloff	100m Backstroke S8	—N/a		1:21.08	6th
Pipo Carlomagno	100m Backstroke S8	—N/a		1:10.34	(gold)
Lucas Poggi	100m Backstroke S8	—N/a		1:14.95	(bronze)
Amilcar Guerra	100m Backstroke S10	—N/a		1:09.04	6th
Sergio Zayas	100m Backstroke S11	—N/a		1:17.82	(gold)
Franco Medina	100m Backstroke S13	—N/a		1:25.65	6th
Jonas Simone	100m Backstroke S13	—N/a		1:21.15	5th
Elian Araya	100m Backstroke S14	—N/a		1:08.45	4th
Maximiliano Matto	50m Breaststroke SB3	1:39.68	10th	Did not advance	
Ariel Quassi	100m Breaststroke SB4	—N/a		1:55.82	(silver)
Pipo Carlomagno	100m Breaststroke SB7	—N/a		1:34.10	(silver)
Facundo Lazo	100m Breaststroke SB8	1:19.07	1 Q	1:18.85	(gold)
Agustin Orellana	100m Breaststroke SB8	1:28.74	5 Q	1:25.48	4th
Franco Medina	100m Breaststroke SB13	—N/a		1:28.78	6th
Elian Araya	100m Breaststroke SB14	1:11.36	1 Q	1:10.91	(gold)
Ariel Quassi	50m Butterfly S5	56.46	7 Q	53.57	6th
Agustin Orellana	100m Butterfly S8	—N/a		1:11.33	4th
Marco Pulleiro	100m Butterfly S9	—N/a		1:03.54	(silver)
Amilcar Guerra	100m Butterfly S10	—N/a		1:06.24	5th
Sergio Zayas	100m Butterfly S13	—N/a		1:22.85	7th
Ariel Quassi	200m Individual Medley SM6	3:55.86	6 Q	3:55.22	6th
Matias De Andrade	200m Individual Medley SM7	—N/a		3:06.51	5th
Pipo Carlomagno	200m Individual Medley SM8	2:51.95	5 Q	2:50.67	6th
Agustin Orellana	200m Individual Medley SM8	2:55.02	6 Q	2:44.82	4th
Lucas Poggi	200m Individual Medley SM8	3:06.37	8 Q	3:05.68	8th
Amilcar Guerra	200m Individual Medley SM9	—N/a		2:34.05	4th
Facundo Lazo	200m Individual Medley SM9	—N/a		2:41.83	5th
Marco Pulleiro	200m Individual Medley SM9	—N/a		2:32.36	(bronze)
Sergio Zayas	200m Individual Medley SM11	—N/a		2:52.37	4th
Franco Medina	200m Individual Medley SM13	3:03.10	9	Did not advance	
Jonas Simone	200m Individual Medley SM13	2:48.84	8 Q	2:47.52	8th
Elian Araya	200m Individual Medley SM14	2:29.74	4 Q	2:29.69	4th
Facundo Arregui; Pipo Carlomagno; Bruno Lemaire; Marco Pulleiro	4 × 100 m Freestyle Relay 34 pt	—N/a		4:23.04	(bronze)
Matias De Andrade; Facundo Lazo; Bruno Lemaire; Marco Pulleiro	4 × 100 m Medley Relay 34 pt	—N/a		4:35.81	(bronze)

Women

Athletes	Event	Heat		Final	
Athletes	Event	Time	Rank	Time	Rank
Daniela Gimenez	50m Freestyle S9	30.51	1 Q	30.18	(gold)
Nadia Baez	50m Freestyle S12	—N/a		35.47	5th
Mailen Benitez	50m Freestyle S12	—N/a		Disqualified	
Florencia de la Vega	50m Freestyle S12	—N/a		36.11	7th
Anabel Moro	50m Freestyle S12	—N/a		30.65	(silver)
Ana Pellitero	50m Freestyle S12	—N/a		31.69	4th
Daniela Gimenez	100m Freestyle S9	—N/a		1:06.56	(silver)
Nadia Baez	100m Freestyle S12	—N/a		1:21.37	7th
Mailen Benitez	100m Freestyle S12	—N/a		1:42.19	8th
Florencia de la Vega	100m Freestyle S12	—N/a		1:17.40	6th
Anabel Moro	100m Freestyle S12	—N/a		1:06.87	(gold)
Ana Pellitero	100m Freestyle S12	—N/a		1:10.80	4th
Ana Pellitero	400m Freestyle S13	—N/a		5:44.22	5th
Elizabeth Noriega	100m Backstroke S6	—N/a		2:02.43	7th
Mailen Benitez	100m Backstroke S13	—N/a		1:58.98	8th
Florencia de la Vega	100m Backstroke S13	—N/a		1:31.26	6th
Anabel Moro	100m Backstroke S13	—N/a		1:21.88	(bronze)
Ana Pellitero	100m Backstroke S13	—N/a		1:20.66	(silver)
Daniela Gimenez	100m Breaststroke SB9	—N/a		1:21.36	(gold)
Nadia Baez	100m Breaststroke SB14	—N/a		1:33.06	5th
Florencia de la Vega	100m Breaststroke SB14	—N/a		1:40.47	7th
Anabel Moro	100m Breaststroke SB14	—N/a		1:26.24	(gold)
Daniela Gimenez	100m Butterfly S10	1:13.91	4 Q	1:12.20	(bronze)
Daniela Gimenez	200m Individual Medley S10	2:41.76	2 Q	2:39.63	(bronze)

== Table tennis ==
Argentina sent twelve male and four female table tennis players to compete.

Men

Athlete	Event	Round robin				Quarterfinals	Semifinals	Final	Rank
Athlete	Event	Match 1	Match 2	Match 3	Match 4	Quarterfinals	Semifinals	Final	Rank
Athlete	Event	Opposition Result	Opposition Result	Opposition Result	Opposition Result	Opposition Result	Opposition Result	Opposition Result	Rank
Fernando Eberhardt	Singles C1	Braga (BRA); L 2-3	Cuenca (CUB); W 3-0	De Francesco (USA); W 3-0	—N/a		Lima (BRA); L 0-3	Did not advance	3rd place, bronze medalist(s)
Carlos Duarte	Singles C2	Conceicao (BRA); L 0-3	Rojas (VEN); W 3-0	Marcio (BRA); L 0-3	Pinheiro (BRA); L 0-3	—N/a			4
Gabriel Copola	Singles C3	Emburgh (USA); W 3-0	Moreira (BRA); W 3-1	—N/a		Bye	Andrade (BRA); L 0-3	Did not advance	3rd place, bronze medalist(s)
Elias Romero	Singles C5	Segatto (BRA); L 1-3	Mudassar (CAN); W 3-1	—N/a		La Rose (TRI); W 3-1	Depergola (ARG); L 0-3	Did not advance	3rd place, bronze medalist(s)
Mauro Depergola	Singles C5	Castaneda (COL); W 3-1	Pattison (USA); W 3-0	—N/a		Bye	Romero (ARG); W 3-0	Segatto (BRA); L 0-3	2nd place, silver medalist(s)
Daniel Rodriguez	Singles C5	La Rose (TRI); W 3-0	Caplin (USA); W 3-0	—N/a		Pattison (USA); W 3-1	Segatto (BRA); L 1-3	Did not advance	3rd place, bronze medalist(s)
Aleksy Kaniuka	Singles C7	Pereira (BRA); L 0-3	Vasquez (ESA); W 3-0	Starling (USA); W 3-2	—N/a	Dettoni (CHI); L 0-3	Did not advance		5
Pablo Ferro	Singles C7	Salmin (BRA); L 0-3	Giraud (VEN); L 0-3	Mojtahed (CAN); L 0-3	—N/a	Did not advance			7
Pablo Kroztch	Singles C8	Guarnieri (BRA); L 0-3	Morales (CHI); L 2-3	—N/a		Did not advance			7
Alejandro Perez	Singles C8	Gomez (DOM); W 3-2	Salazar (ECU); W 3-1	Kent (CAN); L 0-3	—N/a	Polo (ECU); L 0-3	Did not advance		5
Dario Neira	Singles C10	Rodriguez (CUB); W 3-0	Massad (BRA); L 0-3	Hidalgo (CRC); W 3-1	—N/a	Manso (CUB); L 2-3	Did not advance		5
Hugo Quagliardi	Singles C10	Carbinato (BRA); L 0-3	Vazquez (PUR); L 1-3	—N/a		Did not advance			7
Carlos Duarte; Fernando Eberhardt	Team C1-2	Brazil (BRA); L 0-3, 0-3	Cuba (CUB); W 3-0, 0-3, 3-1	United States (USA); W 3-0, 3-0	—N/a				2nd place, silver medalist(s)
Gabriel Copola; Mauro Depergola; Daniel Rodriguez	Team C5	United States (USA); W 3-0, 3-0	Colombia (COL); W 3-1, 3-2	Brazil (BRA); L 2-3, 0-3	—N/a				2nd place, silver medalist(s)
Alejandro Perez; Aleksy Kaniuka; Pablo Kroztch	Team C6-8	Canada (CAN); L 1-3, 1-3	Venezuela (VEN); W 3-1, 3-2	Chile (CHI); L 3-1, 0-3, 2-3	—N/a		Did not advance		5
Dario Neira; Hugo Quagliardi; Pablo Ferro	Team C9-10	United States (USA); L 3-2, 0-3, 2-3	Puerto Rico (PUR); W 3-0, 3-0	—N/a		Mexico (MEX); L 0-3, 0-3	Did not advance		5

Women's

Athlete	Event	Round Robin				Rank
Athlete	Event	Opposition Result	Opposition Result	Opposition Result	Opposition Result	Rank
Constanza Garrone	Singles C1-2	Da Silva (BRA); L 0-3	Profitt (USA); L 1-3	Padilla (MEX); L 2-3	—N/a	4
Paola Ranieli	Singles C6-7	Munoz (ARG); L 0-3	Chan (CAN); L 0-3	Araya (CRC); L 0-3	Umscheid (USA); L 0-3	5
Giselle Munoz	Singles C6-7	Ranieli (ARG); W 3-0	Araya (CRC); W 3-1	Umscheid (USA); W 3-0	Chan (CAN); L 0-3	2nd place, silver medalist(s)
Analia Longhi	Singles C9-10	Morales (CHI); L 2-3	Marques (BRA); L 0-3	Rauen (BRA); L 0-3	—N/a	4

== Wheelchair basketball ==
Argentina sent a team of twelve male athletes and a team of twelve female athletes to compete in the men's and women's tournaments.

Men

- Adolfo Berdun
- Daniel Copa
- Mario Dominguez
- Carlos Esteche
- Joel Gabas
- Cristian Gomez
- Julio Kowalczuk
- Fernando Ovejero
- Adrian J. Perez
- Amado Perez
- Maximiliano Ruggeri
- Gustavo Villafane

Group B

Pool B
Team	Pld	W	L	PF	PA	PD	Pts	Qualification
Canada (CAN)	2	2	0	176	82	+94	4	Qualified for the quarterfinals
Argentina (ARG)	2	2	0	143	73	+70	4	Qualified for the quarterfinals
Mexico (MEX)	2	0	2	105	142	−37	2	Qualified for the quarterfinals
Venezuela (VEN)	2	0	2	50	177	−127	2	Qualified for the quarterfinals

08 August
08:00

Report

Argentina	68–50	Mexico
Scoring by quarter: 16–13, 15–18, 24–5, 13–14

Referees: Sebastian Gauthier (CAN)

10 August
16:15

Report

Argentina	75–23	Venezuela
Scoring by quarter: 19–4, 25–2, 21–9, 10–8

Referees: Gustavo Mathias (BRA)

11 August
18:30

Report

Argentina	62–68	Canada
Scoring by quarter: 13–13, 17–16, 16–22, 16–17

Referees: Darrell Hargreaves (USA)

Quarterfinal

13 August
18:30

Report

Argentina	62–56	Colombia
Scoring by quarter: 16–22, 10–8, 18–13, 18–13

Referees: Sebastian Gauthier (CAN)

Semifinal

14 August
10:30

Report

Argentina	36–59	United States
Scoring by quarter: 9–16, 6–14, 8–11, 13–18

Referees: Sebastian Gauthier (CAN)

Bronze-medal match

15 August
08:30

Argentina	vs.	Brazil
Scoring by quarter: –, –, –, –

Women

- Alejandra Alonso
- Marcela Birck
- Mariana Capdeville
- Maria Castaldi
- Monica Chazarreta
- Maria Chirinos
- Constanza Coronel
- Silvia Linari
- Adriana Motura
- Julieta Olmedo
- Fernanda Pallares
- Mariana Perez

Group B

Pool B
Team	Pld	W	L	PF	PA	PD	Pts	Qualification
United States	3	3	0	256	35	+221	6	Qualified for the semifinals
Argentina	3	2	1	117	151	−34	5	Qualified for the semifinals
Peru	3	1	2	100	147	−47	4	
El Salvador	3	0	3	60	200	−140	3	

09 August
08:00

Report

Argentina	69–27	El Salvador
Scoring by quarter: 12–1, 16–2, 18–15, 23–9

Referees: Karen Colina (COL)

10 August
12:30

Report

Argentina	14–91	United States
Scoring by quarter: 0–26, 6–15, 8–26, 0–24

Referees: Sebastian Gauthier (CAN)

11 August
12:30

Report

Argentina	34–33	Peru
Scoring by quarter: 7–11, 12–6, 6–11, 9–5

Referees: Gustavo Mathias (BRA)

Semifinal

13 August
18:30

Report

Argentina	28–82	Canada
Scoring by quarter: 5–27, 9–17, 8–26, 6–12

Referees: Gustavo Mathias (BRA)

Bronze-medal match

14 August
16:30

Report

Argentina	19–49	Brazil
Scoring by quarter: 5–20, 8–3, 2–13, 4–13

Referees: Jaime Oseguera (USA)

2015 Parapan American Games Fourth place

Argentina

== Wheelchair rugby ==
Argentina sent a team of twelve athletes to compete.

- Leonardo Abess
- Ignacio Arhancet
- Lucas Camussi
- Fernando Canumil
- Matias Cardozo
- Juan Foa
- Mariano Gastaldi
- Juan Herrar
- Brian Nascimento
- Fernando Pantin Colombo
- Nicolas Stupenengo
- Daniel Viegas

Preliminary Round

Team	PLD	W	D	L	PF	PA	PD	Points
Colombia (COL)	1	1	0	0	66	12	+54	2
United States (USA)	1	1	0	0	70	25	+45	2
Canada (CAN)	1	1	0	0	65	32	+33	2
Brazil (BRA)	1	0	0	1	32	65	-33	0
Argentina (ARG)	1	0	0	1	25	70	-45	0
Chile (CHI)	1	0	0	1	12	66	-54	0

08 August
19:15

Argentina	25 – 70	United States
	Report

09 August
19:15

Argentina	53 – 14	Chile
	Report

10 August
17:00

Argentina	26 – 73	Canada
	Report

11 August
15:30

Argentina	37 – 63	Brazil
	Report

12 August
17:45

Argentina	36 – 51	Colombia
	Report

Fifth place match

13 August
15:30

Argentina	56 – 24	Chile
	Report

2015 Parapan American Games Fifth place

Argentina

== Wheelchair tennis ==
Argentina sent two male athletes to compete.

Athlete	Event	Round of 32	Round of 16	Quarterfinals	Semifinals	Final / BM	
Athlete	Event	Opposition Score	Opposition Score	Opposition Score	Opposition Score	Opposition Score	Rank
Gustavo Fernandez	Men's singles	Bye	Cayulef (CHI); W 6-1,6-1	Dembe (CAN); W 6-1,6-1	Oquendo (COL); W 6-1,6-0	Rydberg (USA); W 6-1,6-2	1st place, gold medalist(s)
Ezequiel Casco	Men's singles	Bye	Perez (ESA); W 6-0, 6-0	Oquendo (COL); L 1-6, 6-3, 5-7	Did not advance		5th
Gustavo Fernandez; Ezequiel Casco	Men's doubles	—N/a		Cayulef (CHI); Mendez (CHI); W 6-3, 4-6, 10-2	Baldwin (USA); Rydberg (USA); W 7-6, 6-2	Santos (BRA); Rodrigues (BRA); W 6-2, 6-2	1st place, gold medalist(s)

== See also ==
- Argentina at the 2016 Summer Olympics
- Argentina at the 2016 Summer Paralympics
- Argentina at the 2015 Pan American Games
