= Athletics at the 2015 Parapan American Games – Men's 400 metres T11 =

Athletics – Men's 400 metres T11 at the 2015 Parapan American Games
- Venue: CIBC Athletics Stadium
- Dates: August 10–11
- Competitors: 8 from 6 nations

Medalists
1st place, gold medalist(s)		Felipe de Souza Gomes (Guide: Jorge Pereira Borges)	Brazil
2nd place, silver medalist(s)		Dustin Walsh (Guide: Dylan Williamson)	Canada
3rd place, bronze medalist(s)		Not awarded	

The men's T11 400 metres competition of the athletics events at the 2015 Parapan American Games was held between August 10 and 11 at the CIBC Athletics Stadium. The defending Parapan American Games champion was Daniel Silva of Brazil.

== Records ==
Prior to this competition, the existing records were as follows:

World record	Daniel Silva (BRA)	49.82	Guadalajara, Mexico	November 18, 2011
Americas Record	Daniel Silva (BRA)	49.82	Guadalajara, Mexico	November 18, 2011
Parapan American Games	Daniel Silva (BRA)	49.82	Guadalajara, Mexico	November 18, 2011

== Schedule ==
All times are Central Standard Time (UTC-6).

Date	Time	Round
10 August	18:15	Semifinal 1
10 August	18:21	Semifinal 2
11 August	19:50	Final

== Results ==
All times are shown in seconds.

KEY:	q	Fastest non-qualifiers	Q	Qualified	PR	Parapan American Games record	NR	National record	PB	Personal best	SB	Seasonal best	DSQ	Disqualified	FS	False start	DNF	Did not finish

=== Semifinals ===
The fastest from each heat and next two overall fastest qualified for the final.

==== Semifinal 1 ====
Rank	Name	Nation	Time	Notes
1	Daniel Mendes da Silva (Guide: Heitor de Oliveira Sales)	Brazil	54.10	Q
2	Dustin Walsh (Guide: Dylan Williamson)	Canada	54.10	q
3	Alberton Cretton Salas (Guide: Ignacio Pignataro)	Argentina	57.15	
4	William Sosa (Guide: Cesar Leonardo Chavarro Diaz)	Colombia	DSQ	False Start

==== Semifinal 2 ====
Rank	Name	Nation	Time	Notes
1	Felipe de Souza Gomes (Guide: Jorge Pereira Borges)	Brazil	54.18	Q
2	Jesus Diaz (Guide: Yoandri Mosquera Medina)	Venezuela	55.46	q, PB
3	Mauricio Chavez (Guide: Marcos Ramirez)	Mexico	55.64	
	Delfo Jose Arce Orozco (Guide: Arley Barrios	Colombia	DNF	

=== Final ===
Rank	Name	Nation	Time	Notes
1st place, gold medalist(s)	Felipe de Souza Gomes (Guide: Jorge Pereira Borges)	Brazil	51.13	
2nd place, silver medalist(s)	Dustin Walsh (Guide: Dylan Williamson)	Canada	54.72	
	Jesus Diaz (Guide: Yoandri Mosquera Medina)	Venezuela	DNF	
	Daniel Mendes da Silva (Guide: Heitor de Oliveira Sales)	Brazil	DSQ	
