= Athletics at the 2015 Parapan American Games – Men's 200 metres T12 =

Athletics – Men's 200 metres T12 at the 2015 Parapan American Games
- Venue: CIBC Athletics Stadium
- Dates: August 12
- Competitors: 9 from 7 nations

Medalists
1st place, gold medalist(s)		Leinier Savon	Cuba
2nd place, silver medalist(s)		Diogo Jeronimo da Silva	Brazil
3rd place, bronze medalist(s)		Manuel Martinez	Mexico

The men's T12 200 metres competition of the athletics events at the 2015 Parapan American Games was held on August 12 at the CIBC Athletics Stadium. The defending Parapan American Games champion was Thierb Siqueira of Brazil.

== Records ==
Prior to this competition, the existing records were as follows:

World record	Mateusz Michalski (POL)	21.56	London, Great Britain	8 September 2012
Americas record	Ricardo Santana (VEN)	22.46	Athens, Greece	26 September 2004
Parapan record	Pedro Cezar da Silva Moraes (BRA)	22.48	Rio de Janeiro, Brazil	14 August 2007

== Schedule ==
All times are Central Standard Time (UTC-6).

Date	Time	Round
12 August	16:03	Semifinal 1
12 August	16:08	Semifinal 2
12 August	16:16	Semifinal 3
12 August	20:48	Final

== Results ==
All times are shown in seconds.

KEY:	q	Fastest non-qualifiers	Q	Qualified	PR	Parapan American Games record	AR	Area record	NR	National record	PB	Personal best	SB	Seasonal best	DSQ	Disqualified	FS	False start

=== Semifinals ===
The fastest from each heat and next overall fastest qualified for the final.

==== Semifinal 1 ====
Wind: +3.7 m/s

Rank	Name	Nation	Time	Notes
1	Leinier Savon	Cuba	22.20	Q
2	George Quarcoo (Guide: Adam Johnson)	Canada	23.83	
3	Alexander Piamba Chilito (Guide: Jessi Chara Lasso)	Colombia	24.89	

==== Semifinal 2 ====
Wind: +4.0 m/s

Rank	Name	Nation	Time	Notes
1	Eduardo Aguilar (Guide: Juan Jasid)	Argentina	24.06	Q
2	Erwin Jadir Castillo Rodriguez	Colombia	25.71	
	Benjamin Gonzalez	Mexico	DSQ	Did not start

==== Semifinal 3 ====
Wind: +3.4 m/s

Rank	Name	Nation	Time	Notes
1	Diogo Jeronimo da Silva	Brazil	22.65	Q
2	Manuel Martinez	Mexico	25.71	q
	Josiah Jamison (Guide: Rolland James Slade)	United States	DNF	

=== Final ===
Wind: +2.1 m/s

Rank	Name	Nation	Time	Notes
1st place, gold medalist(s)	Leinier Savon	Cuba	22.06	
2nd place, silver medalist(s)	Diogo Jeronimo da Silva	Brazil	22.05	
3rd place, bronze medalist(s)	Manuel Martinez	Mexico	22.87	
4	Educardo Aguilar (Guide: Juan Jasid)	Argentina	23.56	
