= Swimming at the 2015 Parapan American Games – Men's 50 metre freestyle S8 =

Men's 50 metre freestyle S8 at the 2015 Parapan American Games
- Venue: Toronto Pan Am Sports Centre
- Dates: 9 August 2015
- Competitors: 10 from 6 nations
- Winning time: 27.69

Medalists
1st place, gold medalist(s)		Zack McAllister	Canada
2nd place, silver medalist(s)		Armando Andrade	Mexico
3rd place, bronze medalist(s)		Christopher Sergeant	Canada

The men's S8 50 metres freestyle competition of the swimming events at the 2015 Parapan American Games was held on August 9, 2015 at the Toronto Pan Am Sports Centre.

== Schedule ==
All times are Eastern Standard Time (UTC-5).

Date	Time	Round
9 August	9:23	Heats
9 August	18:30	Final

== Results ==
=== Heats ===
==== Heat 1 ====
Rank	Lane	Name	Nationality	Time	Notes
1	4	Armando Andrade	Mexico	27.75	AR
2	3	Zach Zona	Canada	30.22	
3	5	Caio Amorim Muniz	Brazil	30.25	
4	6	Jesus Sanchez	Venezuela	33.38	
5	2	Roderick Sewell	Canada	35.60	

==== Heat 2 ====
Rank	Lane	Name	Nationality	Time	Notes
1	4	Zack McAllister	Canada	27.75	=AR
2	5	Christopher Sergeant	Canada	28.90	
3	6	Tom Miazga	United States	31.69	
4	3	Angel Buitian	Mexico	31.86	
5	2	Iñaki Basiloff	Argentina	33.20	

=== Final ===
Rank	Lane	Name	Nationality	Time	Notes
1st place, gold medalist(s)	4	Zack McAllister	Canada	27.69	AR
2nd place, silver medalist(s)	5	Armando Andrade	Mexico	27.81	
3rd place, bronze medalist(s)	3	Christopher Sergeant	Canada	28.88	
4	2	Caio Amorim Muniz	Brazil	29.98	
5	6	Zach Zona	Canada	30.22	
6	1	Angel Buitian	Mexico	31.17	
7	7	Tom Miazga	United States	31.44	
8	8	Iñaki Basiloff	Argentina	32.58	
