= Wheelchair basketball at the 2015 Parapan American Games =

- Venue: Ryerson Athletic Centre
- Dates: 8–15 August 2015
- Competitors: 190 from 11 nations

Wheelchair basketball event at the 2015 Parapan American Games was played from 8 to 15 August 2015 at the Ryerson Athletic Centre. It served as the qualifier for the 2016 Summer Paralympics.

== Participating nations ==
- Argentina (24)
- Brazil (24)
- Canada (24)
- Colombia (12)
- El Salvador (10)
- Guatemala (12)
- Mexico (24)
- Peru (12)
- Puerto Rico (12)
- United States (24)
- Venezuela (12)

== Men's tournament ==
Pool B
Team	Pld	W	L	PF	PA	PD	Pts	Qualification
Canada (CAN)	2	2	0	176	82	+94	4	Qualified for the quarterfinals
Argentina (ARG)	2	2	0	143	73	+70	4	Qualified for the quarterfinals
Mexico (MEX)	2	0	2	105	142	−37	2	Qualified for the quarterfinals
Venezuela (VEN)	2	0	2	50	177	−127	2	Qualified for the quarterfinals

== Women's tournament ==
Pool A
Team	Pld	W	L	PF	PA	PD	Pts	Qualification
Canada	3	3	0	240	108	+132	6	Qualified for the semifinals
Brazil	3	2	1	175	140	+35	5	Qualified for the semifinals
Mexico	3	1	2	143	171	−28	4	
Guatemala	3	0	3	78	217	−139	3	

Pool B
Team	Pld	W	L	PF	PA	PD	Pts	Qualification
United States	3	3	0	256	35	+221	6	Qualified for the semifinals
Argentina	3	2	1	117	151	−34	5	Qualified for the semifinals
Peru	3	1	2	100	147	−47	4	
El Salvador	3	0	3	60	200	−140	3	

== Medal summary ==
=== Medal table ===
* Host nation (Canada)

Rank	Nation	Gold	Silver	Bronze	Total
1	United States	2	0	0	2
2	Canada*	0	2	0	2
3	Argentina	0	0	1	1
3	Brazil	0	0	1	1
Totals (4 entries)		2	2	2	6

=== Medalists ===
Event	Gold	Silver	Bronze
Men	United States; Jacob Williams; Joshua Turek; Michael Paye; Brian Bell; Matt Scott; Jermell Pennie; Steve Serio; Nate Hinze; Trevon Jenifer; Jared Arambula; Aaron Gouge; John Gilbert	Canada; Deion Green; Peter Won; Bo Hedges; Vincent Dallaire; Liam Hickey; Adam Lancia; Abdi Dini; Chad Jassman; Nikola Goncin; Jonathan Vermette; Tyler Miller; David Eng	Argentina; Carlos Esteche; Mario Dominguez; Joel Gabas; Amado Perez; Gustavo Villafane; Fernando Ovejero; Maximiliano Ruggeri; Daniel Copa; Cristian Gomez; Adrian.J. Perez; Adolfo Berdun; Julio.C. Kowalczuk
Women	United States; Gail Gaeng; Megan Blunk; Darlene Hunter; Jennifer Chew; Desiree Miller; Jennifer Poist; Rebecca Murray; Rose Hollermann; Abigail Dunkin; Christina Schwab; Kimberly Champion; Mackenzie Soldan; Lawrence Johnson	Canada; Elaine Allard; Janet Mclachlan; Arinn Young; Cindy Ouellet; Rosalie Lalonde; Maude Jacques; Katie Harnock; Darda Sales; Tracey Ferguson; Jamey Jewells; Erica Gavel; Melanie Hawtin	Brazil; Ivanilde Silva; Lucicleia Costa; Monica Andrade Santos; Ana Rosa; Rosalia Ramos; Perla Assuncao; Jessica Santana; Geisiane Maria Brito; Lia Martins; Cintia De Carvalho; Paola Klokler; Vileide Almeida
