= Athletics at the 2015 Parapan American Games – Men's 400 metres T37 =

Athletics – Men's 400 metres T37 at the 2015 Parapan American Games
- Venue: CIBC Athletics Stadium
- Dates: August 12
- Competitors: 6 from 6 nations

Medalists
1st place, gold medalist(s)		Paulo Pereira	Brazil
2nd place, silver medalist(s)		Omar Monterola	Venezuela
3rd place, bronze medalist(s)		Mariano Dominguez	Argentina

The men's T37 400 metres competition of the athletics events at the 2015 Parapan American Games was held on August 12 at the CIBC Athletics Stadium.

== Records ==
Prior to this competition, the existing records were as follows:

World record	Andrey Vdovin (RUS)	50.91	Swansea, Great Britain	22 August 2014
Americas Record	Omar Monterola (VEN)	53.74	Guadalajara, Mexico	14 November 2011
Parapan Am Record	Omar Monterola (VEN)	53.74	Guadalajara, Mexico	14 November 2011

== Schedule ==
All times are Central Standard Time (UTC-6).

Date	Time	Round
12 August	17:34	Final

== Results ==
All times are shown in seconds.

KEY:	q	Fastest non-qualifiers	Q	Qualified	PR	Parapan American Games record	AR	Area record	NR	National record	PB	Personal best	SB	Seasonal best	DSQ	Disqualified	FS	False start

=== Final ===
Rank	Name	Nation	Time	Notes
1st place, gold medalist(s)	Paulo Pereira	Brazil	55.46	
2nd place, silver medalist(s)	Omar Monterola	Venezuela	56.07	
3rd place, bronze medalist(s)	Mariano Dominguez	Argentina	56.78	SB
4	Carlos Rodriguez	Mexico	58.36	PB
5	Ahkeel Whitehead	United States	58.52	SB
6	Oscar Fabian Riveros Amaya	Colombia	1:00.42	
