= Athletics at the 2015 Parapan American Games – Men's 4x100 metres T11-13 =

Athletics – Men's 4x100 metres T11-13 at the 2015 Parapan American Games
- Venue: CIBC Athletics Stadium
- Dates: August 14
- Competitors: 12 from 4 nations

Medalists
1st place, gold medalist(s)		Brazil	Brazil
2nd place, silver medalist(s)		Argentina	Argentina
3rd place, bronze medalist(s)		Colombia	Colombia

The men's 4x100 metres T11-13 relay competition of the athletics events at the 2015 Parapan American Games was held on August 14 at the CIBC Athletics Stadium.

== Records ==
Prior to this competition, the existing records were as follows:

World record	Spain (ESP)	42.46	Berlin, Germany	28 July 1994
Americas Record	United States (USA)	43.62	Lyon, France	23 July 2013

== Schedule ==
All times are Central Standard Time (UTC-6).

Date	Time	Round
14 August	20:35	Final

== Teams ==
Argentina (ARG)	Brazil (BRA)	Colombia (COL)	United States (USA)
Alexis Acosta (Guide: Ignacio Pignataro); Eduardo Aguilar (Guide: Juan Jasid); Alberto Cretton Salas (Guide: Bruno Zanacchi); Franco Bravo (Guide: Martin Sabio)	Lucas Prado (Guide: Justino Barbosa dos Santos); Gustavo Faria Araujo; Diogo Jeronimo da Silva; Felipe de Souza Gomes (Guide:Jorge Pereira Borges)	Jose Alexis Belizario Angulo (Guide: Geifer Rivas Palacios); Alexander Piamba Chilito (Guide: Jessi Chara Lasso); Delfo Jose Arce Orozco (Guide: Arley Barrios); Erwin Jadir Castillo Rodriguez	unknown

== Results ==
All times are shown in seconds.

KEY:	q	Fastest non-qualifiers	Q	Qualified	PR	Parapan American Games record	AR	Area record	NR	National record	PB	Personal best	SB	Seasonal best	DSQ	Disqualified	FS	False start

=== Final ===
Rank	Nation	Time	Notes
1st place, gold medalist(s)	Brazil (BRA)	43.31	AR
2nd place, silver medalist(s)	Argentina (ARG)	46.00	NR
3rd place, bronze medalist(s)	Colombia (COL)	46.10	NR
	United States (USA)	DNS	
