= Athletics at the 2015 Parapan American Games – Men's 400 metres T12 =

Athletics – Men's 400 metres T12 at the 2015 Parapan American Games
- Venue: CIBC Athletics Stadium
- Dates: August 10–11
- Competitors: 7 from 4 nations

Medalists
1st place, gold medalist(s)		Manuel Martinez	Mexico
2nd place, silver medalist(s)		Luis Galano	Cuba
3rd place, bronze medalist(s)		Valerys Larrondo	Cuba

The men's T12 400 metres competition of the athletics events at the 2015 Parapan American Games was held between August 10 and 11 at the CIBC Athletics Stadium. The defending Parapan American Games champion was Thierb Siqueira of Brazil.

== Records ==
Prior to this competition, the existing records were as follows:

World record	Mahmoud Khaldi (TUN)	48.52	London, Great Britain	September 6, 2012
Americas Record	Jorge Benjamin Gonzalez Sauceda (MEX)	49.21	Grosseto, Italy	June 13, 2015
Parapan American Games	Pedro Cezar de Sliva Moraes (BRA)	50.43	Rio de Janeiro, Brazil	August 16, 2007

=== Records broken ===
Parapan Am record	Benjamin Gonzalez (MEX)	49.62	Toronto, Canada	10 August 2015

== Schedule ==
All times are Central Standard Time (UTC-6).

Date	Time	Round
10 August	18:02	Semifinal 1
10 August	18:08	Semifinal 2
11 August	19:08	Final

== Results ==
All times are shown in seconds.

KEY:	q	Fastest non-qualifiers	Q	Qualified	PR	Parapan American Games record	NR	National record	PB	Personal best	SB	Seasonal best	DSQ	Disqualified	FS	False start	DNF	Did not finish

=== Semifinals ===
The fastest from each heat and next two overall fastest qualified for the final.

==== Semifinal 1 ====
Rank	Name	Nation	Time	Notes
1	Manuel Martinez	Mexico	49.85	Q, PR
2	Luis Galano	Cuba	51.09	q
3	German Angarita Otero	Colombia	DNF	

==== Semifinal 2 ====
Rank	Name	Nation	Time	Notes
1	Benjamin Gonzalez	Mexico	49.62	Q, PR
2	Valerys Larrondo	Cuba	51.40	q
3	Diogo Jeronimo da Silva	Brazil	52.80	
	Alexander Piamba Chilto (Guide: Jessi Chara Lasso	Colombia	DSQ	FS

=== Final ===
Rank	Name	Nation	Time	Notes
1st place, gold medalist(s)	Manuel Martinez	Mexico	49.94	
2nd place, silver medalist(s)	Luis Galano	Cuba	50.86	
3rd place, bronze medalist(s)	Valerys Larrondo	Cuba	51.04	
	Benjamin Gonzalez	Mexico	DNS	
