= Athletics at the 2015 Parapan American Games – Women's 100 metres T36 =

Athletics – Women's 100 metres T36 at the 2015 Parapan American Games
- Venue: CIBC Athletics Stadium
- Dates: August 14
- Competitors: 8 from 5 nations

Medalists
1st place, gold medalist(s)		Yanina Martinez	Argentina
2nd place, silver medalist(s)		Tascitha Oliveira Cruz	Brazil
3rd place, bronze medalist(s)		Martha Liliana Hernandez Florian	Colombia

The women's T36 100 metres competition of the athletics events at the 2015 Parapan American Games was held on August 14 at the CIBC Athletics Stadium. The defending Parapan American Games champion was Nadía Schaus of Argentina.

== Records ==
Prior to this competition, the existing records were as follows:

World record	Fang Wang (CHN)	13.82	Beijing, China	September 15, 2008
Americas Record	Tascitha Oliveira Cruz (BRA)	14.66	São Paulo, Brazil	April 23, 2015

== Schedule ==
All times are Central Standard Time (UTC-6).

Date	Time	Round
14 August	15:32	Final

== Results ==
All times are shown in seconds.

KEY:	q	Fastest non-qualifiers	Q	Qualified	PR	Parapan American Games record	AR	Area record	NR	National record	PB	Personal best	SB	Seasonal best	DSQ	Disqualified	FS	False start

=== Final ===
Wind: +0.3 m/s

Rank	Name	Nation	Time	Notes
1st place, gold medalist(s)	Yanina Martinez	Argentina	14.31	AR
2nd place, silver medalist(s)	Tascitha Oliveira Cruz	Brazil	14.95	
3rd place, bronze medalist(s)	Martha Liliana Hernandez Florian	Colombia	15.06	PB
4	Daniela Rodriguez Angulo	Colombia	15.66	
5	Sandra Fonseca	Mexico	16.17	PB
6	Allysa Seely	United States	16.37	
7	Marcela Carabajal	Argentina	16.42	PB
8	Milagros Nuñez	Argentina	18.00	
