= Athletics at the 2015 Parapan American Games – Women's 100 metres T47 =

Athletics – Women's 100 metres T47 at the 2015 Parapan American Games
- Venue: CIBC Athletics Stadium
- Dates: August 11–12
- Competitors: 11 from 6 nations

Medalists
1st place, gold medalist(s)		Yunidis Castillo	Cuba
2nd place, silver medalist(s)		Teresinha de Jesus Correia dos Santos	Brazil
3rd place, bronze medalist(s)		Sheila Finder	Brazil

The women's T47 (including T45 and T46 athletes) 100 metres competition of the athletics events at the 2015 Parapan American Games was held between August 11 and 12 at the CIBC Athletics Stadium.

== Records ==
Prior to this competition, the existing records were as follows:

=== T45 ===
World record	G. Cole (CAN)	14.00	Arnhem, Netherlands	June 2, 1980
Americas record	G. Cole (CAN)	14.00	Arnhem, Netherlands	June 2, 1980

=== T46, T47 ===
World record	Yunidis Castillo (CUB)	11.95	London, Great Britain	September 4, 2012
Americas record	Yunidis Castillo (CUB)	11.95	London, Great Britain	September 4, 2012
Parapan record	Yunidis Castillo (CUB)	12.08	Guadalajara, Mexico	August 16, 2007

== Schedule ==
All times are Central Standard Time (UTC-6).

Date	Time	Round
11 August	18:28	Semifinal 1
11 August	18:34	Semifinal 2
12 August	18:53	Final

== Results ==
All times are shown in seconds.

KEY:	q	Fastest non-qualifiers	Q	Qualified	PR	Parapan American Games record	AR	Area record	NR	National record	PB	Personal best	SB	Seasonal best	DSQ	Disqualified	FS	False start

All athletes are classified as T47 unless indicated.

=== Semifinals ===
The fastest three from each heat and next two overall fastest qualified for the final.

==== Semifinal 1 ====
Wind: +1.9 m/s

Rank	Name	Nation	Time	Notes
1	Sheila Finder	Brazil	12.97	Q, PB
2	Teresinha de Jesus Correia dos Santos	Brazil	13.04	Q, T46
3	Jasmine Rowe	United States	13.43	Q, PB, T46
4	Margarita Vega	Argentina	14.24	q
5	Antonella Urso	Argentina	13.54	q, PB, T46
6	Mariel Betancourt	Venezuela	14.56	PB, T46

==== Semifinal 2 ====
Wind: +2.9 m/s

Rank	Name	Nation	Time	Notes
1	Yunidis Castillo	Cuba	12.41	Q
2	Amy Watt	United States	13.27	Q
3	Amanda Cerna Gamboa	United States	13.70	Q
	Megan Absten	United States	DQS	FS
	Aldana Ibañez	Argentina	DQS	FS

=== Final ===
Wind: +2.2 m/s

Rank	Name	Nation	Time	Notes
1st place, gold medalist(s)	Yunidis Castillo	Cuba	12.49	T46
2nd place, silver medalist(s)	Teresinha de Jesus Correia dos Santos	Brazil	12.92	T46
3rd place, bronze medalist(s)	Sheila Finder	Brazil	12.99	
4	Amy Watt	United States	13.22	
5	Jasmine Rowe	United States	13.25	T46
6	Amanda Cerna Gamboa	Chile	13.87	
7	Margarita Vega	Argentina	14.36	
8	Antonella Urso	Argentina	14.59	
