= Swimming at the 2015 Parapan American Games – Men's 50 metre freestyle S3 =

Men's 50 metre freestyle S3 at the 2015 Parapan American Games
- Venue: Toronto Pan Am Sports Centre
- Dates: 8 August 2015
- Competitors: 4 from 3 nations
- Winning time: 59.68

Medalists
1st place, gold medalist(s)		Cristopher Tronco	Mexico
2nd place, silver medalist(s)		Luis Burgos	Mexico
3rd place, bronze medalist(s)		Fredy Diaz	Colombia

The men's S3 50 metres freestyle competition of the swimming events at the 2015 Parapan American Games was held on August 8, 2015 at the Toronto Pan Am Sports Centre.

== Schedule ==
All times are Eastern Standard Time (UTC-5).

Date	Time	Round
8 August	9:50	Final

== Results ==
=== Final ===
Rank	Lane	Name	Nationality	Time	Notes
1st place, gold medalist(s)	4	Cristopher Tronco	Mexico	59.68	
2nd place, silver medalist(s)	5	Luis Burgos	Mexico	1:03.45	
3rd place, bronze medalist(s)	6	Fredy Diaz	Colombia	1:15.61	
4	3	Curtis Lovejoy	United States	1:15.85	
