= Athletics at the 2015 Parapan American Games – Men's 400 metres T36 =

Athletics – Men's 400 metres T36 at the 2015 Parapan American Games
- Venue: CIBC Athletics Stadium
- Dates: August 14
- Competitors: 5 from 4 nations

Medalists
1st place, gold medalist(s)		Juan Moreno Marquez	Colombia
2nd place, silver medalist(s)		Enrique Rotondo	Argentina
3rd place, bronze medalist(s)		Gabriel de Jesus Cuadra Holmann	Nicaragua

The men's T36 400 metres competition of the athletics events at the 2015 Parapan American Games was held on August 14 at the CIBC Athletics Stadium. The defending Parapan American Games champion was Tommy Chasanoff of the United States.

== Records ==
Prior to this competition, the existing records were as follows:

World record	Evgenii Shvetcov (RUS)	53.31	London, Great Britain	September 4, 2012
Americas Record	Juan Moreno Marquez (COL)	58.05	Medellín, Colombia	November 22, 2014
Parapan Am Record	Tommy Chasanoff (USA)	1:01.83	Guadalajara, Mexico	18 November 2011

=== Records broken ===
Americas Record	Juan Moreno Marquez (COL)	57.62	Toronto, Canada	14 August 2015
Parapan Am record	Juan Moreno Marquez (COL)	57.62	Toronto, Canada	14 August 2015

== Schedule ==
All times are Central Standard Time (UTC-6).

Date	Time	Round
14 August	19:14	Final

== Results ==
All times are shown in seconds.

KEY:	q	Fastest non-qualifiers	Q	Qualified	PR	Parapan American Games record	NR	National record	PB	Personal best	SB	Seasonal best	DSQ	Disqualified	FS	False start	DNF	Did not finish

=== Final ===
Rank	Name	Nation	Time	Notes
1st place, gold medalist(s)	Juan Moreno Marquez	Colombia	57.62	AR
2nd place, silver medalist(s)	Enrique Eotondo	Argentina	59.62	PB
3rd place, bronze medalist(s)	Gabriel de Jesus Cuadra Holmann	Nicaragua	59.96	PB
4	Alexis Alvarez	Argentina	1:01.31	PB
5	Yonathan Martinez Luna	Mexico	1:03.45	PB
