= Athletics at the 2015 Parapan American Games – Men's 100 metres T47 =

Athletics – Men's 100 metres T47 at the 2015 Parapan American Games
- Venue: CIBC Athletics Stadium
- Dates: August 10
- Competitors: 14 from 8 nations

Medalists
1st place, gold medalist(s)		Petrucio Ferreira dos Santos	Brazil
2nd place, silver medalist(s)		Raciel Gonzalez	Cuba
3rd place, bronze medalist(s)		Yohansson do Nascimento Ferreira	Brazil

The men's T47 (including T45 and T46 athletes) 100 metres competition of the athletics events at the 2015 Parapan American Games was held on August 10 at the CIBC Athletics Stadium. The defending T46 Parapan American Games champion was Yohansson Nascimento of Brazil.

== Records ==
Prior to this competition, the existing records were as follows:

=== T45 ===
World record	Yohansson Nascimento (BRA)	10.94	London, Great Britain	6 September 2012
Americas Record	Yohansson Nascimento (BRA)	10.94	London, Great Britain	6 September 2012
Parapan Am Record	Yohansson Nascimento (BRA)	11.08	Guadalajara, Mexico	15 November 2011

=== T46/T47 ===
World record	Ajibola Adeoye (NGR)	10.72	Barcelona, Spain	6 September 1992
Americas Record	Petrucio Ferreira dos Santos (BRA)	10.81	Fortaleza, Brazil	15 November 2014
Parapan Am Record	Raciel Gonzalez Isidoria (CUB)	11.03	Guadalajara, Mexico	14 November 2011

=== Broken Records ===
==== T46/T47 ====
Americas Record	Petrucio Ferreira dos Santos (BRA)	10.77	Toronto, Canada	10 August 2015
Parapan Am Record	Petrucio Ferreira dos Santos (BRA)	10.77	Toronto, Canada	10 August 2015

== Schedule ==
All times are Central Standard Time (UTC-6).

Date	Time	Round
10 August	17:02	Semifinal 1
10 August	17:07	Semifinal 2
10 August	20:32	Final

== Results ==
Athletes are classified T47 unless indicated. All times are shown in seconds.

KEY:	q	Fastest non-qualifiers	Q	Qualified	PR	Parapan American Games record	NR	National record	PB	Personal best	SB	Seasonal best	DSQ	Disqualified	FS	False start

=== Semifinals ===
The fastest three from each heat and next two overall fastest qualified for the final.

==== Semifinal 1 ====
Wind +0.7 m/s

Rank	Name	Nation	Time	Notes
1	Petrucio Ferreira dos Santos	Brazil	11.03	Q, =PR
2	Jesul Viveros	Mexico	11.35	Q
3	Braian Villarreal	Argentina	11.64	Q, T46
4	Jack Briggs	United States	11.67	q
5	Ever Caceres	Argentina	11.92	
6	Renny Pacheco	Venezuela	11.92	
7	Wemerson de la Rosa	Dominican Republic	12.00	T46

==== Semifinal 2 ====
Wind +0.2 m/s

Rank	Name	Nation	Time	Notes
1	Raciel Gonzalez	Cuba	10.95	Q, PR, T46
2	Yohansson do Nascimento Ferreira	Brazil	11.17	Q, T46
3	Dion Townsend-Roberts	United States	11.38	Q, PB, T46
4	Samuel Colmenares	Venezuela	11.42	q, PB
5	Matias Pubebla	Argentina	11.87	PB, T46
6	Tevaughn Thomas	Jamaica	12.00	PB, T46
7	Raul Perez	Guatemala	13.50	T45

=== Final ===
Wind +0.5 m/s

Rank	Name	Nation	Time	Notes
1st place, gold medalist(s)	Petrucio Ferreira dos Santos	Brazil	10.77	AR
2nd place, silver medalist(s)	Raciel Gonzalez	Cuba	11.00	T46
3rd place, bronze medalist(s)	Yohansson do Nascimento Ferreira	Brazil	11.12	SB, T46
4	Samuel Colmenares	Venezuela	11.42	
5	Dion Townsend-Roberts	United States	11.42	T46
6	Jesul Viveros	Mexico	11.45	
7	Braian Villarreal	Argentina	11.59	T46
8	Jack Briggs	United States	11.73	
