= Athletics at the 2015 Parapan American Games – Men's 100 metres T35 =

Athletics – Men's 100 metres T35 at the 2015 Parapan American Games
- Venue: CIBC Athletics Stadium
- Dates: August 10
- Competitors: 6 from 4 nations

Medalists
| 1st place, gold medalist(s) | | Hernan Barreto | Argentina |
| 2nd place, silver medalist(s) | | Ayden Jent | United States |
| 3rd place, bronze medalist(s) | | Nicolas Aravena | Argentina |

The men's T35 100 metres competition of the athletics events at the 2015 Parapan American Games was held on August 10 at the CIBC Athletics Stadium. The defending Parapan American Games champion was Hernan Barreto of Argentina.

== Records ==
Prior to this competition, the existing world and Americas records were as follows:

| World record | Sen Yang (CHN) | 12.29 | Beijing, China | 13 September 2008 |
| Americas Record | Hernan Barreto (ARG) | 12.85 | Berlin, Germany | 19 June 2015 |
| Parapan Am Record | Hernan Barreto (ARG) | 13.26 | Guadalajara, Mexico | 14 November 2011 |

=== Records Broken ===
| Americas Record | Hernan Barreto (ARG) | 12.82 | Toronto, Canada | 10 August 2015 |
| Parapan Am Record | Hernan Barreto (ARG) | 12.82 | Toronto, Canada | 10 August 2015 |

== Schedule ==
All times are Central Standard Time (UTC-6).

| Date | Time | Round |
|---|---|---|
| 10 August | 19:03 | Final |

== Results ==
All times are shown in seconds.

| KEY: | q | Fastest non-qualifiers | Q | Qualified | PR | Parapan American Games record | AR | Area Record | NR | National record | PB | Personal best | SB | Seasonal best | DSQ | Disqualified | FS | False start |

=== Final ===
Wind 0.0 m/s

| Rank | Name | Nation | Time | Notes |
|---|---|---|---|---|
| 1st place, gold medalist(s) | Hernan Barreto | Argentina | 12.82 | AR |
| 2nd place, silver medalist(s) | Ayden Jent | United States | 13.28 | PB |
| 3rd place, bronze medalist(s) | Nicolas Aravena | Argentina | 13.34 | |
| 4 | Diego Gonzalez | Argentina | 13.71 | |
| 5 | Nicolas Pino Maureira | Chile | 14.29 | PB |
| 6 | Eduardo Verdin | Mexico | 14.72 | |
