= Athletics at the 2015 Parapan American Games – Men's 100 metres T54 =

Athletics – Men's 100 metres T54 at the 2015 Parapan American Games
- Venue: CIBC Athletics Stadium
- Dates: August 10
- Competitors: 8 from 6 nations

Medalists
1st place, gold medalist(s)		Sairo Moises Fernandez Lopez	Colombia
2nd place, silver medalist(s)		Juan Cervantes	Mexico
3rd place, bronze medalist(s)		Javier Rojas Diaz	Colombia

The men's T54 100 metres competition of the athletics events at the 2015 Parapan American Games was held on August 10 at the CIBC Athletics Stadium. The defending Parapan American Games champion was Erik Hightower of the United States of America.

== Records ==
Prior to this competition, the existing records were as follows:

World record	Leo Pekka Tahti (FIN)	13.63	London, Great Britain	1 September 2015
Americas Record	Erik Hightower (USA)	14.14	St Paul, Minnesota, United States of America	20 June 2015
Parapan Am Record	Juan Valladares (VEN)	15.06	Rio de Janeiro, Brazil	18 August 2007

== Schedule ==
All times are Central Standard Time (UTC-6).

Date	Time	Round
10 August	19:35	Final

== Results ==
All times are shown in seconds.

KEY:	q	Fastest non-qualifiers	Q	Qualified	PR	Parapan American Games record	AR	Area record	NR	National record	PB	Personal best	SB	Seasonal best	DSQ	Disqualified	FS	False start

=== Final ===
Wind -1.0 m/s

Rank	Name	Nation	Time	Notes
1st place, gold medalist(s)	Sairo Moises Fernandez Lopez	Colombia	15.19	
2nd place, silver medalist(s)	Juan Cervantez	Mexico	15.19	
3rd place, bronze medalist(s)	Javier Rojas Diaz	Colombia	16.10	
4	Mark Braun	United States	16.32	
5	Isaiah Christophe	Canada	16.33	
6	Juan Valladares	Venezuela	17.62	
7	Erik Hightower	United States	18.93	
8	Facundo Rodriguez	Argentina	22.01	
