= Athletics at the 2015 Parapan American Games – Men's 400 metres T38 =

Athletics – Men's 400 metres T38 at the 2015 Parapan American Games
- Venue: CIBC Athletics Stadium
- Dates: August 19
- Competitors: 7 from 4 nations

Medalists
1st place, gold medalist(s)		Dixon de Jesus Hooker Velasquez	Colombia
2nd place, silver medalist(s)		Weiner Javier Diaz Mosquera	Colombia
3rd place, bronze medalist(s)		Carlos Castillo	Nicaragua

The men's T38 400 metres competition of the athletics events at the 2015 Parapan American Games was held on August 11 at the CIBC Athletics Stadium. The defending Parapan American Games champion was Omar Monterola of Venezuela.

== Records ==
Prior to this competition, the existing records were as follows:

World record	Mohamed Farhat Chida (TUN)	49.33	Christchurch, New Zealand	29 January 2011
Americas Record	Paulo Pereira (BRA)	54.53	Christchurch, New Zealand	29 January 2011
Parapan Am Record	Edson Pinheiro (BRA)	55.51	Guadalajara, Mexico	18 November 2011

=== Records Broken ===
Americas record	Dixon de Jesus Hooker Velasquez (COL)	54.36	Toronto, Canada	10 August 2015
Parapan Am record	Dixon de Jesus Hooker Velasquez (COL)	54.36	Toronto, Canada	10 August 2015

== Schedule ==
All times are Central Standard Time (UTC-6).

Date	Time	Round
10 August	17:55	Final

== Results ==
All times are shown in seconds.

KEY:	q	Fastest non-qualifiers	Q	Qualified	PR	Parapan American Games record	AR	Area record	NR	National record	PB	Personal best	SB	Seasonal best	DSQ	Disqualified	FS	False start

=== Final ===
Rank	Name	Nation	Time	Notes
1st place, gold medalist(s)	Dixon de Jesus Hooker Velasquez	Colombia	54.36	AR
2nd place, silver medalist(s)	Weiner Javier Diaz Mosquera	Colombia	55.91	
3rd place, bronze medalist(s)	Carlos Castillo	Nicaragua	59.02	
4	Luis Alejandro Prado Guerrero	Nicaragua	59.65	PB
5	Juan Carlos Medina Valencia	Colombia	1:00.52	
6	Carlos Velasquez	Honduras	1:03.72	
	Jesus Cortes Roman	Mexico	DSQ	R 18.5
8	Dalmiro Geliz	Colombia	13.70	
