= Athletics at the 2015 Parapan American Games – Women's 200 metres T11 =

Athletics – Women's 200 metres T11 at the 2015 Parapan American Games
- Venue: CIBC Athletics Stadium
- Dates: August 12–14
- Competitors: 5 from 3 nations

Medalists
1st place, gold medalist(s)		Terezinha Guilhermina (Guide: Guilherme Soares de Santana)	Brazil
2nd place, silver medalist(s)		Thalita Simplicio da Silva (Guide: Felipe Veloso da Silva)	Brazil
3rd place, bronze medalist(s)		Not awarded	

The women's T11 200 metres competition of the athletics events at the 2015 Parapan American Games was held between August 12 and 14 at the CIBC Athletics Stadium. The defending Parapan American Games champion was Terezinha Guilhermina of Brazil.

== Records ==
Prior to this competition, the existing records were as follows:

World record	Terezinha Guilhermina (BRA)	24.67	Mexico City, Mexico	April 20, 2012
Americas record	Terezinha Guilhermina (BRA)	24.67	Mexico City, Mexico	April 20, 2012

== Schedule ==
All times are Central Standard Time (UTC-6).

Date	Time	Round
12 August	15:42	Semifinal 1
12 August	15:48	Semifinal 2
11 August	17:18	Final

== Results ==
All times are shown in seconds.

KEY:	q	Fastest non-qualifiers	Q	Qualified	PR	Parapan American Games record	AR	Area record	NR	National record	PB	Personal best	SB	Seasonal best	DSQ	Disqualified	FS	False start

=== Semifinals ===
The fastest from each heat and next two overall fastest qualified for the final.

==== Semifinal 1 ====
Wind: +4.0 m/s

Rank	Name	Nation	Time	Notes
1	Thalita Simplicio da Silva (Guide: Felipe Veloso da Silva	Brazil	25.29	Q
2	Jhulia dos Santos (Guide: Fabio Dias de Oliveira Silva)	Brazil	26.12	q

==== Semifinal 2 ====
Wind: +2.8 m/s

Rank	Name	Nation	Time	Notes
1	Terezinha Guilhermina (Guide: Guilherme Soares de Santana	Brazil	24.99	Q
2	Diana Coraza (Guide: Jesús Bramasco)	Mexico	27.21	q
3	Irene Suarez (Guide: Richard Torrealba)	Venezuela	27.95	

=== Final ===
Wind: -0.7 m/s

Rank	Name	Nation	Time	Notes
1st place, gold medalist(s)	Terezinha Guilhermina (Guide: Guilherme Soares de Santana)	Brazil	24.89	PR
2nd place, silver medalist(s)	Thalita Simplicio da Silva (Guide: Felipe Veloso da Silva	Brazil	25.78	
	Diana Coraza (Guide: Jesús Bramasco)	Mexico	DNF	
	Jhulia dos Santos (Guide: Fabio Dias de Oliveira Silva)	Brazil	DSQ	FS
