= Cycling at the 2015 Parapan American Games =

- Venue: Ontario Place West Channel
- Dates: August 8 - 13

Cycling was held at the 2015 Parapan American Games between the 9–10 August at the Ontario Place West Channel in Toronto.

== Schedule ==
=== 8 August ===
Time	Event
9:05	Mixed Road Race B
9:07	Men's Road Race H3-5
9:07	Mixed Road Race H1-2M/H1-5W
9:07	Mixed Road Race T1-2
11:15	Men's Road Race C4-5
11:17	Men's Road Race C1-3
11:17	Women's Road Race C1-5

=== 10 August ===
Time	Event
14:05	Mixed Individual Pursuit B Qualification
14:50	Women's 500m Time Trial C1-5 Finals
15:15	Men's 1km Time Trial C1-5 Finals
16:35	Mixed Individual Pursuit B Finals

=== 11 August ===
Time	Event
14:05	Women's Individual Pursuit C1-5
14:40	Men's Individual Pursuit C1-3 Qualification
15:15	Men's Individual Pursuit C4-5 Qualification
16:00	Mixed Time Trial B Finals
16:40	Women's Individual Pursuit C1-5 Finals
16:55	Men's Individual Pursuit C1-3 Finals
17:10	Men's Individual Pursuit C4-5 Finals

=== 13 August ===
Time	Event
11:05	Mixed Time Trial B
11:05	Mixed Time Trial C1-5
12:15	Mixed Time Trial H1-5
12:15	Mixed Time Trial T1-2

== Medal Standings ==
=== Road ===
==== Medal table ====
Rank	Nation	Gold	Silver	Bronze	Total
1	United States	5	5	2	12
2	Canada	2	3	6	11
3	Colombia	2	2	1	5
4	Brazil	2	0	0	2
5	Argentina	0	1	1	2
6	Dominican Republic	0	0	1	1

==== Medalists ====
Class	Gold	Silver	Bronze
Men's Road Race C1-3	Joseph Berenyi (USA)	Esneider Muñoz (COL)	Alvaro Galvis (COL)
Men's Road Race C4-5	Lauro Chaman (BRA)	Siego Dueñas (COL)	Rodny Minier (DOM)
Men's Road Race H3-5	Mark Ledo (CAN)	William Lachenauer (USA)	Charles Moreau (CAN)
Mixed Road Race B	Nelson Serna; Sebastian Durango (COL)	Daniel Chalifour; Alexandre Cloutier (CAN)	Raul Villalba; Ezequiel Romero (ARG)
Mixed Time Trial B	Daniel Chalifour; Alexandre Cloutier (CAN)	Robbi Weldon; Audrey Lemieux (CAN)	Shawna Ryan; Joanie Caron (CAN)
Women's Road Race C1-5	Samantha Heinrich (USA)	Mariela Delgado (ARG)	Nicole Clermont (CAN)
Mixed Time Trial C1-5	Lauro Chaman (BRA)	Joseph Berenyl (USA)	Allison Jones (USA)
Mixed Road Race H1-2M/H1-5W	William Groulx (USA)	Brian Sheridan (USA)	Robert Labbé (CAN)
Mixed Time Trial H1-5	Brian Sheridan (USA)	William Groulx (USA)	Charles Moreau (CAN)
Mixed Road Race T1-2	Nestor Ayala (COL)	Ryan Boyle (USA)	Louis-Albert Corriveau-Jolin (CAN)
Mixed Time Trial T1-2	Jill Walsh (USA)	Shelley Gautier (CAN)	Ryan Boyle (USA)

=== Track ===
==== Medal table ====
Rank	Nation	Gold	Silver	Bronze	Total
1	United States	2	2	3	7
2	Canada	2	1	0	3
3	Argentina	2	0	1	3
4	Colombia	1	3	2	6
5	Brazil	0	1	1	2

==== Medalists ====
Class	Gold	Silver	Bronze
Men's Individual Pursuit C1-3	Joseph Berenyi (USA)	Michael Sametz (CAN)	Esneider Muñoz (COL)
Men's Individual Pursuit C4-5	Diego Dueñas (COL)	Lauro Chaman (BRA)	Edwin Matiz (COL)
Men's 1km Time Trial C1-5	Joseph Berenyi (USA)	Edwin Matiz (COL)	Justin Widhalm (USA)
Women's Individual Pursuit C1-5	Mariela Delgado (ARG)	Samantha Heinrich (USA)	Shawn Morelli (USA)
Women's 500m Time Trial C1-5	Mariela Delgado (ARG)	Jennifer Schuble (USA)	Allison Jones (USA)
Mixed Time Trial B	Daniel Chalifour; Alexandre Cloutier (CAN)	Nelson Serna; Sebastian Durango (COL)	Raul Villalba; Ezequiel Romero (ARG)
Mixed Individual Pursuit B	Daniel Chalifour; Alexandre Cloutier (CAN)	Nelson Serna; Sebastian Durango (COL)	Luciano da Roza; Edson de Rezende (BRA)
