= Athletics at the 2015 Parapan American Games – Men's 100 metres T36 =

Athletics – Men's 100 metres T36 at the 2015 Parapan American Games
- Venue: CIBC Athletics Stadium
- Dates: August 10
- Competitors: 6 from 4 nations

Medalists
1st place, gold medalist(s)		Juan Moreno Marquez	Colombia
2nd place, silver medalist(s)		Enrique Rotondo	Argentina
3rd place, bronze medalist(s)		Rodrigo Parreira da Silva	Brazil

The men's T36 100 metres competition of the athletics events at the 2015 Parapan American Games was held on August 10 at the CIBC Athletics Stadium. The defending Parapan American Games champion was José Florez of Colombia.

== Records ==
Prior to this competition, the existing records were as follows:

World record	Evgenii Shvetcov (RUS)	11.90	Lyon, France	22 July 2013
Americas Record	Enrique Rotondo (ARG)	12.76	Fortaleza, Brazil	15 November 2014
Parapan Am Record	Jose Florez (COL)	13.05	Guadalajara, Mexico	14 November 2011

=== Broken Records ===
Americas Record	Juan Moreno Marquez (COL)	12.57	Toronto, Canada	10 August 2015
Parapan Am Record	Juan Moreno Marquez (COL)	12.57	Toronto, Canada	10 August 2015

== Schedule ==
All times are Central Standard Time (UTC-6).

Date	Time	Round
11 August	19:02	Final

== Results ==
All times are shown in seconds.

KEY:	q	Fastest non-qualifiers	Q	Qualified	PR	Parapan American Games record	AR	Area record	NR	National record	PB	Personal best	SB	Seasonal best	DSQ	Disqualified	FS	False start

=== Final ===
Wind +0.1 m/s

Rank	Name	Nation	Time	Notes
1st place, gold medalist(s)	Juan Moreno Marquez	Colombia	12.57	AR
2nd place, silver medalist(s)	Enrique Rotondo	Argentina	12.73	
3rd place, bronze medalist(s)	Rodrigo Parreira da Silva	Brazil	12.78	
4	Gabriel de Jesus Parreira da Silva	Nicaragua	13.22	PB
5	José Florez	Colombia	13.37	
6	Alexis Alvarez	Argentina	13.55	PB
