= Athletics at the 2015 Parapan American Games – Women's 100 metres T12 =

Athletics – Women's 100 metres T12 at the 2015 Parapan American Games
- Venue: CIBC Athletics Stadium
- Dates: August 10–11
- Competitors: 5 from 4 nations

Medalists
1st place, gold medalist(s)		Omara Durand	Cuba
2nd place, silver medalist(s)		Alice de Oliveira Correa (Guide: Diogo Cardoso da Silva)	Brazil
3rd place, bronze medalist(s)		Greilyz Villaroel (Guide: Amilcar Zambrano Peña)	Venezuela

The women's T12 100 metres competition of the athletics events at the 2015 Parapan American Games was held between August 10 and 11 at the CIBC Athletics Stadium. The defending Parapan American Games champion was Daineris Mijans of Cuba.

== Records ==
Prior to this competition, the existing records were as follows:

World record	Guohus Zhou (CHN)	11.91	London, Great Britain	September 1, 2012
Americas record	Sirlene Guilhermino (BRA)	12.37	Tunis, Tunisia	June 14, 2008
Parapan record	Omara Durand (CUB)	12.41	Rio de Janeiro, Brazil	August 16, 2007

== Schedule ==
All times are Central Standard Time (UTC-6).

Date	Time	Round
10 August	15:55	Semifinal 1
10 August	16:02	Semifinal 2
11 August	17:18	Final

== Results ==
All times are shown in seconds.

KEY:	q	Fastest non-qualifiers	Q	Qualified	PR	Parapan American Games record	AR	Area record	NR	National record	PB	Personal best	SB	Seasonal best	DSQ	Disqualified	FS	False start

=== Semifinals ===
The fastest from each heat and next two overall fastest qualified for the final.

==== Semifinal 1 ====
Wind: +1.3 m/s

Rank	Name	Nation	Time	Notes
1	Alice de Oliveira Correa (Guide: Diogo Cardoso da Silva	Brazil	12.44	Q, PB
2	Daineris Mijans	Cuba	13.47	q
3	Yohana Aguilar (Guide: Marcos Seitz	Argentina	13.54	PB

==== Semifinal 2 ====
Wind: +1.7 m/s

Rank	Name	Nation	Time	Notes
1	Omara Durand	Cuba	11.65	Q, WR, AR, PR
2	Greilyz Villaroel (Guide: Amilcar Zambrano Peña)	Venezuela	12.82	q, PB

=== Final ===
Wind: +3.7 m/s

Rank	Name	Nation	Time	Notes
1st place, gold medalist(s)	Omara Durand	Cuba	11.64	
2nd place, silver medalist(s)	Alice de Oliveira Correa (Guide: Diogo Cardoso da Silva	Brazil	12.19	
3rd place, bronze medalist(s)	Greilyz Villaroel (Guide: Amilcar Zambrano Peña)	Venezuela	12.79	
4	Daineris Mijans	Cuba	13.68	
