= Swimming at the 2015 Parapan American Games – Men's 50 metre freestyle S5 =

Men's 50 metre freestyle S5 at the 2015 Parapan American Games
- Venue: Toronto Pan Am Sports Centre
- Dates: 12 August 2015
- Competitors: 10 from 4 nations
- Winning time: 32.41

Medalists
1st place, gold medalist(s)		Daniel Dias	Brazil
2nd place, silver medalist(s)		Clodoaldo Da Silva	Brazil
3rd place, bronze medalist(s)		Edgar Pineda	Mexico

The men's S5 50 metres freestyle competition of the swimming events at the 2015 Parapan American Games was held on August 12, 2015, at the Toronto Pan Am Sports Centre.

== Schedule ==
All times are Eastern Standard Time (UTC-5).

Date	Time	Round
12 August	9:31	Heats
12 August	17:59	Final

== Results ==
=== Heats ===
==== Heat 1 ====
Rank	Lane	Name	Nationality	Time	Notes
1	4	Clodoaldo Da Silva	Brazil	35.02	
2	5	Edgar Pineda	Mexico	39.66	
3	3	Danial Murphy	Canada	43.22	
4	6	Gerardo Castro	Mexico	48.61	
5	2	Sebastian Ortiz	Puerto Rico	1:12.24	

==== Heat 2 ====
Rank	Lane	Name	Nationality	Time	Notes
1	4	Daniel Dias	Brazil	34.97	
2	5	Diego Lopez	Mexico	39.94	
3	3	Andrew Cooke	Canada	42.82	
4	6	Francisco Avelino	Brazil	43.99	
5	2	Jonathan Dielman	Canada	1:06.01	

=== Final ===
Rank	Lane	Name	Nationality	Time	Notes
1st place, gold medalist(s)	4	Daniel Dias	Brazil	32.41	PR
2nd place, silver medalist(s)	5	Clodoaldo Da Silva	Brazil	34.94	
3rd place, bronze medalist(s)	3	Edgar Pineda	Mexico	38.52	
4	6	Diego Lopez	Mexico	39.57	
5	7	Danial Murphy	Canada	42.15	
6	2	Andrew Cooke	Canada	42.30	
7	1	Francisco Avelino	Brazil	44.08	
8	8	Gerardo Castro	Mexico	46.15	
