= El Salvador at the 2015 Parapan American Games =

- IOC code: ESA
- NOC: Comite Paralímpico de El Salvador
- Website: https://www.paralympic.org/el-salvador

in Toronto 7–15 August 2015
- Competitors: 22 in 6 sports
- Medals: Gold 0 Silver 0 Bronze 0 Total 0

Parapan American Games appearances
- 1999; 2003; 2007; 2011; 2015; 2019; 2023

El Salvador participated in the 2015 Parapan American Games.

== Competitors ==
The following table lists El Salvador's delegation per sport and gender.

Sport	Men	Women	Total
Goalball	0	6	6
Powerlifting	1	0	1
Swimming	1	0	0
Table tennis	2	0	2
Wheelchair basketball	0	10	10
Wheelchair tennis	2	0	2
Total	6	16	22

== Goalball ==
Women's tournament

- Ana Avalos
- Blanca Alicia Cubillas Diaz
- Jhosselin Garcia Ventura
- Silvia Molina Gonzalez
- Xiomara Peña Argueta
- Veronica Rivas

Team	Pld	W	D	L	GF	GA	GD	Pts	Qualification
Brazil	5	5	0	0	36	2	+34	15	Qualified for the semifinals
United States	5	4	0	1	36	5	+31	12	Qualified for the semifinals
Canada	5	3	0	2	33	8	+25	9	Qualified for the semifinals
Guatemala	5	2	0	3	19	36	−17	6	Qualified for the semifinals
Nicaragua	5	1	0	4	15	44	−29	3	
El Salvador	5	0	0	5	6	50	−44	0	

Source: results.toronto2015.org

== Powerlifting ==
Men

Athlete	Event	Result	Rank
Oscar Lopez	−59 kg	NM	

== Swimming ==
Men

Athlete	Event	Final	
Athlete	Event	Time	Rank
Carlos Cortez	50m Freestyle S11	32.08	5
Carlos Cortez	100m Freestyle S11	1:09.75	5

== Table tennis ==
Men

Athlete	Event	Round Robin				Semifinals	Final	
Athlete	Event	Opposition Result	Opposition Result	Opposition Result	Rank	Opposition Result	Opposition Result	Rank
Gabriel Espinoza Macal	Singles Class 4	Alexandre Macieria Ank (BRA); L 0–3	Rodolfo Quezada (GUA); L 0–3	Edson Gomez Sanchez (VEN); L 0–3	7	did not advance		7
Maximiliano Vasquez	Singles Class 7	Daryl Sterling (USA); L 0–3	Aleksy Kaniuka (ARG); L 0–3	Israel Pereira Stroh (BRA); L 0–3	7	did not advance		7

== Wheelchair basketball ==
Women

- Maritza Bautista
- Deysi Bernal
- Luz M Bonilla
- Marleny Chavez
- Morena Escalante
- Maritza Lopez
- Mirian Lopez
- Blanca Siguenza
- Irene I Villeda
- Zuleyma Zelaya

Pool B
Team	Pld	W	L	PF	PA	PD	Pts	Qualification
United States	3	3	0	256	35	+221	6	Qualified for the semifinals
Argentina	3	2	1	117	151	−34	5	Qualified for the semifinals
Peru	3	1	2	100	147	−47	4	
El Salvador	3	0	3	60	200	−140	3	

Team	5th-8th place round	7th-8th place round	Rank
Team	Opposition Result	Opposition Result	Rank
El Salvador	Mexico L 22-86	Guatemala L 38-44	8

== Wheelchair tennis ==
Ecuador sent two male athletes to compete.

Athlete	Event	Round of 32	Round of 16	Quarterfinals	Semifinals	Final / BM	
Athlete	Event	Opposition Score	Opposition Score	Opposition Score	Opposition Score	Opposition Score	Rank
Federico Huezo	Men's singles	Olivia (ESA); W 6-4,6-3	Rodrigues (BRA); L 0-6,1-6	did not advance			9th
Pedro Derez	Men's singles	Ramas (GUA); W 6-1,7-5	Casco (ARG); L 2-6,0-6	did not advance			9th
Federico Huezo; Pedro Derez	Men's doubles	Muro (MEX); Ortega (MEX); L 0-6,0-6	did not advance				9th
