= Athletics at the 2015 Parapan American Games – Women's 100 metres T37 =

Athletics – Women's 100 metres T37 at the 2015 Parapan American Games
- Venue: CIBC Athletics Stadium
- Dates: August 14
- Competitors: 4 from 3 nations

Medalists
1st place, gold medalist(s)		Yescarly Medina	Venezuela
2nd place, silver medalist(s)		Berliana Castellanos	Venezuela
3rd place, bronze medalist(s)		Lis Scaroni	Argentina

The women's T37 100 metres competition of the athletics events at the 2015 Parapan American Games was held on August 14 at the CIBC Athletics Stadium. The defending Parapan American Games champion was Sabra Hawkes of the United States of America.

== Records ==
Prior to this competition, the existing records were as follows:

World record	Mandy Francois-Elie (FRA)	13.68	Saint-Cyr-sur-Loire, France	June 8, 2013
Americas Record	Yescarly Medina (VEN)	14.62	São Paulo, Brazil	April 23, 2015

== Schedule ==
All times are Central Standard Time (UTC-6).

Date	Time	Round
14 August	15:40	Final

== Results ==
All times are shown in seconds.

KEY:	q	Fastest non-qualifiers	Q	Qualified	PR	Parapan American Games record	AR	Area record	NR	National record	PB	Personal best	SB	Seasonal best	DSQ	Disqualified	FS	False start

=== Final ===
Wind: +0.2 m/s

Rank	Name	Nation	Time	Notes
1st place, gold medalist(s)	Yescarly Medina	Venezuela	14.68	PR
2nd place, silver medalist(s)	Berliana Castellanos	Venezuela	14.72	PB
3rd place, bronze medalist(s)	Lis Scaroni	Argentina	14.74	
4	Suelen Marcheski de Olveira	Colombia	15.12	
