= Judo at the 2015 Parapan American Games =

- Venue: Abilities Centre
- Dates: August 12 to 14
- Competitors: 64 from 10 nations

Judo competitions at the 2015 Parapan American Games in Toronto were held from August 12 to 14 at the Abilities Centre, win Whitby, Ontario.

== Medal table ==
* Host nation (Canada)

| Rank | Nation | Gold | Silver | Bronze | Total |
|---|---|---|---|---|---|
| 1 | Brazil | 5 | 3 | 4 | 12 |
| 2 | Cuba | 3 | 2 | 1 | 6 |
| 3 | Mexico | 2 | 0 | 0 | 2 |
| 4 | Argentina | 1 | 3 | 2 | 6 |
| 5 | Venezuela | 1 | 0 | 2 | 3 |
| 6 | Uruguay | 1 | 0 | 0 | 1 |
| 7 | United States | 0 | 3 | 5 | 8 |
| 8 | Canada* | 0 | 1 | 1 | 2 |
| 8 | Colombia | 0 | 1 | 1 | 2 |
| 10 | Puerto Rico | 0 | 0 | 1 | 1 |
| Totals (10 entries) | | 13 | 13 | 17 | 43 |

== Medalists ==
The medalists:

=== Men's events ===
| Event | Gold | Silver | Bronze |
|---|---|---|---|
| Extra-lightweight (60 kg) | Henry Borges; Uruguay | Eduardo Gauto; Argentina | Juan Castallenos; Colombia |
| Extra-lightweight (60 kg) | Henry Borges; Uruguay | Eduardo Gauto; Argentina | Ron Hawthrone; United States |
| Half-lightweight (66 kg) | Marcos Falcón; Venezuela | Diego Piedrahita; Colombia | Sergio Perez; Cuba |
| Half-lightweight (66 kg) | Marcos Falcón; Venezuela | Diego Piedrahita; Colombia | Luiz Perez Diaz; Puerto Rico |
| Lightweight (73 kg) | Abner Nascimento; Brazil | Gerardo Rodriguez; Cuba | Mauricio Briceño; Venezuela |
| Half-middleweight (81 kg) | Eduardo Avila; Mexico | José Effron; Argentina | Alex Radoman; Canada |
| Half-middleweight (81 kg) | Eduardo Avila; Mexico | José Effron; Argentina | Harlley Pereira; Brazil |
| Middleweight (90 kg) | Jorge Lencina; Argentina | Jorge Hierrezuelo; Cuba | Antônio Tenório; Brazil |
| Middleweight (90 kg) | Jorge Lencina; Argentina | Jorge Hierrezuelo; Cuba | Dartanyon Crockett; United States |
| Half-heavyweight (100 kg) | Yordani Fernandez; Cuba | Myles Porter; United States | Artur Cavalcante; Brazil |
| Heavyweight (+100 kg) | Yangaliny Jimenez; Cuba | Wilians Silva; Brazil | Robert Anderson; United States |

=== Women's events ===
| Event | Gold | Silver | Bronze |
|---|---|---|---|
| Extra-lightweight (48 kg) | Karla Cardoso; Brazil | Paula Gomez; Argentina | Luiza Oliano; Brazil |
| Half-lightweight (52 kg) | Michele Ferreira; Brazil | Priscilla Gagne; Canada | Rocio Ledesma; Argentina |
| Lightweight (57 kg) | Lucia Teixeira; Brazil | Cynthia Paige Simon; United States | Marissa Arndt; United States |
| Half-middleweight (63 kg) | Dalidaivis Rodriguez; Cuba | Victoria Santos de Almeida; Brazil | Maria Sol Intrevado; Argentina |
| Middleweight (70 kg) | Lenia Ruvalcaba; Mexico | Alana Martins; Brazil | Naomi Soazo; Venezuela |
| Heavyweight (+70 kg) | Deane Silva De Almeida; Brazil | Sarah Chung; United States | Sara Luna; United States |

== Participating nations ==
A total of 10 nations sent their athletes to Judo tournaments.

- Argentina (8 athletes)
- Brazil (15)
- Canada (4)
- Colombia (2)
- Cuba (8)
- Mexico (2)
- Puerto Rico (1)
- Uruguay (1)
- United States (16)
- Venezuela (7)

== See also ==
- Judo at the 2016 Summer Paralympics
