= Yescarly Medina =

Venezuelan Paralympic athlete

Personal information
- Born: February 26, 1992 (age 34) Maracay, Venezuela

Sport
- Country: Venezuela
- Sport: Para-athletics
- Disability: Cerebral palsy
- Disability class: T37
- Event: 100 metres
Medal record
Women's para-athletics
Representing Venezuela
Paralympic Games
Bronze medal – third place	2016 Rio de Janeiro	100 m T37
Parapan American Games
Gold medal – first place	2015 Toronto	100 m T37
Bronze medal – third place	2019 Lima	100 m T37

Yescarly Medina is a Venezuelan Paralympic athlete with cerebral palsy. She represented Venezuela at the 2016 Summer Paralympics held in Rio de Janeiro, Brazil and she won the bronze medal in the 100 metres T37 event.

At the 2015 Parapan American Games held in Toronto, Canada, she won the gold medal in the women's 100 metres T37 event. At the 2019 Parapan American Games held in Lima, Peru, she won the bronze medal in that event.
