= Chile at the 2015 Parapan American Games =

- IOC code: CHI
- NOC: Comité Paralímpico Chile
- Website: www.paralimpico.cl

in Toronto 7–15 August 2015
- Competitors: 60
- Flag bearer: Cristian Valenzuela
- Medals Ranked 9th: Gold 4 Silver 2 Bronze 6 Total 12

Parapan American Games appearances
- 1999; 2003; 2007; 2011; 2015; 2019; 2023

Chile participated in the 2015 Parapan American Games. It won 4 gold, 2 silver and 6 bronze medals.

== Medalists ==
Medal	Name	Sport	Event	Date
Gold	Jorge Carinao Cardenas	Powerlifting	Men's 49 kg	August 8
Gold	Juan Carlos Garrido Acevedo	Powerlifting	Men's 59 kg	August 9
Gold	Matias Pino Lorca	Table Tennis	Men's Singles C6	August 10
Gold	Margarita Faundez Orellana; Rodrigo Mellado Donoso	Athletics	Women's 1500m T12	August 13
Silver	Cristian Valenzuela	Athletics	Men's 5000m T11	August 10
Silver	Cristian Aguirre Mora	Powerlifting	Men's 107 kg	August 11
Bronze	Cristian Dettoni	Table Tennis	Men's Singles C7	August 10
Bronze	Camila Campos Dominguez	Powerlifting	Women's 67 kg	August 10
Bronze	Tamara Monsalve Leonelli	Table Tennis	Women's Singles C5	August 10
Bronze	Frank Feliu Ubillas	Powerlifting	Men's 97 kg	August 11
Bronze	Matias Pino Lorca; Cristian Dettoni; Juan Sepulveda Pardo	Table Tennis	Men's Team C6-8g	August 13
Bronze	Cristian Valenzuela; Mauricio Valdivia	Athletics	Men's 1500m T11	August 14

Medals by sport
Sport	1st place, gold medalist(s)	2nd place, silver medalist(s)	3rd place, bronze medalist(s)	Total
Powerlifting	2	1	2	5
Athletics	1	1	1	3
Table Tennis	1	0	3	4
Total	4	2	6	12

Medals by day
Day	1st place, gold medalist(s)	2nd place, silver medalist(s)	3rd place, bronze medalist(s)	Total
August 8	1	0	0	1
August 9	1	0	0	1
August 10	1	1	3	5
August 11	0	1	1	2
August 13	1	0	1	2
August 14	0	0	1	1
Total	4	2	6	12

== Competitors ==
The following table lists Chile's delegation per sport and gender.

Sport	Men	Women	Total
Athletics	5	3	8
Football 5-a-side	10	0	10
Powerlifting	5	2	7
Swimming	4	5	9
Table tennis	8	2	10
Wheelchair rugby	12	0	12
Wheelchair tennis	2	2	4
Total	46	14	60

== Athletics ==
Chile sent five male and three female athletes to compete.

Men

Athlete	Event	Final	
Athlete	Event	Result	Rank
Nicolas Pino Maureira	100m T35	14.29	5th
Cristian Valenzuela; Mauricio Valdivia	1500m T11	4:16.78	3rd place, bronze medalist(s)
Luis Gutierrez Silva; Francisco Munoz Acuna	1500m T11	4:55.19	7th
Cristian Valenzuela; Raul Moya Vazquez	5000m T11	16:21.31	2nd place, silver medalist(s)

Field events

Athlete	Event	Final	
Athlete	Event	Distance	Position
Rodrigo Coloma Burgos	Shot Put F54/55	6.52	10th
Alan Moyano	Shot Put F54/55	7.32	6th
Rodrigo Coloma Burgos	Javelin Throw F53/54/55	13.22	13th
Alan Moyano	Javelin Throw F53/54/55	15.87	12th
Rodrigo Coloma Burgos	Discus Throw F54/55/56	18.48	14th
Alan Moyano	Discus Throw F54/55/56	20.57	13th

Women

Athlete	Event	Semifinal		Final	
Athlete	Event	Result	Rank	Result	Rank
Amanda Cerna Gamboa	100m T47	13.70	6th Q	13.87	6th
Amanda Cerna Gamboa	200m T47	28.37	6th Q	28.85	6th
Margarita Faundez Orellana; Rodrigo Mellado Donoso	400m T12	1:05.05	4th Q	1:04.86	4th
Margarita Faundez Orellana; Rodrigo Mellado Donoso	800m T12	2:24.63	2nd Q	2:23.04	4th
Paula Guzman Salazar; Ayleen Iturra Olivares	800m T12	3:13.90	11th	Did not advance	
Margarita Faundez Orellana; Rodrigo Mellado Donoso	1500m T12	—N/a		4:55.29	1st place, gold medalist(s)

== Football 5-a-side ==
Chile sent a team of eight athletes to compete:

- Mauricio Beltran Caceres
- Esteban Campos Arriagada
- Benjamin Cruz Valdivieso
- Matias Montenegro
- Fernando Opazo Campos
- Emiliano Rios Palmilla
- Erik Rodriguez Cisternas
- Victor Silva Pavez
- Sebastian Vergara Herrera
- Renato Villagra Sanchez

Preliminary Round

Team	P	W	D	L	G	GA	GD	Points
Brazil (BRA)	5	4	1	0	17	0	+17	13
Argentina (ARG)	5	3	2	0	10	1	+9	11
Colombia (COL)	5	2	2	1	7	5	+2	8
Mexico (MEX)	5	2	0	3	3	9	-6	6
Uruguay (URU)	5	0	2	3	1	12	-11	2
Chile (CHI)	5	0	1	4	1	12	-11	1

Qualified to Gold Medal Match
Qualified to Bronze Medal Match
08 August
18:00

Chile	0 – 6	Brazil
	Report	Steinmetz 3' 49'; Alves 22' 24' 25' 34'

Referee: Mariano Travaglino (ARG)

09 August
20:00

Chile	0 – 0	Uruguay
	Report

Referee: Mariano Travaglino (ARG)

10 August
16:00

Chile	1 – 2	Mexico
Steinmetz 4'	Report	Lanzagorta 7' 16'

Referee: Germi Guimaraes (BRA)

12 August
20:00

Chile	0 – 2	Colombia
	Report	Perez 37'; Morales 45'

Referee: Lucio Morgado (BRA)

13 August
18:00

Chile	0 – 2	Argentina
	Report	Rodriguez 12'; Padilla 19'

Referee: Germi Guimaraes (BRA)

2015 Parapan American Games Sixth Place

Chile

== Powerlifting ==
Chile sent five male and two female athletes to compete.

Athlete	Event	Attempts					Rank
Athlete	Event	Attempt 1	Attempt 2	Attempt 3	Attempt 4	Total	Rank
Jorge Carinao Cardenas	Men's 49 kg	~~145~~	145	148	-	166.40	1st place, gold medalist(s)
Juan Carlos Garrido Acevedo	Men's 59 kg	170	175	~~178~~	-	175	1st place, gold medalist(s)
Sebastian Castro Rajdl	Men's 72 kg	122	~~130~~	~~130~~	-	122	6th
Frank Feliu Ubillas	Men's 97 kg	165	170	~~177~~	-	170	3rd place, bronze medalist(s)
Cristian Aguirre Mora	Men's 107 kg	157	-	-	-	133.52	2nd place, silver medalist(s)
Camila Campos Dominguez	Women's 67 kg	75	80	~~83~~	-	82.15	3rd place, bronze medalist(s)
Maria Ortiz Becker	Women's 67 kg	85	~~90~~	~~94~~	-	79.75	4th

== Swimming ==
Chile sent four male and five female swimmers to compete.

Men

Athletes	Event	Heat		Final	
Athletes	Event	Time	Rank	Time	Rank
Alberto Abarza	50m Backstroke S4	1:02.87	7 Q	1:03.54	8th
Kevin Aravena	100m Breaststroke SB7	—N/a		1:41.46	4th
Milton Martinez	100m Breaststroke SB7	—N/a		2:09.39	5th
Alan Seron	100m Breaststroke SB7	—N/a		3:07.04	6th

Women

Athletes	Event	Heat		Final	
Athletes	Event	Time	Rank	Time	Rank
Francisca Castro	50m Freestyle S10	32.49	9th	Did not advance	
Macarena Quero	50m Freestyle S10	31.73	7 Q	31.40	6th
Valentina Munoz	100m Freestyle S8	1:22.84	7 Q	1:21.34	7th
Francisca Castro	100m Freestyle S10	1:11.70	9th	Did not advance	
Macarena Quero	100m Freestyle S10	1:08.90	5 Q	1:08.61	7th
Mailyn Gonzalez	400m Freestyle S9	—N/a		5:51.01	8th
Javiera Figueroa	400m Freestyle S10	—N/a		6:09.64	6th
Valentina Munoz	100m Backstroke S8	1:27.70	3 Q	1:28.02	4th
Francisca Castro	100m Backstroke S10	—N/a		1:16.94	5th
Valentina Munoz	100m Breaststroke SB8	—N/a		Disqualified	
Macarena Quero	100m Breaststroke SB9	—N/a		1:32.65	4th
Macarena Quero	200m Individual Medley SM10	2:53.24	9th	Did not advance	

== Table tennis ==
Chile sent eight male and two female table tennis players to compete.

Men

Athlete	Event	Round robin				Quarterfinals	Semifinals	Final	Rank
Athlete	Event	Match 1	Match 2	Match 3	Match 4	Quarterfinals	Semifinals	Final	Rank
Athlete	Event	Opposition Result	Opposition Result	Opposition Result	Opposition Result	Opposition Result	Opposition Result	Opposition Result	Rank
Alfonso Diaz Angel	Singles C3	Knaf (BRA); L 0-3	Murtaza (CAN); W 3-1	—N/a			Andrade (BRA); L 0-3	Did not advance	5th
Cristian Gonzalez Astete	Singles C4	Sanchez (MEX); L 2-3	Vento (VEN); W 3-1	Pessoa (BRA); L 0-3	—N/a	Did not advance			7th
Matias Pino Lorca	Singles C6	Arratia (USA); L 2-3	Medina (BRA); W 3-1	—N/a			Arguello (CRC); W 3-1	Arratia (USA); W 3-1	1st place, gold medalist(s)
Juan Sepulveda Pardo	Singles C6	Michell (BRA); L 1-3	Arguello (CRC); W 3-2	—N/a			Did not advance		5th
Cristian Dettoni	Singles C7	Martinez (VEN); W 3-0	Vargas (COL); L 1-3	Roman (CRC); W 3-0	—N/a	Kaniuka (ARG); W 3-0	Salmin (BRA); L 0-3	Did not advance	3rd place, bronze medalist(s)
Ruperto Morales Cortes	Singles C8	Guarnieri (BRA); L 0-3	Kroztch (ARG); W 3-2	—N/a		Kent (CAN); L 0-3	Did not advance		5th
Valentin Letelier Mendoza	Singles C9	Leibovitz (USA); L 0-3	Syed (CAN); L 1-3	—N/a		Did not advance			7th
Alvaro Vera Gutierrez	Singles C10	Manso (CUB); L 1-3	Dominguez (MEX); L 0-3	—N/a		Did not advance			7th
Alfonso Diaz Angel; Cristian Gonzalez Astete	Team C3-4	Venezuela (VEN); L 0-3, 3-1, 0-3	Mexico (MEX); L 0-3, 1-3	Canada (CAN); W 3-0, 3-0	Brazil (BRA); L 0-3, 0-3	—N/a			4th
Matias Pino Lorca; Cristian Dettoni; Juan Sepulveda Pardo	Team C6-8	Venezuela (VEN); W 3-1, 3-1	Canada (CAN); L 1-3, 1-3	Argentina (ARG); W 1-3, 3-0, 3-2	—N/a		Brazil (BRA); L 0-3, 0-3	Did not advance	3rd place, bronze medalist(s)
Valentin Letelier Mendoza; Alvaro Vera Gutierrez; Ruperto Morales Cortes	Team C9-10	Brazil (BRA); L 1-3, 0-3	Colombia (COL); W 3-2, 2-3, 3-0	—N/a		Cuba (CUB); L 2-3, 1-3	Did not advance		5th

Women's

Athlete	Event	Round robin			Semifinals	Final	Rank
Athlete	Event	Match 1	Match 2	Match 3	Semifinals	Final	Rank
Athlete	Event	Opposition Result	Opposition Result	Opposition Result	Opposition Result	Opposition Result	Rank
Tamara Monsalve Leonelli	Singles C5	Paredes (MEX); L 0-3	Leon (COL); W 3-0	—N/a	Pereira (BRA); L 0-3	Did not advance	3rd place, bronze medalist(s)
Francisca Morales Araya	Singles C9-10	Longhi (ARG); W 3-2	Rauen (BRA); L 0-3	Marques (BRA); L 0-3	—N/a		3rd

== Wheelchair rugby ==
Chile sent a team of twelve athletes to compete.

- Alexis Barraza Jara
- Andres Bisello Fuentes
- Alejandro Duran Vicencio
- Cristopher Flores Galdames
- Christian Madariaga Dallez
- Carlos Novoa Matus
- Andres Opazo Guerra
- Juan Rodriguez Reyes
- Jose Ruiz Soto
- Victor Saiz Bocaz
- Pedro Silva Rojas
- Jose Venegas Penailillo

Preliminary Round

Team	PLD	W	D	L	PF	PA	PD	Points
Colombia (COL)	1	1	0	0	66	12	+54	2
United States (USA)	1	1	0	0	70	25	+45	2
Canada (CAN)	1	1	0	0	65	32	+33	2
Brazil (BRA)	1	0	0	1	32	65	-33	0
Argentina (ARG)	1	0	0	1	25	70	-45	0
Chile (CHI)	1	0	0	1	12	66	-54	0

08 August
21:30

Chile	12 – 66	Colombia
	Report

09 August
19:15

Chile	14 – 53	Argentina
	Report

10 August
19:15

Chile	11 – 54	United States
	Report

11 August
17:45

Chile	11 – 67	Canada
	Report

12 August
15:30

Chile	6 – 45	Brazil
	Report

Fifth Place Match

13 August
15:30

Chile	24 – 56	Argentina
	Report

2015 Parapan American Games Sixth Place

Chile

== Wheelchair tennis ==
Chile sent two male and two female athletes to compete.

Athlete	Event	Round of 32	Round of 16	Quarterfinals	Semifinals	Final / BM	
Athlete	Event	Opposition Score	Opposition Score	Opposition Score	Opposition Score	Opposition Score	Rank
Francisco Cayulef	Men's singles	Apaza (PER); W 6-2, 6-2	Fernandez (ARG); L 1-6, 1-6	Did not advance			9th
Robinson Mendez	Men's singles	Ortega (MEX); W 6-0, 6-1	Bedard (CAN); W 6-1, 6-4	Rydberg (USA); L 1-6, 4-6	Did not advance		5th
Francisco Cayulef; Robinson Mendez	Men's doubles	—N/a	Oquendo (COL); Vega (COL); W 6-1, 1-6, 10-5	Fernandez (ARG); Casco (ARG); L 3-6, 6-4, 2-10	Did not advance		5th
Francisca Mardones	Women's singles	—N/a	Bye	Ishikawa (CAN); W 6-1, 6-1	Verfuerth (USA); L 4-6, 1-6	Kaiser (USA); L 1-6, 1-6	4th
Macarena Cabrillana	Women's singles	—N/a	Bernal (COL); L 4-6, 2-6	Did not advance			9th
Francisca Mardones; Macarena Cabrillana	Women's doubles	—N/a			Candida (BRA); Mayara (BRA); L 4-6, 6-3, 8-10	Kaiser (USA); Verfuerth (USA); L 1-6, 2-6	4th

== See also ==
- Chile at the 2016 Summer Paralympics
- Chile at the 2015 Pan American Games
