= Dominican Republic at the 2015 Parapan American Games =

- IOC code: DOM
- NOC: Organ. Dominicana de Ciegos Inc.
- Website: www.paralympic.org/dominican-republic

in Toronto 7–15 August 2015
- Competitors: 6 in 3 sports
- Medals Ranked 18th: Gold 0 Silver 0 Bronze 1 Total 1

Parapan American Games appearances
- 2011; 2015; 2019; 2023

Dominican Republic competed in the 2015 Parapan American Games.

== Competitors ==
The following table lists the Dominican delegation by sport and gender.

Sport	Men	Women	Total
Athletics	3	0	3
Cycling	2	0	0
Table tennis	1	0	0
Total	6	0	6

== Medalists ==
Medal	Name	Sport	Event	Date
Bronze	Rodny Minier	Cycling	Men's Road Race C4-5	August 8

== Athletics ==
Men

Athlete	Event	Heat		Final	
Athlete	Event	Time	Rank	Time	Rank
Breylin Martinez Gonzalez	100 m T11	12.35 PB	3	Did not advance	
Wemerson De La Rosa	100 m T47	12.00	7	Did not advance	
Wemerson De La Rosa	200 m T47	24.48	6	Did not advance	
Wemerson De La Rosa	Long Jump T47	—		5.66	8
Fabiel Cuello	Shot Put F57	—		23.72	9
Fabiel Cuello	Discus Throw F51/52/53/57	—		8.40	7
Fabiel Cuello	Javelin Throw F34/57	—		31.48	6

== Cycling ==
Road

Athlete	Event	Time	Rank
Rodny Minier	Men's Road Race C4-5	2:06:08	3rd place, bronze medalist(s)
Rodny Minier	Mixed Time Trial C1-5	29:54.41	16
Jose Rodriquez	Men's Road Race C4-5	2:06:29	4
Jose Rodriquez	Mixed Time Trial C1-5	33:41.78	28

Track

Athlete	Event	Qualification		Final / BM	
Athlete	Event	Time	Rank	Opposition Time	Rank
Rodny Minier	Men's Individual Pursuit C4-5	4:54.217	5	Did not advance	
Rodny Minier	Men's 1 km Time Trial C1-5	—		1:14.813	16
Jose Rodriquez	Men's Individual Pursuit C4-5	5:22.020	9	Did not advance	
Jose Rodriquez	Men's 1 km Time Trial C1-5	—		1:12.382	11

== Table tennis ==
Men

Athlete	Event	Round robin				Quarterfinals	Semifinals	Final	Rank
Athlete	Event	Match 1	Match 2	Match 3	Match 4	Quarterfinals	Semifinals	Final	Rank
Athlete	Event	Opposition Result	Opposition Result	Opposition Result	Opposition Result	Opposition Result	Opposition Result	Opposition Result	Rank
Odalis Gomez	Singles Class 8	Pérez (ARG); L 2-3	Kent (CAN); L 1-3	Salazar Perez (ECU); W 3-0	—	Did not advance			7

== See also ==
- Dominican Republic at the 2016 Summer Paralympics
- Dominican Republic at the 2015 Pan American Games
