= Jennifer Poist =

Personal information
- Born: March 14, 1989 (age 37) McSherrystown, Pennsylvania, United States

Sport
- Sport: Wheelchair basketball
Medal record
Representing United States
Paralympic Games
Gold medal – first place	2016 Rio de Janeiro	Women's
Parapan American Games
Gold medal – first place	2015 Toronto	Women's

Jennifer "Jenn" Poist (born March 14, 1989) is an American former wheelchair basketball player who competed in international basketball competitions. She is a Paralympic champion and Parapan American Games champion, she competed at the 2012 and 2016 Summer Paralympics.

Poist developed a tumour in her spinal cord aged seven which affected her mobility, she took up wheelchair basketball at this age and joined the NWBA junior basketball team aged fourteen. She graduated from University of Arizona in 2007 and works as a pharmacist in Tucson, Arizona.
