= Athletics at the 2016 Summer Paralympics – Men's 100 metres T36 =

Men's 100 metres T36 at the XV Paralympic Games
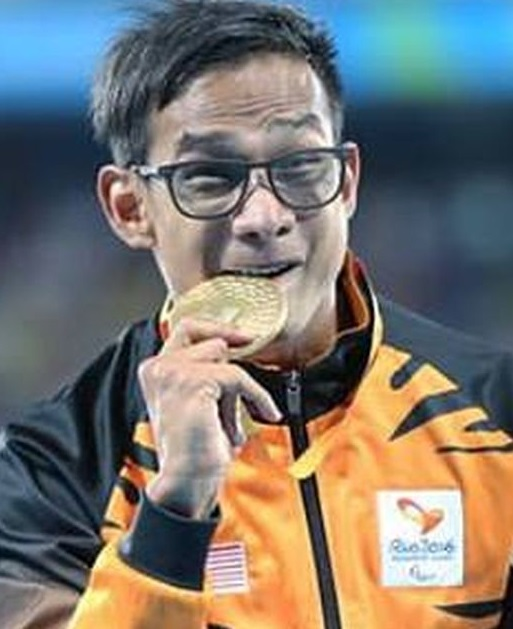
- Venue: Estádio Olímpico João Havelange
- Dates: 10 September 2016
- Competitors: 8 from 6 nations

Medalists
1st place, gold medalist(s)		Mohamad Ridzuan Mohamad Puzi	Malaysia
2nd place, silver medalist(s)		Yifei Yang	China
3rd place, bronze medalist(s)		Rodrigo Parreira da Silva	Brazil

The T36 category is for ambulant athletes with cerebral palsy. These athletes do not have the capacity to remain still and they show involuntary movements with all four limbs affected. They usually walk without assistive devices.

The Athletics at the 2016 Summer Paralympics – Men's 100 metres T36 event at the 2016 Paralympic Games took place on 10 September 2016, at the Estádio Olímpico João Havelange.

== Final ==
17:38 10 September 2016:

Rank	Lane	Bib	Name	Nationality	Reaction	Time	Notes
1st place, gold medalist(s)	4	1862	Mohamad Ridzuan Mohamad Puzi	Malaysia		12.07	
2nd place, silver medalist(s)	2	1267	Yifei Yang	China		12.20	
3rd place, bronze medalist(s)	7	1155	Rodrigo Parreira da Silva	Brazil		12.54	
4	5	1235	Mian Che	China		12.72	
5	8	1497	Graeme Ballard	Great Britain		12.84	
6	6	1919	Gabriel de Jesus Cuadra Holmann	Nicaragua		12.91	
7	9	1266	Xu Ran	China		12.96	
	3	2327	Roman Pavlyk	Ukraine			DSQ
