= Jared Arambula =

American wheelchair basketball player (born 1990)

Personal information
- Born: January 8, 1990 (age 36) Valparaiso, Indiana, U.S.

Sport
- Sport: Wheelchair basketball
Medal record
Representing the United States
Men's wheelchair basketball
Paralympic Games
Gold medal – first place	2016 Rio de Janeiro	Team
World Championship
Silver medal – second place	2018 Hamburg	Team
Parapan American Games
Gold medal – first place	2015 Toronto	Team
Americas Cup
Gold medal – first place	2017 Cali	Team
Gold medal – first place	2025 Bogotá	Team

Jared Arambula (born January 8, 1990) is an American wheelchair basketball player and a member of the United States men's national wheelchair basketball team. He represented the United States at the 2016 Summer Paralympics.

== Early life and education ==
Born in Valparaiso, Indiana to Ray and Karen Arambula, Arambula was born with spina bfida. When he was five, he discovered wheelchair basketball after he played in a softball league. He attended the University of Alabama, where he played wheelchair basketball and helped the team win the national championship while also serving as their co-captain. During his collegiate career, he won the Performance Award three times.

== Career ==
After his college career, Arambula began playing his club career in Italy.

Arambula competed at the 2015 Parapan American Games, where his team won the gold medal. He then became part of the U.S. team that won the gold medal at the 2016 Summer Paralympics. Arambula took part in the IWBF Americas Cup for the first time in 2017, which his team won. He was part of the U.S. squad that won the silver medal at the 2018 Wheelchair Basketball World Championship.

Arambula took part in his second Americas Cup in 2025, where his team won the tournament. This led him to be named the U.S. national team roster for the 2026 Wheelchair Basketball World Championships.
