= Mariela Delgado =

Argentine Paralympic cyclist

Personal information
- Born: 26 July 1986 (age 39) Posadas, Misiones, Argentina

Sport
- Country: Argentina
- Sport: Paralympic cycling
- Disability: Brachial plexus injury
- Disability class: C5
- Club: Weber La Segunda Ladies Power
Medal record
Women's para-cycling
Representing Argentina
Track World Championships
Silver medal – second place	2014 Aguascalientes	Scratch race C1-5
Bronze medal – third place	2016 Montichiari	Scratch race C4-5
Bronze medal – third place	2018 Rio de Janeiro	500 m time trial C5
Bronze medal – third place	2018 Rio de Janeiro	Scratch race C5
Bronze medal – third place	2025 Rio de Janeiro	1 km time trial C5
Bronze medal – third place	2025 Rio de Janeiro	Sprint C5
Road World Championships
Silver medal – second place	2017 Pietermaritzburg	Road race C5
Bronze medal – third place	2014 Greenville	Road race C5
Parapan American Games
Gold medal – first place	2015 Toronto	Individual pursuit C1-5
Gold medal – first place	2015 Toronto	500m time trial C1-5
Gold medal – first place	2019 Lima	Road race C4-5
Silver medal – second place	2015 Toronto	Road race C1-5
Silver medal – second place	2019 Lima	500m time trial C1-5
Bronze medal – third place	2019 Lima	Individual pursuit C4-5
Pan American Track Championships
Gold medal – first place	2022 Maringá	Time trial C5
Gold medal – first place	2022 Maringá	Individual pursuit C5
Gold medal – first place	2022 Maringá	Omnium C5
Silver medal – second place	2022 Maringá	Scratch C5
Pan American Road Championships
Gold medal – first place	2022 Maringá	Road race C5
Silver medal – second place	2022 Maringá	Time trial C5

Mariela Analia Delgado (born 26 July 1986) is an Argentine Paralympic cyclist who competes in international elite cycling events and races for the able-bodied road cycling team Weber La Segunda Ladies Power. She is a three-time Parapan American Games champion, seven-time World medalist and has competed at the 2016 and 2020 Summer Paralympics.

Delgado was the first Argentine to compete at both the Pan American Games and Parapan American Games. She competed at the 2015 Pan American Games in the road race and road time trial where she was placed 22nd and 13th respectively.
