= Ariel Quassi =

Argentine Paralympic swimmer

Personal information
- Full name: Marcelo Ariel Quassi
- Born: 9 November 1982 (age 43) Avellaneda, Argentina
- Height: 160 cm (5 ft 3 in)
- Weight: 58 kg (128 lb)

Sport
- Country: Argentina
- Sport: Paralympic swimming
- Disability: Spinal atrophy
- Disability class: S5, SB4
- Retired: 2019
Medal record
Paralympic swimming
Representing Argentina
World Championships (SC)
Bronze medal – third place	2009 Rio de Janeiro	Men's 100m individual medley SM5
Parapan American Games
Silver medal – second place	2003 Mar del Plata	Men's 50m butterfly S5
Silver medal – second place	2003 Mar del Plata	Men's 200m individual medley SM5
Silver medal – second place	2011 Guadalajara	Men's 4x50m medley relay
Bronze medal – third place	2003 Mar del Plata	Men's 50m backstroke S5
Bronze medal – third place	2011 Guadalajara	Men's 4x50m freestyle relay
Bronze medal – third place	2019 Lima	Men's 100m breaststroke SB4

Marcelo Ariel Quassi (born 9 November 1982) is a retired Argentine Paralympic swimmer who competed in international level events. He has competed at the Paralympic Games four times and is a four-time Parapan American Games medalist.
