= Franco Medina =

Peruvian footballer (born 1999)

Personal information
- Full name: Franco Anthony Medina Soto
- Date of birth: 18 July 1999 (age 27)
- Place of birth: Lima, Peru
- Height: 1.79 m (5 ft 10 in)
- Position: Right-back

Team information
- Current team: Monsoon FC
- Number: 13

Youth career
- Alianza Lima

Senior career*
Years	Team	Apps	(Gls)
2019–2020	Alianza Lima	9	(0)
2019	→ César Vallejo (loan)	19	(0)
2021–2022	Deportivo Municipal	50	(0)
2023	Cienciano	4	(0)
2023–2024	Sporting Cristal	9	(0)
2024	Comerciantes Unidos	4	(0)
2025	Ayacucho	12	(0)
2025	Deportivo Binacional	1	(0)
2026–	Monsoon FC	-	(0)

International career
2018–2019	Peru U18		
2018–2019	Peru U20	3	(0)
2019–2020	Peru U23		
- * Club domestic league appearances and goals as of 22:22, 6 December 2025 (UTC)

Franco Anthony Medina Soto (born 18 July 1999) is a Peruvian footballer who plays as a right-back for Campeonato Gaúcho side Monsoon FC.

== Club career ==
=== Alianza Lima ===
Medina is a product of Alianza Lima. In June 2018, Medina signed his first professional contract with Alianza Lima after an impressive season with the club's reserve team. However, he wasn't used on the first team yet and therefore, he was loaned out to César Vallejo for the 2019 season, to gain some experience. Medina became a regular player for César Vallejo, playing 19 games in the Peruvian Primera División.

In the beginning of 2020, he suffered from a dislocated shoulder after a game for the U-23 national team and was set to be out for several months.

=== Deportivo Municipal ===
On 2 January 2021 it was confirmed, that Medina had signed with Deportivo Municipal for the 2021 season. He got his debut for the team in the first game of the season against Sport Huancayo on 12 March 2021.

=== Sporting Cristal ===
After a short six-months spell at Cienciano, which he signed for in January 2023, Medina signed with Sporting Cristal in July 2023.

=== Comerciantes Unidos ===
In July 2024, Medina moved to Comerciantes Unidos.

=== Ayacucho FC ===
Ahead of the 2025 season, Medina joined Peruvian Primera División side Ayacucho FC.

=== Deportivo Binacional ===
In August 2025, Medina joined Deportivo Binacional.

== International career ==
In May 2019, Medina was called up for the Peruvian U23 national team who was going to play the 2019 Pan American Games. He was later also called up for the 2020 CONMEBOL Pre-Olympic Tournament.
