= Rodrigo Parreira da Silva =

Brazilian Paralympic athlete (born 1994)

Rodrigo Parreira
Personal information
- Full name: Rodrigo Parreira da Silva
- Born: 9 September 1994 (age 31) Rio Verde, Goiás, Brazil

Sport
- Country: Brazil
- Sport: Para athletics
- Disability class: T36
- Events: 100 metres; 200 metres; Long jump
Medal record
Paralympic Games
Silver medal – second place	2016 Rio de Janeiro	Long jump T36
Bronze medal – third place	2016 Rio de Janeiro	100 m T36
World Championships
Silver medal – second place	2017 London	Long jump T36
Silver medal – second place	2019 Dubai	Long jump T36
Bronze medal – third place	2017 London	100 m T36
Bronze medal – third place	2017 London	200 m T36
Bronze medal – third place	2024 Kobe	Long jump T36
Parapan American Games
Gold medal – first place	2019 Lima	Long jump T36
Silver medal – second place	2019 Lima	100 m T36
Silver medal – second place	2023 Santiago	Long jump T36
Bronze medal – third place	2015 Toronto	100 m T36

Rodrigo Parreira da Silva (Note: This name uses Portuguese naming customs: the first or maternal family name is Parreira and the second or paternal family name is da Silva.) (born 9 September 1994) is a Brazilian Paralympic athlete.

== Career ==
He represented Brazil at the 2016 Summer Paralympics held in Rio de Janeiro, Brazil and he won two medals: the silver medal in the men's long jump T36 event and the bronze medal in the men's 100 metres T36 event.

At the 2017 World Para Athletics Championships held in London, United Kingdom, he won the bronze medal in the men's 200 metres T36. He also won the silver medal in the men's long jump T36 event and the bronze medal in the men's 100 metres T36 event.

In 2023, he competed in the men's long jump T36 event at the World Para Athletics Championships held in Paris, France.
