= Yohana Aguilar =

Argentine blind footballer (born 1998)

Personal information
- Full name: Yohana Gabriela Aguilar
- Date of birth: 20 March 1998 (age 28)
- Place of birth: Córdoba, Argentina
- Position: Forward

Team information
- Current team: Club Municipalidad

Senior career*
Years	Team	Apps	(Gls)
2017-present	Club Municipalidad		

International career
- Argentina
Medal record
Representing Argentina
Women's blind football
Women's World Championship
Gold medal – first place	2023 Birmingham	Team
Gold medal – first place	2025 Kakkanad	Team
Women's American Championship
Gold medal – first place	2026 São Paulo	Team
- * Club domestic league appearances and goals

Yohana Gabriela Aguilar (born 20 March 1998) is an Argentine blind footballer who plays as a forward for Club Municipalidad and the Argentina national team.

Aguilar was the world champion of the first Women's Blind Football World Championship in 2023. She scored both of Argentina's goals in the final and was the tournament's top scorer with seven goals.

She was also president of the Argentine Federation of Sports for the Blind.

== Early life and career ==
Aguilar grew up in the Argüello neighborhood and began playing football in 2017, after having experience with classical dance and figure skating. She also competed in athletics, a sport in which she represented the Argentine Paralympic delegation at the 2015 Parapan American Games.

== Club career ==
Aguilar took her first steps in football at Club Municipalidad and in 2019 had the opportunity to participate in a world team for a friendly match against Japan. With the Guerreras de Alta Córdoba, she was champion of the National Blind Football League in 2022 and 2024.

In 2024, Aguilar was recognized as a "distinguished personality of Córdoba" and a "distinguished young person of Córdoba" by the City Council.

== International career ==
Aguilar is a regular member of the Argentine national team, Las Murciélagas (The Bats). She won the first Women's Blind Football World Championship in 2023. She was the tournament's top scorer and scored both goals in the final, in which they defeated Japan 2-1.

The team consisted of ten players, of whom Aguilar and five other teammates from Club Municipalidad were from Córdoba. Aguilar expressed her gratitude for the financial support from the national and municipal governments that enabled them to participate in the competition, which saw Argentina become the first champion in its history.

Aguilar took part in the second Women's Blind Football World Championship in 2023, in which her team won again. She also took part in the inaugural Women's Blind Football American Championship, which her team became the first champions.
