= Colombia at the 2015 Parapan American Games =

- IPC code: COL

August 7, 2015 – August 15, 2015
- Competitors: 135
- Medals: Gold 24 Silver 36 Bronze 30 Total 90

Colombia competed at the 2015 Parapan American Games held in Toronto, Canada.

== Medalists ==
Medal	Name	Sport	Event	Date
Silver	Diego Piedrahita	Judo	Men's 66 kg	
Silver	Angélica Bernal; Johana Martinez	Wheelchair tennis	Women's doubles	
Bronze	Juan Castellanos	Judo	Men's 60 kg	
Bronze	Wheelchair rugby team	Wheelchair rugby	Wheelchair rugby tournament	

== Wheelchair rugby ==
Colombia won the bronze medal in the wheelchair rugby tournament.
