= Brazil at the 2015 Parapan American Games =

- IPC code: BRA
- NPC: Brazilian Paralympic Committee

in Toronto, Canada August 7, 2015 – August 15, 2015
- Competitors: 276 in 15 sports
- Flag bearer: Terezinha Guilhermina
- Medals: Gold 109 Silver 74 Bronze 74 Total 257

Parapan American Games appearances (overview)
- 1999; 2003; 2007; 2011; 2015; 2019; 2023

Brazil competed at the 2015 Parapan American Games held in Toronto, Canada. It was held from August 7 to August 15.

== Medalists ==
Medal	Name	Sport	Event	Date
Gold	Michele Ferreira	Judo	Women's 52 kg	
Silver	Alana Maldonado	Judo	Women's 70 kg	
Bronze	Artur Cavalcante	Judo	Men's 100 kg	
Bronze	Antônio Tenório Silva	Judo	Men's 90 kg	

== Football 7-a-side ==
Brazil won the football 7-a-side tournament.

== Goalball ==
Brazil won the gold medal in both the men's tournament and women's tournament.

Men's group stage

Team	Pld	W	D	L	GF	GA	GD	Pts	Qualification
Brazil	5	5	0	0	52	10	+42	15	Qualified for the semifinals
Canada	5	4	0	1	36	20	+16	12	Qualified for the semifinals
United States	5	3	0	2	40	27	+13	9	Qualified for the semifinals
Argentina	5	2	0	3	44	35	+9	6	Qualified for the semifinals
Venezuela	5	1	0	4	23	53	−30	3	
Puerto Rico	5	0	0	5	4	54	−50	0	

Source: results.toronto2015.org

Men's semifinal

Team 1	Score	Team 2
Brazil	9–4	Argentina

Men's final

Team 1	Score	Team 2
Brazil	10–4	United States

Women's group stage

Team	Pld	W	D	L	GF	GA	GD	Pts	Qualification
Brazil	5	5	0	0	36	2	+34	15	Qualified for the semifinals
United States	5	4	0	1	36	5	+31	12	Qualified for the semifinals
Canada	5	3	0	2	33	8	+25	9	Qualified for the semifinals
Guatemala	5	2	0	3	19	36	−17	6	Qualified for the semifinals
Nicaragua	5	1	0	4	15	44	−29	3	
El Salvador	5	0	0	5	6	50	−44	0	

Source: results.toronto2015.org

Women's semifinal

Team 1	Score	Team 2
Brazil	10–0	Guatemala

Women's final

Team 1	Score	Team 2
Brazil	7–6	United States

== Sitting volleyball ==
Brazil won the gold medal in the men's tournament and the silver medal in the women's tournament.

== Wheelchair basketball ==
Brazil won the bronze medal in the women's tournament.

== Wheelchair rugby ==
Brazil lost their bronze medal match against Colombia in the wheelchair rugby tournament.
