= Mexico at the 2015 Parapan American Games =

- IPC code: MEX

in Toronto, Canada August 7, 2015 – August 15, 2015
- Medals: Gold 38 Silver 36 Bronze 39 Total 113

Mexico competed at the 2015 Parapan American Games held in Toronto, Canada.

== Medalists ==
Medal	Name	Sport	Event	Date
Gold	Eduardo Ávila Sánchez	Judo	Men's 81 kg	
Gold	Lenia Ruvalcaba	Judo	Women's 70 kg	
