= United States at the Parapan American Games =

- Flag of the United States
- IPC code: USA
- NPC: United States Olympic & Paralympic Committee
- Website: www.usopc.org
- Medals Ranked 3rd: Gold 275 Silver 297 Bronze 257 Total 829

Parapan American Games appearances (overview)
- 1999; 2003; 2007; 2011; 2015; 2019; 2023

The United States has sent athletes to every celebration of the Parapan American Games. The United States Olympic & Paralympic Committee (USOPC) is the National Paralympic Committee for the United States.

== Medal tables ==
=== Medals by Games ===
Games	Gold	Silver	Bronze	Total	Rank	
Games	Gold	Silver	Bronze	Total	Gold medals	Total medals
1999 Mexico City	24	27	19	70	4	4
(Argentina) 2003 Mar del Plata	10	8	6	24	6	5
(Brazil) 2007 Rio de Janeiro	37	44	36	117	3	2
(Mexico) 2011 Guadalajara	51	47	34	132	2	3
(Canada) 2015 Toronto	40	51	44	135	3	3
(Peru) 2019 Lima	58	62	65	185	2	2
(Chile) 2023 Santiago	55	58	53	166	2	2
Total	275	297	257	829	3	3

== See also ==
- United States at the Pan American Games
- United States at the Junior Pan American Games
- United States at the Paralympics
