= Brazil at the Parapan American Games =

- IPC code: BRA
- NPC: Brazilian Paralympic Committee
- Website: www.cpb.org.br
- Medals Ranked 1st: Gold 740 Silver 522 Bronze 447 Total 1,709

Parapan American Games appearances (overview)
- 1999; 2003; 2007; 2011; 2015; 2019; 2023

Brazil has sent athletes to every celebration of the Parapan American Games. The Brazilian Paralympic Committee (CPB) is the National Paralympic Committee for the Brazil.

== Medal tables ==
=== Medals by Summer Games ===
Red border colour indicates host nation status.

Games	Gold	Silver	Bronze	Total	Rank	
Games	Gold	Silver	Bronze	Total	Gold medals	Total medals
1999 Mexico City	107	69	36	212	2	2
(Argentina) 2003 Mar del Plata	81	53	31	165	2	2
(Brazil) 2007 Rio de Janeiro	83	68	77	228	1	1
(Mexico) 2011 Guadalajara	81	61	55	197	1	1
(Canada) 2015 Toronto	109	74	74	257	1	1
(Peru) 2019 Lima	123	99	85	307	1	1
(Chile) 2023 Santiago	156	98	89	343	1	1
Total	740	522	447	1709	1	1

=== Medals by sport ===
Between the end of the 2007 Parapan American Games the conclusion of the 2023 Parapan American Games

Leading in that sport

Sport	Gold	Silver	Bronze	Total
Swimming	229	156	153	538
Athletics	153	132	95	380
Table tennis	60	42	41	143
Judo	17	15	15	47
Powerlifting	16	12	19	47
Boccia	15	3	8	26
Badminton	13	13	5	31
Road cycling	9	5	4	18
Taekwondo	6	5	10	21
Goalball	6	1	1	8
Football 5-a-side	5	0	0	5
Shooting	4	7	5	16
Track cycling	4	2	6	12
Sitting volleyball	4	2	0	6
Equestrian	4	1	0	5
Football 7-a-side	4	0	0	4
Wheelchair tennis	3	5	6	14
Archery	3	1	0	4
Wheelchair fencing	1	0	0	1
Wheelchair basketball	0	0	5	5
Wheelchair rugby	0	0	1	1
Totals (21 entries)	556	402	374	1,332

== See also ==
- Brazil at the Pan American Games
- Brazil at the 2021 Junior Pan American Games
- Brazil at the Paralympics
