= Paraguay at the Parapan American Games =

- IPC code: PAR
- NPC: Paraguayan Paralympic Committee
- Website: comiteparalimpicoparaguayo.org.py
- Medals Ranked 24th: Gold 0 Silver 0 Bronze 1 Total 1

Parapan American Games appearances (overview)
- 2007; 2011; 2015; 2019; 2023

Paraguay has sent athletes to the Parapan American Games since its third edition in 2007. The Paraguayan Paralympic Committee (CPP) is the National Paralympic Committee for Paraguay.

== Medal tables ==
Games	Gold	Silver	Bronze	Total	Rank	
Games	Gold	Silver	Bronze	Total	Gold medals	Total medals
1999 Mexico City	Did not participate					
(Argentina) 2003 Mar del Plata	Did not participate					
(Brazil) 2007 Rio de Janeiro	0	0	1	1	17	17
(Mexico) 2011 Guadalajara	Did not participate					
(Canada) 2015 Toronto	Did not participate					
(Peru) 2019 Lima	0	0	0	0	-	-
(Chile) 2023 Santiago	0	0	0	0	-	-
Total	0	0	1	1	24	24

=== Medals by sport ===
Leading in that sport

Sport	Gold	Silver	Bronze	Total
Football 5-a-side	0	0	1	1
Totals (1 entries)	0	0	1	1

== See also ==
- Paraguay at the Pan American Games
- Paraguay at the Paralympics
