= Canada at the Parapan American Games =

- Flag of Canada
- IPC code: CAN
- NPC: Canadian Paralympic Committee
- Website: www.paralympic.ca
- Medals Ranked 5th: Gold 155 Silver 168 Bronze 165 Total 488

Parapan American Games appearances (overview)
- 1999; 2003; 2007; 2011; 2015; 2019; 2023

Canada has sent athletes to every celebration of the Parapan American Games. The Canadian Paralympic Committee (CPC) is the National Paralympic Committee for Canada.

== Hosting the Games ==
Canada has hosted the Games once, in 2015.

Games	Host city	Dates	Nations	Participants	Events
2015 Parapan American Games	Toronto	August 7 to August 15, 2015	28	1,651	317 in 15 sports

== Medal tables ==
=== Medals by Games ===
Red border colour indicates host nation status.

Games	Gold	Silver	Bronze	Total	Rank	
Games	Gold	Silver	Bronze	Total	Gold medals	Total medals
1999 Mexico City	4	3	3	10	9	11
(Argentina) 2003 Mar del Plata	13	7	3	23	5	6
(Brazil) 2007 Rio de Janeiro	49	37	26	112	2	4
(Mexico) 2011 Guadalajara	13	22	28	63	8	5
(Canada) 2015 Toronto	50	63	55	168	2	2
(Peru) 2019 Lima	17	21	22	60	6	6
(Chile) 2023 Santiago	9	15	28	52	8	6
Total	155	168	165	488	5	5

== See also ==
- Canada at the Pan American Games
- Canada at the Junior Pan American Games
- Canada at the Paralympics
