= Perla Muñoz =

Argentine Paralympic athlete (born 1974)

Personal information
- Full name: Perla Amanda Muñoz
- Nickname: Perli
- Born: 27 February 1974 (age 52) Bahía Blanca, Argentina
- Height: 1.58 m (5 ft 2 in)
- Weight: 56 kg (123 lb)

Sport
- Country: Argentina
- Sport: Paralympic athletics
- Disability: Cerebral palsy
- Disability class: T35
Medal record
Paralympic athletics
Representing Argentina
World Championships
Bronze medal – third place	1998 Birmingham	Women's shot put F35
Bronze medal – third place	1998 Birmingham	Women's javelin throw F35
Parapan American Games
Gold medal – first place	1999 Mexico City	Women's 100m T35
Gold medal – first place	1999 Mexico City	Women's 200m T35
Gold medal – first place	1999 Mexico City	Women's 400m T35
Gold medal – first place	2003 Mar del Plata	Women's discus throw F35
Gold medal – first place	2003 Mar del Plata	Women's javelin throw F35
Gold medal – first place	2003 Mar del Plata	Women's shot put F35
Silver medal – second place	2007 Rio de Janeiro	Women's discus throw F35
Silver medal – second place	2007 Rio de Janeiro	Women's shot put F35
Bronze medal – third place	2007 Rio de Janeiro	Women's javelin throw F35
Bronze medal – third place	2011 Guadalajara	Women's discus throw F35
Bronze medal – third place	2011 Guadalajara	Women's shot put F35

Perla Amanda Muñoz (born 27 February 1974) is a retired Argentine Paralympic athlete who competed in shot put, discus and javelin throwing events at international elite events. She has participated at the Parapan American Games five times consecutively and the Paralympic Games four times.
