= Bermuda at the 2023 Parapan American Games =

- Flag of Bermuda
- IPC code: BER
- NPC: Bermuda Paralympic Association
- Website: www.paralympic.org/bermuda

in Santiago, Chile 17 November 2023 – 26 November 2023
- Competitors: 3 (1 man and 2 women) in 2 sports
- Flag bearers (opening): Omar Yussef Hayward; Yushae DeSilva-Andrade
- Flag bearer (closing): Yushae DeSilva-Andrade
- Medals Ranked 13th: Gold 1 Silver 1 Bronze 0 Total 2

Parapan American Games appearances
- 2011; 2015; 2019; 2023

Bermuda is scheduled to compete in the 2023 Parapan American Games in Santiago, Chile from 17 November to 26 November 2023. This is Bermuda's fourth appearance at the Parapan American Games, having first competed in the 2011 edition.

Boccia players Omar Yussef Hayward and Yushae DeSilva-Andrade were the country's flagbearers during the opening ceremony. Meanwhile, Yushae DeSilva-Andrade was also the country's flagbearer during the closing ceremony.

== Medalists ==
The following competitors won medals at the games. In the discipline sections below, the medalists' names are bolded.

Medal	Name	Sport	Event	Date
Gold	Jessica Cooper Lewis	Athletics	Women's 100 metres T53	November 25
Silver	Yushae DeSilva-Andrade	Boccia	Women's individual BC1	November 22

== Competitors ==
The following is the list of number of competitors (per gender) participating at the games per sport/discipline.

Sport	Men	Women	Total
Athletics	0	1	1
Boccia	1	1	2
Total	1	2	3

== Athletics ==
Women

Track events

Athlete	Event	Semifinal		Final	
Athlete	Event	Result	Rank	Result	Rank
**Jessica Cooper Lewis**	100 m T53	—N/a		16.71 **PR**	1st place, gold medalist(s)
**Jessica Cooper Lewis**	400 m T53/T54	—N/a		1:01.74	5
**Jessica Cooper Lewis**	800 m T53/T54	—N/a		2:08.37	6

== Boccia ==
Men

Athlete	Event	Pool matches				Semifinals	Final / BM	
Athlete	Event	Opposition Score	Opposition Score	Opposition Score	Rank	Opposition Score	Opposition Score	Rank
Omar Yussef Hayward	Individual BC1	Calderón (CHI); **W** 7–2	Págua (VEN); **W** 5–3	Chagas (BRA); **W** 6*–6	1 **Q**	Cryderman (CAN); **L** 2–5	Bronze medal final Chagas (BRA); **L** 3–4	4

Women

Athlete	Event	Pool matches			
Athlete	Event	Opposition Score	Opposition Score	Opposition Score	Rank
**Yushae DeSilva-Andrade**	Individual BC1	Flores (ARG); **W** 3–2	Quiroz (ECU); **W** 5–2	Oliveira (BRA); **L** 3–3*	2nd place, silver medalist(s)

== See also ==
- Bermuda at the 2023 Pan American Games
- Bermuda at the 2024 Summer Paralympics
