= Bermuda at the 2011 Parapan American Games =

- IOC code: BER
- NOC: Bermuda Paralympic Association
- Website: http://www.paralympic.org/bermuda

in Guadalajara 12–20 November 2011
- Competitors: 1 in 1 sport
- Medals: Gold 0 Silver 0 Bronze 0 Total 0

Parapan American Games appearances
- 1999; 2003; 2007; 2011; 2015; 2019; 2023

Bermuda competed in the Parapan American Games for the first time in its 2011 edition. Its only competitor was Jessica Cooper Lewis, who competed in track events.

== Athletics ==
Women's track

Athlete	Event	Final	
Athlete	Event	Time	Rank
Jessica Cooper Lewis	100 m T53	20.78	4
Jessica Cooper Lewis	200 m T53	38.35	4
Jessica Cooper Lewis	400 m T53	1:12.90	5

== See also ==
- Bermuda at the 2011 Pan American Games
- Bermuda at the 2012 Summer Paralympics
