= Rosie Long =

Canadian wheelchair basketball player (born 2006)

- Long at the 2026 Wheelchair Basketball World Championships

Personal information
- Born: October 9, 2006 (age 20) Oakville, Ontario, Canada
- Education: University of Arizona

Sport
- Sport: Wheelchair basketball
- Disability: Spinal cord stroke
- Disability class: 1.0
Medal record
Women's wheelchair basketball
Representing Canada
World Championship
Silver medal – second place	2026 Ottawa	Team
Youth Parapan American Games
Gold medal – first place	2025 Santiago	Team

Rosie Long (born October 9, 2006) is a Canadian wheelchair basketball player and a member of Canada women's national wheelchair basketball team.

== Career ==
Long broke into high-level competition as organized sport reopened following the COVID-19 pandemic. In March 2022 she represented Ontario at the Canadian Junior National Championships for wheelchair basketball. Encouraged to return to wheelchair track racing for cross-training, she qualified for Team Ontario at the 2022 Canada Summer Games winning gold in the women's wheelchair 100 metres, and silver in women's wheelchair 1500 metres.. In February 2023 she again represented Ontario at the winter edition of the 2023 Canada Winter Games, playing wheelchair basketball for the provincial team. During the buildup to that competition, she was featured as a "Future Watch" subject for Wheelchair Basketball Canada's web and social media campaigns..

She first represented Canada in wheelchair basketball in junior competition at the Osaka Cup in February 2025. She was a member of Canada's gold-medal winning quartet in 3x3 wheelchair basketball at the 2025 Youth Parapan American Games. She made her senior national team debut for Canada in October 2025 during the America's Cup.

On June 17, 2026, Long was selected to represent Canada at the 2026 Commonwealth Games. She competed in the 3x3 basketball tournament where Canada lost to Australia in the bronze medal game. In August 2026, she was selected to represent Canada at the 2026 Wheelchair Basketball World Championships. Canada lost to the United States in the final 77–76 and won a silver medal. This was Canada's first medal at the Wheelchair Basketball World Championship since 2014.,

== Personal life ==
On November 7, 2016, Long was riding her bicycle when she was struck and dragged by a school bus. She suffered a spinal cord stroke due to prolonged and severe low blood pressure in the small blood vessels that supply the nerve column. During rehabilitation at Holland Bloorview Kids Rehabilitation Hospital in Toronto, she was introduced to adaptive sports. In the following three years she participated in para ice hockey, wheelchair track, wheelchair tennis, and wheelchair basketball, amongst others, before settling on basketball as her favoured sport.

She is an undergraduate student at the University of Arizona.
