= Jessica Frotten =

Personal information
- Nationality: Canada
- Born: 23 April 1988 (age 38)
- Home town: Whitehorse, Yukon

Sport
- Disability class: T53
- Club: CYCLONES Athletics
Medal record
Women's para-athletics
Representing Canada
Parapan American Games
Bronze medal – third place	2015 Toronto	100 m T53
Bronze medal – third place	2015 Toronto	400 m T53

Jessica Frotten (born April 23, 1988) is a Canadian Paralympic athlete who competed in the T53 classification.

In 2015, Frotten competed at the 2015 Parapan American Games where she won bronze in the 100 metres and 400 metres events.

Frotten was selected to compete at the 2020 Summer Paralympics in Tokyo, participating in the 400, 800, and 1500 metres events, as well as the Mixed 4×100 metres relay.

Additionally, Frotten was a member of the Canadian national team at the 2015 IPC Athletics World Championships and 2017 World Para Athletics Championships, as well as the 2018 and 2022 Commonwealth Games.

In 2024, Frotten was inducted into the Regina Sports Hall of Fame, having spent the majority of her athletic career training in Saskatchewan.
