= Virgin Islands at the 2023 Parapan American Games =

- Flag of United States Virgin Islands
- IPC code: ISV
- NPC: National Paralympic Committee US Virgin Islands
- Website: www.paralympic.org/us-virgin-islands

in Santiago, Chile 17 November 2023 – 26 November 2023
- Competitors: 1 in 1 sport
- Flag bearer (opening): Andrew Hairston
- Flag bearer (closing): Andrew Hairston
- Medals: Gold 0 Silver 0 Bronze 0 Total 0

Parapan American Games appearances
- 2015; 2019; 2023

The United States Virgin Islands also known as the Virgin Islands is scheduled to compete in the 2023 Parapan American Games in Santiago, Chile from 17 November to 26 November 2023. This was Virgin Islands's second appearance at the Parapan American Games, having first competed in the 2015 edition.

Paralympic cyclist Andrew Hairston was the country's flagbearer during the opening ceremony and the closing ceremony.

== Competitors ==
The following is the list of number of competitors (per gender) participating at the games per sport/discipline.

Sport	Men	Women	Total
Cycling	1	0	1
Total	1	0	1

== Cycling ==
=== Road ===
Men

Athlete	Event	Time	Rank
Andrew Hairston	Time trial H1–5	37:39.64	11
Andrew Hairston	Road race H3–5	–1 LAP	9

== See also ==
- Virgin Islands at the 2023 Pan American Games
- Virgin Islands at the 2024 Summer Paralympics
