= Haiti at the 2023 Parapan American Games =

- Flag of Haiti
- IPC code: HAI
- NPC: National Paralympic Committee of Haiti
- Website: www.paralympic.org/haiti

in Santiago, Chile 17 November 2023 – 26 November 2023
- Competitors: 1 in 1 sport
- Flag bearer (opening): Saraphina Delusme
- Flag bearer (closing): Saraphina Delusme
- Medals: Gold 0 Silver 0 Bronze 0 Total 0

Parapan American Games appearances
- 2007; 2011; 2015; 2019; 2023

Haiti is scheduled to compete in the 2023 Parapan American Games in Santiago, Chile from 17 November to 26 November 2023. This was Haiti's fifth appearance at the Parapan American Games, having first competed in the 2007 edition.

Paralympic athlete Saraphina Delusme was the country's flagbearer during the opening ceremony and the closing ceremony.

== Competitors ==
The following is the list of number of competitors (per gender) participating at the games per sport/discipline.

Sport	Men	Women	Total
Athletics	0	1	1
Total	0	1	1

== Athletics ==
Women

Track events

Athlete	Event	Semifinal		Final	
Athlete	Event	Result	Rank	Result	Rank
Saraphina Delusme	200 m T47	DNS		—	12

== See also ==
- Haiti at the 2023 Pan American Games
- Haiti at the 2024 Summer Paralympics
