= Paraguay at the 2023 Parapan American Games =

- Flag of Paraguay
- IPC code: PAR
- NPC: Paraguayan Paralympic Committee
- Website: comiteparalimpicoparaguayo.org.py

in Santiago, Chile 17 November 2023 – 26 November 2023
- Competitors: 3 in 3 sports
- Flag bearers: Iván Cáceres; Melissa Tillner
- Medals: Gold 0 Silver 0 Bronze 0 Total 0

Parapan American Games appearances (overview)
- 2007; 2011; 2015; 2019; 2023

Paraguay competed in the 2023 Parapan American Games in Santiago, Chile from 17 November to 26 November 2023. This was Paraguay's third appearance at the Parapan American Games, having first competed in the 2007 edition.

Paralympic cyclist Iván Cáceres and parathlete Melissa Tillner were the country's flagbearers during the opening ceremony.

== Competitors ==
The following is the list of number of competitors (per gender) participating at the games per sport/discipline.

Sport	Men	Women	Total
Athletics	0	1	1
Cycling	1	0	1
Swimming	1	0	1
Total	2	1	3

== Athletics ==
Women

Track events

Athlete	Event	Semifinal		Final	
Athlete	Event	Result	Rank	Result	Rank
Melissa Tillner	100 m T12	14.93	3	Did not advance	
Melissa Tillner	200 m T12	32.24	3	Did not advance	
Melissa Tillner	400 m T12	1:17.75	2	Did not advance	

== Cycling ==
=== Road ===
Men

Athlete	Event	Time	Rank
Iván Cáceres	Time trial H1–5	DSQ	
Iván Cáceres	Road race H3–5	–2 LAP	11

== Swimming ==
Men

Athlete	Event	Heat		Final	
Athlete	Event	Time	Rank	Time	Rank
Rodrigo Hermosa	50 m freestyle S9	30.10	11	Did not advance	
Rodrigo Hermosa	100 m breaststroke SB8	1:33.03	8 Q	1:33.84	8

== See also ==
- Paraguay at the 2023 Pan American Games
- Paraguay at the 2024 Summer Paralympics
