= Athletics at the 2015 Parapan American Games – Women's 100 metres T53 =

Athletics – Women's 100 metres T53 at the 2015 Parapan American Games
- Venue: CIBC Athletics Stadium
- Dates: August 12–13
- Competitors: 9 from 5 nations

Medalists
1st place, gold medalist(s)		Jessica Cooper Lewis	Bermuda
2nd place, silver medalist(s)		Ilana Dupont	Canada
3rd place, bronze medalist(s)		Jessica Frotten	Canada

The women's T53 100 metres competition of the athletics events at the 2015 Parapan American Games was held between August 12 and 13 at the CIBC Athletics Stadium. The defending Parapan American Games champion was Chelsea McClammer of the United States of America.

== Records ==
Prior to this competition, the existing records were as follows:

World record	Lisha Huang (CHN)	16.22	Beijing, China	September 12, 2008
Americas Record	Leann Shannon (USA)	16.23	Etobicoke, Canada	July 11, 1997

== Schedule ==
All times are Central Standard Time (UTC-6).

Date	Time	Round
12 August	17:23	Semifinal 1
12 August	17:29	Semifinal 2
13 August	18:30	Final

== Results ==
All times are shown in seconds.

KEY:	q	Fastest non-qualifiers	Q	Qualified	PR	Parapan American Games record	AR	Area record	NR	National record	PB	Personal best	SB	Seasonal best	DSQ	Disqualified	FS	False start

=== Semifinals ===
The fastest from three each heat and next two overall fastest qualified for the final.

==== Semifinal 1 ====
Wind: +2.9 m/s

Rank	Name	Nation	Time	Notes
1	Jessica Cooper Lewis	Bermuda	16.85	Q
2	Ilana Dupont	Canada	17.63	Q
3	Lucero Vazquez	Mexico	18.58	Q
4	Yadira Soturno	Venezuela	18.96	q
5	Yen Hoang	United States	19.73	

==== Semifinal 2 ====
Wind: +4.0 m/s

Rank	Name	Nation	Time	Notes
1	Jessica Frotten	Canada	18.34	Q
2	Jill Moore	United States	18.76	Q
3	Evelyn Enciso	United States	19.01	Q
4	Jessica Rogers	United States	19.08	q

=== Final ===
Wind: -1.1 m/s

Rank	Name	Nation	Time	Notes
1st place, gold medalist(s)	Jessica Cooper Lewis	Bermuda	17.64	PR
2nd place, silver medalist(s)	Ilana Dupont	Canada	18.63	
3rd place, bronze medalist(s)	Jessica Frotten	Canada	19.25	
4	Jill Moore	United States	19.36	
5	Lucero Vazquez	Mexico	19.47	
6	Evelyn Enciso	Mexico	19.74	
7	Yadira Soturno	Venezuela	20.04	
8	Jessica Rogers	United States	20.54	
