= 2005 Youth Parapan American Games =

Multi-Sport event for young athletes held in 2005

I Youth Parapan American Games
- Host: Barquisimeto, Venezuela
- Nations: 10
- Athletes: 1,000
- Events: 8 sports
- Opening: October 22
- Closing: October 30
- Main venue: El Salitre Coliseum

The 2005 Youth Parapan American Games were an international multi-sport event for athletes aged 12 to 21 with physical disabilities held from October 22 to October 30, 2005, in Barquisimeto, Venezuela. They were the first edition of the Youth Parapan American Games, created by the Americas Paralympic Committee after the 2003 Pan American Games in order to reduce the large average age gap between countries in the Americas.

Venezuela ended the games at the top of the medals table, with Mexico coming in second, Argentina in third, and Colombia in fourth. Other nation participants included Uruguay, Ecuador, and Bolivia.

== Sports ==
- Athletics ()
- Boccia ()
- Goalball ()
- Judo ()
- Swimming ()
- Table tennis ()
- Wheelchair basketball ()
- Wheelchair tennis ()
