= Bermuda at the 2019 Parapan American Games =

- Flag of Bermuda
- IPC code: BER

in Lima, Peru August 23, 2019 – September 1, 2019
- Competitors: 4 (2 men and 2 women) in 2 sports
- Flag bearers: Steve Wilson (Opening); Omar Hayward (Closing)
- Medals Ranked 13th: Gold 2 Silver 1 Bronze 0 Total 3

Parapan American Games appearances
- 1999; 2003; 2007; 2011; 2015; 2019; 2023

Bermuda competed at the 2019 Parapan American Games held from August 23 to September 1, 2019, in Lima, Peru. In total, athletes representing Bermuda won two gold medals and one silver medal. All medals were won in athletics by Jessica Cooper Lewis. The country finished in 13th place in the medal table.

== Medalists ==
Medal	Name	Sport	Event
Gold	Jessica Cooper Lewis	Athletics	Women's 100 metres T53
Gold	Jessica Cooper Lewis	Athletics	Women's 400 metres T53
Silver	Jessica Cooper Lewis	Athletics	Women's 800 metres T53

== Athletics ==
Jessica Cooper Lewis won the gold medals in women's 100 metres T53 and women's 400 metres T53 events.

She won the silver medal in the women's 800 metres T53 event.

== Boccia ==
Athletes representing Bermuda competed in the individual BC1 and individual BC4 events.
