= Haiti at the 2015 Parapan American Games =

- IOC code: HAI
- NOC: National Paralympic Committee of Haiti
- Website: http://www.paralympic.org/haiti

in Toronto 7–15 August 2015
- Competitors: 1 in 1 sport
- Flag bearer: Nephtalie Jn Louis (opening)
- Medals: Gold 0 Silver 0 Bronze 0 Total 0

Parapan American Games appearances
- 2007; 2011; 2015; 2019; 2023

Haiti participated in the 2015 Parapan American Games.

== Competitors ==
The following table lists Haiti's delegation per sport and gender.

Sport	Men	Women	Total
Powerlifting	0	1	1
Total	0	1	1

== Powerlifting ==
Women

Athlete	Event	Final	
Athlete	Event	Weight	Rank
Nephtalie Jn Louis	50 kg	NR	-
