= Guyana at the 2023 Parapan American Games =

- Flag of Guyana
- IPC code: GUY
- NPC: Guyanese Paralympic Committee
- Website: www.paralympic.org/guyana

in Santiago, Chile 17 November 2023 – 26 November 2023
- Competitors: 1 in 1 sport
- Flag bearer (opening): Gibran Sarfaraz
- Flag bearer (closing): Gibran Sarfaraz
- Medals: Gold 0 Silver 0 Bronze 0 Total 0

Parapan American Games appearances
- 2019; 2023

Guyana is scheduled to compete in the 2023 Parapan American Games in Santiago, Chile from 17 November to 26 November 2023. This was Guyana's second appearance at the Parapan American Games, having first competed in the 2019 edition.

Paralympic table tennis player Gibran Sarfaraz was the country's flagbearer during the opening ceremony and the closing ceremony.

== Competitors ==
The following is the list of number of competitors (per gender) participating at the games per sport/discipline.

Sport	Men	Women	Total
Table tennis	1	0	1
Total	1	0	1

== Table tennis ==
Men

Athlete	Event	Preliminaries			Quarterfinals	Semifinals	Final / BM	
Athlete	Event	Opposition Result	Opposition Result	Rank	Opposition Result	Opposition Result	Opposition Result	Rank
Gibran Sarfaraz	Singles C10	Puerto (COL); L 0–3	Muñoz (ESA); L 0–3	3	Did not advance			

== See also ==
- Guyana at the 2023 Pan American Games
