= Honduras at the 2023 Parapan American Games =

- Flag of Honduras
- IPC code: HON
- NPC: Honduran Paralympic Committee
- Website: www.paralympic.org/honduras

in Santiago, Chile 17 November 2023 – 26 November 2023
- Competitors: 2 in 2 sports
- Flag bearers: Derri Batiz; Allanis Galo
- Medals: Gold 0 Silver 0 Bronze 0 Total 0

Parapan American Games appearances
- 1999; 2003; 2007; 2011; 2015; 2019; 2023

Honduras is scheduled to compete in the 2023 Parapan American Games in Santiago, Chile from 17 November to 26 November 2023. This was Honduras' sixth appearance at the Parapan American Games.

Paralympic athlete Derri Batiz and powerlifter Allanis Galo were the country's flagbearers during the opening ceremony.

== Competitors ==
The following is the list of number of competitors (per gender) participating at the games per sport/discipline.

Sport	Men	Women	Total
Athletics	1	0	1
Powerlifting	0	1	1
Total	1	1	2

== Athletics ==
Men

Track events

Athlete	Event	Semifinal		Final	
Athlete	Event	Result	Rank	Result	Rank
Derri Batiz	100 m T13	—		13.83	7
Derri Batiz	400 m T13	—		1:03.59	7

== Powerlifting ==
Women

Athlete	Event	Total lifted	Rank
Allanis Galo	–86 kg & +86 kg	NM	

== See also ==
- Honduras at the 2023 Pan American Games
- Honduras at the 2024 Summer Paralympics
