= Valentina Muñoz =

Chilean Paralympic swimmer

Personal information
- Born: 11 May 2001 (age 25)

Sport
- Sport: Paralympic swimming
- Disability: Arthrogryposis
- Disability class: S8
Medal record
Representing Chile
Parapan American Games
Gold medal – first place	2019 Lima	100m backstroke S8

Valentina Muñoz Moreno (born 11 May 2001) is a Chilean Paralympic swimmer who competes in international swimming competitions. She is a Parapan American Games champion and has competed at the 2016 Summer Paralympics.

Muñoz is studying dietetics at Universidad Andres Bello.
