= Saint Vincent and the Grenadines at the 2023 Parapan American Games =

- Flag of Saint Vincent and the Grenadines
- IPC code: VIN
- NPC: Saint Vincent and the Grenadines Paralympic Committee
- Website: www.paralympic.org/saint-vincent-and-grenadines

in Santiago, Chile 17 November 2023 – 26 November 2023
- Competitors: 1 in 1 sport
- Flag bearer (opening): Kentreal Kydd
- Flag bearer (closing): Kentreal Kydd
- Medals: Gold 0 Silver 0 Bronze 0 Total 0

Parapan American Games appearances
- 2019; 2023

Saint Vincent and the Grenadines is scheduled to compete in the 2023 Parapan American Games in Santiago, Chile from 17 November to 26 November 2023. This was Saint Vincent and the Grenadines's second appearance at the Parapan American Games, having first competed in the 2019 edition.

Paralympic swimmer Kentreal Kydd was the country's flagbearer during the opening ceremony and the closing ceremony.

== Competitors ==
The following is the list of number of competitors (per gender) participating at the games per sport/discipline.

Sport	Men	Women	Total
Swimming	1	0	1
Total	1	0	1

== Swimming ==
Men

Athlete	Event	Heat		Final	
Athlete	Event	Time	Rank	Time	Rank
Kentreal Kydd	50 m freestyle S9	31.67	12	Did not advance	

== See also ==
- Saint Vincent and the Grenadines at the 2023 Pan American Games
- Saint Vincent and the Grenadines at the 2024 Summer Paralympics
