= Barbados at the 2023 Parapan American Games =

- Flag of Barbados
- IPC code: BAR
- NPC: Paralympic Association of Barbados
- Website: www.paralympic.org/barbados

in Santiago, Chile 17 November 2023 – 26 November 2023
- Competitors: 3 (1 man and 2 women) in 2 sports
- Flag bearers (opening): Antwahn Boyce-Vaughan; Talibah Davis
- Flag bearer (closing): Talibah Davis
- Medals: Gold 0 Silver 0 Bronze 0 Total 0

Parapan American Games appearances
- 1999; 2003; 2007; 2011; 2015; 2019; 2023

Barbados competed at the 2023 Parapan American Games in Santiago, Chile from 17 November to 26 November 2023. This was the country's sixth appearance at the Parapan American Games.

Paralympic swimmer Antwahn Boyce-Vaughan and para badminton athlete Talibah Davis were the country's flagbearers during the opening ceremony. Meanwhile, Talibah Davis was also the country's flagbearer during the closing ceremony.

== Competitors ==
The following is the list of number of competitors (per gender) who participated at the games per sport/discipline.

Sport	Men	Women	Total
Badminton	0	2	2
Swimming	1	0	1
Total	1	2	3

== Badminton ==
Women

Athlete	Event	Preliminaries			Semifinals	Final / BM	
Athlete	Event	Opposition Result	Opposition Result	Rank	Opposition Result	Opposition Result	Rank
Joy-Ann Clarke	Singles WH1	Burnett (USA); L 7–21, 3–21	Souza (BRA); L 0–21, 2–21	3	Did not advance		
Talibah Davis	Singles SL4	Meier (CAN); L 13–21, 8–21	Oliveira (BRA); L 7–21, 7–21	3	Did not advance		

== Swimming ==
Men

Athlete	Event	Heat		Final	
Athlete	Event	Time	Rank	Time	Rank
Antwahn Boyce-Vaughan	50 m freestyle S9	35.83	15	Did not advance	
Antwahn Boyce-Vaughan	100 m breaststroke SB8	DNS		Did not advance	

== See also ==
- Barbados at the 2023 Pan American Games
- Barbados at the 2024 Summer Paralympics
