= Boccia at the 2023 Parapan American Games – Women's individual BC1 =

Women's individual BC1 at the 2023 Parapan American Games
- Venue: Choose Healthy Living Center
- Dates: November 19 - November 22
- Competitors: 4 from 4 nations

Medalists
1st place, gold medalist(s)		Andreza de Oliveira	Brazil
2nd place, silver medalist(s)		Yushae Desilva-Andrade	Bermuda
3rd place, bronze medalist(s)		Ailén Flores	Argentina

The women's individual BC1 competition of the boccia events at the 2023 Parapan American Games was held on November 19 - 22 at the Choose Healthy Living Center (Centro Elige Vivir Sano) in of Lo Espejo, Chile.

== Schedule ==
Date	Time	Round
November 19 - 22, 2023	17:10	Pool A

== Results ==
=== Pool ===
The results were as follows:

==== Pool A ====
Athlete	Pld	W	L	PW	PA	Diff	Qualification
Andreza de Oliveira (BRA)	3	3	0	21	4	17	1st place, gold medalist(s)
Yushae Desilva-Andrade (BER)	3	2	1	11	7	4	2nd place, silver medalist(s)
Ailén Flores (ARG)	3	1	2	9	8	1	3rd place, bronze medalist(s)
Dayana Quiroz (ECU)	3	0	3	3	25	-22	

Date	Time	Player 1	Score	Player 2
November 19	17:10	Andreza de Oliveira (Brazil)	13–1	(Ecuador) Dayana Quiroz
November 19	17:10	Yushae Desilva-Andrade (Bermuda)	4–2	(Argentina) Ailén Flores
November 21	09:30	Andreza de Oliveira (Brazil)	5–0	(Argentina) Ailén Flores
November 21	09:30	Yushae Desilva-Andrade (Bermuda)	5–2	(Ecuador) Dayana Quiroz
November 22	14:00	Andreza de Oliveira (Brazil)	3*–3	(Bermuda) Yushae Desilva-Andrade
November 22	14:00	Ailén Flores (Argentina)	7–0	(Ecuador) Dayana Quiroz
