= Panama at the 2015 Parapan American Games =

- IOC code: PAN
- NOC: Paralympic Committee of Panama
- Website: https://www.paralympic.org/panama

in Toronto 7–15 August 2015
- Competitors: 5 in 2 sports
- Medals: Gold 0 Silver 0 Bronze 0 Total 0

Parapan American Games appearances
- 1999; 2003; 2007; 2011; 2015; 2019; 2023

Panama participated in the 2015 Parapan American Games.

== Competitors ==
The following table lists Panama's delegation per sport and gender.

Sport	Men	Women	Total
Athletics	4	0	0
Swimming	1	0	0
Total	5	0	5

== Athletics ==
Men

Athlete	Event		
Athlete	Event	Distance	Position
Raul Alberto Andrade Miranda	Men's Javelin Throw F56	26.81 PB	4
Raul Alberto Andrade Miranda	Men's Shot Put F56	7.09	6
Francisco Leonardo Cedeño Almengor	Men's Javelin Throw F53/54/55	22.64 PB	7
Francisco Leonardo Cedeño Almengor	Men's Shot Put F54/55	9.44	4
Luis Alberto Espinosa Santamaria	Men's Javelin Throw F34/57	26.44 PB	8
Luis Alberto Espinosa Santamaria	Men's Shot Put F57	10.13 PB	5
Ruben Adriano Lansiquot Walcott	Men's Javelin Throw F53/54/55	21.19	8
Ruben Adriano Lansiquot Walcott	Men's Shot Put F54/55	8.27	8

== Swimming ==
Men

Athlete	Event	Final	
Athlete	Event	Time	Rank
Cessar Barria	50m Freestyle S9	29.24	6
Cessar Barria	100m Freestyle S9	1:04.46	6
Cessar Barria	400m Freestyle S9	5:00:34	5
