= Honduras at the 2015 Parapan American Games =

- IOC code: HON
- NOC: Honduran Paralympic Committee
- Website: https://www.paralympic.org/honduras

in Toronto 7–15 August 2015
- Competitors: 4 in 3 sports
- Medals: Gold 0 Silver 0 Bronze 0 Total 0

Parapan American Games appearances
- 1999; 2003; 2007; 2011; 2015; 2019; 2023

Honduras participated in the 2015 Parapan American Games.

== Competitors ==
The following table lists Honduras's delegation per sport and gender.

Sport	Men	Women	Total
Athletics	1	0	1
Powerlifting	1	0	1
Swimming	1	1	2
Total	3	1	4

== Athletics ==
Men

Athlete	Event	Final	
Athlete	Event	Time	Rank
Carlos Velasquez	Men's 400m T38	1:03.72 PB	6

== Powerlifting ==
Men

Athlete	Event	Final	
Athlete	Event	Result	Rank
Robin Escobar	Men's 49–54 kg	No score	

== Swimming ==
Men

Athlete	Event	Heat		Final	
Athlete	Event	Time	Rank	Time	Rank
Emmanuel Enrrique Diaz	50m Freestyle S7	41.10	10	Did not advance	

Women

Athlete	Event	Final	
Athlete	Event	Time	Rank
Kenia Flores	100m Breaststroke SB9	DNS	
