= Bermuda at the 2015 Parapan American Games =

- IOC code: BER
- NOC: Bermuda Paralympic Association
- Website: https://www.paralympic.org/bermuda

in Toronto 7–15 August 2015
- Competitors: 3 in 2 sports
- Medals Ranked 13th: Gold 1 Silver 0 Bronze 0 Total 1

Parapan American Games appearances
- 1999; 2003; 2007; 2011; 2015; 2019; 2023

Barbados competed in the 2015 Parapan American Games.

== Competitors ==
The following table lists Bermuda's delegation per sport and gender.

Sport	Men	Women	Total
Athletics	0	1	1
Boccia	1	1	2
Total	1	2	3

== Medalists ==
The following competitors from Bermuda won medals at the games. In the by discipline sections below, medalists' names are bolded.

Medal	Name	Sport	Event	Date
Gold	Jessica Cooper Lewis	Athletics	Women's 100 m T53	August 13

**Medals by sport**
**Sport**	1st place, gold medalist(s)	2nd place, silver medalist(s)	3rd place, bronze medalist(s)	**Total**
Athletics	1	0	0	1
**Total**	**0**	**0**	**1**	**1**

**Medals by day**
**Day**	1st place, gold medalist(s)	2nd place, silver medalist(s)	3rd place, bronze medalist(s)	**Total**
August 13	1	0	0	1
**Total**	**1**	**0**	**0**	**1**

== Athletics ==
Women

Athlete	Event	Heat		Final	
Athlete	Event	Time	Rank	Time	Rank
**Jessica Cooper Lewis**	Women's 100 m T53	16.85 **Q**	1	17.67	1st place, gold medalist(s)
**Jessica Cooper Lewis**	Women's 400 m T53	1:04:98 **Q**	2	1:01:79	5
**Jessica Cooper Lewis**	Women's 800 m T53	—N/a		2:10:43	6

== Boccia ==
Athlete	Event	Preliminary Round			Quarterfinal	Semifinal	Final	Rank
Athlete	Event	Opposition Score	Opposition Score	Opposition Score	Opposition Score	Opposition Score	Opposition Score	Rank
Yushae Desilva-Andrade	Individual BC2	—N/a	Lucas Ferreira De Araujo (BRA); **L** (1-7)	Jesus Oseguera (URU); **L** (3-3*)	did not advance			5
Steve Wilson	Individual BC4	Alison Levine (CAN); **L** (0-10)	Dirceu Pinto (BRA); **L** (2-11)	Adolfo Diosdado (MEX); **W** (3-2)	did not advance			9

== See also ==
- Bermuda at the 2015 Pan American Games
