= 2025 Youth Parapan American Games =

International multi-sport event

VI Youth Parapan American Games
- Host: Santiago, Chile
- Nations: 27
- Athletes: 1500
- Events: 344 in 14 sports
- Opening: October 31
- Closing: November 9
- Main venue: Estadio Nacional Julio Martínez Prádanos (opening)
- Website: www.parapanjuvenileschile2025.org

The 2025 Youth Parapan American Games were the sixth edition of the Youth Parapan American Games, an international multi-sport event for para-athletes aged 17 to 22 in the Americas, organized by the Chilean Paralympic Committee and the Americas Paralympic Committee (APC). It was held in Santiago, Chile between October 31 and November 9, 2025.

== The Games ==
=== Participating nations ===
- Argentina (110)
- Bolivia (1)
- Brazil (120)
- Canada (39)
- Chile (112)
- Colombia (116)
- Costa Rica (14)
- Cuba (27)
- Dominican Republic (13)
- Ecuador (23)
- El Salvador (10)
- Grenada (1)
- Guatemala (22)
- Haiti (1)
- Honduras (2)
- Jamaica (3)
- Mexico (148)
- Nicaragua (5)
- Panama (16)
- Paraguay (11)
- Peru (40)
- Puerto Rico (8)
- Suriname (1)
- Trinidad and Tobago (2)
- United States (8)
- Uruguay (6)
- Venezuela (43)

=== Sports ===
- Archery (8)
- Athletics (114)
- Boccia (11)
- Football 5-a-side (1)
- Football 7-a-side (1)
- Goalball (2)
- Judo (8)
- Powerlifting (17)
- Sitting volleyball (2)
- Swimming (120)
- Table tennis (26)
- Wheelchair basketball
  - Wheelchair basketball (2)
  - 3x3 Wheelchair basketball (2)
- Wheelchair tennis (6)

== Medal table ==
* Host nation (Chile)

Rank	NPC	Gold	Silver	Bronze	Total
1	Brazil	61	29	10	100
2	Colombia	51	31	34	116
3	Mexico	36	32	32	100
4	Chile*	25	31	33	89
5	Ecuador	20	8	7	35
6	Venezuela	14	14	11	39
7	Cuba	12	14	4	30
8	Argentina	9	23	33	65
9	Peru	8	12	3	23
10	Canada	6	3	4	13
11	Costa Rica	3	5	4	12
12	Puerto Rico	3	1	5	9
13	United States	3	0	0	3
14	El Salvador	2	0	5	7
15	Panama	1	4	8	13
16	Dominican Republic	1	2	6	9
17	Guatemala	0	2	5	7
18	Nicaragua	0	2	3	5
19	Uruguay	0	1	1	2
20	Jamaica	0	0	1	1
Totals (20 entries)		255	214	209	678

== See also ==
- 2025 Junior Pan American Games
- 2025 Central American Games
