= Barbados at the 2015 Parapan American Games =

- IOC code: BAR
- NOC: Paralympic Association of Barbados
- Website: http://www.paralympic.org/barbados

in Toronto 7–15 August 2015
- Competitors: 1 in 1 sport
- Flag bearer: David Taylor (opening)
- Medals: Gold 0 Silver 0 Bronze 0 Total 0

Parapan American Games appearances
- 1999; 2003; 2007; 2011; 2015; 2019; 2023

Barbados participated in the 2015 Parapan American Games.

== Competitors ==
The following table lists Barbados' delegation per sport and gender.

Sport	Men	Women	Total
Swimming	1	0	1
Total	1	0	1

== Swimming ==
Men

Athlete	Event	Heat		Final	
Athlete	Event	Time	Rank	Time	Rank
David Taylor	50 m freestyle S9	—N/a		40.30	8
David Taylor	100 m breaststroke SB8	2:37:29	9	Did not advance	

== See also ==
- Barbados at the 2015 Pan American Games
