= Football 5-a-side at the 2015 Parapan American Games =

- Venue: Pan Am / Parapan Am Fields
- Dates: 8–14 August 2015
- Competitors: 59 from 6 nations

Football 5-a-side event at the 2015 Parapan American Games was played from 8–14 August 2015 at the Pan Am / Parapan Am Fields in Toronto.

== Participating nations ==
- Argentina (10)
- Brazil (10)
- Chile (10)
- Colombia (10)
- Mexico (9)
- Uruguay (10)

== Medal summary ==
=== Medal table ===
| Rank | Nation | Gold | Silver | Bronze | Total |
|---|---|---|---|---|---|
| 1 | Brazil | 1 | 0 | 0 | 1 |
| 2 | Argentina | 0 | 1 | 0 | 1 |
| 3 | Mexico | 0 | 0 | 1 | 1 |
| Totals (3 entries) | | 1 | 1 | 1 | 3 |

=== Medal events ===
| Event | Gold | Silver | Bronze |
|---|---|---|---|
| Men's | Brazil (BRA); Luan de Lacerda; Cássio Lopes dos Reis; Liwisgton Da Silva Costa; Damião Robson; Marcos Alves Felipe; Jeferson da Conceição; Raimundo Nonato Alves Mendes; Tiago da Silva; Ricardo Steinmetz Alves; Vinícius Tranchezzi | Argentina (ARG); Darío Lencina; Angel Deldo Garcia; Federico Acardi; Koki Padilla; Silvio Velo; Lucas Rodriguez; David Peralta; Nico Veliz; German Muleck; Maximiliano Espinillo | Mexico (MEX); Javier Amozurrutia; Fancisco Rangel; Pablo Millan; Marco Ramirez; Tadeo Viera; Felipe Arana; Jorge Lanzagorta; Omar Otero; Cristian Ortiz |

== Results ==
=== Group stage ===
| Team | Pld | W | D | L | GF | GA | GD | Pts | Qualification |
|---|---|---|---|---|---|---|---|---|---|
| Brazil | 5 | 4 | 1 | 0 | 17 | 0 | +17 | 13 | Gold medal match |
| Argentina | 5 | 3 | 2 | 0 | 10 | 1 | +9 | 11 | Gold medal match |
| Colombia | 5 | 2 | 2 | 1 | 7 | 5 | +2 | 8 | Bronze medal match |
| Mexico | 5 | 2 | 0 | 3 | 3 | 9 | −6 | 6 | Bronze medal match |
| Uruguay | 5 | 0 | 2 | 3 | 1 | 12 | −11 | 2 | |
| Chile | 5 | 0 | 1 | 4 | 1 | 12 | −11 | 1 | |

Source: Summary
2015-08-08
16:00

| Uruguay | 0–6 | Argentina |
|---|---|---|
| | Report |

2015-08-08
18:00

| Brazil | 6–0 | Chile |
|---|---|---|
| | Report |

2015-08-08
20:00

| Colombia | 3–0 | Mexico |
|---|---|---|
| | Report |

2015-08-09
16:00

| Brazil | 3–0 | Colombia |
|---|---|---|
| | Report |

2015-08-09
18:00

| Argentina | 1–0 | Mexico |
|---|---|---|
| | Report |

2015-08-09
20:00

| Uruguay | 0–0 | Chile |
|---|---|---|
| | Report |

2015-08-10
16:00

| Mexico | 2–1 | Chile |
|---|---|---|
| | Report |

2015-08-10
18:00

| Uruguay | 0–4 | Brazil |
|---|---|---|
| | Report |

2015-08-10
20:00

| Colombia | 1–1 | Argentina |
|---|---|---|
| | Report |

2015-08-12
16:00

| Uruguay | 0–1 | Mexico |
|---|---|---|
| | Report |

2015-08-12
18:00

| Brazil | 0–0 | Argentina |
|---|---|---|
| | Report |

2015-08-12
20:00

| Chile | 0–2 | Colombia |
|---|---|---|
| | Report |

2015-08-13
16:00

| Uruguay | 1–1 | Colombia |
|---|---|---|
| | Report |

2015-08-13
18:00

| Argentina | 2–0 | Chile |
|---|---|---|
| | Report |

2015-08-13
20:00

| Mexico | 0–4 | Brazil |
|---|---|---|
| | Report |

=== Finals ===
| Gold Medal Match |
| August 14 |
| Argentina | 1 |
| Brazil | 2 |

| Bronze Medal Match |
| August 14 |
| Colombia | 1 (0) |
| Mexico (p) | 1 (1) |

==== Bronze medal match ====
2015-08-14
16:00

| Colombia | 1 – 1 | Mexico |
|---|---|---|
| | Report |
Penalties
| | 0 – 1 |

==== Gold medal match ====
2015-08-14
18:00

| Argentina | 1–2 | Brazil |
|---|---|---|
| | Report |

== See also ==
- Football at the 2015 Pan American Games
