= Suriname at the 2015 Parapan American Games =

- IOC code: SUR
- NOC: National Paralympic Committee of Suriname
- Website: http://paralympic.org/suriname

in Toronto 7–15 August 2015
- Competitors: 2 in 2 sports
- Medals: Gold 0 Silver 0 Bronze 0 Total 0

Parapan American Games appearances
- 1999; 2003; 2007; 2011; 2015; 2019; 2023

Suriname competed in the 2015 Parapan American Games.

== Competitors ==
The following table lists Suriname's delegation per sport and gender.

Sport	Men	Women	Total
Athletics	1	0	1
Swimming	1	0	1
Total	2	0	2

== Athletics ==
Men

Athlete	Event	Heat		Final	
Athlete	Event	Time	Rank	Time	Rank
Biondi Misasi	Men's 100 m T12	11.81	3	did not advance	

Athlete	Event	#1	#2	#3	#4	#5	#6	Mark	Wind	Rank
Biondi Misasi	Men's Long Jump T11/12	4.53	5.94	5.85	5.90	6.15	6.35	6.35	+2.8	4

== Swimming ==
Men

Athlete	Event	Final	
Athlete	Event	Time	Rank
Sefanja Hankers	Men's 100 m Breaststroke SB13(12-13)	1:35.51	8
Sefanja Hankers	Men's 50 m Freestyle S12	31.67	8
