= Barbados at the 2019 Parapan American Games =

- IOC code: BAR
- NOC: Barbados Paralympic Committee
- Website: http://www.paralympic.org/barbados

in Lima 23 August – 1 September 2019
- Competitors: 1 in 1 sport
- Medals: Gold 0 Silver 0 Bronze 0 Total 0

Parapan American Games appearances
- 1999; 2003; 2007; 2011; 2015; 2019; 2023

Barbados participated in the 2019 Parapan American Games. They sent the same size delegation as the previous games.

== Competitors ==
The following table lists Barbados's delegation per sport and gender.

Sport	Men	Women	Total
Athletics	1	0	1
Total	1	0	1

== Athletics ==
Athlete	Event	Final	
Athlete	Event	Distance	Position
Sean Cooke	Men's Shot Put F32/33/34	6.08	7
