= Uruguay at the 2015 Parapan American Games =

- IOC code: URU
- NOC: Comité Paralímpico Uruguayo
- Website: comiteparalimpicouruguay.org

in Toronto 7–15 August 2015
- Competitors: 12
- Medals Ranked 13th: Gold 1 Silver 0 Bronze 0 Total 1

Parapan American Games appearances
- 1999; 2003; 2007; 2011; 2015; 2019; 2023

Uruguay participated in the 2015 Parapan American Games.

== Competitors ==
The following table lists Uruguay's delegation per sport and gender.

Sport	Men	Women	Total
Football 5-a-side	10	0	10
Judo	1	0	1
Swimming	1	0	1
Total	12	0	12

== Medalists ==
The following competitors from Uruguay won medals at the games. In the by discipline sections below, medalists' names are bolded.

Medal	Name	Sport	Event	Date
Gold	Henry Borges	Judo	Men's 60 kg	August 12

Medals by sport
**Sport**	1st place, gold medalist(s)	2nd place, silver medalist(s)	3rd place, bronze medalist(s)	Total
Judo	1	0	0	1
Total	1	0	0	1

Medals by day
**Day**	1st place, gold medalist(s)	2nd place, silver medalist(s)	3rd place, bronze medalist(s)	**Total**
August 12	1	0	0	1
Total	1	0	0	1

== Football 5-a-side ==
Uruguay will send a team of eight athletes to compete.

- Pablo Bertoche
- Anthony Da Luz Gonzalez
- Jonathan Delgado Martinez
- Mauro Diaz Canaveris
- Gonzalo Lapachian
- Santiago Lopez Garcia
- Paulo Muino
- Gustavo Sanabria Trias
- Marcelo Silva Irisarri
- Arel Sirin

Preliminary Round

Team	P	W	D	L	G	GA	GD	Points
Brazil (BRA)	5	4	1	0	17	0	+17	13
Argentina (ARG)	5	3	2	0	10	1	+9	11
Colombia (COL)	5	2	2	1	7	5	+2	8
Mexico (MEX)	5	2	0	3	3	9	-6	6
Uruguay (URU)	5	0	2	3	1	12	-11	2
Chile (CHI)	5	0	1	4	1	12	-11	1

Qualified to Gold Medal Match
Qualified to Bronze Medal Match
08 August
16:00

Uruguay	0 – 6	Argentina
	Report	Rodriguez 4' 48'; Velo 13' 46'; Padilla 25'; Espinillo 27'

Referee: Lucio Morgado (BRA)

09 August
20:00

Uruguay	0 – 0	Chile
	Report

Referee: Mariano Travaglino (ARG)

10 August
18:00

Uruguay	0 – 4	Brazil
	Report	Steinmetz Alvez 9'; Alves Mendes 13'; De Conceicao 23'; Da Silva 49'

Referee: Francois Carcouet (FRA)

12 August
16:00

Uruguay	0 – 1	Mexico
	Report	Arana 7'

Referee: Lucio Morgado (BRA)

13 August
16:00

Uruguay	1 – 1	Colombia
Da Luz 28'	Report	Lopez 13'

Referee: Francois Carcouet (FRA)

2015 Parapan American Games Fifth Place

**Uruguay**

== Judo ==
Uruguay sent a male athlete to compete.

Athlete	Event	Round of 16	Quarterfinals	Semifinals	Final	Rank
Athlete	Event	Opposition Result	Opposition Result	Opposition Result	Opposition Result	Rank
**Henry Borges**	60 kg	Castellanos (COL); **W** **001**-000	Karn (CAN); **W** **000S1**-000S2	Hawthorne (USA); **W** **100S2**-000S1	Gauto (ARG); **W** **011S1**-000S1	1st place, gold medalist(s)

== Swimming ==
Uruguay sent a male swimmer to compete.

Athletes	Event	Final	
Athletes	Event	Time	Rank
Gonzalo Dutra	100m Freestyle S10	59.21	**7th**
Gonzalo Dutra	100m Breaststroke SB9	1:18.29	**6th**

== See also ==
- Uruguay at the 2016 Summer Paralympics
- Uruguay at the 2015 Pan American Games
