= Virgin Islands at the 2015 Parapan American Games =

- IOC code: ISV
- NOC: National Paralympic Committee US Virgin Islands
- Website: http://www.paralympic.org/us-virgin-islands

in Toronto 7–15 August 2015
- Competitors: 1 in 1 sport
- Flag bearer: Ivan Espinosa (opening)
- Medals: Gold 0 Silver 0 Bronze 0 Total 0

Parapan American Games appearances
- 2015; 2019; 2023

The Virgin Islands competed in the 2015 Parapan American Games.

== Competitors ==
The following table lists Virgin Islands's delegation per sport and gender.

Sport	Men	Women	Total
Athletics	1	0	1
Total	1	0	1

== Athletics ==
Men

Athlete	Event	Final	
Athlete	Event	Time	Rank
Ivan Espinosa	Men's 1500 m T38	5:25.05	8
