= 2009 Youth Parapan American Games =

II Youth Parapan American Games
- Host: Bogotá, Colombia
- Nations: 14
- Athletes: 700
- Events: 9 sports
- Opening: October 17
- Closing: October 22
- Main venue: El Salitre Coliseum

The 2009 Youth Parapan American Games were a multi-sport event held from October 15 to October 23, 2009, in Bogotá, Colombia. They were the second edition of the Youth Parapan American Games, and they were organized by the Colombian Paralympic Committee (CPC) and the International Paralympic Committee (IPC).

== Organization ==
=== Venues ===
All of the game's events took place in Simón Bolívar Park. The opening ceremony took place in the El Salitre Coliseum.

Venue	Location	Sports
Sports Palace	Simón Bolívar Park	Athletics; Goalball
El Salitre Coliseum	Simón Bolívar Park	Wheelchair basketball
High Performance Center	Simón Bolívar Park	Football 7-a-side Judo; Powerlifting; Table tennis Wheelchair tennis
Simón Bolívar Aquatic Complex	Simón Bolívar Park	Swimming

=== Mascot ===
The mascot of the Bogotá 2009 Youth Parapan American Games was an iguana. According to the organizing committee, "the iguana serves as a symbol for people with disabilities because they can supply their limitations, developing skills and aptitudes according to the environment in which they find themselves and taking their abilities beyond their limits. ... The iguana is part of our Parapanamerican culture."

== The Games ==
=== Participating nations ===
- Argentina (88)
- Brazil (90)
- Chile (5)
- Colombia (104)
- Dominican Republic (5)
- Ecuador (9)
- Guatemala (6)
- Honduras (6)
- Mexico (81)
- Nicaragua (5)
- Panama (6)
- United States (12)
- Uruguay (5)
- Venezuela (130)

=== Sports ===
- Athletics
- Football 7-a-side
- Goalball
- Judo
- Powerlifting
- Swimming
- Table tennis
- Wheelchair basketball
- Wheelchair tennis

=== Calendar ===
OC	Opening ceremony	Event competitions	CC	Closing ceremony

October	17 Sun	18 Sun	19 Mon	20 Tues	21 Wed	22 Thu
Ceremonies	OC					CC
Athletics						
Football 7-a-side						
Goalball						
Judo						
Powerlifting						
Swimming						
Table tennis						
Wheelchair basketball						
Wheelchair tennis						
October	17 Sun	18 Sun	19 Mon	20 Tues	21 Wed	22 Thu

=== Medals table ===
* Host nation (Colombia)

Rank	Nation	Gold	Silver	Bronze	Total
1	Brazil (BRA)	80	39	14	133
2	Mexico (MEX)	51	47	43	141
3	Argentina (ARG)	48	38	25	111
4	Colombia (COL)*	34	35	33	102
5	Venezuela (VEN)	25	37	22	84
6	United States (USA)	24	13	7	44
7	Panama (PAN)	2	2	1	5
8	Guatemala (GUA)	2	1	5	8
9	Uruguay (URU)	1	4	1	6
10	Chile (CHI)	1	1	2	4
11	Nicaragua (NCA)	0	3	3	6
12	Ecuador (ECU)	0	2	4	6
13	Honduras (HON)	0	0	1	1
Totals (13 entries)		268	222	161	651

Source: Coldeportes
