= Brazil at the 2025 Youth Parapan American Games =

- IPC code: BRA
- NPC: Brazilian Paralympic Committee
- Website: www.cpb.org.br

in Santiago, Chile 31 October 2025 – 9 November 2025
- Competitors: 120 in 13 sports
- Medals Ranked 1st: Gold 61 Silver 29 Bronze 10 Total 100

Youth Parapan American Games appearances
- auto

Brazil competed in the 2025 Youth Parapan American Games in Santiago, Chile from 31 October to 9 November 2025.

== Competitors ==
The following is the list of number of competitors (per gender) participating at the games per sport/discipline.

Sport	Men	Women	Total
Archery	1	1	2
Athletics	10	9	19
Boccia	4	4	8
Football 5-a-side	8	—N/a	8
Football 7-a-side	12	—N/a	12
Goalball	6	6	12
Judo	3	3	6
Powerlifting	7	6	13
Sitting volleyball	4	4	8
Table tennis	8	5	13
Wheelchair basketball	12	4	16
Wheelchair tennis	2	1	3
Total	77	43	120

== Archery ==
Men

Athlete	Event	Ranking Round		Quarterfinals	Semifinals	Final / BM	
Athlete	Event	Score	Seed	Opposition Score	Opposition Score	Opposition Score	Rank
Filipe Aguiar	Individual recurve open	461	2	Ramirez (CHI); W 6–0	Figueroa (VEN); W 6–0	Osorio (COL); L 2–6	2nd place, silver medalist(s)

Women

Athlete	Event	Ranking Round		Quarterfinals	Semifinals	Final / BM	
Athlete	Event	Score	Seed	Opposition Score	Opposition Score	Opposition Score	Rank
Nathalia Carvalho	Individual recurve open	385	4	Neyra (PER); W 6–0	Mosquera (COL); L 0–6	Bronze medal final Aguilera (CHI)	4

Mixed

Athlete	Event	Ranking Round		Quarterfinals	Semifinals	Final / BM	
Athlete	Event	Score	Seed	Opposition Score	Opposition Score	Opposition Score	Rank
Filipe Aguiar; Nathalia Carvalho	Team recurve open	846	2	Bye	Mexico	Colombia; L 0–6	2nd place, silver medalist(s)

== Athletics ==
Key

- Note–Ranks given for track events are within the athlete's heat only
- Q = Qualified for the next round
- q = Qualified for the next round as a fastest loser
- N/A = Round not applicable for the event
- Bye = Athlete not required to compete in round

Men

Track events

Athlete	Event	Semifinal		Final	
Athlete	Event	Result	Rank	Result	Rank
Bruno Alves	100 m T13				
Daniel Fernandes	100 m T35				
Fabrício Klein	100 m T37				
Luis Fernando da Silva	100 m T38				
Eduardo Bento	100 m T54				
Daniel Fernandes	200 m T35				
Fabrício Klein	200 m T36/T37/T38				
João Pedro Dantas	400 m T11				
Alex Felix	400 m T20				
Fabrício Klein	400 m T37				
Luis Fernando da Silva	400 m T38				
Eduardo Bento	400 m T54				
Alex Felix	800 m T20				
Eduardo Bento	800 m T54				

Women

Track events

Athlete	Event	Semifinal		Final	
Athlete	Event	Result	Rank	Result	Rank
Maria Clara Araújo	100 m T35				
Ana Carolina Souza	100 m T35/T36/T37				
Geovana Fanton	100 m T35/T36/T37				
Isadora Rosa	100 m T46				
Maria Alyce Lucena	100 m T46				
Laryssa Silva	100 m T47				
Maria Clara Araújo	200 m T35				
Ana Carolina Souza	200 m T37				
Isadora Rosa	200 m T46				
Laryssa Silva	200 m T47				
Alanny Silva	400 m T20				
Geovana Fanton	400 m T37/T38				
Maria Alyce Lucena	400 m T46				
Laryssa Silva	400 m T47				

== Boccia ==
Men

Athlete	Event	Pool matches				Quarterfinals	Semifinals	Final / BM	
Athlete	Event	Opposition Score	Opposition Score	Opposition Score	Rank	Opposition Score	Opposition Score	Opposition Score	Rank
Samuel de Souza	Individual BC1								
Eduardo Vasconcelos	Individual BC2								
Gabriel Serafim	Individual BC3								
José Antônio Santos	Individual BC4								

Women

Athlete	Event	Pool matches				Quarterfinals	Semifinals	Final / BM	
Athlete	Event	Opposition Score	Opposition Score	Opposition Score	Rank	Opposition Score	Opposition Score	Opposition Score	Rank
Gabrielly Nascimento	Individual BC1								
Clarice Sobreira	Individual BC2								
Luiza Vitoria Silva	Individual BC3								
Joice Lira	Individual BC4								

Mixed

Athlete	Event	Pool matches				Semifinals	Final / BM	
Athlete	Event	Opposition Score	Opposition Score	Opposition Score	Rank	Opposition Score	Opposition Score	Rank
Eduardo Vasconcelos; Samuel de Souza; Clarice Sobreira; Gabrielly Nascimento	Team BC1–BC2							
Gabriel Serafim; Luiza Vitoria Silva	Pairs BC3							
José Antônio Santos; Joice Lira	Pairs BC4							

== Football 5-a-side ==
Summary

Team	Event	Group stage						Final / BM	
Team	Event	Opposition Score	Opposition Score	Opposition Score	Opposition Score	Opposition Score	Rank	Opposition Score	Rank
Brazil men's	Men's tournament	Mexico	Chile	Colombia	Argentina	Peru			

== Football 7-a-side ==
Summary

Team	Event	Group stage					Final / BM	
Team	Event	Opposition Score	Opposition Score	Opposition Score	Opposition Score	Rank	Opposition Score	Rank
Brazil men's	Men's tournament	Mexico	Colombia	Argentina	Chile			

== Goalball ==
Summary

Team	Event	Group stage						Final / BM	
Team	Event	Opposition Score	Opposition Score	Opposition Score	Opposition Score	Opposition Score	Rank	Opposition Score	Rank
Brazil men's	Men's tournament	Argentina; D 5–5	Canada; W 8–3	Colombia; W 13–3	Mexico; W 8–6	Chile; W 10–0	1 FG	Argentina	
Brazil women's	Women's tournament	Argentina; W 8–5	Canada; W 5–3	Mexico; W 6–5	Chile; W 6–1	Guatemala; W 10–0	1 FG	Canada	

== Judo ==
Men

Athlete	Event	Round of 16	Quarterfinals	Semifinals	Repechage 1	Repechage 2	Final / BM	
Athlete	Event	Opposition Result	Opposition Result	Opposition Result	Opposition Result	Opposition Result	Opposition Result	Rank
Gabriel Rodrigues	−62 kg & –70 kg							
José Cleberson Santos	−62 kg & –70 kg							
Emerson de Aguiar	−81 kg & +81 kg							

Women

Athlete	Event	Round of 16	Quarterfinals	Semifinals	Repechage 1	Repechage 2	Final / BM	
Athlete	Event	Opposition Result	Opposition Result	Opposition Result	Opposition Result	Opposition Result	Opposition Result	Rank
Wiliany Nascimento	−52 kg & –60 kg							
Giovana Rodrigues	−52 kg & –60 kg							
Millena Freitas	+60 kg							

== Sitting volleyball ==
Summary

Team	Event	Group stage					Semifinal	Final / BM	
Team	Event	Opposition Score	Opposition Score	Opposition Score	Opposition Score	Rank	Opposition Score	Opposition Score	Rank
Brazil men's	Men's tournament	Mexico	Colombia	Argentina	Venezuela				
Brazil women's	Women's tournament	Mexico	United States	Argentina	—N/a				

== Wheelchair basketball ==
=== 5x5 ===
Summary

Team	Event	Group stage						Semifinal	Final / BM	
Team	Event	Opposition Score	Opposition Score	Opposition Score	Opposition Score	Opposition Score	Rank	Opposition Score	Opposition Score	Rank
Brazil men's	Men's tournament	Canada; L 34–76	Argentina; L 34–48	Mexico; W 63–47	Colombia	Chile				

=== 3x3 ===
Summary

Team	Event	Preliminary round						Semifinal	Final / BM	
Team	Event	Opposition Score	Opposition Score	Opposition Score	Opposition Score	Opposition Score	Rank	Opposition Score	Opposition Score	Rank
Brazil women's	Women's tournament	Chile; W 6–1	Argentina; L 1–6	Mexico; W 3–2	Colombia; L 2–6	Canada				

== Wheelchair tennis ==
Men

Athlete	Event	Group round				Round of 16	Quarterfinals	Semifinals	Final / BM	
Athlete	Event	Opposition Result	Opposition Result	Opposition Result	Rank	Opposition Result	Opposition Result	Opposition Result	Opposition Result	Rank
Lucas Dutra	Singles	—N/a				Aguilar (PER); W 6–2, 6–0	Quintero (COL); W 3–6, 7–6, 6–3	Llovet (URU)		
Luiz Calixto	Singles	—N/a				Bye	Lezama (ARG); W 6–0, 6–1	Martínez (COL)		
Lucas Dutra; Luiz Calixto	Doubles	Davidson / Lezama (ARG); W 6–1, 6–0	Aguilar / Alberca (PER); W 6–0, 6–0	Martínez / Quintero (COL)		—N/a				

Women

Athlete	Event	Group round				
Athlete	Event	Opposition Result	Opposition Result	Opposition Result	Opposition Result	Rank
Vitória Miranda	Singles	Valenzuela (PER); W 6–0, 6–0	Baos (COL)			

Mixed

Athlete	Event	Quarterfinals	Semifinals	Final / BM	
Athlete	Event	Opposition Result	Opposition Result	Opposition Result	Rank
Luiz Calixto; Vitória Miranda	Doubles	Bye			
