= Jessica Cooper Lewis =

Bermudian Paralympic athlete (born 1993)

Jessica Lewis
Personal information
- Full name: Jessica Cooper Lewis
- Born: 3 April 1993 (age 33) Warwick Parish, Bermuda
- Height: 150 cm (4 ft 11 in)

Sport
- Country: Bermuda
- Sport: Paralympic athletics
- Disability: Diastematomyelia
- Disability class: T53
- Club: Cruisers Sports
- Coached by: Ken Thom (2006–2017); Curtis Thom (2017–)
Medal record
Paralympic athletics
Representing Bermuda
World Championships
| Bronze medal – third place | 2015 Doha | Women's 100m T53 |
Commonwealth Games
| Bronze medal – third place | 2026 Glasgow | Women's 400m T53/T54 |
Parapan American Games
| Gold medal – first place | 2015 Toronto | Women's 100m T53 |
| Gold medal – first place | 2019 Lima | Women's 100m T53 |
| Gold medal – first place | 2019 Lima | Women's 400m T53 |
| Gold medal – first place | 2023 Santigo | Women's 100m T53 |
| Silver medal – second place | 2019 Lima | Women's 800m T53 |

Jessica Cooper Lewis (born 3 April 1993) is a Bermudian Paralympic athlete who competes in mainly 400 metres and 800 metres events. She qualified for the 2020 Summer Paralympics, in Women's 100 m T53.

She has competed in three Parapan American Games in which she has won four medals and four Paralympic Games where she was the first ever Paralympic athlete from Bermuda to compete in the Games when she made her debut appearance in 2012 Summer Paralympics. She competed at the 2015 IPC Athletics World Championships in Doha, winning the bronze medal in the T53 100m.

At the 2026 Commonwealth Games in Glasgow, as Bermuda's first Paralympic athlete at the Games, she won bronze in the 400m T53/T54 combined event.
