= Haiti at the 2011 Parapan American Games =

Sporting event delegation

Haiti participated in the 2011 Parapan American Games.

== Athletics ==
Haiti sent three male athletes to compete.

== Cycling ==
Haiti sent one male athlete to compete in the road cycling tournament.
