= Paraguayan Paralympic Committee =

National Paralympic Committee of Paraguay

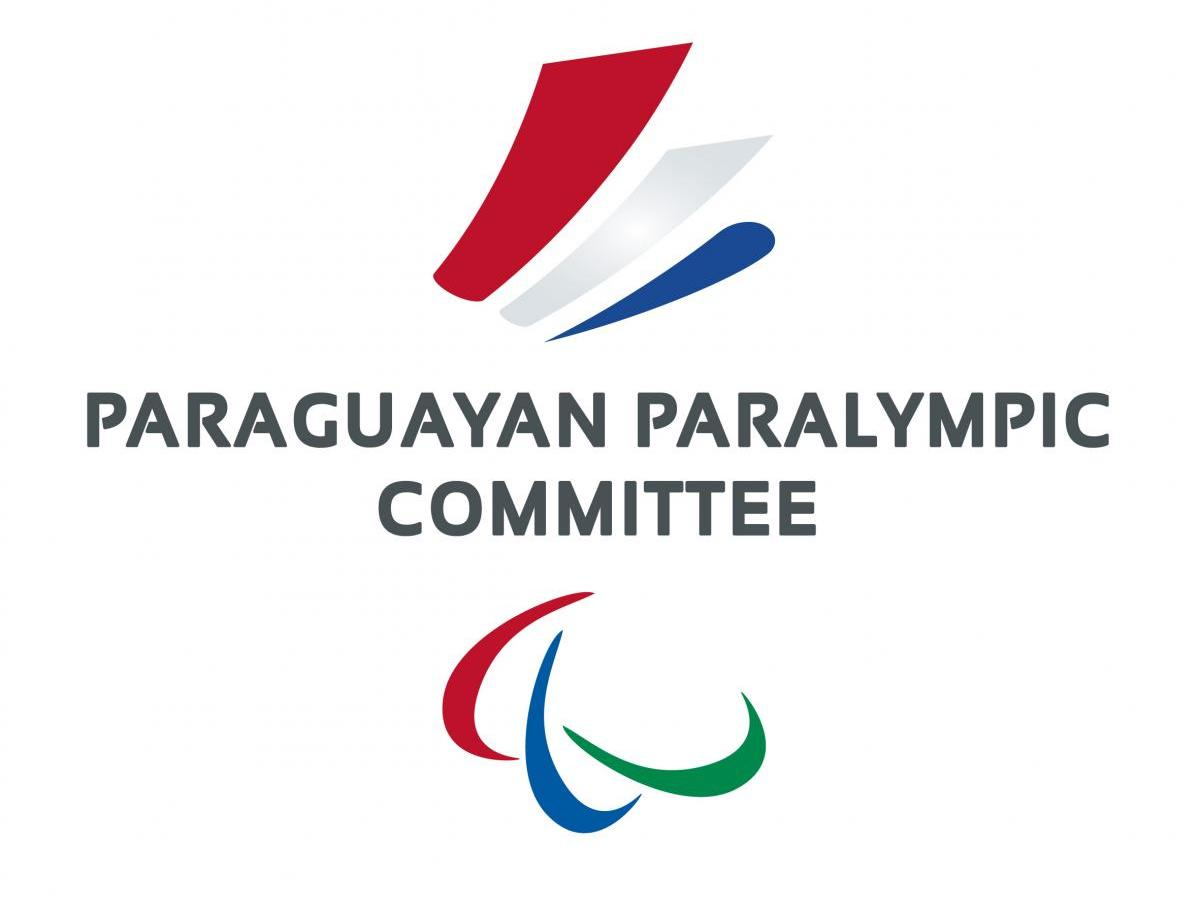

National Paralympic Committee
- Country: Paraguay
- Code: PAR
- Created: 2018
- Headquarters: Luque, Paraguay
- President: Juan Manuel Fernández
- Website: comiteparalimpicoparaguayo.org.py

The Paraguayan Paralympic Committee (Spanish: Comité Paralímpico Paraguayo) is the National Paralympic Committee for Paraguay, and is responsible for the local parasports activities in the country as well as its participation in the Paralympic Games. It became a member of the International Paralympic Committee in October 2019, becoming the 33rd member from the Americas.
