= 2003 Parapan American Games =

2nd Pan American Games

II Parapan American Games
- Host: Mar del Plata, Argentina
- Nations: 28
- Athletes: 1,500
- Events: 9 sports
- Opening: December 3
- Closing: December 10

The 2003 Parapan American Games, officially the II Pan American Games, were a major international multi-sport event for athletes with disabilities, celebrated in the tradition of the Parapan American Games as governed by the Americas Paralympic Committee in Mar del Plata, Argentina. Over 1,500 athletes from 28 countries competed in the games. The games served as a qualifier for the 2004 Summer Paralympics. For the second time, the Parapan American Games were held in the same year but at a different location than the Pan American Games; however, the games were initially supposed to be held in the Dominican Republic, but they were unable to host them due financial problems and infrastructure failures. This was the last year that the two events would be held in different cities, as the 2007 Parapan American Games and 2007 Pan American Games were both held in Rio de Janeiro.

== The Games ==
=== Venues ===
Venue	Sports
Estadio Atlético Panamericano	Athletics
Complejo Chapadmalal	Boccia
Club Hípico/Ecuestre Mar del Plata	Equestrian
CEF 1 – Hotel Provincial	Wheelchair fencing
Natatorio Panamericano	Swimming
Club Náutico Mar del Plata	Wheelchair tennis
OAM y Colegio Einstein	Sitting volleyball

Source: IPC

=== Sports ===
- Athletics
- Boccia
- Cycling
- Equestrian
- Sitting volleyball
- Swimming
- Wheelchair basketball
- Wheelchair tennis
- Wheelchair fencing

=== Medal table ===
* Host nation (Argentina)

Rank	Nation	Gold	Silver	Bronze	Total
1	Mexico (MEX)	101	74	45	220
2	Brazil (BRA)	81	53	31	165
3	Argentina (ARG)*	49	48	41	138
4	Venezuela (VEN)	30	20	22	72
5	Canada (CAN)	13	7	3	23
6	United States (USA)	10	8	6	24
7	Colombia (COL)	5	6	9	20
8	Uruguay (URU)	4	3	2	9
9	Costa Rica (CRC)	4	1	2	7
10	Peru (PER)	2	2	2	6
11	Cuba (CUB)	2	0	1	3
12	Chile (CHI)	1	5	6	12
13	Ecuador (ECU)	1	1	1	3
14	Bolivia (BOL)	0	1	1	2
Totals (14 entries)		303	229	172	704

== See also ==
2003 Pan American Games
