= 2023 Parapan American Games =

7th edition of the Parapan American Games

VII Parapan American Games
- Logo of the 2023 Parapan American Games
- Host: Santiago, Chile
- Motto: Our Meeting Point; Spanish: Nuestro Punto de Encuentro
- Nations: 31
- Athletes: 1,943
- Events: 380 in 17 sports
- Opening: 17 November
- Closing: 26 November
- Opened by: President Gabriel Boric
- Cauldron lighter: Cristian Valenzuela
- Main venue: Estadio Nacional Julio Martínez Prádanos (Opening ceremony); Museo Nacional Aeronáutico y del Espacio (Closing ceremony)
- Website: www.santiago2023.org/en

The 2023 Parapan American Games, officially the VII Pan American Games and commonly known as the Santiago 2023 Parapan-Am Games, were an international multi-sport event for athletes with disabilities. It celebrated the tradition of the Parapan American Games as governed by the Americas Paralympic Committee and was held from 17 to 26 November 2023 in Santiago, Chile.

== Bidding process ==
Two bids were submitted for the 2023 Pan American Games. Santiago, Chile and Buenos Aires, Argentina both submitted bids. On February 1, 2017, the Pan American Sports Organization (now Panam Sports) announced the two cities as the official bids. Buenos Aires withdrew their bid in April 2017 due to not having the necessary finances or logistics to host this event and the 2018 Summer Youth Olympics.

=== Host city election ===
Santiago was unanimously acclaimed as the host city at the ANOC General Assembly in Prague on November 4, 2017. This will mark the first time Chile hosts the Pan and Parapan American Games. Santiago was initially awarded the right to host the 1975 and later 1987 Pan American Games, but withdrew as host both times due to financial and political problems. Most recently, Santiago was a candidate for the 2019 Parapan American Games but lost to Lima.

Bidding results
City	NOC name	Votes
Santiago	Chile	Unanimous

== Development and preparation ==
=== Budget ===
The budget for the Games is $507 million USD, with $170 million reserved for the building of ten new sporting venues and the upgrade of six arenas. The budget is about 36% of what was spent for the 2015 Pan American Games in Toronto, Canada and 50% of the last Pan American Games in 2019, in Lima, Peru.

=== Venues ===
Various venues across Santiago and the metropolitan region will host the Games.

In June 2022, organizers revealed the final plan consisting of 14 venues. And all venues are located in the Santiago area, some often will be used in an exclusive way at the Games.

=== Athletes Village ===
In December 2021, a ceremony was held to lay the first brick for the village. The village is expected to cost approximately $100 million USD, and will consist of 1,345 apartments. After the games, the village will be converted to social housing. The village is being built in the Cerrillos Bicentennial Park community of Santiago.

=== Global Accessibility Innovations ===
In a groundbreaking move worldwide, the 2023 Parapan American Games introduced AI-generated audio diplomas for visually impaired and blind athletes. Utilizing a unique 50-second recording of Julio César Ávila, President of the Americas Paralympic Committee, artificial intelligence technology was employed to create personalized audio diplomas for over 500 athletes. This innovation not only enhanced the recognition of athletes' achievements but also set a new standard for inclusivity and accessibility in international sports events.

==== Sample Audio Diplomas ====
- English Audio Diploma for Anthony Simon Ferraro
- Spanish Audio Diploma for Analuz Pellitero

This initiative underscores the commitment of the Americas Paralympic Committee to leveraging cutting-edge technology to promote inclusivity and accessibility in sports.

== The Games ==
=== Ceremonies ===
The opening ceremony was held on November 17, 2023, at the Estadio Nacional do Chile, while the closing ceremony was held on November 26, 2023, in Parapan-American Village, located at the Bicentennial Park of Cerrillos.

==== Opening ceremony ====
There were formal moments such as cultural presentations, a parade of delegations affiliated to Americas Paralympic Committee, welcome speeches by members of PanAm Sports and the International Paralympic Committee, in addition to the inauguration of the Parapan-American cauldron.

Among the musical performances, the following artists participated: Anita Tijoux, Beto Cuevas, Denise Rosenthal, Flor de Rap, Kya, Movimento Original and Pablo Chill-E. Both Anita Tijoux and the group Movimiento Original have already performed at the opening of the Pan American Games.

==== Closing ceremony ====
The closing ceremony was held on the night of November 26, 2023 in the ceremonial area of the Cerrillos Bicentennial Park, where the Pan-American Village was built. As the protocol determines, their cultural presentations, the parade of flags by members of Americas Paralympic Committee, thank-you and closing speeches by members of APC, the tributes and the thanks to the volunteers and the handover ceremony of the APC flag to the authorities of next host city, which until then would be the city of Barranquilla, Colombia. containing also the presentation of figures about Colombian culture and the There was also a 15-minute cultural demonstration of Colombian culture and the ceremony ended with the cauldron extinction. Among the musical performances, the groups Santaferia, Banda Conmoción and Los Ramblers and the singers Princesa Alba and Gepe participated. However, this presentation and the passing of the flag became null and void on January 24, 2024, as a result of the revocation of the Colombian city's rights as host of the 2027 Pan and Parapan American Games. A few days later, on March 12 of the same year, Pan-Am Sports decided to hand over the Games to the Peruvian capital Lima.

=== Participating National Paralympic Committees ===
Thirty-one National Paralympic Committees will participate at the Games. Grenada made their debut appearance at the Parapan American Games. The Virgin Islands returned to participate after last competing in the 2015 edition. Suriname, which last participated in the 2019 edition, was absent.

Participating National Paralympic Committees
- Argentina (206)
- Aruba (1)
- Barbados (3)
- Bermuda (3)
- Brazil (327)
- Canada (135)
- Chile (166) (Host)
- Colombia (176)
- Costa Rica (29)
- Cuba (52)
- Dominican Republic (22)
- Ecuador (36)
- El Salvador (22)
- Grenada (3)
- Guatemala (21)
- Guyana (1)
- Haiti (1)
- Honduras (2)
- Jamaica (3)
- Mexico (186)
- Nicaragua (2)
- Panama (22)
- Paraguay (3)
- Peru (89)
- Puerto Rico (25)
- Saint Vincent and the Grenadines (1)
- Trinidad and Tobago (1)
- United States (240)
- Uruguay (11)
- Venezuela (97)
- Virgin Islands (1)

==== Number of athletes by National Paralympic Committee ====
IPC Code	Country	Athletes
BRA	Brazil	327
USA	United States	240
ARG	Argentina	206
MEX	Mexico	186
COL	Colombia	176
CHI	Chile	166
CAN	Canada	135
VEN	Venezuela	97
PER	Peru	89
CUB	Cuba	52
ECU	Ecuador	36
CRC	Costa Rica	29
PUR	Puerto Rico	25
DOM	Dominican Republic	22
ESA	El Salvador	22
PAN	Panama	22
GUA	Guatemala	21
URU	Uruguay	11
BAR	Barbados	3
BER	Bermuda	3
GRN	Grenada	3
JAM	Jamaica	3
PAR	Paraguay	3
HON	Honduras	2
NCA	Nicaragua	2
ARU	Aruba	1
GUY	Guyana	1
HAI	Haiti	1
TTO	Trinidad and Tobago	1
VIN	Saint Vincent and the Grenadines	1
ISV	Virgin Islands	1

=== Sports ===
Following the rules of the Americas Paralympic Committee, in which a maximum of 17 sports can be part of the Games program. Thus, 378 finals were held in 16 Paralympic sports and one regional sport. Due to the recent record of their athletes, the organizers decided to replace sitting volleyball with archery. It is noted that this is the first time in history that the sport has been outside the Parapan American Games sporting program. The removal of the sport was also due to the fact that Chile does not have a national federation of the sport. Thus, the Pan-American Sports Federation held an extra edition of the Sitting Volleyball Pan American Championship was held between 9 and 13 May 2023 to define the representatives of the Americas at the 2024 Summer Paralympics.

- Archery (8)
- Athletics (114)
- Badminton (16)
- Boccia (11)
- Cycling
  - Road (16)
  - Track (10)
- Football 5-a-side (1)
- Football 7-a-side (1)
- Goalball (2)
- Judo (8)
- Powerlifting (17)
- Shooting (9)
- Swimming (120)
- Table tennis (26)
- Taekwondo (10)
- Wheelchair basketball (2)
- Wheelchair rugby (1)
- Wheelchair tennis (6)

== Calendar ==
OC	Opening ceremony	●	Event competitions	1	Event finals	CC	Closing ceremony

November		16th Thu	17th Fri	18th Sat	19th Sun	20th Mon	21st Tue	22nd Wed	23rd Thu	24th Fri	25th Sat	26th Sun	Medal events
Ceremonies (opening / closing)			OC									CC	—N/a
Archery					●	●	2	6					8
Athletics							20	25	22	22	25		114
Badminton								●	●	1	7	8	16
Boccia					●	●	●	8	●	●	3		11
Cycling	Road				7							9	16
Cycling	Track								4	6			10
Football 5-a-side				●	●	●		●	●		1		1
Football 7-a-side				●	●	●		●	●		1		1
Goalball				●	●	●	●	●	●	2			2
Judo					4	4							8
Powerlifting				6	5	5	1						17
Shooting				2	2	3	2						9
Swimming				19	15	17	14	22	15	18			120
Table tennis		●	●	16	●	10							26
Taekwondo									3	4	3		10
Wheelchair basketball				●	●	●	●	●	●	1	1		2
Wheelchair rugby				●	●	●	●	●	1				1
Wheelchair tennis					●	●	●	●	1	3	2		6
Daily medal events				43	33	39	39	61	46	57	43	17	378
Cumulative total				43	76	115	154	215	261	318	361	378	378
		16th Thu	17th Fri	18th Sat	19th Sun	20th Mon	21st Tue	22nd Wed	23rd Thu	24th Fri	25th Sat	26th Sun	Medal events

== Medal table ==
Key

* Host nation (Chile)

Rank	NPC	Gold	Silver	Bronze	Total
1	Brazil	156	98	89	343
2	United States	55	58	53	166
3	Colombia	50	58	53	161
4	Mexico	29	46	50	125
5	Argentina	25	36	52	113
6	Chile*	16	20	15	51
7	Cuba	12	8	15	35
8	Canada	9	15	28	52
9	Ecuador	7	7	5	19
10	Venezuela	6	12	16	34
11–21	Remaining NPCs	13	21	31	65
Totals (21 entries)		378	379	407	1,164

== Marketing ==
The Games share most of its branding with the 2023 Pan American Games, including its emblem unveiled in July 2019, and its mascot Fiu—a many-colored rush tyrant—which was announced on October 16, 2021, following an online poll.

== See also ==
- 2023 Pan American Games
- 2024 Summer Paralympics

Preceded by Lima	VII Parapan American Games; Santiago (2023)	Succeeded by Lima
