= 2015 Parapan American Games =

5th edition of the Parapan American Games

V Parapan American Games
- Host: Toronto, Canada
- Motto: United We Play
- Nations: 28
- Athletes: 1,651
- Events: 317 in 15 sports
- Opening: August 7
- Closing: August 15
- Opened by: Governor General David Johnston
- Cauldron lighter: Chantal Peticlerc
- Main venue: Pan Am and Parapan Am; Athletics Stadium (opening ceremony); Nathan Phillips Square (closing ceremony)

The 2015 Parapan American Games, officially the V Parapan American Games and commonly known as the Toronto 2015 ParaPan-Am Games, were a major international multi-sport event for athletes with disabilities, celebrated in the tradition of the Parapan American Games as governed by the Americas Paralympic Committee, held from August 7 to 15, 2015, in Toronto, Ontario, Canada. Marking the first Parapan American games hosted by Canada, and the second major Paralympic sports event hosted by Toronto since the 1976 Summer Paralympics, the Games were held at venues in Toronto and four other Golden Horseshoe communities. Both the Parapan American and Pan American Games were organized by the Toronto 2015 Organizing Committee (TO2015). Toronto became the first city to host the Summer Paralympics and Parapan American Games.

The Games hosted 1,608 athletes representing 28 National Paralympic Committees (NPCs) in the Americas. 445 events were held in 15 sports—all of which serving as qualifiers for the 2016 Summer Paralympics, including the debut of wheelchair rugby at the Parapan American Games, and the return of 7-a-side football following its absence from the 2011 Parapan American Games.

== Bidding process ==
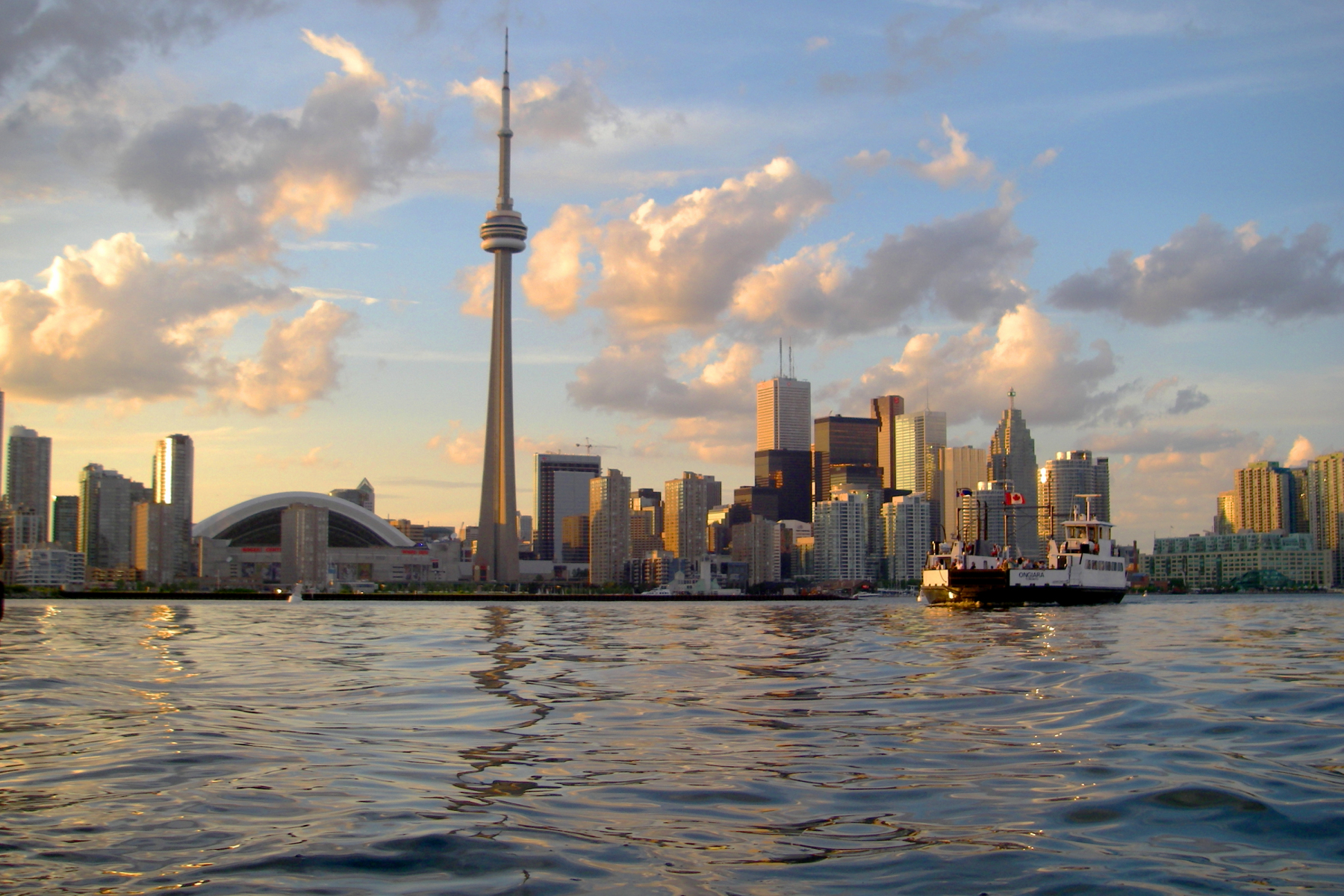
Toronto was selected by the Canadian Olympic Committee as the official bid city from Canada for the 2015 Parapan American Games

The Canadian Olympic Committee chose Toronto and the surrounding region as the Canadian candidate. No other Canadian city was given a chance to bid in a domestic race, and thus Toronto was selected without a vote. Toronto's interest in bidding came after failing to land the 1996 Summer Olympics and the 2008 Summer Olympics, which were held in Atlanta and Beijing respectively.

On February 23, 2009, both Toronto City Council and Hamilton City Council approved the bid officially and confirmed their intentions to support the successful hosting of the event. The official bid book document was submitted to the Pan American Sports Organization (PASO) on May 27, 2009.

PASO made an evaluation visit to Toronto between August 30 and 31, 2009. The team analyzed the candidate city features and provided its feedback back to voting members of PASO. The evaluation committee was headed by Julio Maglione, a member of the IOC representing Uruguay and the head of Fédération Internationale de Natation (FINA), the international swimming federation. After the visit Maglione said, "Toronto has all the conditions to play host to the Pan American Games".

Toronto won the bidding process to host the Pan and Parapan American Games by a vote of the Pan American Sports Organization on November 6, 2009, at the PASO Session held in Guadalajara, Mexico. The result was announced by PASO President Mario Vázquez Raña. Toronto faced two other finalists shortlisted Lima, Peru, and Bogotá, Colombia. Toronto earned 33 votes, while contesting candidate cities Lima and Bogotá received 11 and 7 votes, respectively.

2015 Parapan American Games bidding results
City	NOC	Round 1
Toronto	Canada	33
Lima	Peru	11
Bogotá	Colombia	7

== Development and preparation ==
=== Venues ===
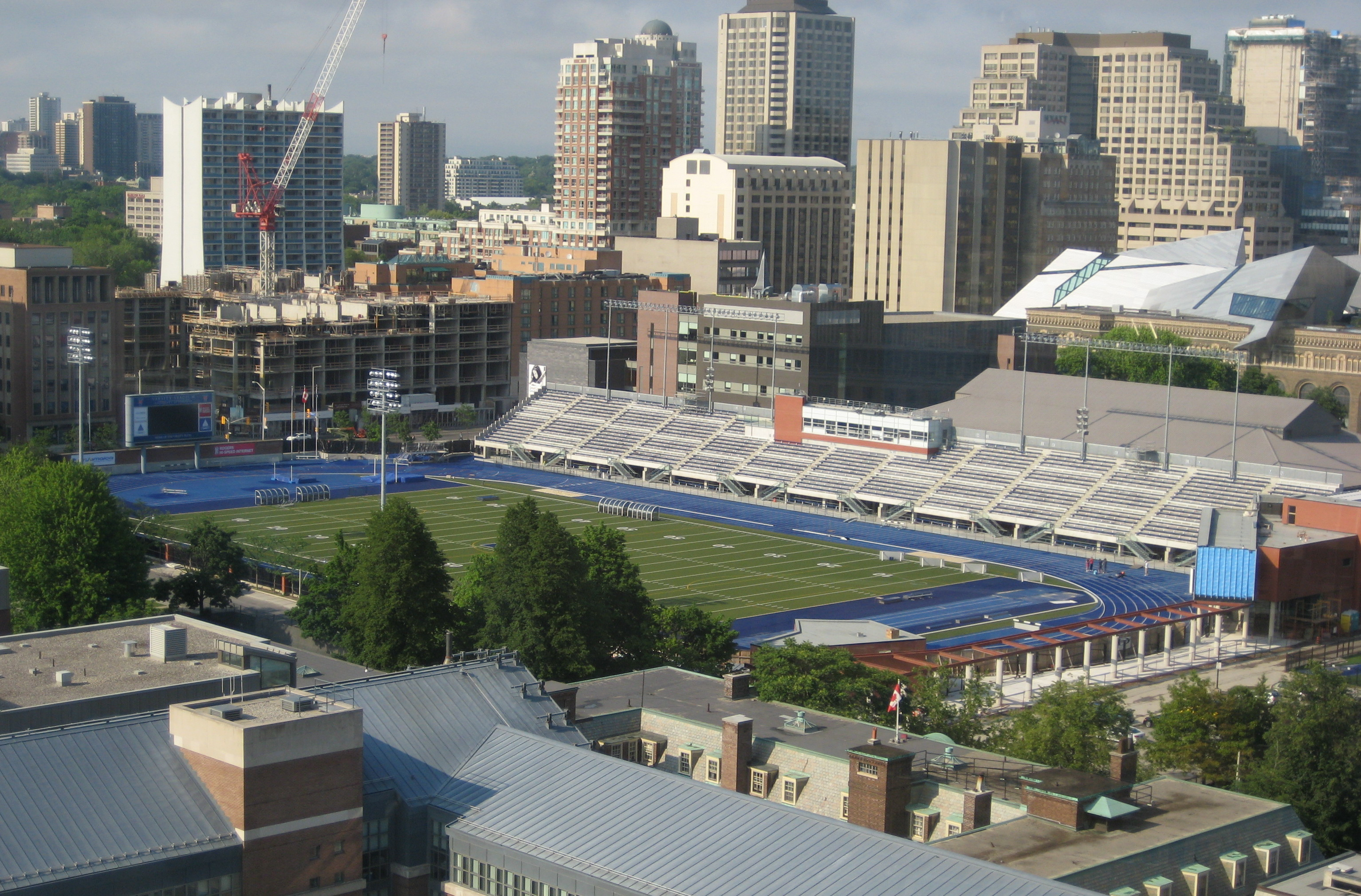
Varsity Stadium: The archery venue.

Toronto became one of the most populous cities to ever hold the Parapan American Games. In August, the month when the Games was held, Toronto has an average temperature of 21 °C (70 °F). Toronto's summer temperatures around August are warm, and the city averages less than five days with the temperature going above 30 °C (86 °F). As well in August Toronto averages about 67mm of precipitation. Moreover, Toronto's elevation is at 112 m (367 ft) above sea level, which provides optimal and ideal conditions for athletes.

In January 2012, the organizing committee announced that sixty percent of the originally proposed venues would be dropped, in favour of a clustering system seen at other multi-sport events such as the 2012 Summer Olympics in London, Great Britain.

Athletes' living quarters were at the 2015 Pan American Games Athletes' Village.

The opening ceremonies was held at the CIBC Pan Am and Parapan Am Athletics Stadium and the closing ceremonies was held at Nathan Phillips Square. The Parapan Games re-used 12 venues from the Pan Am Games while one venue University of Toronto Scarborough Tennis Centre was newly constructed for the Parapan Am Games. Some of the competition venues in the Toronto area included the Pan American Field Hockey Centre, and the Toronto Pan Am Sports Centre. Only four competition venues were located outside of Toronto:

- Markham Pan Am Centre in Markham
- Mississauga Sports Centre in Mississauga
- Mattamy National Cycling Centre in Milton, Ontario
- Abilities Centre in Whitby

=== Infrastructure and budget ===
The Toronto 2015 Organizing Committee (TO2015) along with all three levels of government spent about $1.4 billion Canadian dollars in upgrading and building new venues in the region. The provincial government (Ontario) and the Canadian federal government provided 35% each of the funding, with the municipalities covering the remaining 30% of the cost. Also $1 billion Canadian dollars was spent on building an athletes' village in the West Don Lands area of Toronto. Therefore, the total cost was $2.4 billion, the highest ever spent for a Pan/Parapan American Games. Later in 2011 Toronto's contribution to the games almost doubled from $49.5 million to $96.5 million for several reasons: the athletics stadium was moved to York University from Hamilton, the soil was to be remediated at the University of Toronto Scarborough where the proposed aquatics centre is supposed to be built, more money was needed for the proposed BMX track and the increase in inflation. $700 million Canadian dollars was spent to build and renovate infrastructure in the region, about three times what was spent for the 2011 Pan American Games.

Many transit improvements in Toronto were made in time for these games. These included the Union Pearson Express airport rail link.

=== Village ===
The Athlete's village cost $735 million CAD and had the capacity to hold up to 7,200 athletes and officials. After the games the village was converted to 746 market priced condos, 41 market-priced town homes, 250 affordable-rent apartments, 257 student dormitory units for George Brown College, office and retail units, and a YMCA recreation centre. The Athlete's Village was located in the West Don Lands along Front Street between Bayview Avenue and Cherry Street in Toronto. The development was certified LEED Gold.

=== Medals ===
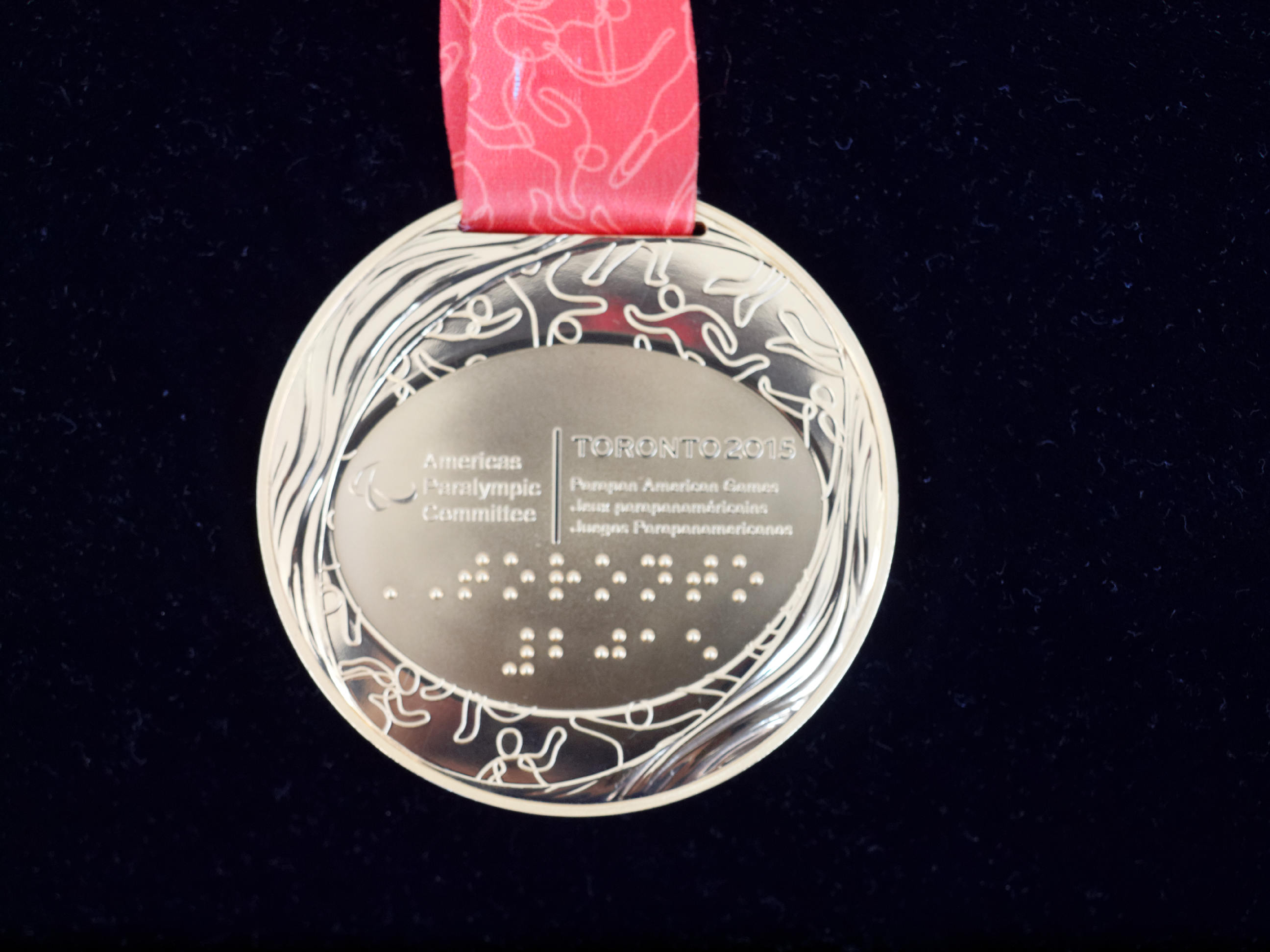
Braile on the back of a 2015 Parapan American Games Medal

In October 2013 it was announced that the medals for the games would be produced and designed by the Royal Canadian Mint. In September 2014 it was announced that the supplier of the raw minerals used in the medals (over 4,000 in total) would be Barrick Mining. All the materials used in the medals will come from the company's operations in the Americas region. The copper was mined at the company's Zaldivar mine in Chile, the silver at the Pueblo Viejo mine in the Dominican Republic and the gold was mined at the Hemlo mine in Northern Ontario.

The designs of the medals, created by artist Christi Belcourt were revealed on March 3, 2015, at a ceremony at the Royal Ontario Museum. Each of them are roughly 86.7 millimetres in diameter and weigh about 350 grams. The front of the medal featured three shapes representing three regions of the Americas: North America, Central America and the Caribbean, and South America. It also featured Braille for the first time. The back of the medal featured the logo and motto of the games and the elements of mokume-gane.

=== Volunteers ===
The organization committee expected 23,000 volunteers to be required for Pan Am and Parapan Am Games. Over 63,000 applicants applied to become a volunteer. A total of 6,688 volunteers participated as part of the Games.

=== Ticketing ===
Ticket sales began on March 25, 2015. More than 90,000 out of the 200,000 tickets available were sold.

=== Torch relay ===
The Parapan torch relay consisted of a 5-day journey, visiting 12 communities. Two torches were lit, one in the west at Niagara Falls and one in the east at Ottawa. Both make their way towards and reunite in Toronto.

== Marketing ==
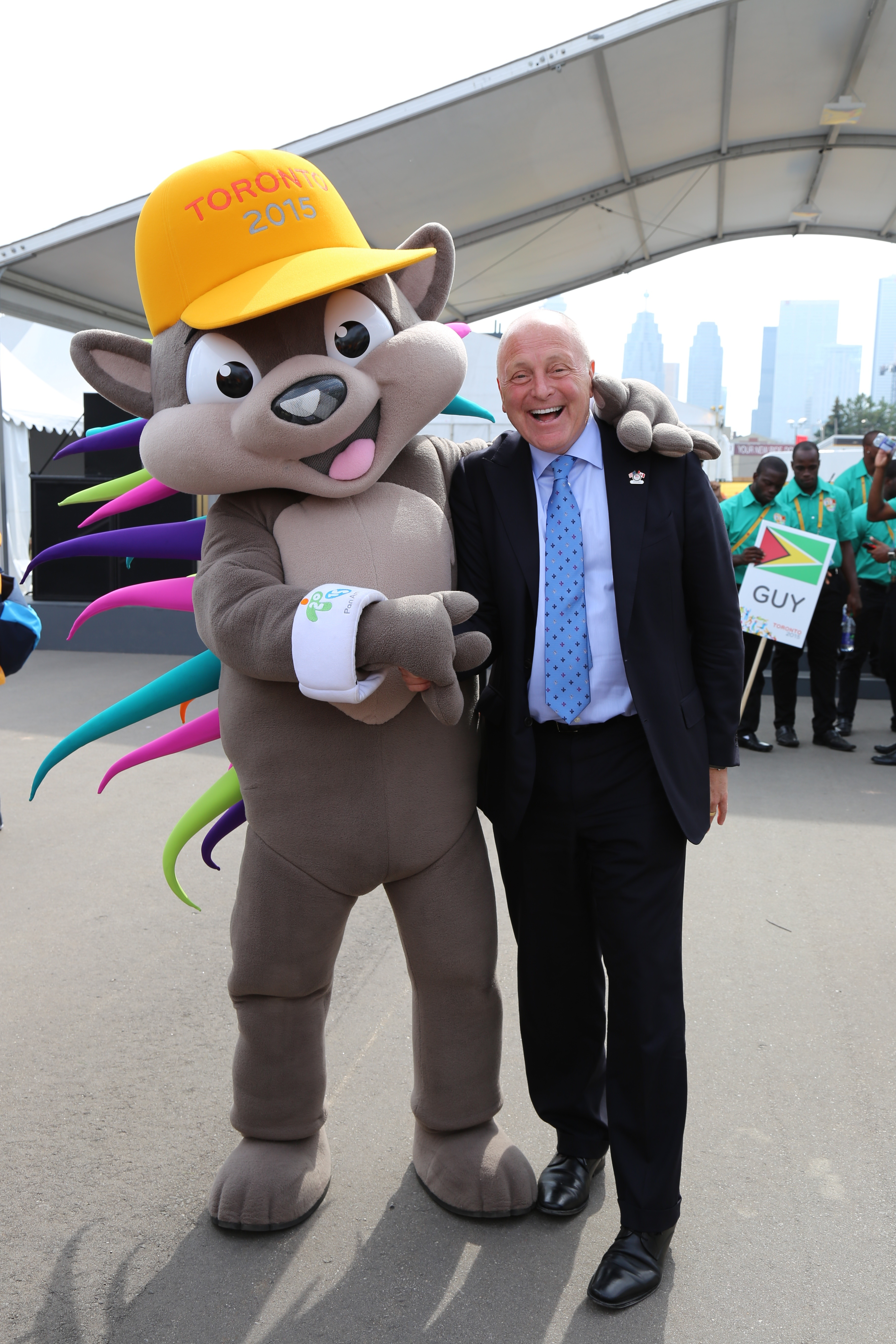
Pachi greets US Ambassador Bruce Heyman at the 2015 Pan American Games

=== Mascot ===
Pachi was chosen as the Games mascot in 2013. The design was based on porcupine. Porcupines have relatively poor vision, so the choice of basing Pachi's design on a porcupine is said to be a symbolic bond with the athletes of the Parapan Games.

== The Games ==
=== Ceremonies ===
The opening ceremony was held on August 7, 2015, at the CIBC Pan Am and Parapan Am Athletics Stadium, while the closing ceremony was held on 15 August 2015 at Nathan Phillips Square.

==== Opening ceremony ====
Before the ceremony began, the president of the Americas Paralympic Committee, Jose Luis Campo and Governor General David Johnston were introduced and entered the box of honour officially. This was followed by a countdown of number 20 to 0.

A rendition of Canada's national anthem was performed by Franco-Ontarian Gabrielle Goulet during the raising of the flag of the host country by the Royal Canadian Mounted Police and the Ontario Provincial Police and after that, a Lockheed C-130 Hercules of the Royal Canadian Air Force flew past over the stadium.

The ceremony began with an introductory performance called Migration of honour which represents the four elements of life: earth, water, wind and fire. It featured acrobatic dancers and performers from country's four ancestral nations - The Mississaugas of the New Credit First Nation, the Huron-Wendat Nation, the Six Nations of the Grand River and the Métis Nation of Ontario. The performance was followed immediately by the Parade of Nations. Each teams marched into the stadium, preceded by a person carrying a circular placard written with the name of each participating team in the three languages (English, French and Spanish). The Canadian delegation entered last, representing the host nation. The remaining countries entered in English alphabetical order.

During the ceremony, Americas Paralympic Committee (APC) flag was carried into the stadium by Arnold Boldt, Tim McIsaac, Chelsey Gotell, Paul Rosen, Robert Hampson, David Shannon, Patrick Jarvis and Dr. Robert Steadward and raised to the Paralympic Anthem. Toronto 2015 chief executive Saäd Rafi and APC president Jose gave their speeches before Governor General David Johnston declare the games opened. Benoit Huot read the athletes’ oath, while cycling coach Sebastien Travers read the coaches oath. The ceremony featured dance and song performances produced by B5C Productions in a joint venture between local company BaAM Productions and American-based FiveCurrents, which symbolized unity through diversity. During the final torch relay, the flame was brought in by activist and athlete Rick Hansen and Canadian Broadcasting Corporation (CBC) program host Rick Mercer and passed to wheelchair racer Chantal Petitclerc who lit the cauldron. The ceremony concluded with Francesco Yates performing songs from debut album.

==== Parade of Nations ====
Order	Nation	Spanish	French	Flag bearer	Sport
1	Argentina (ARG)	Argentina	Argentine	Rodrigo Lopez	Cycling
2	Aruba (ARU)	Aruba	Aruba	Albertino Maduro	Athletics
3	Barbados (BAR)	Barbados	Barbade	David Taylor	Swimming
4	Bermuda (BER)	Bermuda	Bermudes	Yushae DeSilva-Andrade	Boccia
5	Brazil (BRA)	Brasil	Brésil	Terezinha Guilhermina	Athletics
6	Chile (CHI)	Chile	Chili	Cristian Valenzuela	Athletics
7	Colombia (COL)	Colombia	Colombie	Carlos Daniel Serrano	Swimming
8	Costa Rica (CRC)	Costa Rica	Costa Rica	Jose Jimenez Hernandez	Athletics
9	Cuba (CUB)	Cuba	Cuba	Yunidis Castillo	Athletics
10	Dominican Republic (DOM)	República Dominicana	République dominicaine	Wemerson Garcia De La Rosa	Athletics
11	Ecuador (ECU)	Ecuador	Equateur	Darwin Castro	Athletics
12	El Salvador (ESA)	El Salvador	Salvador	Gabriel Espinoza Macal	Table tennis
13	Guatemala (GUA)	Guatemala	Guatemala	Isaac Leiva Avila	Athletics
14	Haiti (HAI)	Haití	Haïti	Nephtalie Jean-Louis	Athletics
15	Honduras (HON)	Honduras	Honduras	Carlos Velasquez Hernandez	Athletics
16	Jamaica (JAM)	Jamaica	Jamaïque	Tevaughn Thomas	Athletics
17	Mexico (MEX)	México	Mexique	Nely Miranda	Swimming
18	Nicaragua (NCA)	Nicaragua	Nicaragua	Gabriel Cuadra Holmann	Athletics
19	Panama (PAN)	Panamá	Panama	Cesar Barria	Swimming
20	Peru (PER)	Perú	Perou	Pedro Pablo de Vinatea	Swimming
21	Puerto Rico (PUR)	Puerto Rico	Porto Rico	Carlos Ocasio	Wheelchair basketball
22	Suriname (SUR)	Surinam	Suriname	Sefanja Hankers	Swimming
23	Trinidad and Tobago (TTO)	Trinidad y Tobago	Trinité-et-Tobago	Carlos Grenne	Athletics
24	United States (USA)	Estados Unidos de América	États-Unis D'Amerique	Curtis Lovejoy	Swimming
25	Uruguay (URU)	Uruguay	Uruguay	Henry Burgos	Judo
26	Virgin Islands (ISV)	Islas Vírgenes de los Estados Unidos	Îles Vierges des États-Unis	Ivan Espinosa	Athletics
27	Venezuela (VEN)	Venezuela	Venezuela	Luis Paiva	Athletics
28	Canada (CAN)	Canadá	Canada	Marco Dispaltro	Boccia

==== Closing ceremony ====
The ceremony began with the introduction of Toronto mayor and APC president Campo. The ceremony featured Sean Jones rendition of Canada's national anthem, the Franco-Ontarian urban folk band Le Group Swing, performances from Grammy award-winner Wyclef Jean, as well as country music singer-songwriter Meghan Patrick. That night, president of the Americas Paralympic Committee, Jose Luis Campo described the Games "the best Parapan American Games ever". After Saäd Rafi, chief executive officer and Campo gave their speeches, Campo declared the games closed and the Americas Paralympic Committee flag was lowered. Toronto Mayor John Tory passed the APC flag over to Lima Mayor Luis Castañeda Lossio through Campo. A cultural performance from Peru was presented to symbolize Peru as the host of the next edition. The flame was extinguished when spoken word artist Mustafa the Poet performed on stage. The ceremony concluded with fireworks released to the sky.

=== Participating nations ===
28 nations competed at the Games.

Participating National Paralympic Committees
- Argentina (177)
- Aruba (1)
- Barbados (1)
- Bermuda (3)
- Brazil (276)
- Canada (209)
- Chile (60)
- Colombia (140)
- Costa Rica (27)
- Cuba (57)
- Dominican Republic (8)
- Ecuador (13)
- El Salvador (22)
- Guatemala (27)
- Haiti (1)
- Honduras (4)
- Jamaica (6)
- Mexico (181)
- Nicaragua (10)
- Panama (5)
- Peru (16)
- Puerto Rico (29)
- Suriname (2)
- Trinidad and Tobago (4)
- United States (246)
- Uruguay (12)
- Venezuela (113)
- Virgin Islands (1)

==== Number of athletes by National Paralympic Committee ====
IPC	Country	Athletes
BRA	Brazil	276
USA	United States	246
CAN	Canada	209
MEX	Mexico	181
ARG	Argentina	177
COL	Colombia	140
VEN	Venezuela	113
CHI	Chile	60
CUB	Cuba	57
PUR	Puerto Rico	29
CRC	Costa Rica	27
GUA	Guatemala	27
ESA	El Salvador	22
PER	Peru	16
ECU	Ecuador	13
URU	Uruguay	12
NCA	Nicaragua	10
DOM	Dominican Republic	8
JAM	Jamaica	6
PAN	Panama	5
HON	Honduras	4
TRI	Trinidad and Tobago	4
BER	Bermuda	3
SUR	Suriname	2
ARU	Aruba	1
BAR	Barbados	1
HAI	Haiti	1
ISV	Virgin Islands	1

=== Sports ===
Fifteen sports, the most ever for a Parapan American Games were contested. Wheelchair rugby made its debut at the Games, while Football 7-a-side made its return to the games after missing the 2011 Parapan American Games. All fifteen sports were used for Paralympic qualification in 2016.

- Archery (4)
- Athletics (114)
- Boccia (7)
- Cycling
  - Road (11)
  - Track (7)
- Football 5-a-side (1)
- Football 7-a-side (1)
- Goalball (2)
- Judo (9)
- Powerlifting (12)
- Sitting volleyball (2)
- Swimming (116)
- Table tennis (24)
- Wheelchair basketball (2)
- Wheelchair rugby (1)
- Wheelchair tennis (4)

== Calendar ==
OC	Opening ceremony	●	Event competitions	1	Event finals	CC	Closing ceremony

August	7 Fri	8 Sat	9 Sun	10 Mon	11 Tue	12 Wed	13 Thu	14 Fri	15 Sat	Events
Ceremonies	OC								CC	
Archery			●	4						4
Athletics				21	26	19	22	26		114
Boccia		3	●	●	4					7
Cycling		7		3	4		4			18
Football 5-a-side		●	●	●		●	●	1		1
Football 7-a-side		●	●	●		●	●		1	1
Goalball		●	●	●	●	●		1	1	2
Judo						3	2	4		9
Powerlifting		3	3	3	3					12
Sitting volleyball		●	●	●	●	●	●	2		2
Swimming		16	15	19	17	17	17	15		116
Table tennis		●	3	14	●	3	4			24
Wheelchair basketball		●	●	●	●	●	●	1	1	2
Wheelchair rugby		●	●	●	●	●	●	1		1
Wheelchair tennis		●	●	●	●	●	2	2		4
Total events		29	21	64	54	42	51	53	3	317
Cumulative total		29	50	114	168	210	261	314	317	—N/a
August	7 Fri	8 Sat	9 Sun	10 Mon	11 Tue	12 Wed	13 Thu	14 Fri	15 Sat	Events

== Medal table ==
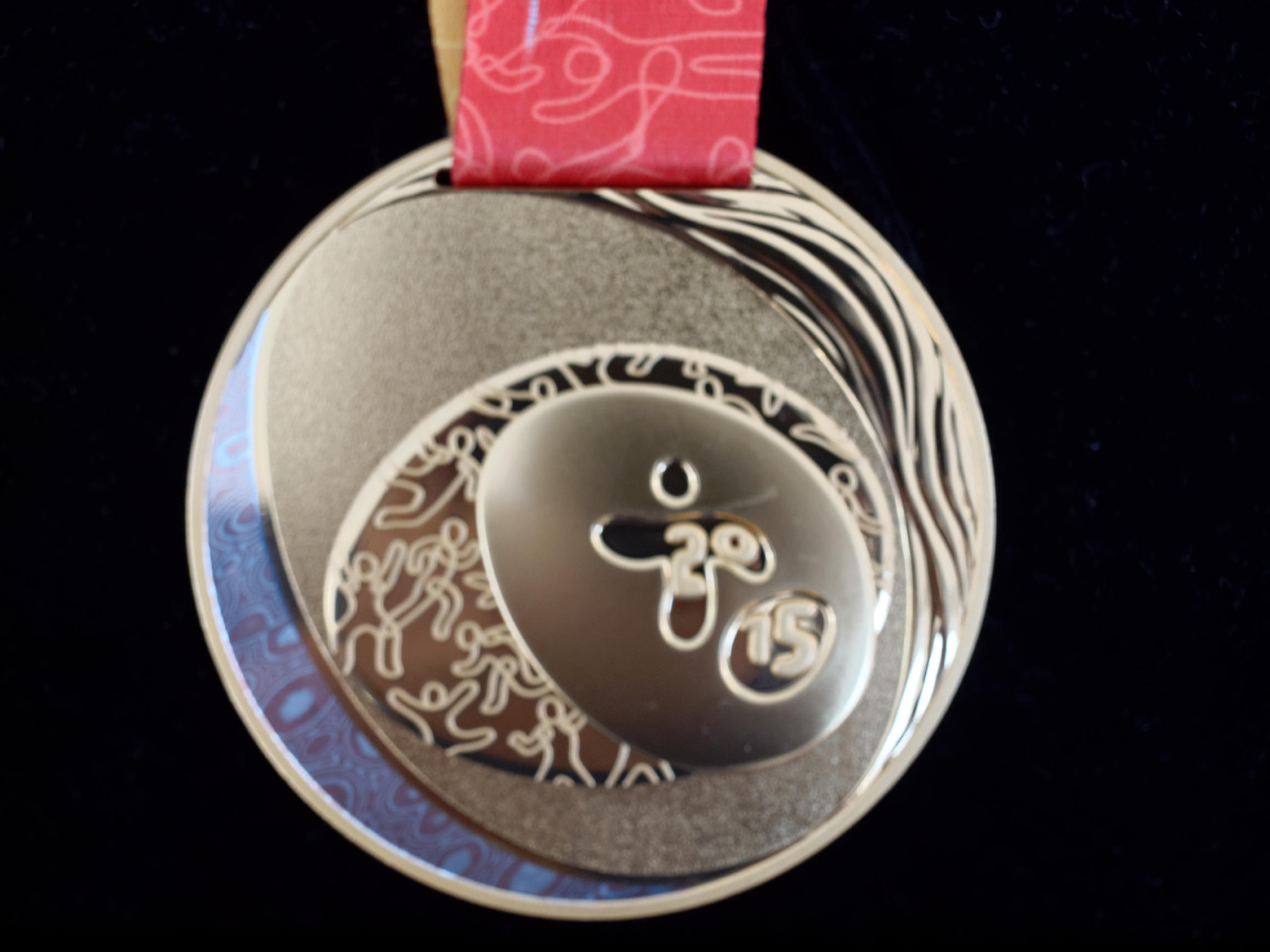
Gold medal

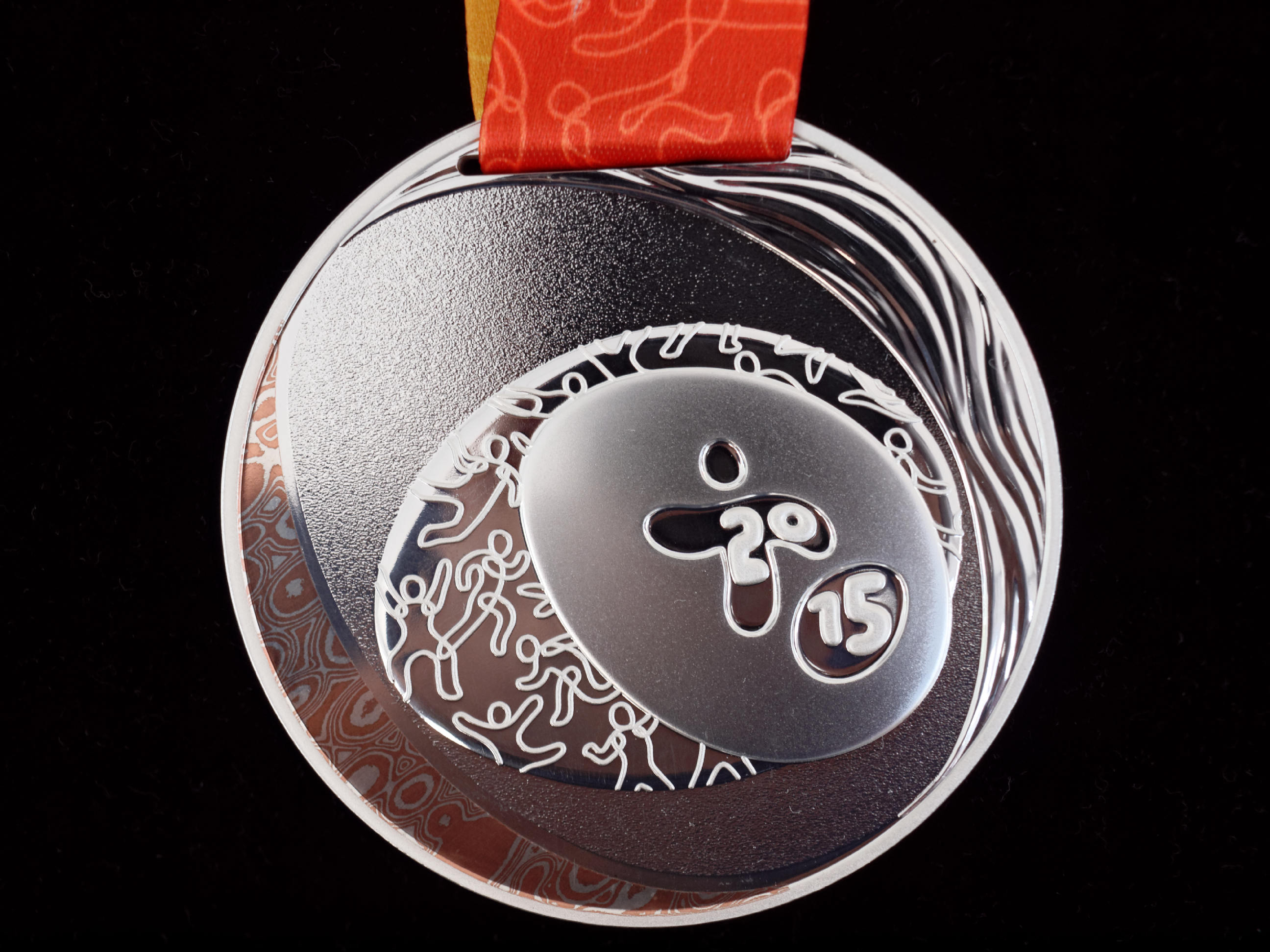
Silver medal

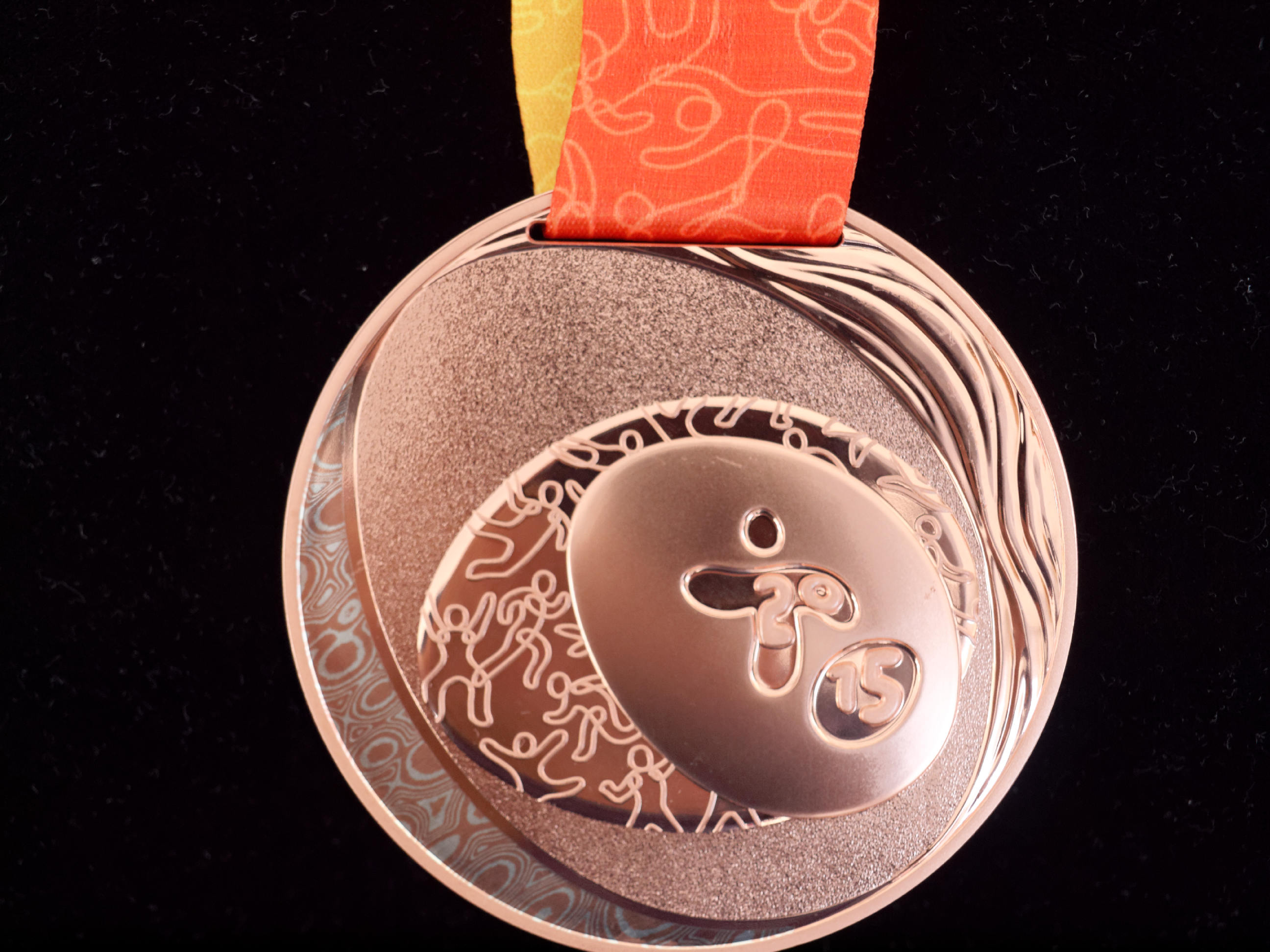
Bronze medal

The final medal count. * Host nation (Canada)

Rank	NPC	Gold	Silver	Bronze	Total
1	Brazil	109	74	74	257
2	Canada*	50	63	55	168
3	United States	40	51	44	135
4	Mexico	38	36	39	113
5	Colombia	24	36	30	90
6	Cuba	19	15	13	47
7	Argentina	18	25	24	67
8	Venezuela	8	14	25	47
9	Chile	4	2	6	12
10	Jamaica	2	2	1	5
11	Trinidad and Tobago	2	0	0	2
12	Ecuador	1	0	4	5
13	Bermuda	1	0	0	1
13	Uruguay	1	0	0	1
15	Nicaragua	0	0	4	4
16	Costa Rica	0	0	2	2
16	Puerto Rico	0	0	2	2
18	Dominican Republic	0	0	1	1
Totals (18 entries)		317	318	324	959

== See also ==
- 2015 Pan American Games
- 1976 Summer Paralympics

Preceded by Guadalajara	V Parapan American Games; Toronto (2015)	Succeeded by Lima
