= Americas Paralympic Committee =

International regional committee representing North and South America

- Type: Sports federation
- Headquarters: Miami, Florida, US
- Members: 34 National Paralympic Committees
- Official language: Spanish, English, Portuguese, French
- President: (Colombia) Julio César Ávila Sarria
- Website: http://www.americasparalympic.org/

Americas Paralympic Committee (APC; Spanish: Comité Paralímpico de Américas; Portuguese: Comitê Paralímpico das Américas; French: Comité Paralympique des Amériques) is an international International Paralympic Committee (IPC) regional committee which represents the current 34 National Paralympic Committees of the Americas. It is affiliated to/with the IPC and its affiliated bodies.

AmPC is the body that organizes and oversees the Parapan American Games held every four years in the year before the Summer Paralympics.

== Member countries ==
In the following table, the year in which the NPC was recognized by the International Paralympic Committee (IPC) is also given if it is different from the year in which the NPC was created.

Nation	Code	National Paralympic Committee	Created	Ref.
Antigua and Barbuda	ANT	Antigua and Barbuda Paralympic Committee	2012	
Argentina	ARG	Argentine Paralympic Committee	2004	
Aruba	ARU	Aruba Paralympic Committee	2015	
Barbados	BAR	Paralympic Association of Barbados		
Bermuda	BER	Bermuda Paralympic Association		
Bolivia	BOL	Bolivian Paralympic Committee	2025	
Brazil	BRA	Brazilian Paralympic Committee	1995	
Canada	CAN	Canadian Paralympic Committee	1981	
Chile	CHI	Paralympic Committee of Chile	1999	
Colombia	COL	Colombian Paralympic Committee	2001	
Costa Rica	CRC	Paralympic Committee of Costa Rica	2004	
Cuba	CUB	Cuban Paralympic Committee		
Dominican Republic	DOM	Paralympic Committee of the Dominican Republic	2008	
Ecuador	ECU	Ecuadorian Paralympic Sport Federation	2012	
El Salvador	ESA	Paralympic Committee of El Salvador		
Grenada	GRN	Grenada Paralympic Committee		
Guatemala	GUA	Guatemalan Paralympic Committee		
Guyana	GUY	Guyana Paralympic Committee		
Haiti	HAI	National Paralympic Committee of Haiti		
Honduras	HON	Honduran Paralympic Committee		
Jamaica	JAM	Jamaica Paralympic Association		
Mexico	MEX	Mexican Paralympic Committee		
Nicaragua	NCA	Nicaraguan Paralympic Committee		
Panama	PAN	Paralympic Committee of Panama		
Paraguay	PAR	Paraguayan Paralympic Committee	2018	
Peru	PER	National Paralympic Committee Peru		
Puerto Rico	PUR	Paralympic Committee of Puerto Rico		
Saint Vincent and the Grenadines	VIN	National Paralympic Committee St Vincent & the Grenadines		
Suriname	SUR	National Paralympic Committee of Suriname		
Trinidad and Tobago	TRI	Trinidad & Tobago Paralympic Committee	2009	
United States	USA	United States Olympic & Paralympic Committee	2001	
Uruguay	URU	Uruguayan Paralympic Committee	1996	
Venezuela	VEN	Venezuelan Paralympic Committee		
United States Virgin Islands	ISV	National Paralympic Committee US Virgin Islands		

== See also ==
- Pan American Sports Organization
- Parapan American Games
- Pan American Games
