= 1999 Parapan American Games =

1st Pan American Games

I Parapan American Games
- Host: Mexico City, Mexico
- Nations: 18
- Athletes: 1,000
- Events: 4 sports
- Opening: November 4
- Closing: November 14

The 1999 Parapan American Games, officially the I Pan American Games, was a major international multi-sport event for athletes with disabilities that took place in Mexico City, Mexico. Organized by the International Paralympics Committee, it marked the first official Parapan American Games. Over 1,000 athletes from 18 countries competed in the games. In some sports, the games served as a qualifier for the 2000 Summer Paralympics, the gold medal winners at Mexico 1999 directly securing a place at 2000 Summer Paralympics. These Parapan American Games were held in the same year but at a different location than the 1999 Pan American Games, which were held in Winnipeg, Canada during late July to early August.

== The Games ==
=== Participating nations ===
18 nations competed at the Games.

- Argentina
- Barbados
- Brazil
- Canada
- Chile
- Colombia
- Costa Rica
- Cuba
- El Salvador
- Honduras
- Jamaica
- Mexico
- Panama
- Peru
- Puerto Rico
- United States
- Uruguay
- Venezuela

=== Sports ===
- Athletics ()
- Swimming ()
- Table tennis ()
- Wheelchair basketball ()

=== Medal table ===
* Host nation (Mexico)

Rank	Nation	Gold	Silver	Bronze	Total
1	Mexico (MEX)*	121	105	81	307
2	Brazil (BRA)	107	69	36	212
3	Argentina (ARG)	62	48	47	157
4	United States (USA)	24	27	19	70
5	Cuba (CUB)	18	19	7	44
6	Uruguay (URU)	11	10	8	29
7	Venezuela (VEN)	9	10	11	30
8	Puerto Rico (PUR)	8	2	4	14
9	Canada (CAN)	4	3	3	10
10	Chile (CHI)	4	2	3	9
11	Peru (PER)	3	4	4	11
12	Jamaica (JAM)	3	2	1	6
13	Colombia (COL)	2	6	4	12
14	Costa Rica (CRC)	1	1	1	3
15	El Salvador (ESA)	1	1	0	2
Totals (15 entries)		378	309	229	916

== 1999 Pan American Games, Winnipeg, Canada ==
The 1999 Pan American Games were hosted in Winnipeg, rather than in Mexico City.
