= Parapan American Games =

International multi-sport event for athletes with disabilities

- Americas Paralympic Committee Logo
- Abbreviation: ParaPan-Am Games
- Purpose: Multi-sport event for athletes with physical disabilities from nations on the American continent
- Frequency: Every 4 years
- Inaugurated: 1999 Parapan American Games in Mexico City, Mexico
- Most recent: 2023 Parapan American Games in Santiago, Chile

Parapan American Games
- 1999; 2003; 2007; 2011; 2015; 2019; 2023

The Parapan American Games is an international multi-sport event for athletes with physical disabilities held every four years after every Pan American Games. The first Games were held in 1999 in Mexico City, Mexico. The 2003 Parapan American Games was the last Parapan American Games that was not held in the same city as the Pan American Games. The most recent Parapan American Games were held between 17 and 26 November 2023, in Santiago, Chile.
It is organized by the Americas Paralympic Committee.

== Games ==
Host cities of the Parapan American Games

Games	Year	Host country (as recognized by IPC)	Host city	Opened by	Dates	Nations	Competitors	Sports	Events	Top nation
1	1999	Mexico	Mexico City		4–11 November 1999	18	1,000	4	378	Mexico
2	2003	Argentina	Mar del Plata		3–10 December 2003	28	1,500	9	303	Mexico
3	2007	Brazil	Rio de Janeiro	Governor Sérgio Cabral Filho	12–19 August 2007	25	1,115	10	257	Brazil
4	2011	Mexico	Guadalajara	Secretary Bernardo de la Garza	12–20 November 2011	24	1,355	13	276	Brazil
5	2015	Canada	Toronto	Governor General David Johnston	7–15 August 2015	28	1,615	15	317	Brazil
6	2019	Peru	Lima	President Martín Vizcarra	23 August – 1 September 2019	30	1,890	17	370	Brazil
7	2023	Chile	Santiago	President Gabriel Boric	17–26 November 2023	31	1,934	17	380	Brazil
8	2027	Peru	Lima		20–29 August 2027			17		
9	2031	Paraguay	Asunción					17		

== Sports ==
Sport	Years
Archery	2011–2015, 2023
Athletics	Since 1999 (compulsory)
Badminton	2019–present
Boccia	2003, 2011–present (compulsory)
Cycling	2003, 2011–present
Equestrian	2003
Football 5-a-side	2007–present (compulsory)
Football 7-a-side	2007, 2015–present (compulsory)
Goalball	2011–present (compulsory)
Judo	2007–present (compulsory)

Sport	Years
Powerlifting	2007–present
Shooting	2019–present
Swimming	1999–present (compulsory)
Table tennis	1999, 2007–present (compulsory)
Taekwondo	2019–present
Sitting volleyball	2003–2019
Wheelchair basketball	1999–present (compulsory)
Wheelchair fencing	2003
Wheelchair tennis	2003–present
Wheelchair rugby	2015–present (compulsory)

== All-time medal table ==
- Last updated after the 2023 Parapan American Games.

Rank	Nation	Gold	Silver	Bronze	Total
1	Brazil (BRA)	741	522	447	1,710
2	Mexico (MEX)	431	422	352	1,205
3	United States (USA)	275	297	257	829
4	Argentina (ARG)	206	236	268	710
5	Canada (CAN)	155	168	165	488
6	Colombia (COL)	148	171	168	487
7	Cuba (CUB)	119	89	74	282
8	Venezuela (VEN)	76	90	128	294
9	Chile (CHI)	36	42	45	123
10	Peru (PER)	19	19	33	71
11	Uruguay (URU)	17	15	12	44
12	Ecuador (ECU)	15	14	17	46
13	Costa Rica (CRC)	9	11	11	31
14	Puerto Rico (PUR)	9	6	9	24
15	Jamaica (JAM)	7	12	6	25
16	Trinidad and Tobago (TTO)	5	1	3	9
17	Bermuda (BER)	4	2	0	6
18	El Salvador (ESA)	3	2	1	6
19	Guatemala (GUA)	1	0	1	2
20	Dominican Republic (DOM)	0	7	9	16
21	Panama (PAN)	0	3	1	4
22	Bolivia (BOL)	0	1	1	2
23	Nicaragua (NIC)	0	0	4	4
24	Aruba (ARU)	0	0	1	1
24	Paraguay (PAR)	0	0	1	1
Totals (25 entries)		2,276	2,130	2,014	6,420

== Youth Games ==
The Youth Parapan American Games is an international multi-sport event for athletes aged 12 to 21 with physical disabilities. The games were created after the 2003 Pan American Games in order to reduce the large average age gap between countries in the Americas. The games are held every four years, staggering with the Pan American and Parapan American games, with first of its kind being held in 2005 in Barquisimeto, Venezuela.

=== List of Youth Parapan American Games ===
Games	Year	Host city	Host nation	Opened by	Start Date	End Date	Nations	Competitors	Sports	Events	Top Placed Team	Ref.
1	2005	Barquisimeto	Venezuela		22 October	30 October	10		8		Venezuela (VEN)	
2	2009	Bogotá	Colombia		17 October	22 October	14	700	9		Brazil (BRA)	
3	2013	Buenos Aires	Argentina	Alicia Kirchner	13 October	20 October	16	600	10		Brazil (BRA)	
4	2017	São Paulo	Brazil		20 March	25 March	19	808	12		Brazil (BRA)	
5	2023	Bogotá	Colombia		2 June	12 June			12		Colombia (COL)	
6	2025	Santiago	Chile		31 October	9 November	27		14		Brazil (BRA)	

== See also ==
- Pan American Games
- Paralympic Games
  - African Para Games
  - Asian Para Games
  - European Para Championships
