= United States at the 2015 Parapan American Games =

- IPC code: USA

in Toronto, Canada August 7, 2015 – August 15, 2015
- Competitors: 246
- Medals Ranked 3rd: Gold 40 Silver 51 Bronze 44 Total 135

Parapan American Games appearances (overview)
- 1999; 2003; 2007; 2011; 2015; 2019; 2023

The United States competed at the 2015 Parapan American Games held in Toronto, Canada.

== Medalists ==
Medal	Name	Sport	Event	Date
Gold	Natalie Wells	Archery	Women's recurve	August 10
Gold	Andre Shelby	Archery	Men's compound	August 10
Gold	David Brown	Athletics	Men's 100m T11	August 11
Gold	Shaquille Vance	Athletics	Men's 100m T42	
Gold	Jarryd Wallace	Athletics	Men's 100m T44	
Gold	Raymond Martin	Athletics	Men's 100m T52	
Gold	David Brown	Athletics	Men's 200m T11	
Gold	Gianfranco Iannotta	Athletics	Men's 200m T52	
Gold	Raymond Martin	Athletics	Men's 400m T52	
Gold	Michael Brannigan	Athletics	Men's 1500m T20	
Gold	Raymond Martin	Athletics	Men's 1500m T52	
Gold	Daniel Romanchuk	Athletics	Men's 5000m T54	
Gold	Dion Townsend-Roberts	Athletics	Men's high jump T42/44/47	
Gold	Elexis Gillette	Athletics	Men's long jump T11/12	
Gold	Regas Woods	Athletics	Men's long jump T42/44	
Gold	Dion Townsend-Roberts	Athletics	Men's long jump T47	
Gold	Chelsea McClammer	Athletics	Women's 400m T53	
Gold	Hannah McFadden	Athletics	Women's 400m T54	
Gold	Chelsea McClammer	Athletics	Women's 800m T53	
Gold	Rachael Morrison	Athletics	Women's discus throw F51/52	
Gold	Angela Madsen	Athletics	Women's javelin throw F55/56	
Gold	Joseph Berenyi	Cycling	Men's road race C1-3	
Gold	Samantha Heinrich	Cycling	Women's road race C1-5	
Gold	William Groulx	Cycling	Mixed road race H1-2M/H1-5W	
Gold	Brian Sheridan	Cycling	Mixed time trial H1-5	
Gold	Jill Walsh	Cycling	Mixed time trial T1-2	
Gold	Joseph Berenyi	Cycling	Men's individual pursuit C1-3	
Gold	Joseph Berenyi	Cycling	Men's 1km time trial C1-5	
Gold	United States national women's sitting volleyball team	Sitting volleyball	Women's tournament	
Gold	Mallory Weggemann	Swimming	Women's 100m freestyle S8	
Gold	Haley Beranbaum	Swimming	Women's 50m backstroke S5	
Gold	Ahalya Lettenberger	Swimming	Women's 100m backstroke S8	
Gold	Leslie Cichocki	Swimming	Women's 100m backstroke S14	
Gold	Reilly Boyt	Swimming	Women's 100m breaststroke SB6	
Gold	Reilly Boyt	Swimming	Women's 200m individual medley SM6	
Gold	Mallory Weggemann	Swimming	Women's 200m individual medley SM8	
Gold	Tahl Leibovitz	Table tennis	Men's singles C9	
Gold	Benjamin Hadden	Table tennis	Men's singles C11	
Gold	United States national men's wheelchair basketball team	Wheelchair basketball	Men's tournament	
Gold	United States national women's wheelchair basketball team	Wheelchair basketball	Women's tournament	
Silver	Eric Bennett	Archery	Men's recurve	August 10
Silver	Matt Stutzman	Archery	Men's compound	August 10
Silver	Josiah Jamison	Athletics	Men's 100m T12	August 11
Silver	Ayden Jent	Athletics	Men's 100m T35	
Silver	Regas Woods	Athletics	Men's 100m T42	
Silver	Gianfranco Iannotta	Athletics	Men's 100m T52	
Silver	David Prince	Athletics	Men's 200m T44	
Silver	Erik Hightower	Athletics	Men's 400m T54	
Silver	Austin Handley	Athletics	Men's 1500m T38	
Silver	Steven Toyoji	Athletics	Men's 1500m T52	
Silver	Charles Davis	Athletics	Men's 5000m T12	
Silver	Tyson Gunter	Athletics	Men's long jump T13	
Silver	Tobi Fawehinmi	Athletics	Men's long jump T47	
Silver	Michael Wishnia	Athletics	Men's shot put F57	
Silver	Jeremy Campbell	Athletics	Men's discus throw F44	
Silver	Kerri Morgan	Athletics	Women's 100m T52	
Silver	Shirley Reilly	Athletics	Women's 400m T53	
Silver	Cheri Madsen	Athletics	Women's 400m T54	
Silver	Shirley Reilly	Athletics	Women's 800m T53	
Silver	Hannah McFadden	Athletics	Women's 800m T54	
Silver	Angela Madsen	Athletics	Women's shot put F56/57	
Silver	Cassie Mitchell	Athletics	Women's discus throw F51/52	
Silver	Rachael Morrison	Athletics	Women's club throw F31/32/51	
Silver	William Lachenauer	Cycling	Men's road race H3-5	
Silver	Joseph Berenyi	Cycling	Mixed time trial C1-5	
Silver	Brian Sheridan	Cycling	Mixed road race H1-2M/H1-5W	
Silver	William Groulx	Cycling	Mixed time trial H1-5	
Silver	Ryan Boyle	Cycling	Mixed road race T1-2	
Silver	Samantha Heinrich	Cycling	Women's individual pursuit C1-5	
Silver	Jennifer Schuble	Cycling	Women's 500m time trial C1-5	
Silver	Joseph Hamilton; Andrew Jenks; John Kusku; Donte Mickens; Matt Simpson; Daryl Walker	Goalball	Men's tournament	
Silver	Jennifer Armbruster; Lisa Czechowski; Amanda Dennis; Marybai Huking; Eliana Mason; Asya Miller	Goalball	Women's tournament	
Silver	Myles Porter	Judo	Men's 100 kg	
Silver	United States national men's sitting volleyball team	Sitting volleyball	Men's tournament	
Silver	Tom Miazga	Swimming	Men's 100m backstroke S8	
Silver	Mallory Weggemann	Swimming	Women's 50m freestyle S8	
Silver	Mallory Weggemann	Swimming	Women's 400m freestyle S8	
Silver	Anna Johannes	Swimming	Women's 100m backstroke S9	
Silver	Haley Beranbaum	Swimming	Women's 100m breaststroke SB5	
Silver	Sophia Elizabeth Herzog	Swimming	Women's 100m breaststroke SB6	
Silver	Anna Johannes	Swimming	Women's 100m breaststroke SB8	
Silver	Sophia Elizabeth Herzog	Swimming	Women's 200m individual medley SM6	
Silver	Curtis Lovejoy; Sophia Elizabeth Herzog; Zachary Shattuck; Reilly Boyt	Swimming	Mixed 4x50m freestyle relay 20pts	
Silver	Ari Arratia	Table tennis	Men's singles C6	
Silver	Lim Ming Chui	Table tennis	Men's singles C8	
Silver	Lim Ming Chui; Tahl Leibovitz	Table tennis	Men's team C9-10	
Silver	United States national wheelchair rugby team	Wheelchair rugby	Mixed tournament	
Silver	Jon Rydberg	Wheelchair tennis	Men's singles	
Silver	Kaitlyn Verfuerth	Wheelchair tennis	Women's singles	
Bronze	Timothy Palumbo	Archery	Men's recurve	August 10
Bronze	Kinga Kiss-Johnson	Archery	Women's recurve	August 10
Bronze	Ben Thompson	Archery	Men's compound	August 10
Bronze	Martha Chavez	Archery	Women's compound	August 10
Bronze	Desmond Jackson	Athletics	Men's 100m T42	
Bronze	Paul Nitz	Athletics	Men's 100m T52	
Bronze	Michael Murray	Athletics	Men's 400m T20	
Bronze	Isaiah Rigo	Athletics	Men's 1500m T52	
Bronze	Jeff Skiba	Athletics	Men's high jump T42/44/47	
Bronze	Ahkeel Whitehead	Athletics	Men's long jump T37	
Bronze	Rudy Garcia-Tolson	Athletics	Men's long jump T42/44	
Bronze	David Blair	Athletics	Men's discus throw F44	
Bronze	Jeff Skiba	Athletics	Men's javelin throw F44	
Bronze	Johnnie Williams	Athletics	Men's javelin throw F56	
Bronze	Cassie Mitchell	Athletics	Women's 100m T52	
Bronze	Cheri Madsen	Athletics	Women's 800m T54	
Bronze	Cassie Mitchell	Athletics	Women's club throw F31/32/51	
Bronze	Allison Jones	Cycling	Mixed time trial C1-5	
Bronze	Ryan Boyle	Cycling	Mixed time trial T1-2	
Bronze	Justin Widhalm	Cycling	Men's 1km time trial C1-5	
Bronze	Shawn Morelli	Cycling	Women's individual pursuit C1-5	
Bronze	Allison Jones	Cycling	Women's 500m time trial C1-5	
Bronze	Ron Hawthrone	Judo	Men's 60 kg	
Bronze	Dartanyon Crockett	Judo	Men's 90 kg	
Bronze	Robert Anderson	Judo	Men's +100 kg	
Bronze	Zach Shattuck	Swimming	Men's 100m backstroke S6	
Bronze	Roderick Sewell	Swimming	Men's 100m breaststroke SB6	
Bronze	Lucas McCrory	Swimming	Men's 100m breaststroke SB7	
Bronze	Lucas McCrory	Swimming	Men's 200m individual medley SM7	
Bronze	Haley Beranbaum	Swimming	Women's 50m freestyle S5	
Bronze	Sophia Elizabeth Herzog	Swimming	Women's 50m freestyle S6	
Bronze	Haley Beranbaum	Swimming	Women's 100m freestyle S5	
Bronze	Leslie Cichocki	Swimming	Women's 200m freestyle S14	
Bronze	Anna Johannes	Swimming	Women's 400m freestyle S9	
Bronze	Serafina King	Swimming	Women's 400m freestyle S10	
Bronze	McClain Hermes	Swimming	Women's 400m freestyle S13	
Bronze	Reilly Boyt	Swimming	Women's 100m backstroke S6	
Bronze	Jessica Hernandez	Swimming	Women's 100m backstroke S7	
Bronze	Mallory Weggemann	Swimming	Women's 100m backstroke S8	
Bronze	Leslie Cichocki	Swimming	Women's 200m individual medley SM14	
Bronze	Pamela Fontaine	Table tennis	Women's singles C3	
Bronze	Sherri Umscheid	Table tennis	Women's singles C6	
Bronze	Jennifer Johnson; Cynthia Ranii	Table tennis	Women's team C4-5	
Bronze	Emmy Kaiser	Wheelchair tennis	Women's singles	
Bronze	Emmy Kaiser; Kaitlyn Verfuerth	Wheelchair tennis	Women's doubles	

== Competitors ==
Sport	Men	Women	Total
Archery	5	5	10
Total	5	5	10

== Archery ==
Men

Athlete	Event	Ranking Round		Round of 16	Quarterfinals	Semifinals	Final / BM	
Athlete	Event	Score	Seed	Opposition Score	Opposition Score	Opposition Score	Opposition Score	Rank
Andre Shelby	Individual compound open	684	2	Bye	Cesar Oliveira (BRA); W 141 T9-141 T9	Evans (CAN); W 143-140	Stutzman (USA); W 144-140	1st place, gold medalist(s)
Matt Stutzman	Individual compound open	687	1	Bye	Hudson (CAN); W 144-132	Thompson (USA); W 144-143	Shelby (USA); L 140-144	2nd place, silver medalist(s)
Ben Thompson	Individual compound open	674	4	Bye	Denys (CAN); W 142-135	Stutzman (USA); L 143-144	Evans (CAN); W 141-138	3rd place, bronze medalist(s)
Eric Bennett	Individual recurve open	635 PR	1	—N/a	Bye	Sousa (BRA); W 3-1	Rezende (BRA); L 2-3	2nd place, silver medalist(s)
Timothy Palumbo	Individual recurve open	626	2	—N/a	Bye	Rezende (BRA); L 1-3	Sousa (BRA); W 3-0	3rd place, bronze medalist(s)

Women

Athlete	Event	Ranking Round		Quarterfinals	Semifinals	Final / BM	
Athlete	Event	Score	Seed	Opposition Score	Opposition Score	Opposition Score	Rank
Martha Chavez	Individual compound open	623	3	Bye	Van Nest (CAN); L 121-140	Apparecida Borges (BRA); W 133-125	3rd place, bronze medalist(s)
Samantha Tucker	Individual compound open	506	5	Apparecida Borges (BRA); L 109-121	Did not advance.		
Lee Ford	Individual recurve open	DNS		Did not advance.			
Kinga Kiss-Johnson	Individual recurve open	521	3	Bye	Wells (USA); L 1-3	O'Neill Layolle (BRA); W 3-1	3rd place, bronze medalist(s)
Natalie Wells	Individual recurve open	528	2	Bye	Kiss-Johnson (USA); W 3-1	Silva Carvalho (BRA); W 3-1	1st place, gold medalist(s)

== Cycling ==
The United States finished in 1st place in the cycling medal table.

== Football 7-a-side ==
The United States finished in 5th place out of 5 teams.

== Goalball ==
The United States won the silver medal in both the men's tournament and women's tournament.

== Sitting volleyball ==
The United States won the gold medal in the women's tournament and the silver medal in the men's tournament.

== Wheelchair basketball ==
Both the men's tournament and women's tournament were won by the United States.

== Wheelchair rugby ==
The United States won the silver medal in the wheelchair rugby tournament.

== Wheelchair tennis ==
In total, two silver medals and two bronze medals were won in wheelchair tennis.

== See also ==
- United States at the 2015 Pan American Games
