= Archery at the 2015 Parapan American Games – Compound Men's =

Archery – Compound Men's at the 2015 Parapan American Games
- Dates: August 9–10
- Competitors: 12 from 6 nations

Medalists
1st place, gold medalist(s)		Andre Shelby	United States
2nd place, silver medalist(s)		Matt Stutzman	United States
3rd place, bronze medalist(s)		Ben Thompson	United States

The compound men's competition of the archery events at the 2015 Parapan American Games was held between August 9 and 10 at the Varsity Stadium. The defending Parapan American Games champion was Kevin Evans of Canada.

== Schedule ==
All times are Central Standard Time (UTC-6).

Date	Time	Round
9 August	10:00	Ranking round
9 August	14:00	Round of 16
9 August	14:45	Quarterfinals
9 August	15:30	Semifinal
10 August	10:48	Bronze medal match
10 August	11:12	Final

== Results ==
=== Ranking round ===
Rank	Archer	Nation	Score	Notes
1	Matt Stutzman	United States	687	
2	Andre Shelby	United States	684	
3	Andrey Castro	Brazil	680	
4	Ben Thompson	United States	674	
5	Alec Denys	Canada	666	
6	Kevin Evans	Canada	664	
7	Julio Cesar Oliveira	Brazil	654	
8	Norberto Trinidad	Puerto Rico	653	
9	Bob Hudson	Canada	630	
10	Ricardo Rosario	Puerto Rico	628	
11	Federico Luis Paolorossi	Argentina	623	
12	Luis Jose Martinez	Venezuela	574	

=== Competition rounds ===
Round of 16
1	Matt Stutzman (USA)
-BYE-
9	Bob Hudson (CAN)
8	Norberto Trinidad (PUR)	DNS
5	Alec Deys (CAN)	137
12	Luis Jose Martinez (VEN)	107
-BYE-
4	Ben Thompson (USA)
3	Andrey Castro (BRA)
-BYE-
11	Federico Luis Paolorossi (ARG)	136
6	Kevin Evans (CAN)	137
7	Julio Cesar Oliveira (BRA)	135
10	Ricardo Rosario (PUR)	133
-BYE
2	Andre Shelby (USA)

Quarterfinals
1	Matt Stutzman (USA)	144
9	Bob Hudson (CAN)	132
5	Alec Denys (CAN)	135
4	Ben Thompson (USA)	142
3	Andrey Castro (BRA)	136
6	Kevin Evans (CAN)	140
7	Julio Cesar Oliveira (BRA)	141 T9
2	Andre Shelby (USA)	141 T9*

Semifinals
1	Matt Stutzman (USA)	144
4	Ben Thompson (USA)	143
6	Kevin Evans (CAN)	140
2	Andre Shelby (USA)	143

Final
1	Matt Stutzman (USA)	140
2	Andre Shelby (USA)	144
Bronze medal match
4	Ben Thompson (USA)	141
6	Kevin Evans (CAN)	138
