= Athletics at the 2015 Parapan American Games – Men's 200 metres T47 =

Athletics – Men's 200 metres T47 at the 2015 Parapan American Games
- Venue: CIBC Athletics Stadium
- Dates: August 13–14
- Competitors: 13 from 8 nations

Medalists
1st place, gold medalist(s)		Petrucio Ferreira dos Santos	Brazil
2nd place, silver medalist(s)		Yohansson do Nascimento Ferreira	Brazil
3rd place, bronze medalist(s)		Ernesto Blanco	Cuba

The men's T47 (including T45 and T46 athletes) 200 metres competition of the athletics events at the 2015 Parapan American Games was held between August 13 and 14 at the CIBC Athletics Stadium. The defending T46 Parapan American Games champion was Yohansson Nascimento of Brazil.

== Records ==
Prior to this competition, the existing records were as follows:

=== T45 ===
World record	Yohansson do Nascimento Ferreira (BRA)	21.91	Lyon, France	22 July 2013
Americas record	Yohansson do Nascimento Ferreira (BRA)	21.91	Lyon, France	22 July 2013
Parapan record	Yohansson do Nascimento Ferreira (BRA)	22.34	Guadalajara, Mexico	17 November 2011

=== T47 ===
World record	Petrucio Ferreira dos Santos (BRA)	21.49	São Paulo, Brazil	24 April 2015
Americas record	Petrucio Ferreira dos Santos (BRA)	21.49	São Paulo, Brazil	24 April 2015
Parapan record	Ettiam Calderon (CUB)	22.54	Guadalajara, Mexico	17 November 2011

=== Broken records ===
==== T46 ====
Parapan Am record	Raciel Gonzalez (CUB)	22.36	Toronto, Canada	13 August 2015

==== T47 ====
Parapan Am record	Petrucio Ferreira dos Santos (BRA)	21.51	Toronto, Canada	14 August 2015

== Schedule ==
All times are Central Standard Time (UTC-6).

Date	Time	Round
13 August	17:06	Semifinal 1
13 August	17:12	Semifinal 2
14 August	16:58	Final

== Results ==
All athletes are classified as T47 unless indicated.
All times are shown in seconds.

KEY:	q	Fastest non-qualifiers	Q	Qualified	PR	Parapan American Games record	AR	Area record	NR	National record	PB	Personal best	SB	Seasonal best	DSQ	Disqualified	FS	False start

=== Semifinals ===
The fastest three from each heat and next two overall fastest qualified for the final.

==== Semifinal 1 ====
Wind: -2.4 m/s

Rank	Name	Nation	Time	Notes
1	Raciel Gonzalez	Cuba	22.36	Q, PR, T46
2	Yohansson do Nascimento Ferreira	Brazil	22.66	Q, T46
3	Ernesto Blanco	Cuba	22.67	Q, T46
4	Shane Blanco	Jamaica	22.81	q, PB
5	Jack Hudson	United States	23.89	
6	Ever Caceres	Argentina	24.94	

==== Semifinal 2 ====
Wind: -1.6 m/s

Rank	Name	Nation	Time	Notes
1	Petrucio Ferreira dos Santos	Brazil	22.06	Q, PR
2	Ettiam Calderon	Cuba	22.97	Q
3	Samuel Colmenares	Venezuela	23.26	Q
4	David Bascoe	Jamaica	23.76	q, T46
5	Braian Villarreal	Argentina	24.13	T46
6	Wemerson de la Rosa	Dominican Republic	24.48	T46
	Raul Perez	Guatemala	did not start	T45

=== Final ===
Wind: -1.2 m/s

Rank	Name	Nation	Time	Notes
1st place, gold medalist(s)	Petrucio Ferreira dos Santos	Brazil	21.51	PR
2nd place, silver medalist(s)	Yohansson do Nascimento Ferreira	Brazil	22.11	SB, T46
3rd place, bronze medalist(s)	Ernesto Blanco	Cuba	22.28	T46
4	Raciel Gonzalez	Cuba	22.28	T46
5	Ettiam Calderon	Cuba	22.84	
6	Shane Hudson	Jamaica	22.90	
7	Samuel Colmenares	Venezuela	23.10	SB
	David Bascoe	Jamaica	did not start	T46
