= Archery at the 2015 Parapan American Games =

- Venue: Varsity Stadium
- Dates: 9–10 August 2015
- Competitors: 23 from 6 nations

The archery event at the 2015 Parapan American Games was played from 9–10 August 2015 at Varsity Stadium in Toronto.

== Medal summary ==
=== Medal table ===
Rank	Nation	Gold	Silver	Bronze	Total
1	United States	2	2	4	8
2	Brazil	2	1	0	3
3	Canada	0	1	0	1
Totals (3 entries)		4	4	4	12

=== Medal events ===
Event	Gold	Silver	Bronze
Recurve Men's	Luciano Rezende; Brazil	Eric Bennett; United States	Timothy Palumbo; United States
Recurve Women's	Natalie Wells; United States	Thais Silva Carvalho; Brazil	Kinga Kiss-Johnson; United States
Compound Men's	Andre Shelby; United States	Matt Stutzman; United States	Ben Thompson; United States
Compound Women's	Jane Karla Gogel; Brazil	Karen Van Nest; Canada	Martha Chavez; United States
