= Athletics at the 2015 Parapan American Games – Men's 200 metres T52 =

Athletics – Men's 200 metres T52 at the 2015 Parapan American Games
- Venue: CIBC Athletics Stadium
- Dates: August 13
- Competitors: 6 from 3 nations

Medalists
1st place, gold medalist(s)		Gianfranco Iannotta	United States
2nd place, silver medalist(s)		Salvador Hernandez	Mexico
3rd place, bronze medalist(s)		Cristian Torres	Colombia

The men's T52 200 metres competition of the athletics events at the 2015 Parapan American Games was held on August 13 at the CIBC Athletics Stadium. The defending Parapan American Games champion was Raymond Martin of the United States.

== Records ==
Prior to this competition, the existing records were as follows:

World record	Raymond Martin (USA)	30.02	Mesa, United States of America	10 May 2014
Americas record	Raymond Martin (USA)	30.02	Mesa, United States of America	10 May 2014
Parapan record	Raymond Martin (USA)	32.02	Guadalajara, Mexico	18 November 2011

== Schedule ==
All times are Central Standard Time (UTC-6).

Date	Time	Round
13 August	17:59	Final

== Results ==
All times are shown in seconds.

KEY:	q	Fastest non-qualifiers	Q	Qualified	PR	Parapan American Games record	AR	Area record	NR	National record	PB	Personal best	SB	Seasonal best	DSQ	Disqualified	FS	False start

=== Final ===
Wind: -1.2 m/s

Rank	Name	Nation	Time	Notes
1st place, gold medalist(s)	Gianfranco Iannotta	United States	33.40	
2nd place, silver medalist(s)	Salvador Hernandez	Mexico	33.73	
3rd place, bronze medalist(s)	Cristian Torres	Colombia	33.82	
4	Paul Nitz	United States	34.11	
5	Leonardo Perez	Mexico	34.12	
6	Isaiah Rigo	United States	34.65	
