= Athletics at the 2015 Parapan American Games – Men's 100 metres T52 =

Athletics – Men's 100 metres T52 at the 2015 Parapan American Games
- Venue: CIBC Athletics Stadium
- Dates: August 11
- Competitors: 6 from 3 nations

Medalists
1st place, gold medalist(s)		Raymond Martin	United States
2nd place, silver medalist(s)		Gianfranco Iannotta	United States
3rd place, bronze medalist(s)		Paul Nitz	United States

The men's T52 100 metres competition of the athletics events at the 2015 Parapan American Games was held on August 11 at the CIBC Athletics Stadium. The defending Parapan American Games champion was Salvador Hernandez Mondragon of Mexico.

== Records ==
Prior to this competition, the existing records were as follows:

=== T51 ===
World record	Toni Piispanen (FIN)	20.47	Arbon, Switzerland	4 June 2015

=== T52 ===
World record	Raymond Martin (USA)	16.46	Arbon, Switzerland	4 June 2015

== Schedule ==
All times are Central Standard Time (UTC-6).

Date	Time	Round
11 August	16:43	Final

== Results ==
All times are shown in seconds.

KEY:	q	Fastest non-qualifiers	Q	Qualified	PR	Parapan American Games record	AR	Area record	NR	National record	PB	Personal best	SB	Seasonal best	DSQ	Disqualified	FS	False start

=== Final ===
All athletes are classified as T52 unless indicated.
Wind +3.7 m/s

Rank	Name	Nation	Time	Notes
1st place, gold medalist(s)	Raymond Martin	United States	17.01	
2nd place, silver medalist(s)	Gianfranco Iannotta	United States	17.39	
3rd place, bronze medalist(s)	Paul Nitz	United States	17.46	
4	Salvador Hernandez	Mexico	17.73	
5	Cristian Torres	Colombia	17.91	
6	Edgar Navarro	Mexico	22.30	T51
