= Athletics at the 2015 Parapan American Games – Men's 100 metres T42 =

Athletics – Men's 100 metres T42 at the 2015 Parapan American Games
- Venue: CIBC Athletics Stadium
- Dates: August 11
- Competitors: 4 from 2 nations

Medalists
1st place, gold medalist(s)		Shaquille Vance	United States
2nd place, silver medalist(s)		Regas Woods	United States
3rd place, bronze medalist(s)		Desmond Jackson	United States

The men's T42 100 metres competition of the athletics events at the 2015 Parapan American Games was held on August 11 at the CIBC Athletics Stadium. The defending Parapan American Games champion was Shaquille Vance of the United States of America.

== Records ==
Prior to this competition, the existing records were as follows:

World record	Heinrich Popow (GER)	12.11	Leverkusen, Germany	July 12, 2013
Americas Record	Earle Connor (CAN)	12.14	Leverkusen, Germany	June 1, 2002

=== Broken Records ===
Parapan Am Record	Shaquille Vance (USA)	12.69	Toronto, Canada	11 August 2015

== Schedule ==
All times are Central Standard Time (UTC-6).

Date	Time	Round
11 August	19:02	Final

== Results ==
All times are shown in seconds.

KEY:	q	Fastest non-qualifiers	Q	Qualified	PR	Parapan American Games record	AR	Area record	NR	National record	PB	Personal best	SB	Seasonal best	DSQ	Disqualified	FS	False start

=== Final ===
Wind +1.5 m/s

Rank	Name	Nation	Time	Notes
1st place, gold medalist(s)	Shaquille Vance	United States	12.69	PR
2nd place, silver medalist(s)	Regas Woods	United States	13:26	
3rd place, bronze medalist(s)	Desmond Jackson	United States	13.29	PB
4	Carlos Felipa	Peru	16.33	
