= Trinidad and Tobago at the 2023 Parapan American Games =

- Flag of Trinidad and Tobago
- IPC code: TTO
- NPC: Trinidad and Tobago Paralympic Committee
- Website: www.paralympic.org/trinidad-and-tobago

in Santiago, Chile 17 November 2023 – 26 November 2023
- Competitors: 1 in 1 sport
- Flag bearer (opening): Akeem Stewart
- Flag bearer (closing): Akeem Stewart
- Medals Ranked 15th: Gold 1 Silver 0 Bronze 0 Total 1

Parapan American Games appearances
- 1999; 2003; 2007; 2011; 2015; 2019; 2023

Trinidad and Tobago is scheduled to compete in the 2023 Parapan American Games in Santiago, Chile from 17 November to 26 November 2023. This is Trinidad and Tobago's seventh appearance at the Parapan American Games, having competed at every edition of the games since the inaugural edition in 1999.

Paralympic athlete Akeem Stewart was the country's flagbearer during the opening ceremony and the closing ceremony.

== Medalists ==
The following competitors won medals at the games. In the discipline sections below, the medalists' names are bolded.

Medal	Name	Sport	Event	Date
Gold	Akeem Stewart	Athletics	Men's discus throw F64	November 24

== Competitors ==
The following is the list of number of competitors (per gender) participating at the games per sport/discipline.

Sport	Men	Women	Total
Athletics	1	0	1
Total	1	0	1

== Athletics ==
Men

Field events

Athlete	Event	Final	
Athlete	Event	Distance	Position
**Akeem Stewart**	Discus throw F64	58.02	1st place, gold medalist(s)

== See also ==
- Trinidad and Tobago at the 2023 Pan American Games
- Trinidad and Tobago at the 2024 Summer Paralympics
