= Athletics at the 2015 Parapan American Games – Men's 400 metres T20 =

Athletics – Men's 400 metres T20 at the 2015 Parapan American Games
- Venue: CIBC Athletics Stadium
- Dates: August 11
- Competitors: 8 from 5 nations

Medalists
| 1st place, gold medalist(s) | | Luis Arturo Paiva | Venezuela |
| 2nd place, silver medalist(s) | | Edixon Pirela | Venezuela |
| 3rd place, bronze medalist(s) | | Michael Murray | United States |

The men's T20 400 metres competition of the athletics events at the 2015 Parapan American Games was held on August 11 at the CIBC Athletics Stadium.

== Records ==
Prior to this competition, the existing records were as follows:

| World record | Allan Stuart (GBR) | 46.72 | Glasgow, Great Britain | June 29, 2003 |

== Schedule ==
All times are Central Standard Time (UTC-6).

| Date | Time | Round |
|---|---|---|
| 11 August | 19:13 | Final |

== Results ==
All times are shown in seconds.

| KEY: | q | Fastest non-qualifiers | Q | Qualified | PR | Parapan American Games record | NR | National record | PB | Personal best | SB | Seasonal best | DSQ | Disqualified | FS | False start | DNF | Did not finish |

=== Final ===
| Rank | Name | Nation | Time | Notes |
|---|---|---|---|---|
| 1st place, gold medalist(s) | Luis Arturo Paiva | Venezuela | 49.03 | |
| 2nd place, silver medalist(s) | Edixon Pirela | Venezuela | 49.69 | |
| 3rd place, bronze medalist(s) | Michael Murray | United States | 51.66 | |
| 4 | Williams Barreto | Venezuela | 53.28 | |
| 5 | Ronny Mauricio Santos Iza | Ecuador | 53.53 | |
| 6 | Holden Gill | Canada | 53.62 | |
| 7 | Christian Arredondo | Mexico | 56.16 | |
| | Damian Carcelen | Ecuador | DSQ | |
