= Athletics at the 2015 Parapan American Games =

- Venue: CIBC Athletics Stadium
- Dates: August 10 - August 14

Athletics contests were held at the 2015 Parapan American Games from August 10 to 14 at the CIBC Athletics Stadium in Toronto, Canada.

== Schedule ==
All times are Central Standard Time (UTC-6).

Heats	Final

Date		10 Aug		11 Aug		12 Aug		13 Aug		14 Aug
Heats / Finals		H	F	H	F	H	F	H	F	F
100 metres	Men	T11; T12; T47	T35; T36; T47; T53; T54		T11; T12; T13; T37; T38; T42; T44; T52		T37; T38; T64			
100 metres	Women	T12	T38	T47	T11; T12; T52	T53	T47			T36; T37
200 metres	Men				T36	T11	T12	T38; T47	T11; T36; T38; T52	T37; T44; T47
200 metres	Women				T36	T11; T47	T37	T12	T38; T47	T11; T12
400 metres	Men	T11; T12	T38		T11; T12; T20		T37; T47; T54		T52	T36; T53
400 metres	Women			T12	T54	T53	T12	T11	T37	T11; T38; T53
800 metres	Men			T53		T54			T53; T54	T34
800 metres	Women							T12	T54	
1500 metres	Men						T13; T38			T11; T12; T52; T54
1500 metres	Women								T11; T12	
5000 metres	Men		T11; T54		T12					
5000 metres	Women			T54						
4 × 100 metres relay	Men									T11-13
High jump	Men								T42/44/47	
Long jump	Men		T43/44; T38		T20; T47		T11/12		T47	T13
Long jump	Women				T11/12		T20/37/38			
Shot put	Men		F20		F46; F56/57		F32/33/34		F57	F56
Shot put	Women		F35/36		F56/57		F20/37/38; F53/54/55		F11/12	
Discus throw	Men		F11; F37; F51/52/53/57		F54/55/56		F37/38/44		F44	
Discus throw	Women				F51/52				F54/55; F56/57	F57
Javelin throw	Men				F11/12		F53/54/55		F34/57; F56	F44; F46
Javelin throw	Women				F37/38		F34		F53/54	F11/12; F55/56
Club throw	Women		F31/32/51							

== Medal table ==
Brazil won the most medals while the hosts, Canada, were third with a total of 43 medals.

* Host nation (Canada)

Rank	Nation	Gold	Silver	Bronze	Total
1	Brazil	34	28	18	80
2	United States	19	21	13	53
3	Canada*	19	11	13	43
4	Cuba	11	8	8	27
5	Mexico	10	8	14	32
6	Colombia	7	17	16	40
7	Argentina	4	8	5	17
8	Venezuela	3	10	17	30
9	Jamaica	2	2	1	5
10	Trinidad and Tobago	2	0	0	2
11	Chile	1	1	1	3
12	Ecuador	1	0	2	3
13	Bermuda	1	0	0	1
14	Nicaragua	0	0	3	3
Totals (14 entries)		114	114	111	339

== Medalists ==
=== Men's events ===
Event	Gold	Silver	Bronze
Men's 100m T11	David Brown (Guide: Jerome Avery); United States	Lucas Prado (Guide: Justino Barbosa dos Santos); Brazil	Delfo Jose Arce Orozco (Guide: Arley Barrios); Colombia
Men's 100m T12	Leinier Savon Pineda; Cuba	Josiah Jamison (Guide: Rolland James Slade); United States	Manuel Martinez; Mexico
Men's 100m T13	Gustavo Faria Araujo; Brazil	Luis Felipe Gutiérrez; Cuba	Daniel Manrique; Mexico
Men's 100m T35	Hernan Barreto; Argentina	Ayden Jent; United States	Nicolas Aravena; Argentina
Men's 100m T36	Juan Moreno Marquez; Colombia	Enrique Rotondo; Argentina	Rodrigo Parreira da Silva; Brazil
Men's 100m T37	Mateus Evangelista Cardoso; Brazil	Lucas Ferrari; Brazil	Omar Monterola; Venezuela
Men's 100m T38	Edson Pinheiro; Brazil	Kyle Whitehouse; Canada	Weiner Javier Diaz Mosquera; Colombia
Men's 100m T42	Shaquille Vance; United States	Regas Woods; United States	Desmond Jackson; United States
Men's 100m T44	Jarryd Wallace; United States	Alan Fonteles; Brazil	Andre de Oliveira; Brazil
Men's 100m T47	Petrucio Ferreira dos Santos; Brazil	Raciel González; Cuba	Yohansson Nascimento; Brazil
Men's 100m T52	Raymond Martin; United States	Gianfranco Iannotta; United States	Paul Nitz; United States
Men's 100m T53	Brent Lakatos; Canada	Ariosvaldo Fernandes; Brazil	Jean-Philippe Maranda; Canada
Men's 100m T54	Sairo Moises Fernandez Lopez; Colombia	Juan Cervantes; Mexico	Javier Rojas Diaz; Colombia
Men's 200m T11	David Brown (Guide: Jerome Avery); United States	Felipe Gomes (Guide:Jorge Pereira Borges); Brazil	Daniel Silva (Guide: Heitor de Oliveira Sales); Brazil
Men's 200m T12	Leinier Savon Pineda; Cuba	Diogo Jeronimo da Silva; Brazil	Manuel Martinez; Mexico
Men's 200m T36	Juan Moreno Marquez; Colombia	Enrique Rotondo; Argentina	Gabriel de Jesus Cuadra Holmann; Nicaragua
Men's 200m T37	Mateus Evangelista Cardoso; Brazil	Omar Monterola; Venezuela	Paulo Pereira; Brazil
Men's 200m T38	Kyle Whitehouse; Canada	Dixon de Jesus Hooker Velasquez; Colombia	Edson Pinheiro; Brazil
Men's 200m T44	Alan Fonteles; Brazil	David Prince; United States	Not awarded
Men's 200m T47	Petrucio Ferreira; Brazil	Yohansson Nascimento; Brazil	Ernesto Blanco; Cuba
Men's 200m T52	Gianfranco Iannotta; United States	Salvador Hernandez; Mexico	Cristian Torres; Colombia
Men's 400m T11	Felipe Gomes (Guide:Jorge Pereira Borges); Brazil	Dustin Walsh (Guide:Dylan Williamson); Canada	Not Awarded
Men's 400m T12	Manuel Martinez; Mexico	Luis Galano; Cuba	Valerys Larrondo; Cuba
Men's 400m T20	Luis Arturo Paiva; Venezuela	Edixon Pirela; Venezuela	Michael Murray; United States
Men's 400m T36	Juan Moreno Marquez; Colombia	Enrique Rotondo; Argentina	Gabriel de Jesus Cuadra Holmann; Nicaragua
Men's 400m T37	Paulo Pereira; Brazil	Omar Monterola; Venezuela	Mariano Dominguez; Argentina
Men's 400m T38	Dixon de Jesus Hooker Velasquez; Colombia	Weiner Javier Diaz Mosquera; Colombia	Carlos Castillo; Nicaragua
Men's 400m T47	Ernesto Blanco; Cuba	Shane Hudson; Jamaica	Ettiam Calderon; Cuba
Men's 400m T52	Raymond Martin; United States	Cristian Torres; Colombia	Salvador Hernandez; Mexico
Men's 400m T53	Brent Lakatos; Canada	Ariosvaldo Fernandes; Brazil	Jesus Aguilar; Venezuela
Men's 400m T54	Alex Dupont; Canada	Erik Hightower; United States	Sairo Moises Fernandez Lopez; Colombia
Men's 800m T53	Brent Lakatos; Canada	Edisson Martinez Sarmiento; Colombia	Jesus Aguilar; Venezuela
Men's 800m T54	Alex Dupont; Canada	Josh Cassidy; Canada	Juan Valladares; Venezuela
Men's 1500m T11	Odair Santos (Guide:Carlos dos Santos); Brazil	Jason Dunkerley (Guide:Josh Karanja); Canada	Cristian Valenzuela (Guide:Mauricio Valdiva); Chile
Men's 1500m T12	Yeltsin Jacques (Guide:Eriton de Aquino Nascimento); Brazil	German Angarita Otero; Colombia	Roger Rodriguez (Guide:Jordan Camejo Martinez); Venezuela
Men's 1500m T13	Guillaume Ouellet; Canada	Francisco Estrada; Mexico	David Garza; Mexico
Men's 1500m T20	Michael Brannigan; United States	Luis Arturo Paiva; Venezuela	Jovito Gutierrez; Venezuela
Men's 1500m T38	Mitchell Chase; Canada	Austin Handley; United States	Juan Carlos Medina Valencia; Colombia
Men's 1500m T52	Raymond Martin; United States	Steven Toyoji; United States	Isaiah Rigo; United States
Men's 1500m T54	Alex Dupont; Canada	Josh Cassidy; Canada	Javier Rojas Diaz; Colombia
Men's 5000m T11	Jason Dunkerley (Guide:Josh Karanja); Canada	Cristian Valenzuela; Chile	Darwin Castro (Guide:Sebastian Paul Rosero Armijos); Ecuador
Men's 5000m T12	Yeltsin Jacques (Guide:Eriton de Aquino Nascimento); Brazil	Charles Davis; United States	Elkin Serna (Guide:German Naranjo Jaramillo); Colombia
Men's 5000m T54	Daniel Romanchuk; United States	Josh Cassidy; Canada	Juan Valladares; Venezuela
Men's 4 × 100 m relay T11-13	Brazil (BRA) Lucas Prado (Guide: Justino Barbosa dos Santos); Gustavo Faria Araujo; Diogo Jeronimo da Silva; Felipe de Souza Gomes (Guide:Jorge Pereira Borges)	Argentina (ARG) Alexis Acosta (Guide: Ignacio Pignataro); Eduardo Aguilar (Guide: Juan Jasid); Alberto Cretton Salas (Guide: Bruno Zanacchi); Franco Bravo (Guide: Martin Sabio)	Colombia (COL) Jose Alexis Belizario Angulo (Guide: Geifer Rivas Palacios); Alexander Piamba Chilito (Guide: Jessi Chara Lasso); Delfo Jose Arce Orozco (Guide: Arley Barrios); Erwin Jadir Castillo Rodriguez
Men's high jump T42/44/47	Dion Townsend-Roberts; United States	Flavio Reitz; Brazil	Jeff Skiba; United States
Men's long jump T11/12	Elexis Gillette; United States	Leinier Savon Pineda; Cuba	Yohannis Lastre; Cuba
Men's long jump T13	Luis Felipe Gutiérrez; Cuba	Tyson Gunter; United States	Angel Jimenez; Cuba
Men's long jump T20	Ronny Mauricio Santos Iza; Ecuador	Jose Ortiz; Venezuela	Williams Barreto; Venezuela
Men's long jump T37	Mateus Evangelista Cardoso; Brazil	Daniel Tataren; Argentina	Ahkeel Whitehead; United States
Men's long jump T38	Pedro Neves da Silva; Brazil	Dixon de Jesus Hooker Velasquez; Colombia	Jose Mendoza; Venezuela
Men's long jump T42/44	Regas Woods; United States	Andre de Oliveira; Brazil	Rudy Garcia-Tolson; United States
Men's long jump T47	Dion Townsend-Roberts; United States	Tobi Fawehinmi; United States	Ettiam Calderon; Cuba
Men's shot put F11/12	Alessandro Rodrigo Silva; Brazil	Edwin Rodriguez Gonzalez; Colombia	Anibal Bello; Venezuela
Men's shot put F20	Josh Farrell; Canada	Danyelo Hernandez; Venezuela	Stalin David Mosquera; Ecuador
Men's shot put F32/33/34	Jason Roberts; Canada	Mauricio Valencia; Colombia	Kyle Pettey; Canada
Men's shot put F37	Joao Teixeira de Souza Silva; Brazil	Leandro Ricci; Argentina	Edwards Varela; Venezuela
Men's shot put F46	Abrahan Ortega; Venezuela	Lazaro Zamora; Cuba	Kenneth Trudgeon; Canada
Men's shot put F54/55	Johnatan Salinas Ventura; Mexico	André Rocha; Brazil	Alan Noriega Quiñones; Mexico
Men's shot put F56	Leonardo Diaz; Cuba	Jose Archer Llerandi; Mexico	Jairo Santiago; Mexico
Men's shot put F57	Thiago Paulino dos Santos; Brazil	Michael Wishnia; United States	Claudiney Batista; Brazil
Men's discus throw F11	Alessandro Rodrigo Silva; Brazil	Sergio Paz; Argentina	Sebastian Baldassarri; Argentina
Men's discus throw F37	Kevin Strybosch; Canada	Leandro Ricci; Argentina	Jair Hernandez Contreras; Mexico
Men's discus throw F44	Akeem Stewart; Trinidad and Tobago	Jeremy Campbell; United States	David Blair; United States
Men's discus throw F46	Joao dos Santos; Brazil	Lazaro Zamora; Cuba	Kenneth Trudgeon; Canada
Men's discus throw F51/52/53/57	Alphanso Cunningham; Jamaica	Claudiney Batista; Brazil	Thiago Paulino dos Santos; Brazil
Men's discus throw F54/55/56	Leonardo Diaz; Cuba	Tanto Campbell; Jamaica	Martin Perez; Mexico
Men's javelin throw F11/12	Jose Alexis Belizario Angulo; Colombia	Eduardo Danilo Franco Contreras; Colombia	Anibal Bello; Venezuela
Men's javelin throw F34/57	Claudiney Batista; Brazil	Mauricio Valencia; Colombia	Rommy Rodriguez; Venezuela
Men's javelin throw F44	Akeem Stewart; Trinidad and Tobago	Gerdan Fonseca; Cuba	Jeff Skiba; United States
Men's javelin throw F46	Eliezer Gabriel Buenaventura; Mexico	Abrahan Ortega; Venezuela	Daniel Gauna; Argentina
Men's javelin throw F53/54/55	Jonas Licurgo Ferreira; Brazil	Luis Alberto Zepeda Felix; Mexico	Alphanso Cunningham; Jamaica
Men's javelin throw F56	Tanto Campbell; Jamaica	Leonardo Diaz; Cuba	Johnnie Williams; United States

=== Women's events ===
Event	Gold	Silver	Bronze
Women's 100m T11	Terezinha Guilhermina (Guide: Guilherme Soares de Santana); Brazil	Jhulia Dos Santos (Guide: Fabio Dias de Oliveira Silva); Brazil	Jerusa Geber Dos Santos (Guide: Luiz Barboza da Silva); Brazil
Women's 100m T12	Omara Durand; Cuba	Alice Côrrea (Guide: Diogo Cardoso da Silva); Brazil	Greilyz Villaroel (Guide: Amilcar Zambrano Peña); Venezuela
Women's 100m T36	Yanina Martinez; Argentina	Tascitha Oliveira Cruz; Brazil	Martha Liliana Hernández Florián; Colombia
Women's 100m T37	Yescarly Medina; Venezuela	Berliana Castellanos; Venezuela	Lis Scaroni; Argentina
Women's 100m T38	Verônica Hipólito; Brazil	Jenifer Santos; Brazil	Lucia Muro; Mexico
Women's 100m T47	Yunidis Castillo; Cuba	Teresinha de Jesus Correia; Brazil	Sheila Finder; Brazil
Women's 100m T52	Michelle Stilwell; Canada	Kerri Morgan; United States	Cassie Mitchell; United States
Women's 100m T53	Jessica Cooper Lewis; Bermuda	Ilana Dupont; Canada	Jessica Frotten; Canada
Women's 200m T11	Terezinha Guilhermina (Guide: Guilherme Soares de Santana); Brazil	Thalita Simplicio (Guide: Felipe Veloso da Silva); Brazil	Not awarded
Women's 200m T12	Omara Durand; Cuba	Alice Côrrea (Guide: Diogo Cardoso da Silva); Brazil	Greilyz Villaroel (Guide: Amilcar Zambrano Peña); Venezuela
Women's 200m T36	Yanina Martinez; Argentina	Tascitha Oliveira Cruz; Brazil	Martha Liliana Hernández Florián; Colombia
Women's 200m T37	Lis Scaroni; Argentina	Berliana Castellanos; Venezuela	Leah Robinson; Canada
Women's 200m T38	Verônica Hipólito; Brazil	Jenifer Santos; Brazil	Lucia Muro; Mexico
Women's 200m T47	Yunidis Castillo; Cuba	Teresinha de Jesus Correia; Brazil	Sheila Finder; Brazil
Women's 400m T11	Terezinha Guilhermina (Guide: Guilherme Soares de Santana); Brazil	Thalita Simplicio (Guide: Felipe Veloso da Silva); Brazil	Jerusa Geber dos Santos (Guide: Luiz Barboza da Silva); Brazil
Women's 400m T12	Omara Durand; Cuba	Daniela Velasco (Guide: Jose Fuentes); Mexico	Marcela Gonzalez Arias (Guide: Geifer Rivas Palacios); Colombia
Women's 400m T38	Verônica Hipólito; Brazil	Leah Robinson; Canada	Maria Zamora; Mexico
Women's 400m T53	Chelsea McClammer; United States	Shirley Reilly; United States	Jessica Frotton; Canada
Women's 400m T54	Hannah McFadden; United States	Cheri Madsen; United States	Diane Roy; Canada
Women's 800m T12	Daniela Velasco (Guide: Jose Fuentes) (MEX)	Maritza Arango Buitrago (Guide: Johnathan Daybes Sanchez Gonzalez) (COL)	Marcela Gonzalez (Guide: Geifer Rivas Palacios) (COL)
Women's 800m T53	Chelsea McClammer; United States	Shirley Reilly; United States	Ilana Dupont; Canada
Women's 800m T54	Diane Roy; Canada	Hannah McFadden; United States	Cheri Madsen; United States
Women's 1500m T11	Maritza Arango Buitrago (Guide: Johnathan Daybes Sanchez Gonzalez); Colombia	Renata Bazone Teixeira (Guide: Fernando Martins Ribeiro Junior); Brazil	Mónica Olivia Rodríguez (Guide: Jorge Gaspar); Mexico
Women's 1500m T12	Margarita Faúndez (Guide: Rodrigo Mellado Donoso); Chile	Marcela Gonzalez (Guide: Geifer Rivas Palacios); Colombia	Isabel Osorio (Guide: Elixon Maldonado Pinto); Venezuela
Women's long jump T11/12	Silvânia Costa de Oliveira; Brazil	Thalita Simplicio; Brazil	Lorena Salvatini Spoladore; Brazil
Women's long jump T20/37/38	Adriele de Moraes; Brazil	Verônica Hipólito; Brazil	Norkelys Gonzalez; Venezuela
Women's shot put F11/12	Rebeca Valenzuela Álvarez; Mexico	Izabela Campos; Brazil	Yaumara Milan; Cuba
Women's shot put F20/37/38	Jennifer Brown; Canada	Renee Foessel; Canada	Shirlene Coelho; Brazil
Women's shot put F35/36	Marivana Oliveira; Brazil	Martha Liliana Hernández Florián; Colombia	Rosenei Herrera; Brazil
Women's shot put F53/54/55	Pamela LeJean; Canada	Elizabeth Rodrigues Gomes; Brazil	Érica Castaño; Colombia
Women's shot put F56/57	Angeles Ortiz; Mexico	Angela Madsen; United States	Roseane Santos; Brazil
Women's discus throw F11/12	Izabela Campos; Brazil	Yesenia Restrepo; Colombia	Ness Murby; Canada
Women's discus throw F37/38/44	Renee Foessel; Canada	Jennifer Brown; Canada	Shirlene Coelho; Brazil
Women's discus throw F51/52	Rachael Morrison; United States	Cassie Mitchell; United States	Becky Richter; Canada
Women's discus throw F54/55	Elizabeth Rodrigues Gomes; Brazil	Yanivé Torres Martinez; Colombia	Érica Castaño; Colombia
Women's discus throw F56/57	Veronica Saucedo; Mexico	Catalina Rosales; Mexico	Yenifer Paredes Muriel; Colombia
Women's javelin throw F11/12	Rebeca Valenzuela Álvarez; Mexico	Ness Murby; Canada	Yaumara Milan; Cuba
Women's javelin throw F37/38	Shirlene Santos de Souza; Brazil	Yomaira Cohen; Venezuela	Renee Foessel; Canada
Women's javelin throw F53/54	Maria Salas Marin; Mexico	Esther Rivera; Mexico	Pamela LeJean; Canada
Women's javelin throw F55/56	Angela Madsen; United States	Érica Castaño; Colombia	Raissa Machado; Brazil
Women's javelin throw F57	Karla Caudillo Torres; Mexico	Yenifer Paredes Muriel; Colombia	Jeny Velazco; Mexico
Women's club throw F31/32/51	Becky Richter; Canada	Rachael Morrison; United States	Cassie Mitchell; United States

== See also ==
- Athletics at the 2015 Pan American Games
