= Archery at the 2015 Parapan American Games – Recurve Women's =

Archery – Recurve Women's at the 2015 Parapan American Games
- Venue: Varsity Stadium
- Dates: August 9-10
- Competitors: 6 from 2 nations

Medalists
| 1st place, gold medalist(s) | | Natalie Wells | United States |
| 2nd place, silver medalist(s) | | Thais Silva Carvalho | Brazil |
| 3rd place, bronze medalist(s) | | Kinga Kiss-Johnson | United States |

The recurve women's competition of the archery events at the 2015 Parapan American Games was held between August 9 and 10 at Varsity Stadium. The defending Parapan American Games champion was Eileen Mary Ford of the United States.

== Schedule ==
All times are Central Standard Time (UTC-6).

| Date | Time | Round |
|---|---|---|
| 9 August | 10:00 | Ranking round |
| 9 August | 14:45 | Quarterfinals |
| 9 August | 15:30 | Semifinals |
| 10 August | 12:25 | Bronze medal match |
| 10 August | 12:49 | Final |

== Results ==
=== Ranking round ===
| Rank | Archer | Nation | Score | Notes |
|---|---|---|---|---|
| 1 | Thais Silva Carvalho | Brazil | 536 | PR |
| 2 | Natalie Wells | United States | 528 | |
| 3 | Kinga Kiss-Johnson | United States | 521 | |
| 4 | Fabiola Lorenzi Dergovics | Brazil | 517 | |
| 5 | Patricia O'Neill Layolle | Brazil | 507 | |
| | Lee Ford | United States | DNS | |

=== Competition rounds ===
Quarterfinals
5 | Patricia O'Neill Layolle (BRA) | 16 | 18 | 23 | 23
4 | Fabiola Lorenzi Dergovics (BRA) | 16 | 13 | 21 | 17

Semifinals
1 | Thais Silva Carvalho (BRA) | 20 | 21 | 18 | 16 | 23-T7
5 | Patricia O'Neill Layolle (BRA) | 17 | 24 | 18 | 18 | 13-T0
3 | Kinga Kiss-Johnson (USA) | 11 | 27 | 17 | 17
2 | Natalie Wells (USA) | 26 | 26 | 24 | 19

Final
1 | Thais Silva Carvalho (BRA) | 19 | 24 | 19 | 19
2 | Natalie Wells (USA) | 23 | 22 | 23 | 24
Third place
5 | Patricia O'Neill Layolle (BRA) | 23 | 20 | 20 | 20 | 15
3 | Kinga Kiss-Johnson (USA) | 24 | 22 | 20 | 19 | 19
