= Athletics at the 2015 Parapan American Games – Women's 100 metres T52 =

Athletics – Women's 100 metres T52 at the 2015 Parapan American Games
- Venue: CIBC Athletics Stadium
- Dates: August 11
- Competitors: 4 from 2 nations

Medalists
1st place, gold medalist(s)		Michelle Stilwell	Canada
2nd place, silver medalist(s)		Kerry Morgan	United States
3rd place, bronze medalist(s)		Cassie Mitchell	United States

The women's T52 (including T51 athletes) 100 metres competition of the athletics events at the 2015 Parapan American Games was held on August 11 at the CIBC Athletics Stadium.

== Records ==
Prior to this competition, the existing records were as follows:

=== T51 ===
World record	Cassie Mitchell (USA)	25.77	St. Paul, Minnesota, United States of America	June 20, 2015
Americas record	Cassie Mitchell (USA)	25.77	St. Paul, Minnesota, United States of America	June 20, 2015

=== T52 ===
World record	Michelle Stilwell (CAN)	18.67	Windsor, Canada	July 14, 2012
Americas record	Michelle Stilwell (CAN)	18.67	Windsor, Canada	July 14, 2012
Parapan Record	Cheryl Leitner (USA)	23.38	Rio de Janeiro, Brazil	August 16, 2007

== Schedule ==
All times are Central Standard Time (UTC-6).

Date	Time	Round
11 August	17:14	Final

== Results ==
All times are shown in seconds.

KEY:	q	Fastest non-qualifiers	Q	Qualified	PR	Parapan American Games record	AR	Area record	NR	National record	PB	Personal best	SB	Seasonal best	DSQ	Disqualified	FS	False start

=== Final ===
All athletes are classified as T52 unless indicated.
Wind: +3.1 m/s

Rank	Name	Nation	Time	Notes
1st place, gold medalist(s)	Michelle Stilwell	Canada	19.58	
2nd place, silver medalist(s)	Kerry Morgan	United States	19.92	
3rd place, bronze medalist(s)	Cassie Mitchell	United States	25.63	T51
4	Becky Richter	Canada	31.66	T51
