= Ben Thompson (archer) =

American para-archer (born 1982)

Personal information
- Born: September 13, 1982 (age 43) Buffalo, Illinois, U.S.

Sport
- Sport: Archery
Medal record
Paralympic archery
Representing United States
World Championships
Gold medal – first place	2025 Gwangju	Double

Ben Thompson (born September 13, 1982) is an American para-archer since 2014. As a compound archery competitor, Thompson won bronze at the 2015 Parapan American Games. At the World Para Archery Championships, Thompson was first in 2017 and 2019 in the men's open compound. During the men's open compound team events with the United States, Thompson was first in 2015 and third in 2017. He also competed at the 2022 World Para Archery Championships and 2022 World Games.

While competing with the American men's compound team, Thompson and his teammates broke the record during the 2017 Juan Enrique Barrios Cup and the 2019 World Archery Para Championships. Between 2019 and 2021, Thompson reached number one twice on the World Archery Rankings. Thompson was named the Male Paralympic Athlete of the Year for the United States Olympic & Paralympic Committee in 2019. The following year, he won the Para men category for 2019 from World Archery.

== Early life and education ==
Thompson was born in Buffalo, Illinois on September 13, 1982, and spent his childhood at a farm. Thompson was on several sports teams while attending high school. During his teens, he participated in 3D archery events. He went to Lincoln Land Community College for his post-secondary studies and studied aircraft mechanics.

== Career ==
=== Aviation and archery ===
In 2009, Thompson began his career with Boeing. Between 2009 and 2019, Thompson focused on the various parts of the 787 Dreamliner while in North Charleston, South Carolina. During his time at Boeing, Thompson had a back injury in 2009 after a motorcycle accident. That year, he underwent rehabilitation and began using a wheelchair. While undergoing medical treatment during 2013, Thompson resumed his archery experience. For USA Archery, he joined their compound Athlete Advisory Council in 2022.

=== Competitions ===
==== Individual ====
In 2013, Thompson began participating in compound archery. The following year, he went to the USA Archery Arizona Cup and became a para-archer. With USA Archery, Thompson won the men's para compound open event at the National Target Championships during 2019. The following year, he won this event during the 2020 USA Archery Target Nationals.

At international events, Thompson won a bronze medal in the men's open compound event held at the 2015 Parapan American Games. The following year, Thompson considered ending his archery career when he did not qualify for the 2016 Paralympic Games. As a World Para Archery Championships competitor, Thompson was third at the men's open compound in 2017. During the late 2010s, Thompson became injured and stopped competing before resuming his archery career in April 2019. That year, Thompson won the men's open compound event at the World Para Archery Championships.

Between 2019 and 2021, he was number one on the World Archery Rankings twice. During the 2022 World Para Archery Championships, Thompson was seventh in the men's open compound. At the 2022 World Games, Thompson reached the first round of the men's compound event.

==== Team ====
During the World Para Archery Championships with the American men's compound open team, Thompson was first in 2015 and third in 2017. While at the 2017 Juan Enrique Barrios Cup, Thompson's 2063 points in the men's compound open team event alongside Andre Shelby and Kevin Polish made a new world record. With 2091 points, Thompson, Shelby and Matt Stutzman broke the men's compound open team record during the World Archery Para Championships in 2019.

== Awards and personal life ==
In 2019, Thompson received the Male Paralympic Athlete of the Year from the United States Olympic & Paralympic Committee. The following year, Thompson won the Para men category from World Archery for 2019. Outside of archery, he is the parent of a teenager.
