= Pamela LeJean =

Canadian former para-athlete (born 1984)

Personal information
- Born: 12 November 1984 (age 41) Cape Breton, Nova Scotia, Canada

Sport
- Sport: Paralympic athletics
Medal record
Representing Canada
World Championships
| Silver medal – second place | 2015 Doha | Shot put F53 |
| Bronze medal – third place | 2013 Lyon | Shot put F53 |
Parapan American Games
| Gold medal – first place | 2015 Toronto | Javelin throw F53 |
| Bronze medal – third place | 2015 Toronto | Shot put F53 |

Pamela Moore (née LeJean; born November 12, 1984) is a Canadian former para-athlete.

== Early life and education ==
LeJean was born on November 12, 1984, in Cape Breton, Nova Scotia. Growing up, she enjoyed playing basketball in school, which she did from grade 5 to grade 10. Following her junior year at Glace Bay High School where she had begun to play rugby, LeJean suffered a spinal cord injury in a motor accident that left her paralyzed from the waist down. Upon returning to school, she was pushed by former Olympian Sue MacLeod to return to sports and complete her rehabilitation in the pool. She began to swim competitively, with the goal of qualifying for Canada's national swimming team, but developed tendonitis in both shoulders and was forced to quit.

LeJean enrolled in Cape Breton University for her undergraduate degree in political science and communications before moving to Halifax to work with Communications Nova Scotia.

== Career ==
While living in Halifax, LeJean was encouraged by her friends to start playing wheelchair basketball due to her love of the sport. She attended the 2011 Canada Games and approached coach Steve Sampson about qualifying for the team. He told her she was out of shape and must push herself in her wheelchair at least five kilometers a day. After a month of training, she began playing wheelchair basketball competitively until her tendonitis flared up again. Her coach then suggested that she try track and field and throwing sports due her to wide wingspan. According to her, she threw the national standard on her first try.

2013 was a career-changing year for LeJean, who made her international track and field debut and was asked to join the Canadian Para-National Team. She trained in Edmonton before attending her first international tournament in Arizona where she won two silver medals. From there, LeJean drew attention from the Canadian national senior team after winning a gold and silver medal in the parashot put and para discuss events during the Canada Summer Games. While training in Ottawa, LeJean was made aware that she was named to Canada's senior national team and would be flown out to Lyon, France to compete with Canada at the 2013 IPC Athletics World Championships. In her national team debut, she won a bronze medal in shotput and was later named the Canadian Top Athlete of the Year.

Leading up to the 2016 Paralympic Games, LeJean competed in international tournaments around the world including Dubai, Toronto, and Qatar. At the 2015 IPC Athletics World Championships in Qatar she earned a silver medal in the T53 shot put women's final and later took home a gold medal at the 2015 Parapan American Games. Prior to qualifying for the Paralympic Games, LeJean also set a new North American shot put record at the 2016 Aileen Meagher International Track Classic. At the women's para-shot put event, she threw 4.48 metres to beat her previous personal best of 4.46 metres and win gold.

On August 11, 2016, LeJean was one of 24 Canadians named to Team Canada's Track and Field roster for the 2016 Paralympic Games in Brazil. Competing in the women's F53 shot put event, she missed the podium and placed fourth overall. She bounced back from the loss and by 2018, was ranked number 1 in shot put and javelin and number 2 in discuss.

LeJean announced her retirement from the sport in August 2019, ending her career as the Canadian record holder in the F53 discus, javelin, and shot put. A few months later, she was announced as an inductee into the Cape Breton Sports Hall of Fame.
