= Athletics at the 2015 Parapan American Games – Men's 100 metres T44 =

Athletics – Men's 100 metres T44 at the 2015 Parapan American Games
- Venue: CIBC Athletics Stadium
- Dates: August 11
- Competitors: 5 from 3 nations

Medalists
1st place, gold medalist(s)		Jarryd Wallace	United States
2nd place, silver medalist(s)		Alan Fonteles Cardoso de Oliveira	Brazil
3rd place, bronze medalist(s)		Andre de Oliveira	Brazil

The men's T44 (including T43 athletes) 100 metres competition of the athletics events at the 2015 Parapan American Games was held on August 11 at the CIBC Athletics Stadium. The defending Parapan American Games champion was Jarryd Wallace of the United States of America.

== Records ==
Prior to this competition, the existing were as follows:

=== T43 ===
World record	Alan Fonteles Cardoso Oliveira (BRA)	10.57	London, Great Britain	28 July 2013
Americas Record	Alan Fonteles Cardoso Oliveira (BRA)	10.57	London, Great Britain	28 July 2013
Parapan Am Record	Blake Leeper (USA)	11.35	Guadalajara, Mexico	14 November 2011

=== T44 ===
World record	Richard Browne (USA)	10.75	London, Great Britain	28 July 2013
Americas Record	Richard Browne (USA)	10.75	London, Great Britain	28 July 2013
Parapan Am Record	Marlon Shirley (USA)	11.05	Rio de Janeiro, Brazil	14 August 2007

=== Broken Records ===
==== T43 ====
Parapan Am Record	Alan Fonteles Cardoso Oliveira (BRA)	10.98	Toronto, Canada	11 August 2015

==== T44 ====
World Record	Jarryd Wallace (USA)	10.71	Toronto, Canada	11 August 2015
Americas Record	Jarryd Wallace (USA)	10.71	Toronto, Canada	11 August 2015
Parapan Am Record	Jarryd Wallace (USA)	10.71	Toronto, Canada	11 August 2015

== Schedule ==
All times are Central Standard Time (UTC-6).

Date	Time	Round
11 August	16:35	Final

== Results ==
All times are shown in seconds.

KEY:	q	Fastest non-qualifiers	Q	Qualified	PR	Parapan American Games record	AR	Area record	NR	National record	PB	Personal best	SB	Seasonal best	DSQ	Disqualified	FS	False start

=== Final ===
All athletes are classified as T44 unless indicated.
Wind +1.7 m/s

Rank	Name	Nation	Time	Notes
1st place, gold medalist(s)	Jarryd Wallace	United States	10.71	WR
2nd place, silver medalist(s)	Alan Fonteles Cardoso de Oliveira	Brazil	10.98	T43, PR
3rd place, bronze medalist(s)	Andre de Oliveira	Brazil	12.33	
4	Cody Salomons	Canada	12.63	PB
	Richard Browne	United States	DNS	
