= Athletics at the 2015 Parapan American Games – Men's 200 metres T44 =

Athletics – Men's 200 metres T44 at the 2015 Parapan American Games
- Venue: CIBC Athletics Stadium
- Dates: August 14
- Competitors: 3 from 2 nations

Medalists
1st place, gold medalist(s)		Alan Fonteles Cardoso de Oliveira	Brazil
2nd place, silver medalist(s)		David Prince	United States

The men's T44 (including T43 athletes) 200 metres competition of the athletics events at the 2015 Parapan American Games was held between August 14 at the CIBC Athletics Stadium. The defending Parapan American Games champion was David Prince of Cuba.

== Records ==
Prior to this competition, the existing records were as follows:

=== T43 ===
World record	Alan Fonteles Cardoso de Oliveira (BRA)	20.66	Lyon, France	21 July 2013
Americas record	Alan Fonteles Cardoso de Oliveira (BRA)	20.66	Lyon, France	21 July 2013
Parapan record	Alan Fonteles Cardoso de Oliveira (BRA)	22.82	Guadalajara, Mexico	18 November 2011

=== T44 ===
World record	Richard Browne (USA)	21.62	Brussels, Belgium	5 September 2014
Americas record	Richard Browne (USA)	21.62	Brussels, Belgium	5 September 2014
Parapan Am record	David Prince (USA)	22.70	Guadalajara, Mexico	18 November 2011

=== Broken records ===
==== T43 ====
Parapan Am Record	Alan Fonteles Cardoso de Oliveira (BRA)	22.08	Toronto, Canada	14 August 2015

==== T44 ====
Parapan Am Record	David Prince (USA)	22.69	Toronto, Canada	14 August 2015

== Schedule ==
All times are Central Standard Time (UTC-6).

Date	Time	Round
14 August	16:25	Final

== Results ==
All times are shown in seconds.

KEY:	q	Fastest non-qualifiers	Q	Qualified	PR	Parapan American Games record	AR	Area record	NR	National record	PB	Personal best	SB	Seasonal best	DSQ	Disqualified	FS	False start

=== Final ===
Athletes are classified as T44 unless indicated.
Wind: -1.6 m/s

Rank	Name	Nation	Time	Notes
1st place, gold medalist(s)	Alan Fonteles Cardoso de Oliveira	Brazil	22.08	PR, T43
2nd place, silver medalist(s)	David Prince	United States	22.69	PR
	Richard Browne	United States		Did not start
