= Archery at the 2015 Parapan American Games – Compound Women's =

Archery – Compound Women's at the 2015 Parapan American Games
- Dates: August 9-10
- Competitors: 5 from 3 nations

Medalists
1st place, gold medalist(s)		Jane Karla Gogel	Brazil
2nd place, silver medalist(s)		Karen Van Nest	Canada
3rd place, bronze medalist(s)		Martha Chavez	United States

The compound women's competition of the archery events at the 2015 Parapan American Games was held between August 9 and 10 at the Varsity Stadium.

== Schedule ==
All times are Central Standard Time (UTC-6).

Date	Time	Round
9 August	10:00	Ranking round
9 August	14:45	Quarterfinals
9 August	15:30	Semifinals
10 August	10:00	Bronze medal match
10 August	10:24	Final

== Results ==
=== Ranking round ===
Rank	Archer	Nation	Score	Notes
1	Jane Karla Gogel	Brazil	664	
2	Karen Van Nest	Canada	645	
3	Martha Chavez	United States	623	
4	Helba Aparecida Borges	Brazil	549	
5	Samantha Tucker	United States	506	

=== Competition rounds ===
Quarterfinals
5	Samantha Tucker (USA)	109
4	Helba Apparecida Borges (BRA)	121

Semifinals
1	Jane Karla Gogel (BRA)	136
4	Helba Apparecida Borges (BRA)	122
3	Martha Chavez (USA)	121
2	Karen Van Nest (CAN)	140

Final
1	Jane Karla Gogel (BRA)	140
2	Karen Van Nest (CAN)	132
Third place
4	Helba Apparecida Borges (BRA)	125
2	Martha Chavez (USA)	133
