= USOC Athlete of the Year =

American Olympic award

The USOPC Athlete of the Year (historically USOC Athlete of the Year) awards are part of a series of awards presented by the United States Olympic & Paralympic Committee to athletes who have distinguished themselves in one of the Olympic or Paralympic sports. Awards are presented to the Olympic or Paralympic SportsMan of the Year, SportsWoman of the Year, and Team of the Year.

Historically, all awards were presented annually. Starting in 2014, the award structure was changed as follows:

- Performances by the best athletes and teams in the Olympics and Paralympics are honored with the Team USA Awards—Athlete of the Olympic Games (both male and female), Team of the Olympic Games, Athlete of the Paralympic Games (both male and female), and Team of the Paralympic Games. These are presented in Olympic and Paralympic years (normally even-numbered, though the 2020 Summer Olympics have been delayed to 2021).
- The Athlete of the Year, Paralympian of the Year, and Team of the Year awards are presented in other years.

Nominees for each award are submitted by the national governing bodies of Olympic, Paralympic, and Pan American Games sports, and by their affiliated able-bodied and disabled sports organizations. Winners are selected by a vote of the USOPC awards committee, consisting of USOPC representatives, media representatives, and Olympic athletes.

The SportsMan and SportsWoman of the Year awards were first presented in 1974; the Team of the Year award was added in 1996 and the Paralympian of the Year award was added in 2004. The Paralympian award was subdivided into men's and women's awards in 2009, with the Paralympic Team of the Year award added at that time.

== SportsMan of the Year ==
- 1974 — Jim Bolding, athletics
- 1975 — Clinton Jackson, boxing
- 1976 — John Naber, swimming
- 1977 — Eric Heiden, speed skating
- 1978 — Bruce Davidson, equestrianism
- 1979 — Eric Heiden, speed skating
- 1980 — Eric Heiden, speed skating
- 1981 — Scott Hamilton, figure skating
- 1982 — Greg Louganis, diving
- 1983 — Rick McKinney, archery
- 1984 — Edwin Moses, athletics
- 1985 — Willie Banks, athletics
- 1986 — Matt Biondi, swimming
- 1987 — Greg Louganis, diving
- 1988 — Matt Biondi, swimming
- 1989 — Roger Kingdom, athletics
- 1990 — John T. Smith, wrestling (freestyle)
- 1991 — Carl Lewis, athletics
- 1992 — Pablo Morales, swimming
- 1993 — Michael Johnson, athletics
- 1994 — Dan Jansen, speed skating
- 1995 — Michael Johnson, athletics
- 1996 — Michael Johnson, athletics
- 1997 — Pete Sampras, tennis
- 1998 — Jonny Moseley, skiing (freestyle)
- 1999 — Lance Armstrong, cycling (road)
- 2000 — Rulon Gardner, wrestling (Greco-Roman)
- 2001 — Lance Armstrong, cycling (road)
- 2002 — Lance Armstrong, cycling (road)
- 2003 — Lance Armstrong, cycling (road)
- 2004 — Michael Phelps, swimming
- 2005 — Hunter Kemper, triathlon
- 2006 — Joey Cheek, speed skating
- 2007 — Tyson Gay, athletics
- 2008 — Michael Phelps, swimming
- 2009 — Todd Lodwick, skiing (Nordic combined)
- 2010 — Evan Lysacek, figure skating
- 2011–12 — Michael Phelps, swimming
- 2012–13 — Ted Ligety, skiing (alpine)
- 2014–15 — Jordan Burroughs, wrestling (freestyle)
- 2016 — Michael Phelps, swimming
- 2017 — Kyle Snyder, wrestling (freestyle)
- 2018 — Shaun White, snowboarding
- 2019 — Nathan Chen, figure skating

== SportsWoman of the Year ==
- 1974 — Shirley Babashoff, swimming
- 1975 — Kathy Heddy, swimming
- 1976 — Sheila Young, speed skating
- 1977 — Linda Fratianne, figure skating
- 1978 — Tracy Caulkins, swimming
- 1979 — Cynthia Woodhead, swimming
- 1980 — Beth Heiden, speedskating
- 1981 — Sheila Young Ochowicz, cycling/speed skating
- 1982 — Melanie Smith, equestrian
- 1983 — Tamara McKinney, skiing (alpine)
- 1984 — Tracy Caulkins, swimming
- 1985 — Mary Decker Slaney, athletics
- 1986 — Jackie Joyner-Kersee, athletics
- 1987 — Jackie Joyner-Kersee, athletics
- 1988 — Florence Griffith Joyner, athletics
- 1989 — Janet Evans, swimming
- 1990 — Lynn Jennings, athletics
- 1991 — Kim Zmeskal, gymnastics (artistic)
- 1992 — Bonnie Blair, speed skating
- 1993 — Gail Devers, athletics
- 1994 — Bonnie Blair, speed skating
- 1995 — Picabo Street, skiing (alpine)
- 1996 — Amy Van Dyken, swimming
- 1997 — Tara Lipinski, figure skating
- 1998 — Picabo Street, skiing (alpine)
- 1999 — Jenny Thompson, swimming
- 2000 — Marion Jones, athletics
- 2001 — Jennifer Capriati, tennis
- 2002 — Sarah Hughes, figure skating
- 2003 — Michelle Kwan, figure skating
- 2004 — Carly Patterson, gymnastics (artistic)
- 2005 — Katie Hoff, swimming
- 2006 — Hannah Teter, snowboarding
- 2007 — Katie Hoff, swimming
- 2008 — Natalie Coughlin, swimming and Nastia Liukin, gymnastics (artistic)
- 2009 — Lindsey Vonn, skiing (alpine)
- 2010 — Lindsey Vonn, skiing (alpine)
- 2011–12 — Allyson Felix, track & field
- 2012–13 — Katie Ledecky, swimming
- 2014–15 — Simone Biles, gymnastics (artistic)
- 2016 — Katie Ledecky, swimming
- 2017 — Katie Ledecky, swimming
- 2018 – Chloe Kim, snowboarding
- 2019 — Simone Biles, gymnastics (artistic)

== Team of the Year ==
- 1996 — Women's National/Olympic Basketball Team
- 1997 — Women's National Soccer Team
- 1998 — Women's Olympic Ice Hockey Team
- 1999 — U.S. Women's World Cup Team
- 2000 — USA Baseball Olympic Team
- 2001 — US Postal Service Cycling Team
- 2002 — Women's Bobsled Team (Jill Bakken and Vonetta Flowers)
- 2003 — Women's Gymnastics Team
- 2004 — U.S. Olympic Softball Team
- 2005 — Men's Badminton Doubles Team (T. Gunawan, H. Bach)
- 2006 — U.S. Olympic Men's Curling Team
- 2007 — U.S. Women's World Championships Gymnastics
- 2008 — U.S. Olympic Men's Indoor Volleyball Team
- 2009 — U.S. Four-Man Bobsled Team (Steven Holcomb, Steve Mesler, Justin Olsen, Curt Tomasevicz)
- 2010 — U.S. Four-Man Bobsled Team (Steven Holcomb, Justin Olsen, Steve Mesler, Curt Tomasevicz)
- 2011–12 — Women's Eight Rowing Team
- 2012–13 — Men's Tennis Doubles Team (Bob and Mike Bryan)
- 2014–15 — U.S. Women's World Cup Team
- 2016 — U.S. Women's Gymnastics Team
- 2017 — Women's National Ice Hockey Team
- 2018 — Women's National Ice Hockey Team
- 2019 — U.S. Women's World Cup Team

== Paralympian of the Year ==
"These prestigious awards recognize the outstanding contributions these athletes have made to Olympic and Paralympic sport as well as the positive example they have set for all Americans,” said USOC Chief Executive Officer Jim Scherr. “Each of our winners exemplifies great sportsmanship and strength of character both on and off the field, and all are worthy additions to the distinguished list of past recipients."

- 2004 — Erin Popovich, swimming
- 2005 — Laurie Stephens, alpine skiing
- 2006 — Jessica Long, swimming
- 2007 — Jessica Galli, athletics
- 2008 — Erin Popovich, swimming

== Paralympic SportsMan of the Year ==
- 2009 — Steve Cash, sled hockey
- 2010 — Taylor Chace, sled hockey
- 2011–12 — Raymond Martin, track & field
- 2012–13 — Raymond Martin, track & field

== Male Paralympic Athlete of the Year ==
- 2014–15 — Joe Berenyi, cycling
- 2016 — Brad Snyder, swimming
- 2017 — Mikey Brannigan, track and field
- 2018 — Dan Cnossen, Nordic skiing
- 2019 — Ben Thompson, archery

== Paralympic SportsWoman of the Year ==
- 2009 — Stephani Victor, alpine skiing
- 2010 — Alana Nichols, alpine skiing
- 2011–12 — Jessica Long, swimming
- 2012–13 — Monica Bascio, cycling

== Female Paralympic Athlete of the Year ==
- 2014–15 — Tatyana McFadden, track and field
- 2016 — Tatyana McFadden, track and field
- 2017 — Tatyana McFadden, track and field
- 2018 —Oksana Masters, Nordic skiing
- 2019 —Oksana Masters, Nordic skiing

== Paralympic Team of the Year ==
- 2009 — U.S. National Sled Hockey Team
- 2010 — U.S. Paralympic Sled Hockey Team
- 2011–12 — Men's Quad Doubles Tennis Team
- 2012–13 — U.S. Men's 4x100-Meter Relay Team
- 2014–15 — U.S. National Sled Hockey Team
- 2016 — U.S. Women's Sitting Volleyball Team
- 2017 — U.S. National Sled Hockey Team
- 2018 — U.S. National Sled Hockey Team
- 2019 — U.S. National Sled Hockey Team

== See also ==
- United States Olympic Hall of Fame
- List of sports awards honoring women
