= Leah Robinson =

Leah Robinson may refer:

- Leah Robinson (soccer), Canadian soccer player
- Leah Robinson (athlete), Canadian paralympic sprinter
