= Athletics at the 2015 Parapan American Games – Men's 100 metres T12 =

Athletics – Men's 100 metres T12 at the 2015 Parapan American Games
- Venue: CIBC Athletics Stadium
- Dates: August 10–11
- Competitors: 11 from 8 nations

Medalists
1st place, gold medalist(s)		Leinier Savon	Cuba
2nd place, silver medalist(s)		Josiah Jamison (Guide: Rolland James Slade)	United States
3rd place, bronze medalist(s)		Manuel Martinez	Mexico

The men's T12 100 metres competition of the athletics events at the 2015 Parapan American Games was held between August 10 and 11 at the CIBC Athletics Stadium. The defending Parapan American Games champion was Yoldani Silva of Venezuela.

== Records ==
Prior to this competition, the existing records were as follows:

World record	Elchin Muradov (AZE)	10.66	Imola, Italy	19 June 2010
Americas Record	Josiah Jamison (USA)	10.89	Beijing, China	10 September 2008
Parapan Am Record	Julio Roque (CUB)	11.11	Rio de Janeiro, Brazil	19 August 2007

== Schedule ==
All times are Central Standard Time (UTC-6).

Date	Time	Round
10 August	16:10	Semifinal 1
10 August	16:15	Semifinal 2
10 August	16:20	Semifinal 3
11 August	17:45	Final

== Results ==
All times are shown in seconds.

KEY:	q	Fastest non-qualifiers	Q	Qualified	PR	Parapan American Games record	NR	National record	PB	Personal best	SB	Seasonal best	DSQ	Disqualified	FS	False start

=== Semifinals ===
The fastest from each heat and next overall fastest qualified for the final.

==== Semifinal 1 ====
Wind +2.6 m/s

Rank	Name	Nation	Time	Notes
1	Josiah Jamison (Guide: Rolland James Slade)	United States	11.13	Q
2	Benjamin Gonzalez	Mexico	11.20	q
3	Edurdo Aguilar (Guide: Juan Jasid)	Argentina	11.55	
4	Alexander Piamba Chilito (Guide: Jessi Chara Lasso)	Colombia	12.06	

==== Semifinal 2 ====
Wind +0.6 m/s

Rank	Name	Nation	Time	Notes
1	Manuel Martinez	Mexico	11.26	Q, PB
2	Diogo Jeronimo da Silva	Brazil	11.37	
3	Biondi Misasi	Suriname	11.81	

==== Semifinal 3 ====
Wind +2.9 m/s

Rank	Name	Nation	Time	Notes
1	Leinier Savon	Cuba	10.95	Q
2	George Quarcoo (Guide: Adam Johnson)	Canada	11.56	
3	Erwin Jadir Castillo Rodriguez	Colombia	11.99	

=== Final ===
Wind +2.8 m/s

Rank	Name	Nation	Time	Notes
1st place, gold medalist(s)	Leinier Savon	Cuba	10.61	
2nd place, silver medalist(s)	Josiah Jamison (Guide: Rolland James Slade)	United States	11.15	
3rd place, bronze medalist(s)	Manuel Martinez	Mexico	11.18	
4	Benjamin Gonzalez	Mexico	28.43	
