= Archery at the 2015 Parapan American Games – Recurve Men's =

Archery – Recurve Men's at the 2015 Parapan American Games
- Venue: Varsity Stadium
- Dates: August 9–10
- Competitors: 6 from 4 nations

Medalists
| 1st place, gold medalist(s) | | Luciano Rezende | Brazil |
| 2nd place, silver medalist(s) | | Eric Bennett | United States |
| 3rd place, bronze medalist(s) | | Timothy Palumbo | United States |

The recurve men's competition of the archery events at the 2015 Parapan American Games was held between August 9 and 10 at Varsity Stadium. The defending Parapan American Games champion was Jose Antonio Baez of Mexico.

== Schedule ==
All times are Central Standard Time (UTC-6).

| Date | Time | Round |
|---|---|---|
| 9 August | 10:00 | Ranking round |
| 9 August | 14:45 | Quarterfinals |
| 9 August | 15:30 | Semi-Finals |
| 10 August | 13:13 | Bronze medal match |
| 10 August | 13:37 | Final |

== Results ==
WR world record | AR area record | CR championship record | GR games record | NR national record | OR Olympic record | PB personal best | SB season best | WL world leading (in a given season)

=== Ranking Round ===
| Rank | Archer | Nation | Score | Notes |
|---|---|---|---|---|
| 1 | Eric Bennett | United States | 635 | PB |
| 2 | Timothy Palumbo | United States | 626 | |
| 3 | Luciano Rezende | Brazil | 593 | |
| 4 | Diogo Sousa | Brazil | 565 | |
| 5 | German Gomez Perdomo | Colombia | 473 | |
| 6 | Jose Antonio Baez | Mexico | 459 | |

=== Competition rounds ===
Quarterfinals
5 | G Gomez Perdomo (COL) | 23 | 17 | 27 | 22 | 15
4 | D Sousa (BRA) | 22 | 26 | 23 | 23 | 26
3 | L Rezende (BRA) | 19 | 24 | 27
6 | J Baez (MEX) | 15 | 15 | 13

Semi-Finals
1 | E Bennett (USA) | 24 | 24 | 22 | 25 | 25
4 | D Sousa (BRA) | 22 | 27 | 21 | 25 | 22
3 | L Rezende (BRA) | 27 | 22 | 25 | 27
2 | T Palumbo (USA) | 25 | 24 | 23 | 20

Final
1 | E Bennett (USA) | 26 | 26 | 26 | 28 | 25
3 | L Rezende (BRA) | 27 | 29 | 23 | 24 | 28
Third place
4 | D Sousa (BRA) | 19 | 24 | 10
2 | T Palumbo (USA) | 23 | 25 | 22
