= Tri-City Community Unit School District 1 =

School district in Sangamon County, Illinois, United States

Tri-City Community Unit School District 1 a unit school district in Buffalo, Illinois, United States. Home of the Tornadoes and Tigers.

== Mission statement ==
"Education: Now and For the Future" is the mission statement of the rural Tri-City Schools which became the first unified school district in Illinois formed in 1938.

== Location ==
Tri-City Schools, located off I-72 and 10–12 minutes from Springfield, serve a 97 square miles (250 km^{2}) area. Primary towns include Buffalo, Dawson, and Mechanicsburg. The school and campus are located at Buffalo and house grades Pre-K - 12 in one large facility.

== Academics ==
Pre-K-12 student enrollment is stable at 700 allowing small classes. A state-approved technology plan and use of computers are in place to provide preparation in the use of technology. A range of curricula is offered at the middle school and high school levels. Several extracurricular activities are available for students as well.
