= Trinidad and Tobago at the 2015 Parapan American Games =

- IOC code: TTO
- NOC: Trinidad & Tobago Paralympic Committee
- Website: http://www.ttpconline.org/

in Toronto 7–15 August 2015
- Competitors: 4 in 3 sports
- Medals Ranked 11th: Gold 2 Silver 0 Bronze 0 Total 2

Parapan American Games appearances
- 1999; 2003; 2007; 2011; 2015; 2019; 2023

Trinidad and Tobago competed in the 2015 Parapan American Games.

== Competitors ==
The following table lists Trinidad and Tobago's delegation per sport and gender.

Sport	Men	Women	Total
Athletics	2	0	2
Swimming	0	1	1
Table Tennis	1	0	1
Total	3	1	4

== Medalists ==
The following competitors from Trinidad and Tobago won medals at the games. In the by discipline sections below, medalists' names are bolded.

Medal	Name	Sport	Event	Date
Gold	Akeem Stewart	Athletics	Men's Discus Throw F44	August 13
Gold	Akeem Stewart	Athletics	Men's Javelin Throw F44	August 14

**Medals by sport**
**Sport**	1st place, gold medalist(s)	2nd place, silver medalist(s)	3rd place, bronze medalist(s)	**Total**
Athletics	2	0	0	2
**Total**	**2**	**0**	**0**	**2**

**Medals by day**
**Day**	1st place, gold medalist(s)	2nd place, silver medalist(s)	3rd place, bronze medalist(s)	**Total**
August 13	1	0	0	1
August 14	1	0	0	1
**Total**	**2**	**0**	**0**	**2**

== Athletics ==
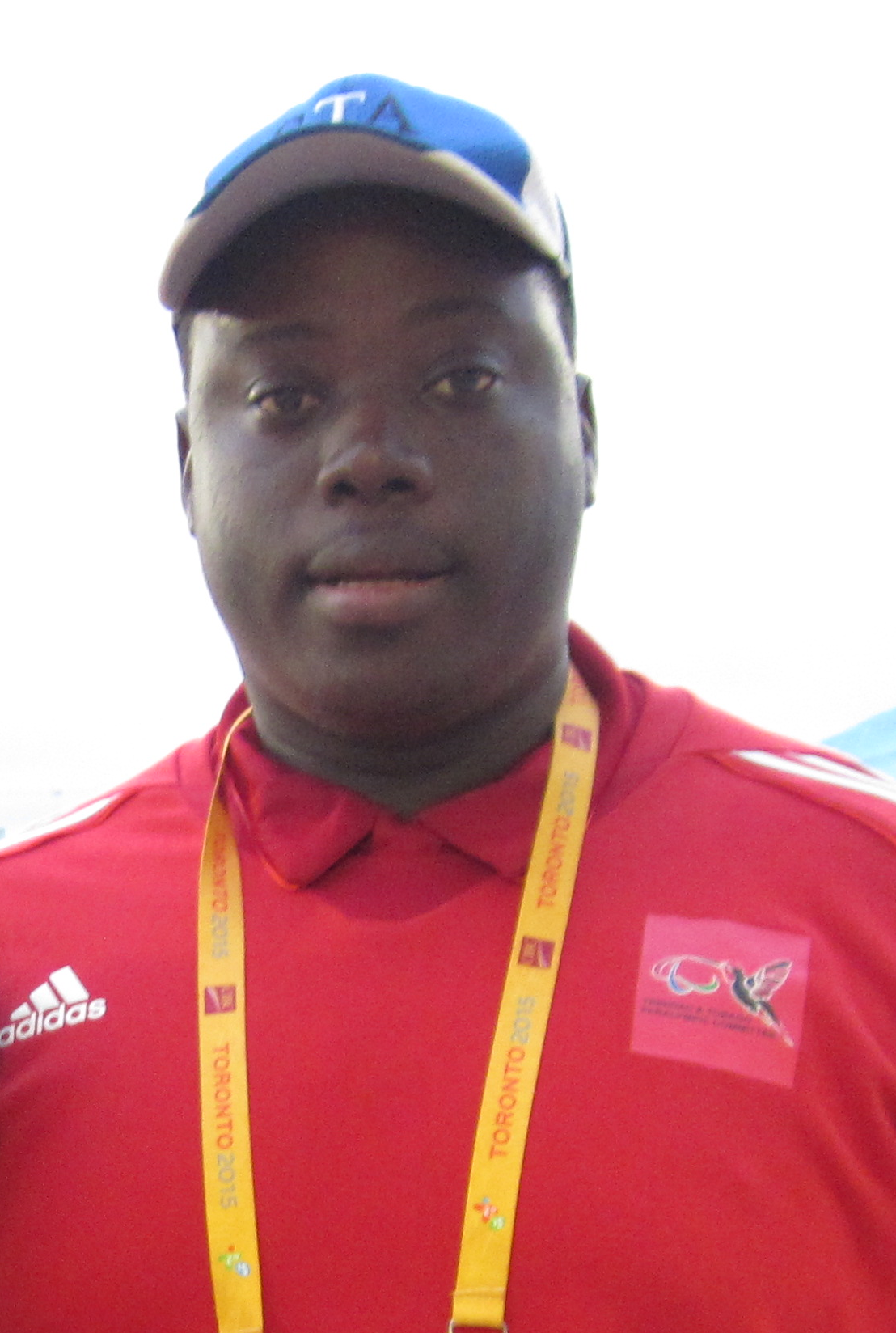
Akeem Stewart, gold medalist and world record holder in Men's Discus Throw and Javelin Throw F43 category

Men

Athlete	Event	#1	#2	#3	#4	#5	#6	Result	Rank
Carlos Grenne	Men's Shot Put F11/12	10.47	10.41	10.06	**10.58**	9.92	10.39	**63.03**	4
**Akeem Stewart**	Men's Discus Throw F44	60.36	X	X	X	-	**63.03**	**63.03** **WR**	1st place, gold medalist(s)
**Akeem Stewart**	Men's Javelin Throw F44	48.74	52.72	**53.36**	53.06	X	52.56	**53.36** **WR**	1st place, gold medalist(s)

== Swimming ==
Women

Athlete	Event	Heat		Final	
Athlete	Event	Time	Rank	Time	Rank
Shanntol Ince	Women's 50 m Freestyle S9	33.71 **Q**	3	33.36	6
Shanntol Ince	Women's 100 m Butterfly S10(S8-10	1:20.02 **Q**	4	1:19.11	8
Shanntol Ince	Women's 100 m Freestyle S9	—N/a		1:12.54	6
Shanntol Ince	Women's 400 m Freestyle S9	—N/a		5:28.81	7

== Table tennis ==
Athlete	Event	Preliminary Round		Quarterfinals	Semifinals	Final	
Athlete	Event	Opposition Score	Opposition Score	Opposition Score	Opposition Score	Opposition Score	Rank
Dennis La Rose	Men's Singles Class 5	Daniel Rodriguez (ARG); **L** (0-3)	Stuart Caplin (USA); **W** (3-2)	Elias Romero (ESA); **L** (1-3)	did not advance		5
