= Akeem Stewart =

Trinidad and Tobago Paralympic athlete

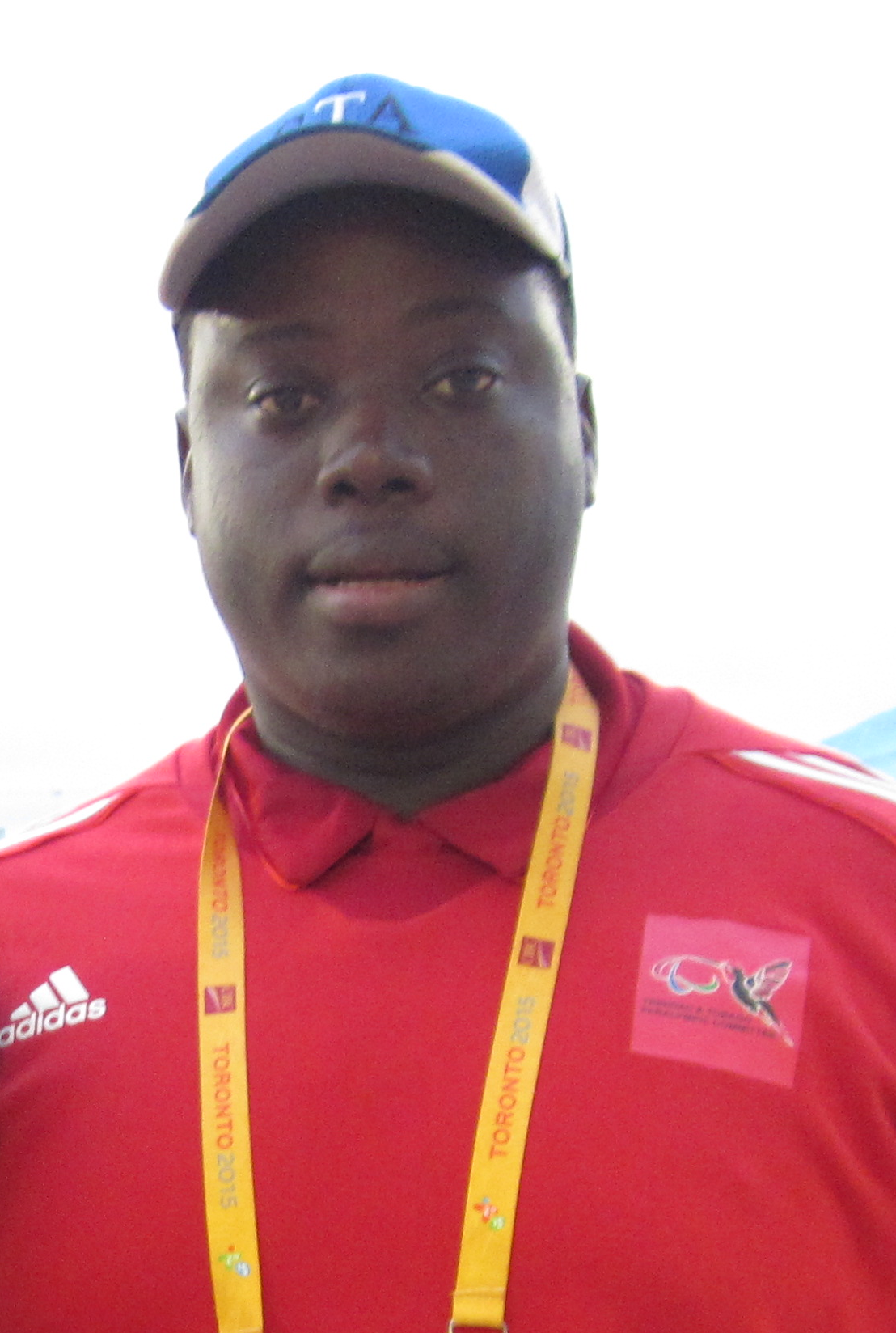
- Akeem Stewart (2015)

Personal information
- Full name: Wimana Akeem Stewart
- Born: 4 July 1992 (age 33)

Sport
- Country: Trinidad and Tobago
- Sport: Track and field
- Disability: Leg length difference
- Disability class: F43
- Events: Discus throw; Javelin throw; Shot put
Medal record
Paralympic Games
Gold medal – first place	2016 Rio de Janeiro	Javelin throw F44
Silver medal – second place	2016 Rio de Janeiro	Discus throw F44
Silver medal – second place	2024 Paris	Discus throw F64
World Championships
Gold medal – first place	2017 London	Javelin throw F44
Gold medal – first place	2017 London	Shot put F44
Silver medal – second place	2025 New Delhi	Discus throw F44
Bronze medal – third place	2015 Doha	Discus throw F44
Parapan American Games
Gold medal – first place	2015 Toronto	Discus throw F44
Gold medal – first place	2015 Toronto	Javelin throw F44
Gold medal – first place	2019 Lima	Discus throw F64
Silver medal – second place	2019 Lima	Javelin throw F64

Akeem Stewart (born 4 July 1992) is a Trinidad and Tobago Paralympic athlete with F43 disability classification. He competes in discus throw, javelin throw and shot put events.

Stewart represented Trinidad and Tobago at the 2016 Summer Paralympics in Rio de Janeiro, Brazil where he won the gold medal in the men's javelin throw F44 event and the silver medal in the men's discus throw F44 event.

== Career ==
In 2011, Stewart competed at the CARIFTA Games held in Montego Bay, Jamaica where he won two medals in the junior under-20 events: the silver medal in the discus throw event and the bronze medal in the shot put event. He competed at the 2013 Central American and Caribbean Championships in Athletics held in Morelia, Mexico where he finished in 4th place in the shot put event.

In 2014, Stewart finished in 4th place in the shot put event at the 2014 Central American and Caribbean Games held in Veracruz, Mexico. In this year, he also competed in the 2014 NACAC U23 Championships in Athletics where he won the bronze medal in the shot put event. The following year, Stewart represented Trinidad and Tobago at the 2015 Parapan American Games and he won two gold medals: in the men's discus throw F44 event and in the men's javelin throw F44 event. In the same year, he also competed in the 2015 World Championships and he won the bronze medal in the men's discus throw F44 event.

In 2017, Stewart competed in the 2017 World Championships winning the gold medal in both the shot put F44 and javelin throw F44 events. He also set a new world record in both events. In 2018, he represented Trinidad and Tobago at the 2018 Commonwealth Games held in Gold Coast, Australia and he did not win a medal on this occasion. He competed in the men's shot put event where he finished in 9th place in the final.

In 2019, he won the gold medal in the men's discus throw F64 event at the 2019 Parapan American Games held in Lima, Peru. He also set a new world record of 63.70m, He also won the silver medal in the men's javelin throw F64 event. He pulled out of the 2020 Summer Paralympics competition, citing insufficient preparation.

He competed in discus throw F64 at the 2024 Summer Paralympics in Paris, France, winning a silver medal.

== Achievements ==
Year	Competition	Venue	Position	Event	Notes
Representing Trinidad and Tobago
2015	Parapan American Games	Toronto, Canada	1st	Discus throw	63.03
2015	Parapan American Games	Toronto, Canada	1st	Javelin throw	53.36
2015	World Championships	Doha, Qatar	3rd	Discus throw	59.13
2016	Summer Paralympics	Rio de Janeiro, Brazil	1st	Javelin throw	57.32
2016	Summer Paralympics	Rio de Janeiro, Brazil	2nd	Discus throw	61.72
2017	World Championships	London, United Kingdom	1st	Javelin throw	57.61
2017	World Championships	London, United Kingdom	1st	Shot put	19.08
2019	Parapan American Games	Lima, Peru	1st	Discus throw	63.70
2019	Parapan American Games	Lima, Peru	2nd	Javelin throw	55.24
2024	Summer Paralympics	Paris, France	2nd	Discus throw	59.66
