= Luis Arturo Paiva =

Venezuelan athlete

Personal information
- Full name: Luis Arturo Paiva Renfigo
- Born: 22 September 1987 (age 39) Caracas, Venezuela
- Height: 1.90 m (6 ft 3 in)

Sport
- Country: Venezuela
- Sport: Paralympic athletics
- Disability class: T20
- Events: 400 metres 800 metres 1500 metres
Medal record
Paralympic athletics
Representing Venezuela
Paralympic Games
Silver medal – second place	2016 Rio de Janeiro	400m T20
World Championships
Silver medal – second place	2015 Doha	800m T20
Parapan American Games
Gold medal – first place	2015 Toronto	400m T20
Silver medal – second place	2015 Toronto	1500m T20

Luis Arturo Paiva Renfigo (born 22 September 1987) is a Venezuelan Paralympic athlete who competes in international elite competitions in sprinting and middle-distance running events. He is a Parapan American Games champion and is also a Paralympic and World silver medalist.
