= Ettiam Calderón =

Cuban Paralympic athlete (born 1984)

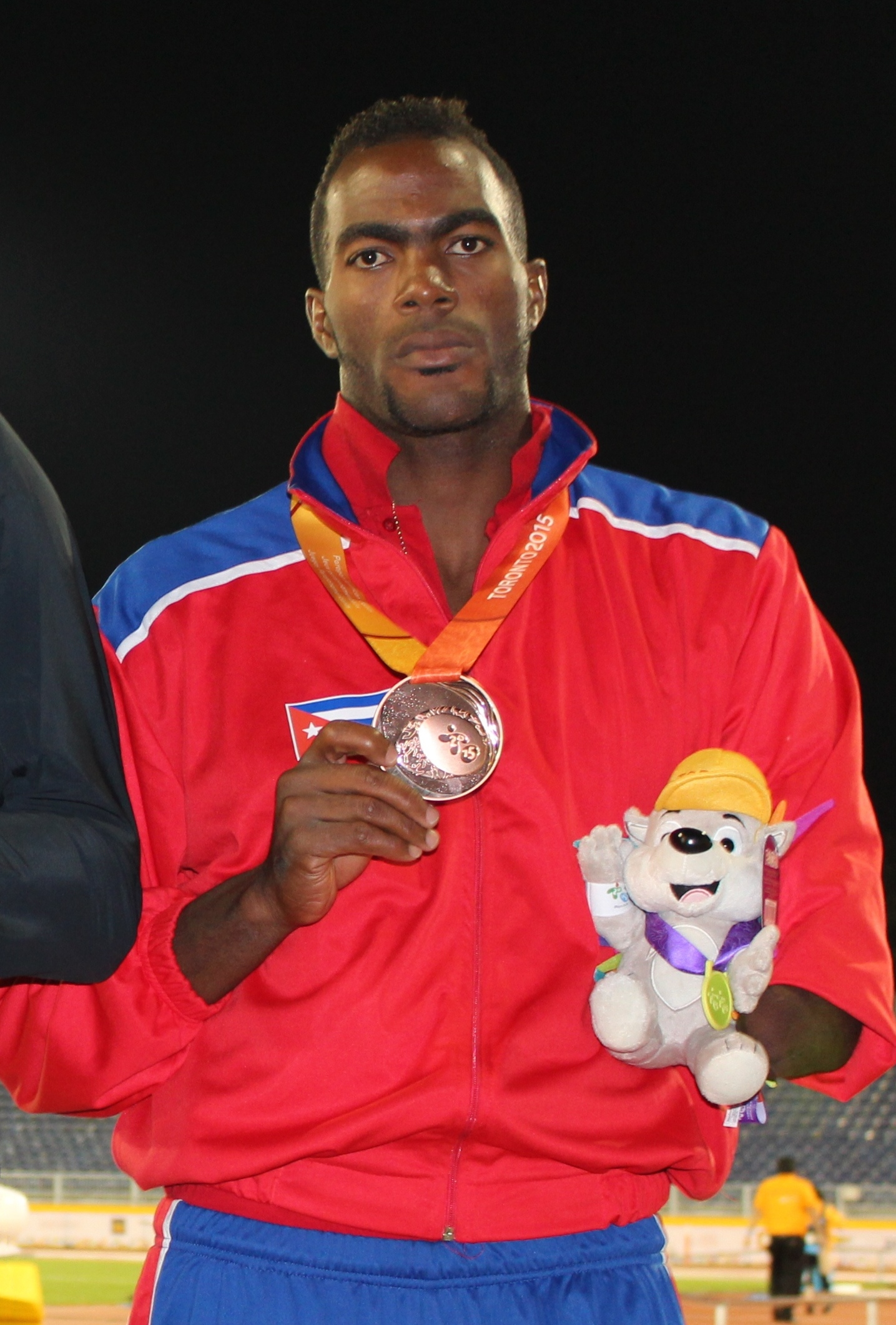
- Calderón at the 2015 Parapan American Games

Personal information
- Born: October 24, 1984 (age 42)

Sport
- Sport: Paralympic athletics
- Disability class: T46/47/F46/47
- Events: Sprint, long jump

Achievements and titles
- Personal bests: 200 m – 22.54 (2011); LJ – 6.81 m (2011)
Medal record
Representing Cuba
Paralympic Games
Bronze medal – third place	2008 Beijing	200 m T46
IPC World Championships
Silver medal – second place	2013 Lyon	400 m T46
Parapan American Games
Gold medal – first place	2011 Guadalajara	Long jump F46
Silver medal – second place	2011 Guadalajara	200 m T46
Bronze medal – third place	2007 Rio de Janeiro	100 m T46
Bronze medal – third place	2015 Toronto	Long jump F47
Bronze medal – third place	2015 Toronto	400 m T47

Ettiam Calderón Lastres (born October 24, 1984) is a Paralympic T46/47/F46/47 track and field athlete from Cuba. He competed in sprint and long jump events at the 2008, 2012 and 2016 Olympics and won a bronze medal in the 200 m sprint in 2008, finishing fourth in the long jump. Calderón has no left arm below the elbow.
