= Charles Davis (American athlete) =

American visually impaired runner

Personal information
- Nickname: Chaz
- Born: 21 September 1993 (age 32) Grafton, Massachusetts
- Home town: Worcester, Massachusetts
- Education: University of Hartford
- Height: 5 ft 8 in (173 cm)
- Weight: 145 lb (66 kg)

Sport
- Country: United States
- Sport: Paralympic athletics
- Disability: Leber's optic neuropathy
- Disability class: T13
Medal record
Paralympic athletics
Representing United States
Parapan American Games
Silver medal – second place	2015 Toronto	5000m T12

Charles "Chaz" Davis (born September 21, 1993) is an American visually impaired runner from Grafton, Massachusetts. His debut as a marathon competitor occurred December 3, 2016 at the California International Marathon (CIM). With a finish time of 2:31:48, Davis set a new American record for the T12/B2 visual impairment category. Chaz's CIM finish time was 29 seconds faster than the 2:32:17 finish of Paralympian gold medalist El Amin Chentouf at the 2016 Paralympic Games in Rio

The 2016 Rio games marked another first for Davis. As a member of Team USA's track and field contingency, he finished 8th in the 5000m and 10th in the 1500m. CIM prides itself as a starting block for would be marathon runners. The CIM website notes that it is a qualifier event for the oldest continuously running Boston Marathon and US Olympic Trials Marathon. In yet another personal best, Davis ran the 122nd Boston Marathon on Monday April 16, 2018. Although he broke no records, Boston.com lists Chaz 5th among its 15 notable 2018 Boston Marathon finishers. His official end time was 2:56:22.

Davis began his career as a teen racing for Grafton High School in MA. Determined to excel, he entered the University of Hartford and accepted a position on its cross country team. Shortly after completing his inaugural running season, Davis was diagnosed with Leber's Hereditary Optic Neuropathy (LHON). This rare disease destroys the optic nerve in the eye typically resulting in sudden vision loss which was the case for Chaz. Despite his legally blind classification, Chaz continues to make lemonade with his lemons.

Davis currently works at the Massachusetts Association for the Blind & Visually Impaired, a division of MAB Community services in the Greater Boston area. As the coordinator of Team With A Vision's para-athletics division and adaptive programs, Davis is responsible for leading the team of athletes. As he has a master's degree in social work Davis will also work in the adjustment to vision loss counseling department.
