= Buffalo, Illinois =

Village of Buffalo
- Village
- Motto: Where Families Matter
- Location of Buffalo in Sangamon County, Illinois.
- Coordinates: 39°51′00″N 89°24′33″W
- Country: United States
- State: Illinois
- County: Sangamon
- Founded: 1854

Government
  - Type: Mayor-Trustee

Area
  - Total: 0.34 sq mi (0.89 km^{2})
  - Land: 0.34 sq mi (0.89 km^{2})
  - Water: 0 sq mi (0.00 km^{2})
- Elevation: 610 ft (190 m)

Population (2020)
  - Total: 447
  - Density: 1,295.9/sq mi (500.35/km^{2})
- Time zone: UTC-6 (CST)
  - Summer (DST): UTC-5 (CDT)
- Zip code: 62515
- FIPS code: 17-09434
- GNIS feature ID: 2397489

Buffalo is a village in Mechanicsburg Township in Sangamon County, Illinois, United States. As of the 2020 census, Buffalo had a population of 447. It is part of the Springfield, Illinois Metropolitan Statistical Area.

== Geography ==
According to the 2010 census, Buffalo has a total area of 0.37 square miles (0.96 km^{2}), all land.

== Demographics ==
Historical population
Census	Pop.	Note	%±
1870	263		—
1880	338		28.5%
1900	531		—
1910	475		−10.5%
1920	475		0.0%
1930	411		−13.5%
1940	422		2.7%
1950	416		−1.4%
1960	356		−14.4%
1970	462		29.8%
1980	514		11.3%
1990	503		−2.1%
2000	491		−2.4%
2010	503		2.4%
2020	447		−11.1%
U.S. Decennial Census

As of the census of 2000, there were 491 people, 199 households, and 135 families residing in the village. The population density was 1,332.2 inhabitants per square mile (514.4/km^{2}). There were 208 housing units at an average density of 564.4 per square mile (217.9/km^{2}). The racial makeup of the village was 97.56% White, 0.61% Native American, 0.20% Asian, 0.20% from other races, and 1.43% from two or more races. Hispanic or Latino of any race were 1.22% of the population.

There were 199 households, out of which 34.2% had children under the age of 18 living with them, 50.8% were married couples living together, 13.1% had a female householder with no husband present, and 31.7% were non-families. 29.1% of all households were made up of individuals, and 17.1% had someone living alone who was 65 years of age or older. The average household size was 2.47 and the average family size was 3.04.

In the village, the population was spread out, with 27.7% under the age of 18, 8.6% from 18 to 24, 26.9% from 25 to 44, 23.4% from 45 to 64, and 13.4% who were 65 years of age or older. The median age was 36 years. For every 100 females, there were 96.4 males. For every 100 females age 18 and over, there were 90.9 males.

The median income for a household in the village was $36,250, and the median income for a family was $51,250. Males had a median income of $31,641 versus $25,486 for females. The per capita income for the village was $19,637. About 8.7% of families and 10.8% of the population were below the poverty line, including 16.3% of those under age 18 and 10.4% of those age 65 or over.

== Schools ==
- Tri-City Community Unit School District 1

== Library ==
- Tri-City Public Library District
