= Jamaica at the 2015 Parapan American Games =

- IOC code: JAM
- NOC: Jamaica Paralympic Association
- Website: http://jamaicaparalympic.com/

in Toronto 7–15 August 2015
- Competitors: 6 in 1 sport
- Medals Ranked 10th: Gold 2 Silver 2 Bronze 1 Total 5

Parapan American Games appearances
- 1999; 2003; 2007; 2011; 2015; 2019; 2023

Jamaica competed in the 2015 Parapan American Games.

== Competitors ==
The following table lists Jamaica's delegation per sport and gender.

Sport	Men	Women	Total
Athletics	5	1	6
Total	5	1	6

== Medalists ==
The following competitors from Jamaica won medals at the games. In the by discipline sections below, medalists' names are bolded.

Medal	Name	Sport	Event	Date
Gold	Alphonso Cunningham	Athletics	Men's Discus Throw F51/52/53/57	August 10
Gold	Tanto Campbell	Athletics	Men's Javelin Throw F56	August 13
Silver	Shane Hudson	Athletics	Men's 400m T47	August 12
Silver	Tanto Campbell	Athletics	Men's Discus Throw F54/55/56	August 11
Bronze	Alphonso Cunningham	Athletics	Men's Javelin Throw F53/54/55	August 12

**Medals by sport**
**Sport**	1st place, gold medalist(s)	2nd place, silver medalist(s)	3rd place, bronze medalist(s)	**Total**
Athletics	2	2	1	5
**Total**	**2**	**2**	**1**	**5**

**Medals by day**
**Day**	1st place, gold medalist(s)	2nd place, silver medalist(s)	3rd place, bronze medalist(s)	**Total**
August 10	1	0	0	1
August 11	0	1	0	1
August 12	0	1	1	2
August 13	1	0	0	1
**Total**	**2**	**2**	**1**	**5**

== Athletics ==
Men
Track

Athlete	Event	Semifinal		Final	
Athlete	Event	Time	Rank	Time	Rank
Tevaughn Thomas	Men's 100m T47	12.00 **PB**	6	Did not advance	
David Bascoe	Men's 200m T47	23.76 **q**	4	DSQ	
David Bascoe	Men's 400m T47	—N/a		51.08	6
**Shane Hudson**	Men's 200m T47	22.81 **q**	4	22.90	6
**Shane Hudson**	Men's 400m T47	—N/a		49.97	2nd place, silver medalist(s)

Field

Athlete	Event	Final		
Athlete	Event	Distance	Result points	Rank
**Alphanso Cunningham**	Men's Discus Throw F51/52/53/57	24.80 **SB**	959	1st place, gold medalist(s)
**Alphanso Cunningham**	Men's Javelin Throw F53/54/55	19.49	837	3rd place, bronze medalist(s)
**Tanto Campbell**	Men's Discus Throw F54/55/56	37.62	876	2nd place, silver medalist(s)
**Tanto Campbell**	Men's Javelin Throw F56	29.81	—N/a	1st place, gold medalist(s)

Women
Field

Athlete	Event	Final		
Athlete	Event	Distance	Result points	Rank
Sylvia Grant	Women's Discus Throw F56/57	22.55 **SB**	579	5
Sylvia Grant	Women's Javelin Throw F57	16.00	—N/a	5
Sylvia Grant	Women's Shot Put F56/57	6.24	278	7
