= Karen Van Nest =

Canadian Paralympic archer

Personal information
- Nationality: Canadian
- Born: 29 September 1962 (age 63) North Bay, Ontario, Canada

Sport
- Sport: Para Archery; Paralympic shooting
- Event: Compound
- Coached by: Phil Henderson
Medal record
Para Archery
Representing Canada
Parapan American Games
Silver medal – second place	2015 Toronto	Women's compound

Karen Van Nest (born 29 September 1962) is a Canadian Paralympic archer and shooter. She is a Parapan American Games medalist and has competed in six Paralympic Games.

== Early life ==
Van Nest is originally from North Bay, Ontario. At age 23, she lost her left leg in a motorcycle accident.

== Career ==
Van Nest began shooting in 1996. She qualified for Canada’s Paralympic team in 1998, placing fourth at the 2000 Paralympics. She finished fifth at the 2004 Paralympics and tenth at the 2008 Paralympics. In 2006, she won a bronze medal at the world championships in rowing.

Van Nest began para archery in 2008, at the age of 46. She switched from shooting to archery after she experienced problems with her right shoulder, and made her Paralympic archery debut at the 2012 Summer Paralympics. At the 2014 Pan Am Championships she won bronze in the women's compound open and silver in mixed team. She won silver at the 2015 Parapan American Games in women’s compound open, losing by eight points to Jane Karla Gögel of Brazil. At the 2016 Summer Paralympics, Van Nest came fourth in the women's compound open. Van Nest won gold in the women’s compound open at the 2017 Para Pan American Championships and bronze in the same event at the Championships the following year. She competed in archery at the Tokyo 2020 Paralympic Games.
