= Kevin Evans (archer) =

Canadian Paralympic archer (born 1962)

Personal information
- Born: 28 September 1962 (age 63) Calgary, Alberta, Canada

Sport
- Sport: Archery
- Event: Compound
Medal record
Representing Canada
Parapan American Games
Gold medal – first place	2011 Guadalajara	Men's compound

Kevin Evans (born 28 September 1962) is a Canadian Paralympic archer.

He has competed three times at the Summer Paralympics, four times at the World Para Archery Championships, four times at the Continental Championships, and twice at the Para Continental Championships.

== Biography ==
Evans started archery in 1979 and made his international debut in 2004. A gold medallist at the 2011 Parapan American Games and two-time world champion, Evans is one of the world's top Paralympic archers. He lost his left arm in 2000 in a seismic-rig accident in Alberta's Peace River region.
