= Luciano Rezende (archer) =

Brazilian Paralympic archer (born 1978)

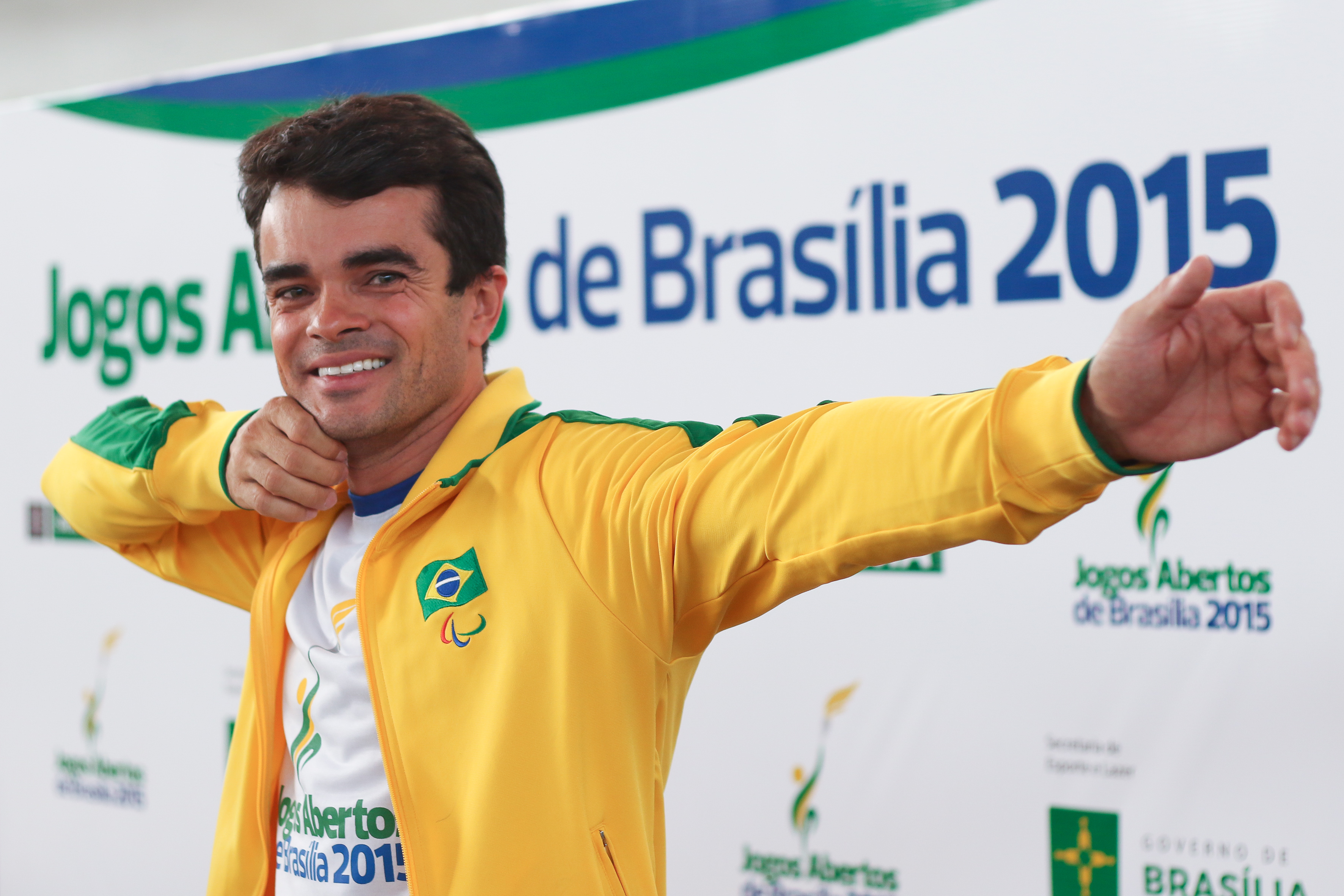

Personal information
- Full name: Luciano Reinaldo Rezende
- Nationality: Brazilian
- Born: 5 August 1978 (age 47) Brasília, Brazil

Sport
- Sport: Archery
- Event: Recurve
- Coached by: Christian Haensell
Medal record
Representing Brazil
Parapan American Games
Gold medal – first place	2015 Toronto	Men's recurve

Luciano Reinaldo Rezende (born 5 August 1978) is a Brazilian Paralympic archer and Parapan American Games gold medalist.

He has competed once at the Summer Paralympics, three times at the World Para Archery Championships and once at the Para Continental Championships. In the 2016 Summer Paralympics he finished fourth in the men's recurve, being beaten to a bronze medal by Ebrahim Ranjbarkivaj.
