= Paul Nitz =

American Paralympic athlete

Personal information
- Born: 1969 (age 56–57) Edina, Minnesota, United States

Sport
- Sport: Paralympic athletics
Medal record
Representing United States
Paralympic Games
Gold medal – first place	1992 Barcelona	4 × 100 m TW1–2
Gold medal – first place	1992 Barcelona	100 m TW2
Gold medal – first place	1996 Atlanta	100 m T51
Gold medal – first place	2000 Sydney	100 m T52
Bronze medal – third place	2012 London	100 m T52
IPC World Championships
Bronze medal – third place	1998 Birmingham	100m T53
Bronze medal – third place	2011 Christchurch	100 m T52
Parapan American Games
Bronze medal – third place	2015 Toronto	100m T52

Paul Nitz (born 1969) is a Paralympic athlete from the United States competing mainly in category T52 sprint events.

== Biography ==
Paul has competed in five Paralympics, winning four gold medals and one bronze. His first games came in 1992, where he was part of the American TW1-2 4 × 100 m relay team that set a new world record on the way to winning the gold medal, winning the individual 100m in a new Paralympic record as well as competing in the 200m and 400m. In his home games in 1996, he again competed in the 100m, 200m and 400m, setting a new world record in the 100m to win his second gold medal at the distance. A third 100m gold came in 2000 Summer Paralympics, where he also finished sixth in the 200m. His fourth games in 2004 Summer Paralympics were the first time Paul had been beaten in a Paralympic 100m final, only managing a sixth. He also failed to make the final in both the 200m and 400m.

After missing out on making the 2008 Beijing Paralympics, Paul came back in 2012 with sights on more medals and records. At the Swiss Championships in May 2012, he broke the world record twice in two separate competitions. His best time was 16.73 seconds. He finished the 2012 season with a bronze medal.
