= Matt Stutzman =

American Paralympic archer

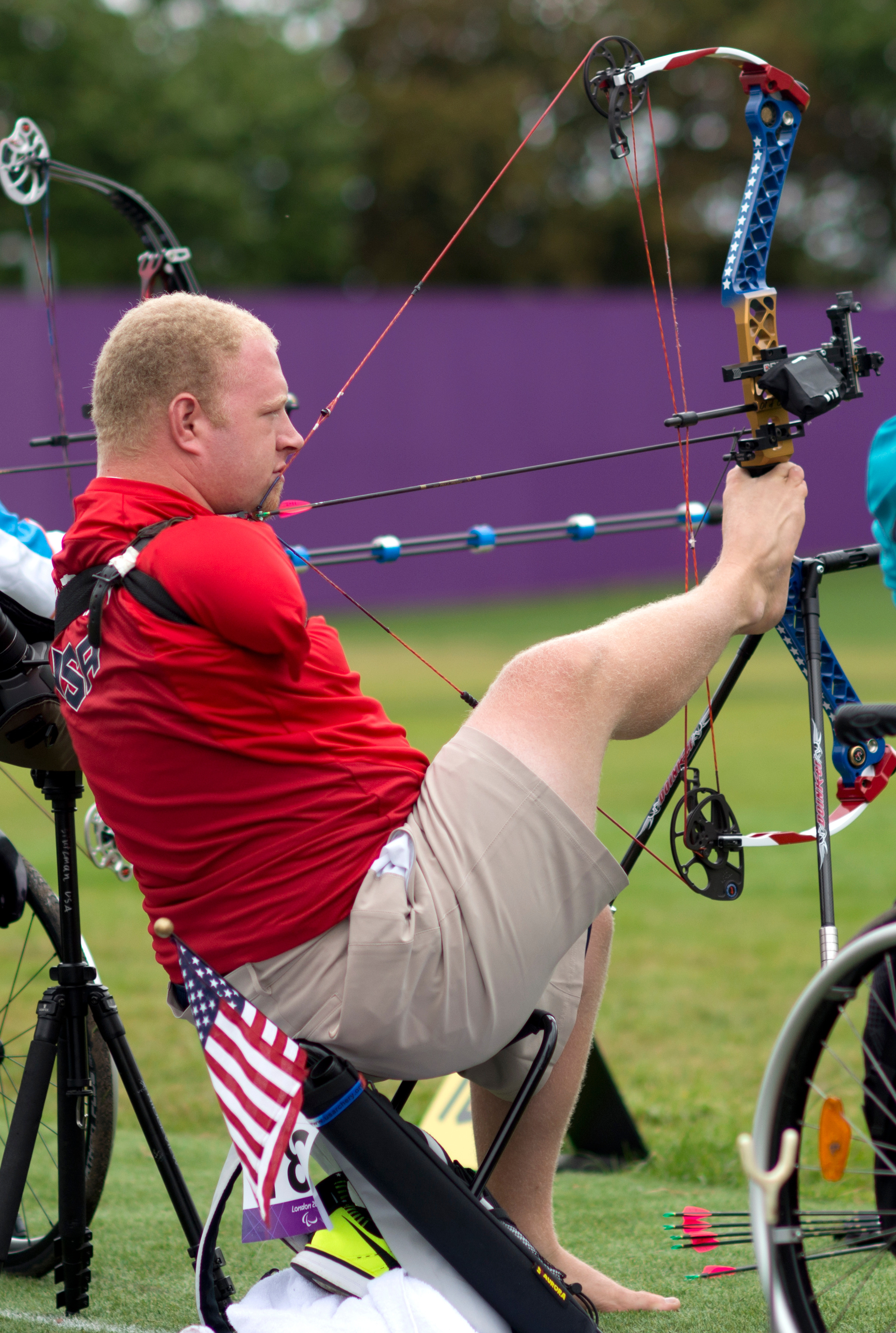
- Stutzman at the 2012 Summer Paralympics

Personal information
- Full name: Matthew Stutzman
- Born: December 10, 1982 (age 43) Kansas City, Kansas, U.S.
- Website: mattstutzman.com

Sport
- Country: United States
- Sport: Para-archery
- Event: Compound open
- Coached by: Randi Smith
Medal record
Para-archery
Representing United States
Paralympic Games
Gold medal – first place	2024 Paris	Individual compound
Silver medal – second place	2012 London	Individual compound
World Para Archery Championship
Gold medal – first place	2022 Dubai	Compound Men Open
Parapan American Games
Silver medal – second place	2015 Toronto	Individual compound

Matthew Stutzman (born December 10, 1982) is an American archer. He competed at the Paralympics in 2012, 2016, 2020, and 2024, winning a silver medal in London in 2012 and a gold medal in Paris in 2024. Born without arms, Stutzman uses his legs and feet for most of his activities, including archery.

== Early life ==
Stutzman was born in Kansas City, Kansas. His birth parents put him up for adoption at 4 months old, and at 13 months old, he was adopted by Leon and Jean Stutzman. He grew up in Iowa with seven siblings and was raised in the Mennonite faith.

Stutzman was born without arms, although there is no underlying condition known to have caused this.

== Career ==
Stutzman began practicing archery at 28 years old in 2010. In 2015, he broke the world record for the furthest accurate distance shot, which had been previously held by an able-bodied archer.

Stutzman's first Paralympic competition was in the 2012 Summer Paralympics, where he won silver. Stutzman has won multiple medals in various years at the World Para Archery Championship. Stutzman is featured in the 2020 documentary film Rising Phoenix.

Stutzman went on to compete in the 2024 Summer Paralympics, defeating Ai Xinliang in a shoot-off and winning gold. He mentored Sheetal Devi, who also competed in the 2024 Summer Paralympics. Stutzman stated that the 2024 Summer Paralympics may be his final Paralympic competition due to hip issues.

== Drag racing ==
Stutzman developed an interest in motorsports in his youth when he took apart and rebuilt his father's motorcycle. While he aspired to race professionally, he opted to focus on archery first due to racing's high costs. He made his amateur drag racing debut in 2012, competing in Sportsman races at Eddyville Raceway Park with his 1968 Chevrolet Camaro.

Once his archery career started to wind down, Stutzman began pursuing drag racing more seriously. In 2025, Stutzman made his National Hot Rod Association debut in the West Central Division at Brainerd, where he achieved his longtime goal of reaching 200 miles per hour (320 km/h) when he went 214.69 mph (345.51 km/h). He entered the NHRA U.S. Nationals in August.

When racing, Stutzman accelerates and steers using his feet: his right foot holds the steering wheel while his left is on the gas and brake pedals. His toes are used to hold the line lock, activate the transbrake, and trigger the parachutes. The car's steering column is shortened so that the wheel is closer to the pedals, and he also has a custom lever to quickly remove his seat belts.

== Personal life ==
Stutzman lives in Fairfield, Iowa. He is married and has three sons.

== Filmography ==
Film roles
Year	Title	Role	Notes	Refs.
2013	My Way to Olympia	Himself	Documentary	
2020	Rising Phoenix	Himself	Documentary	
