= Gianfranco Iannotta =

American Paralympic athlete (born 1994)

Personal information
- Born: January 24, 1994 (age 32) Jersey City, New Jersey, U.S.

Sport
- Team: New Jersey Navigators
- Coached by: Jimmy Cuevas
Medal record
Track and field
Representing United States
Paralympic Games
Gold medal – first place	2016 Rio de Janeiro	100m T52
Bronze medal – third place	2016 Rio de Janeiro	400m T52
World Championships
Silver medal – second place	2013 Lyon	200m T52
Silver medal – second place	2019 Dubai	100m T52
Bronze medal – third place	2013 Lyon	100m T52
Bronze medal – third place	2017 London	100m T52
Parapan American Games
Gold medal – first place	2015 Toronto	200m T52
Gold medal – first place	2019 Lima	100m T52
Silver medal – second place	2015 Toronto	100m T52
Bronze medal – third place	2011 Guadalajara	100m T52
Bronze medal – third place	2011 Guadalajara	200m T52
Bronze medal – third place	2019 Lima	400m T52

Gianfranco Iannotta (born January 24, 1994) is an American track and field athlete.

== Early life and education ==
Iannotta was born to parents Franco and Luz Iannotta on January 24, 1994. He was born with spina bifida and was paralyzed from the waist down upon birth. Iannotta graduated from Garfield High School in 2012.

== Career ==
Iannotta made his national debut with Team USA at the 2011 Parapan American Games. As a result of his success, he was invited to the qualifying rounds for the 2012 Summer Paralympics but failed to qualify for the final roster to London.

After his high school graduation, Iannotta was selected to compete with Team USA at the 2013 IPC Athletics World Championships. He won a bronze medal in the 100 meter race, and a silver medal in the 200m.

Three years later, Iannotta made his Paralympic Games debut during the 2016 Summer Paralympics. He earned Team USA's first 2016 Paralympic gold medal in track with a time of 17.17 seconds, beating the previous medalist Raymond Martin. Iannotta ended the Games with a bronze medal in the 400-meter race. The following year, he was named to Team USAs roster for the 2017 World Para Athletics Championships, where he won a bronze medal in the men's T52 100.

Iannotta later took home a gold medal in the men's 100m T52 wheelchair event at the 2019 World Para Athletics Grand Prix with a time of 17.19. Due to his success, Iannotta was selected to compete with Team USA at the 2019 World Para Athletics Championships. At these championships he won the silver medal in the men's 100 metres T52 event and he qualified to represent the United States at the 2020 Summer Paralympics.
