= Shaquille Vance =

American Paralympic sprinter

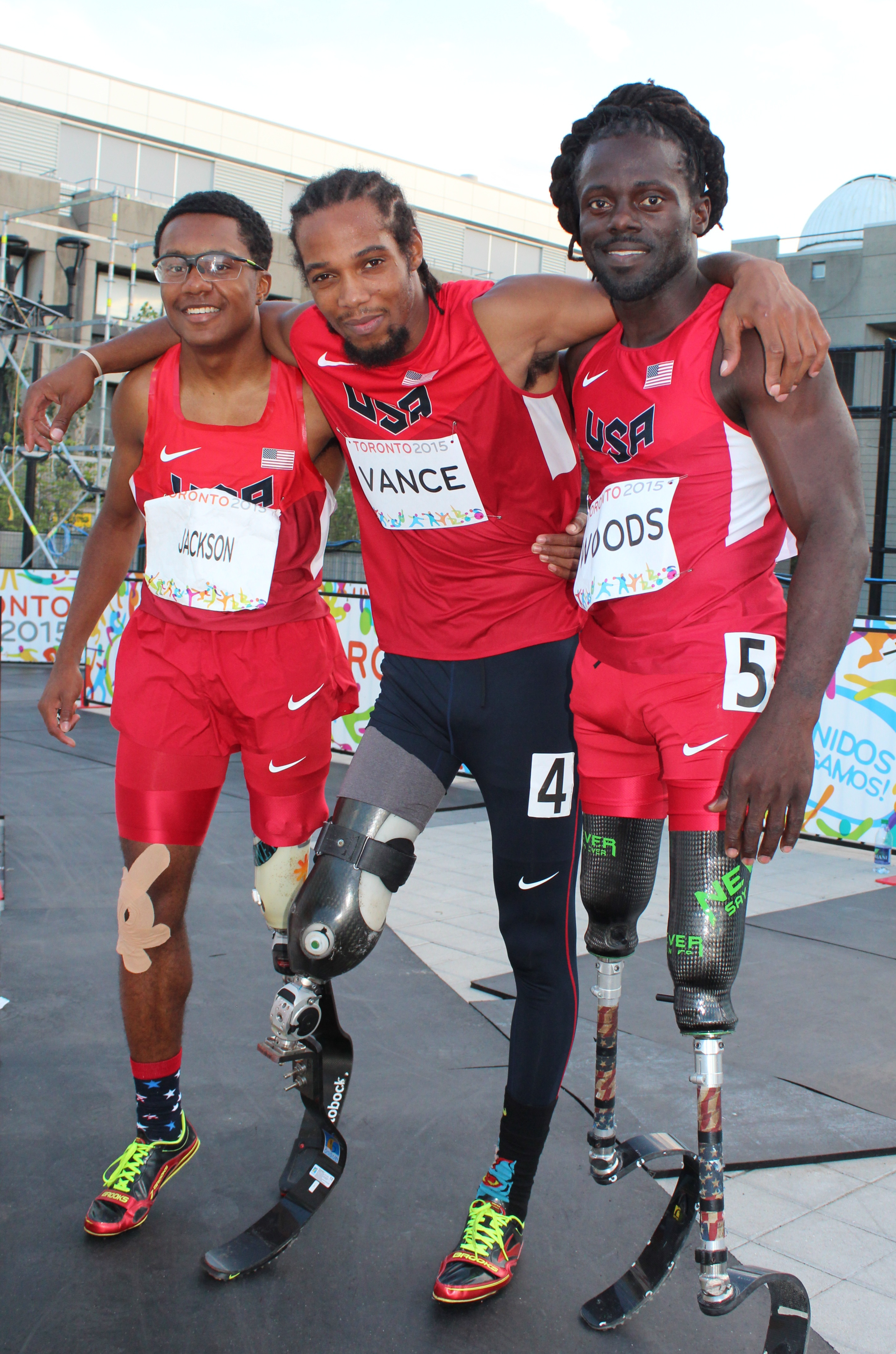
- Vance (center) at the 2015 Parapan American Games

Personal information
- Born: March 22, 1991 (age 35) Amory, Mississippi, U.S.
- Height: 6 ft 2 in (1.88 m)
- Weight: 186 lb (84 kg)

Sport
- Sport: Paralympic athletics
- Disability class: T42
- Event(s): Sprint, shot put
- Coached by: Joaquim Cruz
Medal record
Representing the United States
Paralympic Games
Silver medal – second place	2012 London	200 m T42
Parapan American Games
Gold medal – first place	2011 Guadalajara	100 m T42
Gold medal – first place	2015 Toronto	100 m T42

Shaquille Vance (born March 22, 1991) is an American T42 Paralympic sprint runner and shot putter. Vance lost his leg in an American football accident in 2009. Two weeks after surgery to repair the damaged leg, no blood was circulating to his foot so his leg was removed. Before losing his leg, he was a linebacker and wide receiver for the Houston Hilltoppers.

At the 2012 Paralympic Games, Vance won a silver medal in the 200 m event in a time of 25.55 seconds, setting a new American record. He also placed sixth in the shot put and eighth in the 100 m. He won the 100 m event at the 2011 and 2015 Parapan American Games.
