= Andre Shelby =

American Paralympic archer

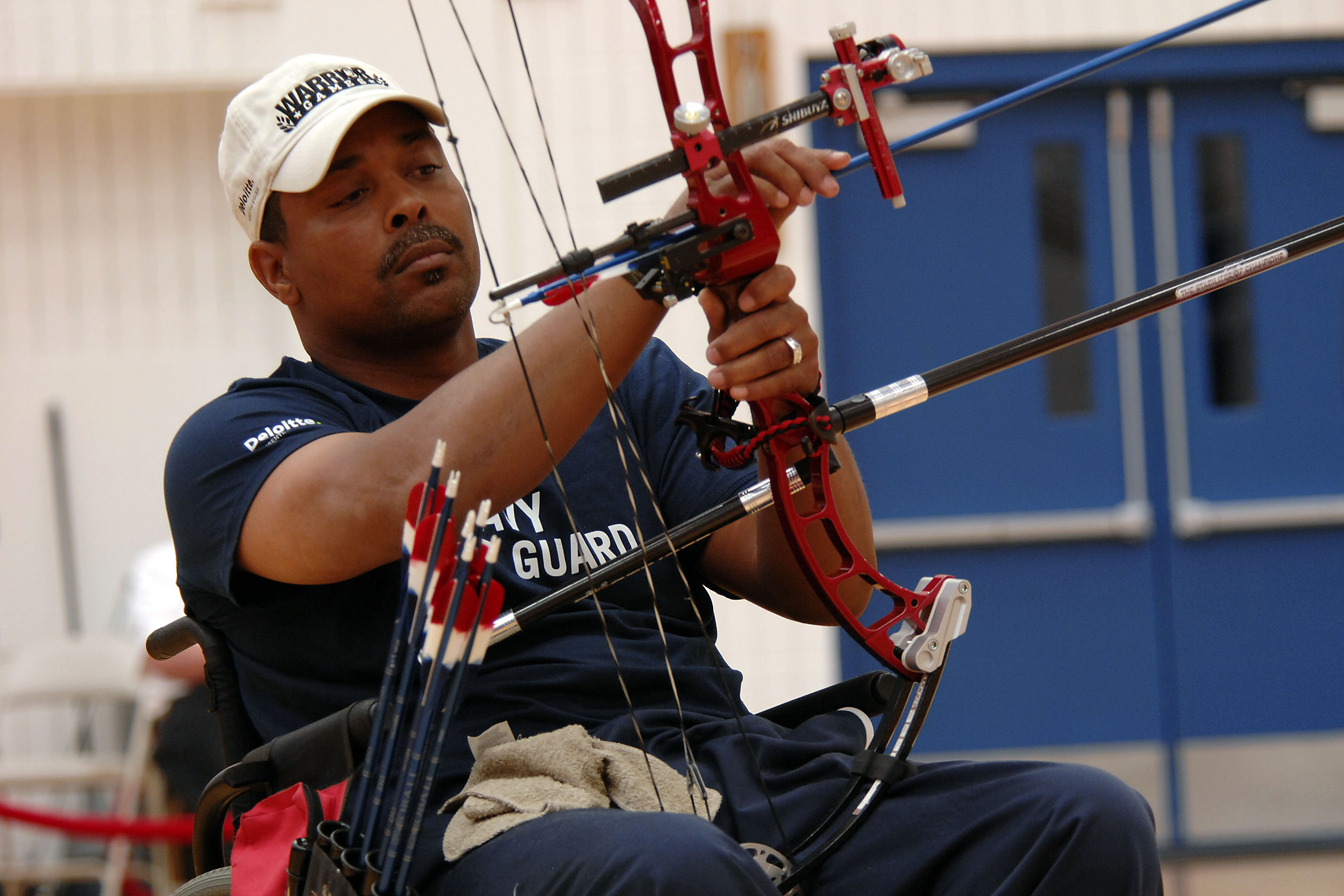
- Shelby in 2011

Personal information
- Nationality: American
- Born: December 8, 1966 (age 59) Jeffersonville, Indiana, United States

Sport
- Sport: Archery
Medal record
Representing United States
Paralympic Games
Archery
| Gold medal – first place | 2016 Rio de Janeiro | Men's individual compound open |
Parapan American Games
| Gold medal – first place | 2015 Toronto | Men's compound |

Andre C. Shelby (born December 8, 1966) is a U.S. Paralympic archer and Paralympic and Parapan champion.

Shelby was born in Jeffersonville, Indiana in 1966 to Lee and Etta Shelby. He graduated from Jeffersonville High School in 1985. At Jeffersonville, Shelby played football and basketball.

Shelby served in the United States Navy for 18 years until an April 2004 motorcycle accident made him reliant on a wheelchair and forced him to retire. Shelby had worked as a boatswain's mate and helped transport troops during the Gulf War.

Shelby discovered archery in 2008. He qualified for the 2016 Summer Paralympics by winning gold at the 2015 Parapan American Games. In the 2016 Summer Paralympics, his debut Paralympics, Shelby won his first Paralympic medal which was gold. He became the first African-American archer to compete in the Paralympics.
