= Table tennis at the 2016 Summer Paralympics – Women's individual – Class 7 =

Table tennis at the XV Paralympic Games
- Venue: Riocentro Pavilion 3
- Dates: 8–12 September 2016
- Competitors: 8 from 8 nations

Medalists
1st place, gold medalist(s)		Kelly van Zon	Netherlands
2nd place, silver medalist(s)		Kubra Korkut	Turkey
3rd place, bronze medalist(s)		Kim Seong-ok	South Korea

The women's individual table tennis – Class 7 tournament at the 2016 Summer Paralympics in Rio de Janeiro took place during 8–12 September 2016 at Riocentro Pavilion 3. Classes 6–10 were for athletes with a physical impairment who competed from a standing position; the lower the number, the greater the impact the impairment was on an athlete’s ability to compete.

In the preliminary stage, athletes competed in two groups of four. Winners and runners-up of each group qualified to the semifinals.

== Results ==
=== Final round ===
Semifinals
A1	Kelly van Zon (NED)	11	12	11
B2	Stephanie Chan (CAN)	7	10	1
A2	Kubra Korkut (TUR)	11	6	11	11
B1	Kim Seong-ok (KOR)	9	11	5	7

Final
A1	Kelly van Zon (NED)	11	11	11
A2	Kubra Korkut (TUR)	9	9	5
Bronze medal match
B2	Stephanie Chan (CAN)	14	7	7	8
B1	Kim Seong-ok (KOR)	12	11	11	11

=== Preliminary rounds ===
Group A

Rank	Competitor	MP	W	L	Points	NED	TUR	ARG	EGY
1	Kelly van Zon (NED)	6	3	0	9:2	x	3:1	3:1	3:0
2	Kubra Korkut (TUR)	5	2	1	7:3	1:3	x	3:1	3:0
3	Giselle Munoz (ARG)	4	1	2	4:6	1:3	0:3	x	3:0
4	Faiza Mahmoud (EGY)	3	0	3	0:9	0:3	0:3	0:3	x

Group B

Rank	Competitor	MP	W	L	Points	KOR	CAN	FRA	CHN
1	Kim Seong-ok (KOR)	6	3	0	9:3	x	3:0	3:1	3:2
2	Stephanie Chan (CAN)	4	1	2	7:6	2:3	x	3:0	2:3
3	Anne Barneoud (FRA)	4	1	2	4:6	1:3	0:3	x	3:0
4	Wang Rui (CHN)	4	1	2	3:7	0:3	0:3	3:2	x
