= Table tennis at the 2012 Summer Paralympics – Women's individual – Class 7 =

Table tennis Women's C7 at the XIV Paralympic Games
- Venue: ExCeL Exhibition Centre
- Dates: 30 August – 3 September 2012
- Competitors: 8 from 7 nations

Medalists
1st place, gold medalist(s)		Kelly van Zon	Netherlands
2nd place, silver medalist(s)		Yulia Ovsyannikova	Russia
3rd place, bronze medalist(s)		Viktoriia Safonova	Ukraine

The Women's individual table tennis – Class 7 tournament at the 2012 Summer Paralympics in London took place from 30 August to 3 September 2012 at ExCeL Exhibition Centre. Classes 6–10 are for athletes with a physical impairment who compete from a standing position; the lower the number, the greater the impact the impairment was on an athlete's ability to compete.

In the preliminary stage, athletes competed in two groups of four. Top two in each group qualified for the semi-finals.

== Results ==
All times are local (BST/UTC+1)

=== Finals ===
Semifinals: 1 Sep 16:45
A1	Kelly van Zon (NED)	10	13	11	11	13
B2	Viktoriia Safonova (UKR)	12	15	9	6	11
A2	Kubra Ocsoy (TUR)	5	11	7	11	8
B1	Yulia Ovsyannikova (RUS)	11	8	11	4	11

Gold-medal match: 3 Sep 16:30
A1	Kelly van Zon (NED)	11	11	6	11
B1	Yulia Ovsyannikova (RUS)	4	7	11	6
Bronze-medal match
B2	Viktoriia Safonova (UKR)	11	11	5	11
A2	Kubra Ocsoy (TUR)	5	3	11	5

=== Preliminary round ===
Qualified for the semifinals

==== Group A ====
Athlete	Won	Lost	Games won	Points diff
Kelly van Zon (NED)	3	0	9	+30
Kubra Ocsoy (TUR)	2	1	7	+14
Anne Barneoud (FRA)	1	2	5	-13
Giselle Munoz (ARG)	0	3	2	-31

30 August, 16:40

Giselle Munoz (ARG)	5	8	11	3
Kelly van Zon (NED)	11	11	6	11

30 August, 16:40

Kubra Ocsoy (TUR)	12	11	12	11
Anne Barneoud (FRA)	14	5	10	7

31 August, 13:00

Anne Barneoud (FRA)	9	11	11	12
Giselle Munoz (ARG)	11	9	7	10

31 August, 13:00

Kubra Ocsoy (TUR)	11	7	6	10
Kelly van Zon (NED)	9	11	11	12

31 August, 19:20

Kelly van Zon (NED)	11	11	11	12
Anne Barneoud (FRA)	8	5	13	10

31 August, 19:20

Kubra Ocsoy (TUR)	11	11	11
Giselle Munoz (ARG)	7	6	7

==== Group B ====
Athlete	Won	Lost	Games won	Points diff
Yulia Ovsyannikova (RUS)	3	0	9	+36
Viktoriia Safonova (UKR)	2	1	6	+4
Wendy Schrijver (NED)	1	2	4	-20
Faiza Mahmoud (EGY)	0	3	3	-20

30 August, 16:40

Wendy Schrijver (NED)	6	7	11	8
Viktoriia Safonova (UKR)	11	11	6	11

30 August, 16:40

Yulia Ovsyannikova (RUS)	11	11	8	11
Faiza Mahmoud (EGY)	6	6	11	9

31 August, 13:00

Faiza Mahmoud (EGY)	9	11	6	11
Wendy Schrijver (NED)	11	4	11	13

31 August, 13:00

Yulia Ovsyannikova (RUS)	12	12	11
Viktoriia Safonova (UKR)	10	10	3

31 August, 19:20

Yulia Ovsyannikova (RUS)	12	11	11
Wendy Schrijver (NED)	10	7	2

31 August, 19:20

Viktoriia Safonova (UKR)	8	11	11	11
Faiza Mahmoud (EGY)	11	7	7	7
