= Table tennis at the 2020 Summer Paralympics – Women's individual – Class 7 =

Table tennis at the XVI Paralympic Games
- Venue: Tokyo Metropolitan Gymnasium
- Dates: 25–30 August 2021
- Competitors: 9 from 9 nations

Medalists
1st place, gold medalist(s)		Kelly van Zon	Netherlands
2nd place, silver medalist(s)		Viktoriia Safonova	RPC
3rd place, bronze medalist(s)		Anne Barnéoud	France
3rd place, bronze medalist(s)		Kübra Korkut	Turkey

The women's individual table tennis – Class 7 tournament at the 2020 Summer Paralympics in Tokyo took place between 25 and 30 August 2021 at Tokyo Metropolitan Gymnasium. Classes 6–10 were for athletes with a physical impairment in their upper body, and who compete in a standing position. The lower the number, the greater the impact the impairment was on an athlete's ability to compete.

In the preliminary stage, athletes competed in three groups of three. The winners and runners-up of each group qualified for the knock-out stage. In this edition of the Games, no bronze medal match was held. The losers of each semifinal were automatically awarded a bronze medal.

== Results ==
All times are local time in UTC+9.

=== Main bracket ===
==== Final rounds ====
Quarterfinals
B2	Viktoriia Safonova (RPC)	11	11	11
C1	Wang Rui (CHN)	6	9	3
C2	Kim Seong-ok (KOR)	6	11	6	3
A2	Kelly van Zon (NED)	11	5	11	11

Semifinals
A1	Anne Barnéoud (FRA) (bronze)	8	9	11	5
B2	Viktoriia Safonova (RPC)	11	11	3	11
A2	Kelly van Zon (NED)	11	3	11	11
B1	Kübra Korkut (TUR) (bronze)	8	11	9	6

Gold medal match
B2	Viktoriia Safonova (RPC) (silver)	13	6	11	11
A2	Kelly van Zon (NED) (gold)	11	11	7	9

=== Preliminary round ===
Qualified for the knock-out stage

==== Group A ====
Seed	Athlete	Won	Lost	Points diff	Rank
6	Anne Barnéoud (FRA)	2	0	+13	1
1	Kelly van Zon (NED)	1	1	+14	2
7	Claudia Pérez Villalba (MEX)	0	2	–27	3

Claudia Pérez Villalba (MEX)	6	8	5
Kelly van Zon (NED)	11	11	11

Anne Barnéoud (FRA)	7	12	11	8	14
Kelly van Zon (NED)	11	10	8	11	12

Anne Barnéoud (FRA)	11	11	11
Claudia Pérez Villalba (MEX)	3	8	9

==== Group B ====
Seed	Athlete	Won	Lost	Points diff	Rank
2	Kübra Korkut (TUR)	2	0	+23	1
4	Viktoriia Safonova (RPC)	1	1	+9	2
9	Nora Korneliussen (NOR)	0	2	–32	3

Nora Korneliussen (NOR)	5	4	8
Kübra Korkut (TUR)	11	11	11

Viktoriia Safonova (RPC)	11	9	10	5
Kübra Korkut (TUR)	8	11	12	11

Viktoriia Safonova (RPC)	11	11	11
Nora Korneliussen (NOR)	6	5	6

==== Group C ====
Seed	Athlete	Won	Lost	Points diff	Rank
3	Wang Rui (CHN)	3	0	+42	1
5	Kim Seong-ok (KOR)	2	1	–4	2
8	Millena França dos Santos (BRA)	1	2	–38	3

Millena França dos Santos (BRA)	4	1	3
Wang Rui (CHN)	11	11	11

Kim Seong-ok (KOR)	7	6	3
Wang Rui (CHN)	11	11	11

Kim Seong-ok (KOR)	11	11	11
Millena França dos Santos (BRA)	6	8	6
