= Table tennis at the 2008 Summer Paralympics – Women's individual – Class 6–7 =

Women's Individual Class 6-7 at the XIII Paralympic Games
- Venue: Peking University Gymnasium
- Dates: 7 – 11 September 2008
- Competitors: 12 from 9 nations

Medalists
| 1st place, gold medalist(s) | | Natalia Martyasheva | Russia |
| 2nd place, silver medalist(s) | | Yulia Ovsyannikova | Russia |
| 3rd place, bronze medalist(s) | | Kelly van Zon | Netherlands |

The Women's Individual Class 6-7 table tennis competition at the 2008 Summer Paralympics was held between 7 September and 11 September at the Peking University Gymnasium.

Classes 6–10 were for athletes with a physical impairment who competed from a standing position; the lower the number, the greater the impact the impairment had on an athlete’s ability to compete.

The event was won by Natalia Martyasheva, representing Russia.

== Results ==
=== Preliminary round ===
| Qualified for the knock-out stages |

==== Group A ====
| Rank | Competitor | MP | W | L | Points | NED | POL | AUS |
|---|---|---|---|---|---|---|---|---|
| 1 | Kelly van Zon (NED) | 2 | 2 | 0 | 6:2 | x | 3:0 | 3:2 |
| 2 | Katarzyna Pitry (POL) | 2 | 1 | 1 | 3:3 | 0:3 | x | 3:0 |
| 3 | Rebecca Julian (AUS) | 2 | 0 | 2 | 2:6 | 2:3 | 0:3 | x |

| 7 September, 13:20: Kelly van Zon (NED) / 11 / 10 / 9 / 11 / 11; Rebecca Julian (AUS) / 7 / 12 / 11 / 8 / 3 | 8 September, 17:20: Katarzyna Pitry (POL) / 11 / 11 / 11; Rebecca Julian (AUS) / 8 / 9 / 5 | 9 September, 16:40: Kelly van Zon (NED) / 11 / 11 / 11; Katarzyna Pitry (POL) / 8 / 6 / 8 |

==== Group B ====
| Rank | Competitor | MP | W | L | Points | RUS | UKR | KOR |
|---|---|---|---|---|---|---|---|---|
| 1 | Yulia Ovsyannikova (RUS) | 2 | 2 | 0 | 6:2 | x | 3:2 | 3:0 |
| 2 | Viktoriia Safonova (UKR) | 2 | 1 | 1 | 5:4 | 2:3 | x | 3:1 |
| 3 | Na Yu Rim (KOR) | 2 | 0 | 2 | 1:6 | 0:3 | 1:3 | x |

| 7 September, 13:20: Yulia Ovsyannikova (RUS) / 11 / 11 / 11; Na Yu-rim (KOR) / 5 / 6 / 8 | 8 September, 17:20: Viktoriia Safonova (UKR) / 9 / 11 / 11 / 11; Na Yu-rim (KOR) / 11 / 8 / 8 / 4 | 9 September, 16:40: Yulia Ovsyannikova (RUS) / 11 / 11 / 8 / 6 / 11; Viktoriia Safonova (UKR) / 7 / 7 / 11 / 11 / 8 |

==== Group C ====
| Rank | Competitor | MP | W | L | Points | RUS | UKR | FRA |
|---|---|---|---|---|---|---|---|---|
| 1 | Natalia Martyasheva (RUS) | 2 | 2 | 0 | 6:1 | x | 3:1 | 3:0 |
| 2 | Antonina Khodzynska (UKR) | 2 | 1 | 1 | 4:3 | 1:3 | x | 3:0 |
| 3 | Anne Barneoud (FRA) | 2 | 0 | 2 | 0:6 | 0:3 | 0:3 | x |

| 7 September, 13:20: Natalia Martyasheva (RUS) / 11 / 11 / 11; Anne Barneoud (FRA) / 4 / 5 / 1 | 8 September, 17:20: Antonina Khodzynska (UKR) / 11 / 12 / 11; Anne Barneoud (FRA) / 3 / 10 / 9 | 9 September, 16:40: Natalia Martyasheva (RUS) / 11 / 11 / 7 / 11; Antonina Khodzynska (UKR) / 4 / 3 / 11 / 6 |

==== Group D ====
| Rank | Competitor | MP | W | L | Points | EGY | UKR | ARG |
|---|---|---|---|---|---|---|---|---|
| 1 | Faiza Mahmoud Afify (EGY) | 2 | 2 | 0 | 6:4 | x | 3:2 | 3:2 |
| 2 | Yuliya Klymenko (UKR) | 2 | 1 | 1 | 5:3 | 2:3 | x | 3:0 |
| 3 | Giselle Munoz (ARG) | 2 | 0 | 2 | 2:6 | 2:3 | 0:3 | x |

| 7 September, 13:20: Faiza Mahmoud Afify (EGY) / 11 / 11 / 11 / 7 / 11; Yuliya Klymenko (UKR) / 8 / 6 / 13 / 11 / 8 | 8 September, 17:20: Yuliya Klymenko (UKR) / 11 / 11 / 11; Giselle Munoz (ARG) / 7 / 3 / 6 | 9 September, 16:40: Faiza Mahmoud Afify (EGY) / 11 / 8 / 4 / 11 / 11; Giselle Munoz (ARG) / 8 / 11 / 11 / 7 / 7 |

=== Competition bracket ===
Semifinals: 10 Sep 10:45
Kelly van Zon (NED) | 6 | 11 | 13 | 8 | 11
Natalia Martyasheva (RUS) | 11 | 8 | 11 | 11 | 13
Faiza Mahmoud Afify (EGY) | 11 | 2 | 3
Yulia Ovsyannikova (RUS) | 13 | 11 | 11

Gold medal match: 11 Sep 10:45
Natalia Martyasheva (RUS) | 11 | 14 | 9 | 12
Yulia Ovsyannikova (RUS) | 8 | 12 | 11 | 10
Bronze medal match: 11 Sep 10:45
Kelly van Zon (NED) | 11 | 11 | 11
Faiza Mahmoud Afify (EGY) | 9 | 8 | 8
