= Iranildo Conceição Espíndola =

Brazilian para table tennis player (born 1969)

Personal information
- Nickname: Iran
- Born: 24 January 1969 (age 57) Silvânia, Brazil

Sport
- Country: Brazil
- Sport: Para table tennis
- Disability: Spinal cord injury
- Disability class: C2
Medal record
Para table tennis
Representing Brazil
Paralympic Games
| Bronze medal – third place | 2016 Rio de Janeiro | Men's teams C1-2 |
Parapan American Games
| Gold medal – first place | 2007 Rio de Janeiro | Men's singles C2 |
| Gold medal – first place | 2007 Rio de Janeiro | Men's teams C1-2 |
| Gold medal – first place | 2011 Guadalajara | Men's singles C1-2 |
| Gold medal – first place | 2011 Guadalajara | Men's teams C1-3 |
| Gold medal – first place | 2015 Toronto | Men's singles C2 |
| Gold medal – first place | 2015 Toronto | Men's teams C1-2 |
| Gold medal – first place | 2019 Lima | Men's teams C1-2 |
Pan American Championships
| Gold medal – first place | 2003 Brasilia | Men's singles C2 |
| Gold medal – first place | 2003 Brasilia | Men's teams C1-2 |
| Gold medal – first place | 2005 Mar del Plata | Men's singles C2 |
| Gold medal – first place | 2009 Margarita Island | Men's teams C1-2 |
| Silver medal – second place | 2005 Mar del Plata | Men's teams C5 |
| Silver medal – second place | 2017 San Jose | Men's teams C3 |
| Bronze medal – third place | 2001 Buenos Aires | Men's singles C2 |
| Bronze medal – third place | 2009 Margarita Island | Men's singles C1-2 |
| Bronze medal – third place | 2013 San Jose | Men's singles C2 |
| Bronze medal – third place | 2017 San Jose | Men's singles C2 |

Iranildo Conceição Espíndola (born 24 January 1969) is a Brazilian para table tennis player who competes in international level events. He is a seven-time Parapan American Games champion and a four-time Pan American champion. He has participated at the Paralympic Games four times and has won one bronze medal.
