= Edith Sigala =

Mexican para table tennis player

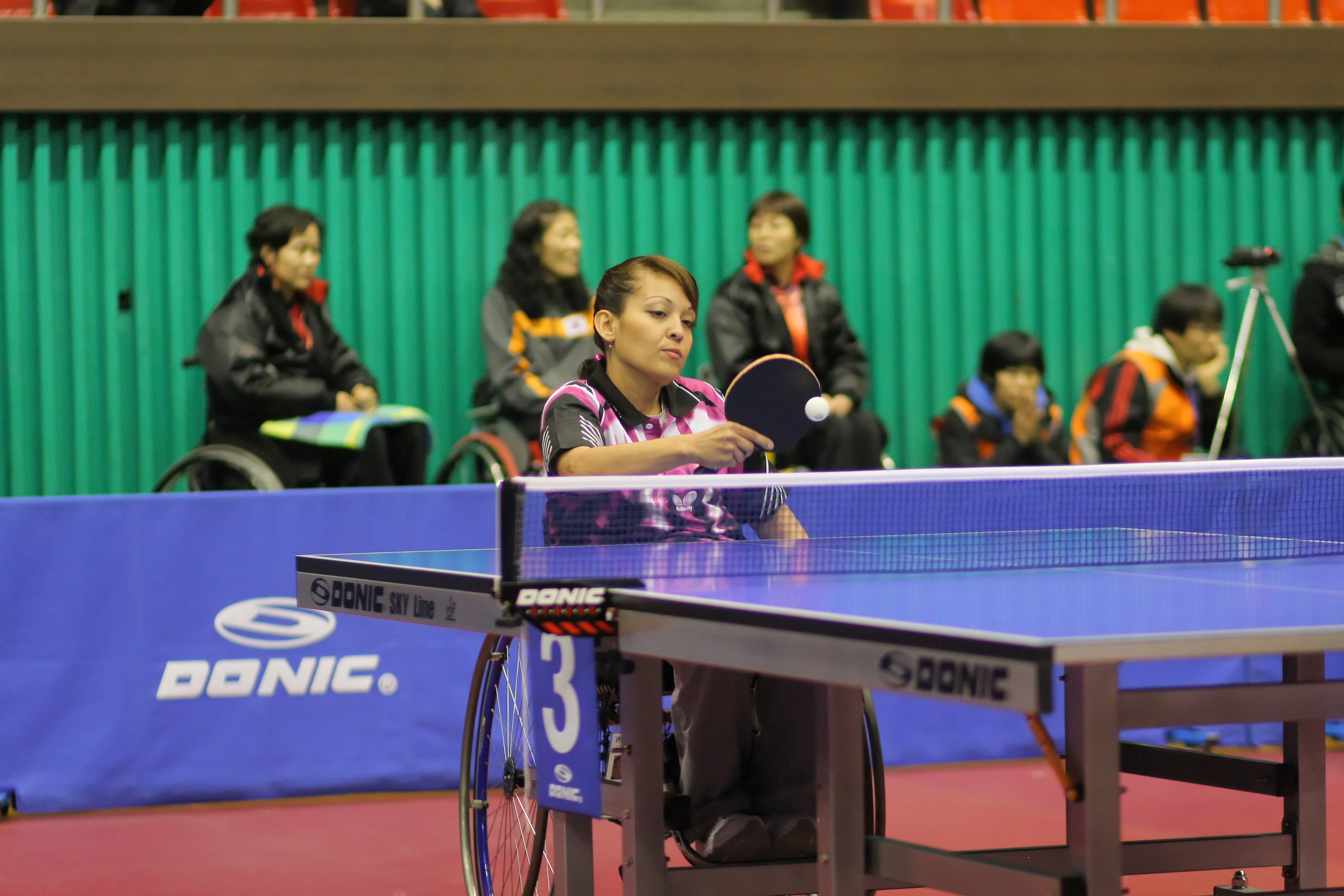
- Sigala at 2010 World Para Table Tennis Championships

Personal information
- Full name: María Edith Sigala López
- Born: 16 June 1976 (age 50) Guadalajara, Mexico
- Height: 160 cm (5 ft 3 in)

Sport
- Country: Mexico
- Sport: Para table tennis
- Disability: Spinal cord injury
- Disability class: C3
Medal record
Para table tennis
Representing Mexico
Parapan American Games
Gold medal – first place	2019 Lima	Women's singles C2-3
Gold medal – first place	2015 Toronto	Women's singles C3
Gold medal – first place	2011 Guadalajara	Women's teams C4-5
Silver medal – second place	2007 Rio de Janeiro	Women's singles C1-3
Silver medal – second place	2019 Lima	Women's teams C2-5
Bronze medal – third place	2007 Rio de Janeiro	Women's singles C1-3
Bronze medal – third place	2011 Guadalajara	Women's singles C1-3
Pan American Championships
Gold medal – first place	2005 Mar del Plata	Women's singles C1-3
Gold medal – first place	2009 Margarita Island	Women's open singles
Gold medal – first place	2009 Margarita Island	Women's teams C4-5
Gold medal – first place	2013 San Jose	Women's singles C1-3
Gold medal – first place	2017 San Jose	Women's singles C1-3
Silver medal – second place	2009 Margarita Island	Women's singles C1-3
Bronze medal – third place	2003 Brasilia	Women's singles C3
Bronze medal – third place	2003 Brasilia	Women's teams C1-3

María Edith Sigala López (born 16 June 1976) is a Mexican para table tennis player who competes in international level events. She is a triple Parapan American Games champion and four-time Pan American champion. She has also participated at the 2012 and 2016 Summer Paralympics.
