= Maria Passos =

Brazilian para table tennis player

Personal information
- Full name: Maria Luiza Pereira Passos
- Nickname: Malu
- Born: 9 June 1951 (age 75) Bandeirantes, Paraná, Brazil

Sport
- Country: Brazil
- Sport: Para table tennis
- Disability class: C5
- Retired: 2017
Medal record
Para table tennis
Representing Brazil
Parapan American Games
Silver medal – second place	2015 Toronto	Singles C5
Silver medal – second place	2015 Toronto	Teams C4-5
Bronze medal – third place	2007 Rio de Janeiro	Singles C4-5
Bronze medal – third place	2007 Rio de Janeiro	Teams C4-5
Bronze medal – third place	2011 Guadalajara	Singles C5
Pan American Championships
Silver medal – second place	2003 Brasilia	Singles C5
Silver medal – second place	2003 Brasilia	Teams C4-5
Silver medal – second place	2009 Margarita Island	Singles C4-5
Silver medal – second place	2009 Margarita Island	Teams C4-5
Bronze medal – third place	2005 Mar del Plata	Open singles
Bronze medal – third place	2005 Mar del Plata	Teams C1-5
Bronze medal – third place	2013 San Jose	Singles C4-5

Maria Luiza Pereira Passos (born 9 June 1951) is a Brazilian retired para table tennis player who competed at international table tennis competitions. She formerly played in volleyball before being diagnosed with a malignant tumour in her bone marrow, requiring the use of a wheelchair. She is a five-time Parapan American Games medalist and has competed at the 1996, 2008 and 2012 Summer Paralympics.
