= María Paredes (table tennis) =

Mexican table tennis player

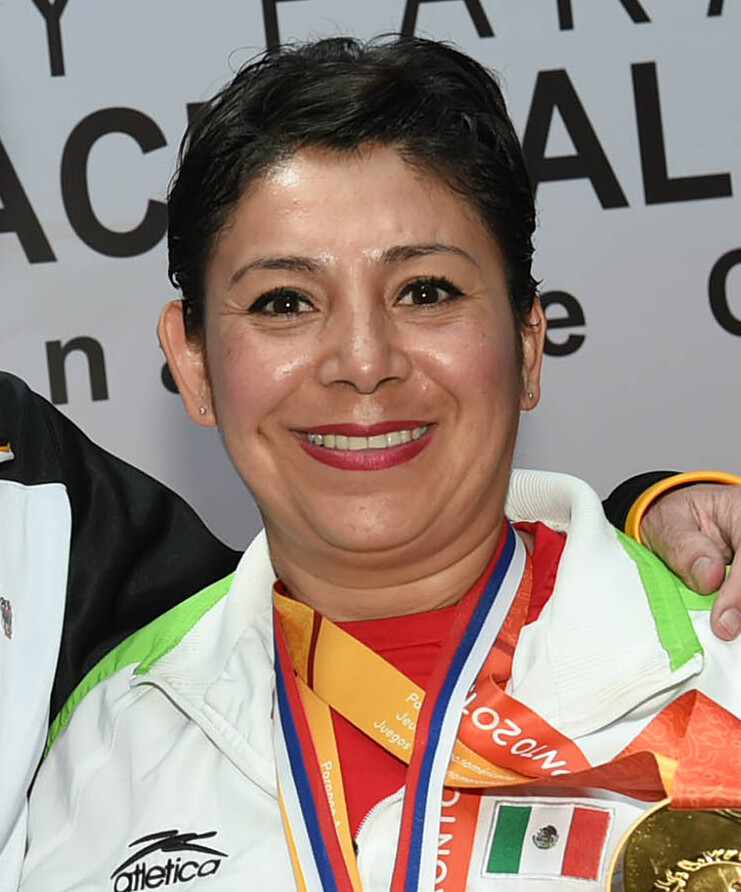
- Paredes in 2016

Personal information
- Born: 5 September 1974 (age 51) Mexico City, Mexico

Sport
- Sport: Para table tennis
- Disability: Polio
Medal record
Representing Mexico
Parapan American Games
| Gold medal – first place | 1999 Mexico City | Team C4-5 |
| Gold medal – first place | 2007 Rio de Janeiro | Singles C4-5 |
| Gold medal – first place | 2007 Rio de Janeiro | Teams C4-5 |
| Gold medal – first place | 2011 Guadalajara | Singles C5 |
| Gold medal – first place | 2015 Toronto | Singles C5 |
| Gold medal – first place | 2015 Toronto | Teams C4-5 |
Pan American Championships
| Gold medal – first place | 2003 Brasilia | Teams C4-5 |
| Gold medal – first place | 2005 Mar del Plata | Singles C4-5 |
| Gold medal – first place | 2005 Mar del Plata | Teams C1-5 |
| Gold medal – first place | 2009 Margarita Island | Singles C4-5 |
| Gold medal – first place | 2009 Margarita Island | Teams C4-5 |
| Silver medal – second place | 2005 Mar del Plata | Open singles |
| Silver medal – second place | 2009 Margarita Island | Open singles |
| Silver medal – second place | 2013 San Jose | Singles C4-5 |
| Bronze medal – third place | 2003 Brasilia | Singles C5 |

María Paredes Albor (born 5 September 1974) is a Mexican former para table tennis player who competed at international table tennis competitions. She is a six-time consecutive Parapan American Games champion and has won five gold medals at the Pan American Championships.
