= Martin Pelletier =

Canadian para table tennis player

Personal information
- Born: 1 April 1967 (age 59) Gatineau, Quebec, Canada

Sport
- Country: Canada
- Sport: Para table tennis
- Disability class: C9
Medal record
Para table tennis
Representing Canada
Parapan American Games
Bronze medal – third place	1999 Mexico City	Men's singles C9-10
Bronze medal – third place	2007 Rio de Janeiro	Men's teams C9-10
Para Pan-American Championships
Gold medal – first place	2001 Buenos Aires	Men's singles C10
Bronze medal – third place	2003 Brasilia	Men's singles C9
Bronze medal – third place	2005 Mar del Plata	Men's teams C10

Martin Pelletier (born April 1, 1967) is a former Canadian para table tennis player who has competed in five Parapan American Games. He was a teammate of Ian Kent who has also won multiple medals.

In July 1992, Pelletier was involved in a serious motorcycle accident which resulted in a right arm amputation, he started playing table tennis recreationally with friends two years after the accident. He became the first Canadian table tennis player to win a table tennis title in 2001 in Buenos Aires, he went on to compete in the 2000 Summer Paralympics but didn't advance to final rounds.
