= Ian Kent =

Canadian para table tennis player

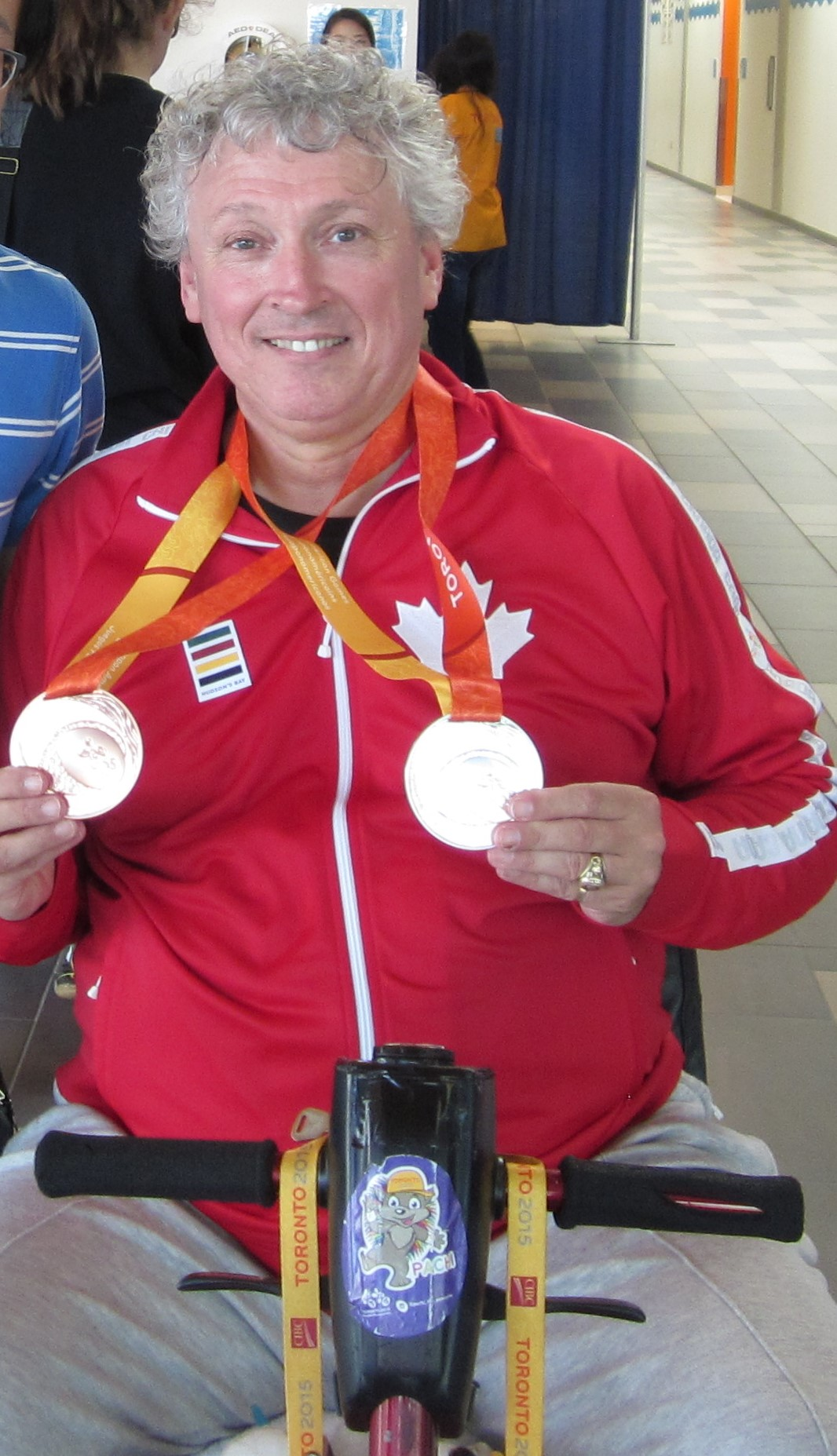

Personal information
- Born: July 4, 1961 (age 64) Welling, United Kingdom
- Height: 180 cm (5 ft 11 in)
- Weight: 91 kg (201 lb)

Sport
- Country: Canada
- Sport: Para table tennis
- Disability: Dystonia
- Disability class: C8
Medal record
Para table tennis
Representing Canada
Parapan American Games
Gold medal – first place	2011 Guadalajara	Men's singles C8
Silver medal – second place	2007 Rio de Janeiro	Men's singles C8
Silver medal – second place	2007 Rio de Janeiro	Men's teams C8
Silver medal – second place	2011 Guadalajara	Men's teams C6-8
Silver medal – second place	2015 Toronto	Men's teams C6-8
Bronze medal – third place	2015 Toronto	Men's singles C8
Bronze medal – third place	2019 Lima	Men's singles C8
Para Pan-American Championships
Gold medal – first place	2009 Margarita Island	Men's singles C8
Gold medal – first place	2013 San Jose	Men's teams C8
Gold medal – first place	2017 San Jose	Men's teams C8
Silver medal – second place	2005 Mar del Plata	Men's singles C10
Bronze medal – third place	2005 Mar del Plata	Men's teams C10
Bronze medal – third place	2013 San Jose	Men's singles C8
Bronze medal – third place	2017 San Jose	Men's singles C8

Ian Kent (born July 4, 1961) is a Canadian para table tennis player. He is a double singles champion in the Para Pan-American Para Table Tennis Championships and has won seven medals in Parapan American Games.

== Biography ==
Kent was born in Welling in London then he moved to Canada with his parents as a young child, his mother is a former British track and field athlete. He holds a bachelor of science degree in mathematics and psychology from Saint Mary's University.

He has three sons, Isaac, Tyler and Matthew and two of them are one of Nova Scotia's top ranked table tennis players while Ian is still top ranked.

In 1999, Kent was aged 38, was diagnosed with dystonia and was bedridden for two years.

== Sporting career ==
Kent first started playing competitively in 2004 when he played in the EuroChamp Table Tennis Tournament in Emmen, Netherlands. He only started winning medals in 2005 at the Para Pan-American Championships in Mar del Plata where he won a silver medal in the singles tournament and a bronze medal in the teams tournament with Martin Pelletier.

He has competed in the 2008 Summer Paralympics and also 2018 Commonwealth Games but did not advance to the final rounds in both tournaments.
