= Table tennis at the 2015 Parapan American Games =

- Venue: Markham Pan Am Centre
- Dates: 8–13 August 2015
- Competitors: 122 from 16 nations

Para table tennis event at the 2015 Parapan American Games was played from 8–13 August 2015 at the Markham Pan Am Centre.

== Participating nations ==
- Argentina (16)
- Brazil (28)
- Canada (10)
- Chile (10)
- Colombia (6)
- Costa Rica (5)
- Cuba (6)
- Dominican Republic (1)
- El Salvador (2)
- Ecuador (2)
- Guatemala (1)
- Mexico (8)
- Puerto Rico (2)
- Trinidad and Tobago (1)
- United States (15)
- Venezuela (9)

== Medal summary ==
=== Medal table ===
* Host nation (Canada)

Rank	Nation	Gold	Silver	Bronze	Total
1	Brazil	15	10	6	31
2	Mexico	4	4	3	11
3	United States	2	3	3	8
4	Venezuela	1	1	3	5
5	Canada*	1	1	1	3
6	Chile	1	0	3	4
7	Argentina	0	4	4	8
8	Cuba	0	1	3	4
9	Colombia	0	0	2	2
9	Costa Rica	0	0	2	2
9	Ecuador	0	0	2	2
Totals (11 entries)		24	24	32	80

=== Medalists ===
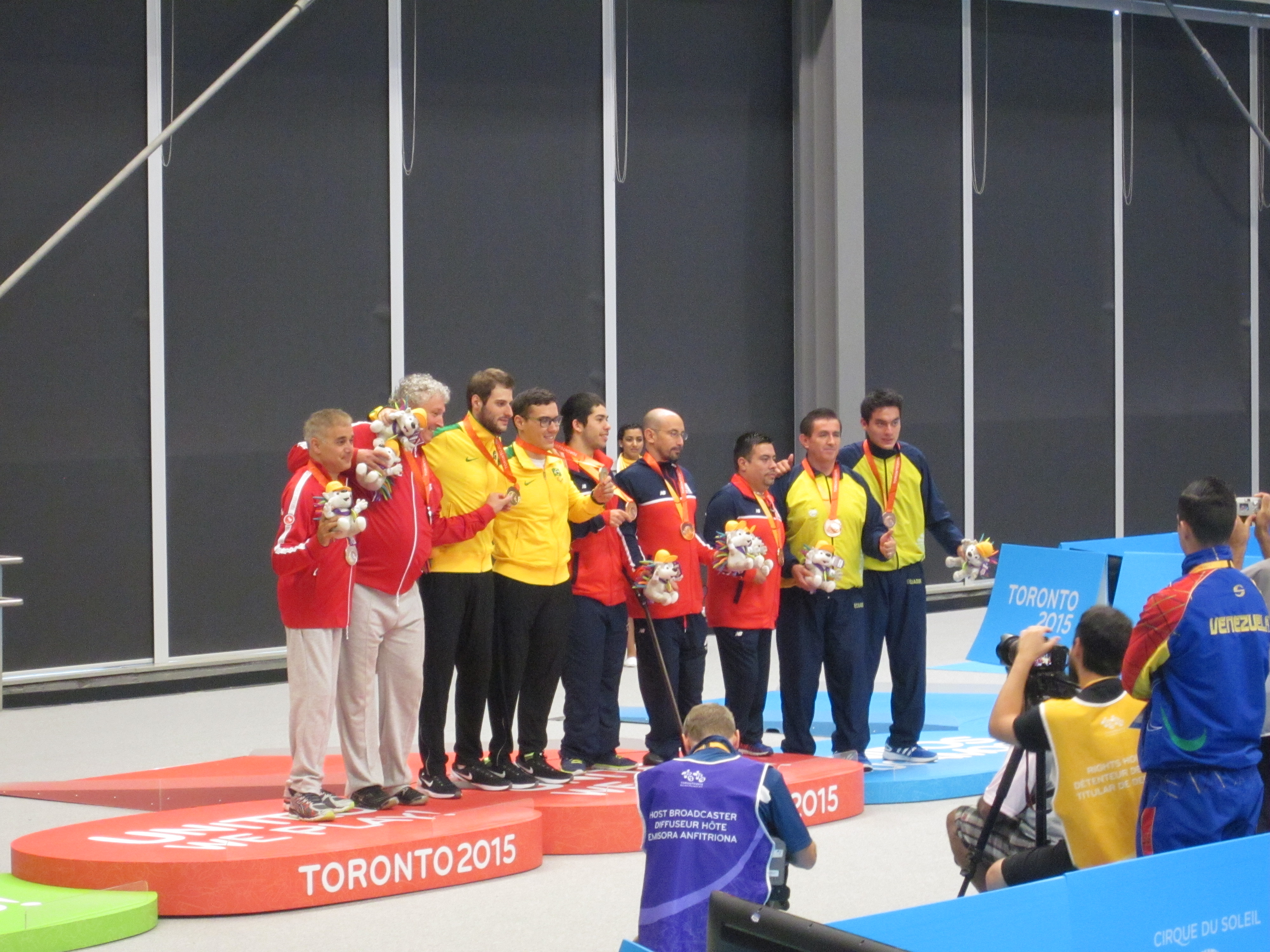
Medal ceremony for table tennis men's team class 6-8

Event	Class	Gold	Silver	Bronze
Men singles	Class 1	Aloísio Lima; Brazil	Yunier Fernandez; Cuba	Bruno Braga; Brazil
Men singles	Class 1	Aloísio Lima; Brazil	Yunier Fernandez; Cuba	Fernando Eberhardt; Argentina
Men singles	Class 2	Iranildo Conceição Espíndola; Brazil	Ronaldo Machado; Brazil	Guilherme Da Costa; Brazil
Men singles	Class 3	David De Freitas; Brazil	Welder Knaf; Brazil	Gabriel Copola; Argentina
Men singles	Class 3	David De Freitas; Brazil	Welder Knaf; Brazil	Geovanni Rodriguez; Costa Rica
Men singles	Class 4	Edson Sanchez; Venezuela	Ezequiel Babes; Brazil	Jesús Sánchez; Mexico
Men singles	Class 4	Edson Sanchez; Venezuela	Ezequiel Babes; Brazil	Alexandre Macieira; Brazil
Men singles	Class 5	Claudiomiro Segatto; Brazil	Mauro Depergola; Argentina	Daniel Rodriguez Ochoa; Argentina
Men singles	Class 5	Claudiomiro Segatto; Brazil	Mauro Depergola; Argentina	Elias Romero; Argentina
Men singles	Class 6	Matías Pino; Chile	Ari Arratia; United States	Domingo Arguello; Costa Rica
Men singles	Class 6	Matías Pino; Chile	Ari Arratia; United States	Carlo Michell; Brazil
Men singles	Class 7	Paulo Salmin; Brazil	Israel Pereira Stroh; Brazil	Cristián Dettoni; Chile
Men singles	Class 7	Paulo Salmin; Brazil	Israel Pereira Stroh; Brazil	Jose Pirajan; Colombia
Men singles	Class 8	Luiz Manara; Brazil	Lim Ming Chui; United States	Ian Kent; Canada
Men singles	Class 8	Luiz Manara; Brazil	Lim Ming Chui; United States	Paul Astudillo; Ecuador
Men singles	Class 9	Tahl Leibovitz; United States	Ariff Vazquez; Mexico	Diego Moreira; Brazil
Men singles	Class 9	Tahl Leibovitz; United States	Ariff Vazquez; Mexico	Erick Higa; Brazil
Men singles	Class 10	Carlos Júnior; Brazil	Cláudio Massad; Brazil	Erich Manso; Cuba
Men singles	Class 10	Carlos Júnior; Brazil	Cláudio Massad; Brazil	Rene Dominguez; Mexico
Men singles	Class 11	Benjamin Hadden; United States	Denisos Martinez; Venezuela	N/A
Women singles	Class 1-2	Cátia Oliveira; Brazil	Alma Padilla; Mexico	N/A
Women singles	Class 3	Edith Sigala; Mexico	Thais Severo; Brazil	Pamela Fontaine; United States
Women singles	Class 3	Edith Sigala; Mexico	Thais Severo; Brazil	Yanelis Silva; Cuba
Women singles	Class 4	Joyce Oliveira; Brazil	Martha Verdin; Mexico	Yoleidy Andrade; Venezuela
Women singles	Class 5	Maria Paredes; Mexico	Maria Passos; Brazil	Nelly Alcaron; Colombia
Women singles	Class 5	Maria Paredes; Mexico	Maria Passos; Brazil	Tamara Leonelli; Chile
Women singles	Class 6	Stephanie Chan; Canada	Giselle Munoz; Argentina	Sherri Umscheid; United States
Women singles	Class 9-10	Danielle Rauen; Brazil	Jennyfer Parinos; Brazil	N/A
Men's team	Class 1-2	Brazil (BRA); Iranildo Conceicao Espindola; Guilherme Marcio Da Costa; Ronaldo Pinheiro Machado	Argentina (ARG); Carlos Duarte; Fernando Eberhardt	N/A
Men's team	Class 3-4	Brazil (BRA); David Andrade De Freitas; Welder Knaf; Alexandre Macieira Ank	Mexico (MEX); Jesus Algueiro; Jesús Sánchez	Venezuela (VEN); Edson Gomez Sanchez; Luis Rojas Salazar; Eligio Vento Cunha
Men's team	Class 5	Brazil (BRA); Ezequiel Babes; Ivanildo Pessoa De Freitas; Claudiomiro Segatto	Argentina (ARG); Gabriel Copola; Mauro Depergola; Daniel Rodriguez Ochoa	N/A
Men's team	Class 6-8	Brazil (BRA); Luiz Guarnieri Manara; Paulo Salmin	Canada (CAN); Ian Kent; Masoud Mojtahed	Ecuador (ECU); Paul Polo Astudillo; Gabriel Salazar Perez
Men's team	Class 6-8	Brazil (BRA); Luiz Guarnieri Manara; Paulo Salmin	Canada (CAN); Ian Kent; Masoud Mojtahed	Chile (CHI); Cristian Dettoni; Matias Pino Lorca; Juan Sepulveda Pardo
Men's team	Class 9-10	Brazil (BRA); Carlos Carbinato Junior; Claudio Massad	United States (USA); Lim Ming Chui; Tahl Leibovitz	Mexico (MEX); Rene Dominguez; Ariff Vazquez
Men's team	Class 9-10	Brazil (BRA); Carlos Carbinato Junior; Claudio Massad	United States (USA); Lim Ming Chui; Tahl Leibovitz	Cuba (CUB); Erich Manso; Jorge Rodriguez Hidalco
Women's team	Class 1-3	Mexico (MEX); Alma Padilla; Edith Sigala	Brazil (BRA); Catia Da Silva Oliveira; Thais Fraga Severo	N/A
Women's team	Class 4-5	Mexico (MEX); Maria Paredes; Martha Verdin	Brazil (BRA); Joyce Oliveira; Maria Pereira Passos	United States (USA); Jennifer Johnson; Cynthia Ranii
Women's team	Class 4-5	Mexico (MEX); Maria Paredes; Martha Verdin	Brazil (BRA); Joyce Oliveira; Maria Pereira Passos	Venezuela (VEN); Yoleidy Fernandez Andrade; Maria Pulgar Molero

== See also ==
- Table tennis at the 2016 Summer Paralympics
