= Mauro Depergola =

Argentine para table tennis player

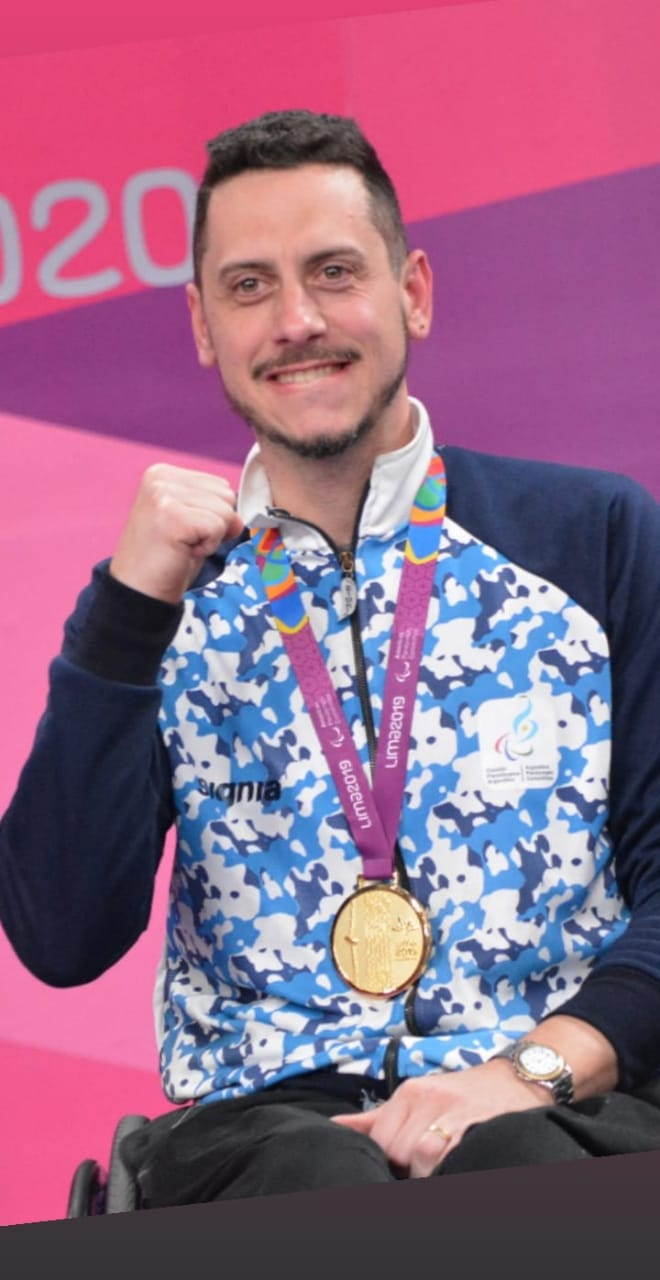
- Depergola at 2019 Parapan American Games

Personal information
- Born: 20 May 1981 (age 45) Buenos Aires, Argentina
- Height: 191 cm (6 ft 3 in)

Sport
- Country: Argentina
- Sport: Para table tennis
- Disability class: C5
Medal record
Para table tennis
Representing Argentina
Parapan American Games
Gold medal – first place	2011 Guadalajara	Men's teams C4-5
Gold medal – first place	2019 Lima	Men's singles C5
Silver medal – second place	2015 Toronto	Men's singles C5
Silver medal – second place	2015 Toronto	Men's teams C5
Bronze medal – third place	2019 Lima	Men's team C3-5
Pan American Championships
Gold medal – first place	2009 Margarita Island	Men's teams C5
Gold medal – first place	2017 San Jose	Men's teams C4-5
Silver medal – second place	2013 San Jose	Men's singles C5
Bronze medal – third place	2017 San Jose	Men's teams C3-5

Mauro Depergola (born 20 May 1981) is an Argentine para table tennis player who competes in international level events. He has been crowned a double champion at the Pan American Table Tennis Championships and has earned a total of five medals, including two golds, at the Parapan American Games.
