= Stephanie Chan =

Canadian para table tennis player

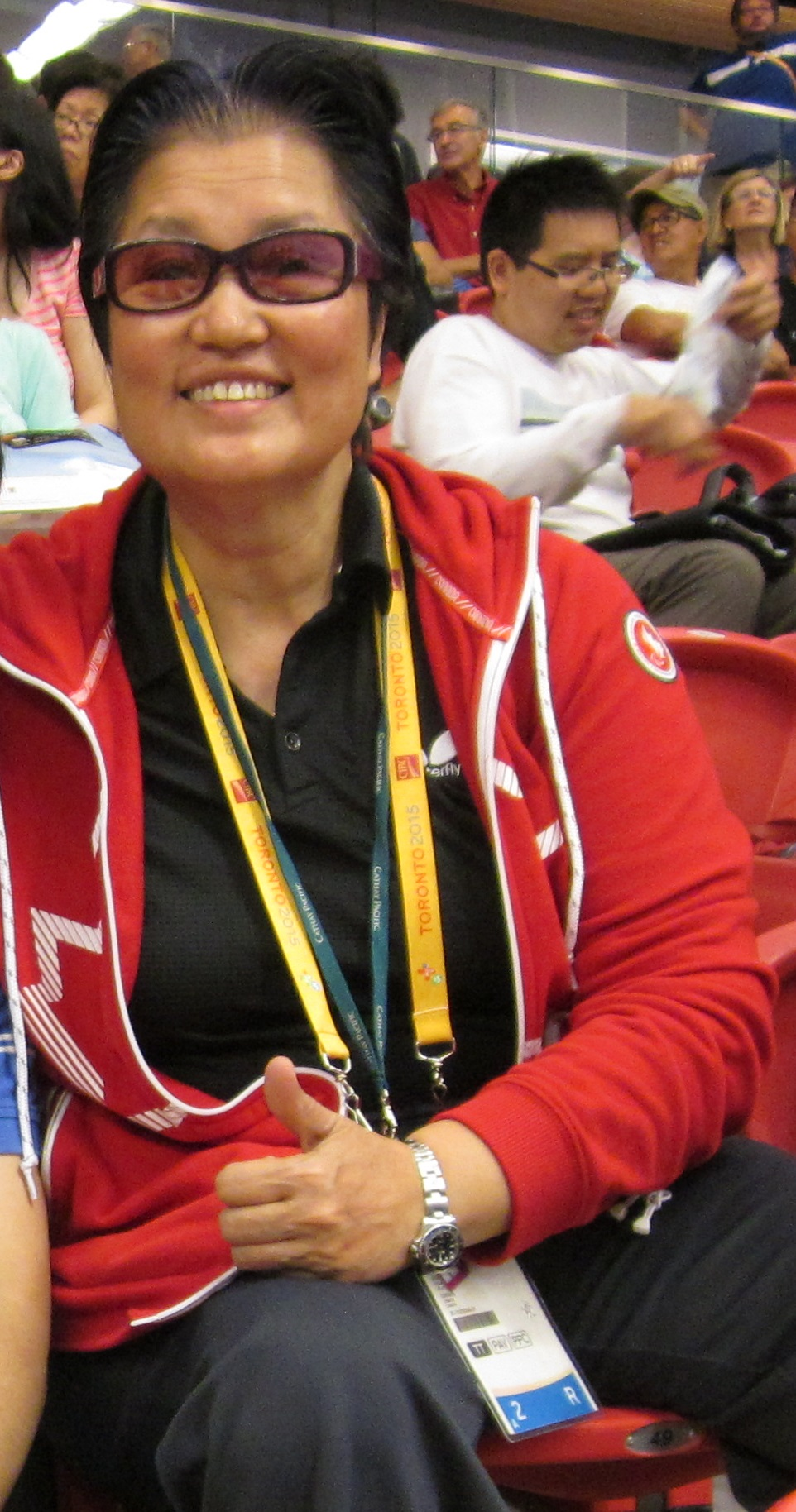

Personal information
- Full name: Chim-Hing (Stephanie) Chan
- Born: July 30, 1957 (age 68) British Hong Kong
- Home town: Richmond, British Columbia, Canada
- Height: 165 cm (5 ft 5 in)
- Weight: 85 kg (187 lb)

Sport
- Country: Canada
- Sport: Para table tennis
- Disability: Polio
- Disability class: C7
- Coached by: Chang-Chun Yu; John MacPherson
Medal record
Para table tennis
Representing Canada
Parapan American Games
Gold medal – first place	2015 Toronto	Women's singles C6-7
Silver medal – second place	2007 Rio de Janeiro	Women's singles C6-8
Silver medal – second place	2011 Guadalajara	Women's singles C7-9
Bronze medal – third place	2007 Rio de Janeiro	Women's open singles
Bronze medal – third place	2019 Lima	Women's singles C7
Para Pan-American Championships
Bronze medal – third place	2009 Margarita Island	Women's singles C6-8
Bronze medal – third place	2009 Margarita Island	Women's open singles
Bronze medal – third place	2017 San Jose	Women's singles C7-9

Chim-Hing Stephanie Chan (Chinese: 陳暹卿, born July 30, 1957) is a Canadian para table tennis player who has won four medals in three Parapan American Games. She contracted polio at the age of four but began playing table tennis at the age of 44. She was the first female Canadian table tennis player to compete in the Paralympic Games in 2016.
