= Viktoriia Safonova (table tennis) =

Ukrainian-Russian Paralympic table tennis player

Personal information
- Full name: Viktoriia Nikolayevna Safonova
- Born: 18 April 1988 (age 38) Simferopol, Ukrainian SSR, Soviet Union

Sport
- Country: Ukraine (before 2016); Russia (after 2016)
- Sport: Para table tennis
- Disability class: C7
Medal record
Para table tennis
Paralympic Games
Representing RPC
Silver medal – second place	2020 Tokyo	Individual
Representing Ukraine
Bronze medal – third place	2012 London	Individual
World Championships
Gold medal – first place	2017 Bratislava	Team
European Para Table Tennis Championships
Gold medal – first place	2017 Lasko	Singles class 7
Bronze medal – third place	2017 Lasko	Team class 6–8
Bronze medal – third place	2019 Helsingborg	Singles class 7
Bronze medal – third place	2019 Helsingborg	Team class 6–8

Viktoriia Nikolayevna Safonova (Russian: Виктория Николаевна Сафонова, Ukrainian: Вікторія Миколаївна Сафонова; born 18 April 1988) is a Ukrainian-Russian female para table tennis player competing at singles (class 7) and team events (class 6–8). She represented Ukraine at the 2008 and 2012 Summer Paralympics, winning bronze in the latter. She represented Russia at 2020 Summer Paralympics where she won a silver medal, having lost to Kelly van Zon in the women's class 7 final.
