= Cristián Dettoni =

Chilean para table tennis player

Personal information
- Full name: Cristián Ignacio Dettoni Jorquera
- Born: 8 October 1974 (age 51) Santiago, Chile

Sport
- Country: Chile
- Sport: Para table tennis
- Disability: Atrogriposis
- Disability class: C6
Medal record
Para table tennis
Representing Chile
Parapan American Games
Gold medal – first place	2011 Guadalajara	Singles C7
Bronze medal – third place	2003 Mar del Plata	Singles C7
Bronze medal – third place	2003 Mar del Plata	Teams C6-7
Bronze medal – third place	2011 Guadalajara	Teams C6-8
Bronze medal – third place	2015 Toronto	Singles C7
Bronze medal – third place	2015 Toronto	Teams C6-8
Bronze medal – third place	2019 Lima	Singles C6
Bronze medal – third place	2023 Santiago	Singles C6
Pan American Championships
Gold medal – first place	2017 San Jose	Teams C6-7
Silver medal – second place	2013 San Jose	Singles C7
Silver medal – second place	2013 San Jose	Teams C6-7
Bronze medal – third place	2003 Brasilia	Singles C7
Bronze medal – third place	2003 Brasilia	Teams C6-7
Bronze medal – third place	2005 Mar del Plata	Teams C6-7
Bronze medal – third place	2017 San Jose	Singles C6

Cristián Ignacio Dettoni Jorquera (born 8 October 1974) is a Chilean para table tennis player who competes internationally. He is a Parapan American Games and Pan American champion, and played at the Paralympic Games three times.
