= Table tennis at the 2007 Parapan American Games =

- Dates: August 13 - August 18

Table tennis was contested at the 2007 Parapan American Games from August 13 to 18 at the Riocentro in Rio de Janeiro, Brazil.

== Participating nations ==
- Argentina (15)
- Brazil (27)
- Canada (8)
- Chile (7)
- Colombia (5)
- Costa Rica (4)
- Cuba (5)
- El Salvador (1)
- Haiti (1)
- Mexico (15)
- Peru (3)
- Puerto Rico (1)
- Uruguay (2)
- United States (9)
- Venezuela (12)

== Medal table ==
Brazil topped the medal table with a total of 26 medals.

Host nation

* Host nation (Brazil)

Rank	Nation	Gold	Silver	Bronze	Total
1	Brazil (BRA)*	11	7	8	26
2	United States (USA)	5	4	2	11
3	Cuba (CUB)	5	2	0	7
4	Mexico (MEX)	2	4	2	8
5	Venezuela (VEN)	1	0	2	3
6	Argentina (ARG)	0	3	5	8
7	Canada (CAN)	0	3	2	5
8	Costa Rica (CRC)	0	1	2	3
9	Colombia (COL)	0	0	1	1
Totals (9 entries)		24	24	24	72

== Medalists ==
=== Men's ===
==== Individual ====
Class	Gold	Silver	Bronze
C1	Isbel Trujillo Yero (CUB)	Yunier Fernández (CUB)	Carlos Maslup (ARG)
C2	Iranildo Espíndola (BRA)	Hemerson Kovalski (BRA)	Leonardo Mariño (ARG)
C3	Luiz Algacir Silva (BRA)	Welder Knaf (BRA)	Jesús Sánchez (MEX)
C4-5	Claudiomiro Segatto (BRA)	Daniel Rodriguez (ARG)	Alexandre Ank (BRA)
C6	Carlo di Franco Michel (BRA)	Domingo Arguello Garcia (CRC)	Luiz Medina (BRA)
C7	Mitchell Seidenfeld (USA)	Cristovan Lima (BRA)	Norman Bass (USA)
C8	Tahl Leibovitz (USA)	Ian Kent (CAN)	Wayne Lo (USA)
C9-10	Erich Manso Salazar (CUB)	Willian Almeida (BRA)	Edmilson Pinheiro (BRA)

==== Team ====
Class	Gold	Silver	Bronze
C1-2	Brazil (BRA); Iranildo Espíndola; Francisco Sales; Hemerson Kovalski	Cuba (CUB); Yunier Fernández; Isbel Trujillo Yero	Venezuela (VEN); Jiovanny Rojas; Jesus Tirado
C3	Brazil (BRA); Jocerlei Silva; Luiz Algacir Silva; Welder Knaf	Mexico (MEX); Eduardo Sánchez; Erasmo Vega; Jesús Sánchez	Venezuela (VEN); Edson Gomez; Roberto Quijada
C4	Brazil (BRA); Ecildo Lopez de Oliveira; Alexandre Ank; Ivanildo Freitas	Mexico (MEX); León Coronado; Jesus Salgueiro	Colombia (COL); Rafael Cristancho; Esteban Guzman
C5	Brazil (BRA); Roberto Alves; Claudiomiro Segatto	United States (USA); Andre Scott; Stuart Caplan	Argentina (ARG); Ricardo Perdiguero; Luis Ferreyra; Daniel Rodriguez
C6-7	United States (USA); Mitchell Seidenfeld; Norman Bass; Edward Levy	Brazil (BRA); Carlo di Franco; Cristovan Lima; Luiz Medina	Costa Rica (CRC); Gerardo Moncada; G. Domingo Arguello
C8	United States (USA); Tahl Leibovitz; Wayne Lo	Canada (CAN); Ian Kent; Masoud Mojtahed	Brazil (BRA); Francisco Melo; João Nascimento Jr.
C9-10	Brazil (BRA); Antônio Mello; Edmilson Pinheiro; Alexandre Caldeira; Willian Almeida	Mexico (MEX); José Luis Vivanco; René Domínguez	Canada (CAN); Martin Pelletier; Réal Poudrier

==== Open ====
Class	Gold	Silver	Bronze
C1-5	Roberto Quijada (VEN)	Daniel Rodriguez (ARG)	Geovanni Rodriguez (CRC)
C6-10	Tahl Leibovitz (USA)	Edmilson Pinheiro (BRA)	Alexandre Caldeira (BRA)

=== Women's ===
==== Individual ====
Class	Gold	Silver	Bronze
C1-3	Yanelis Silva Zamora (CUB)	Pamela Fontaine (USA)	Edith Sigala (MEX)
C4-5	María Paredes (MEX)	Noga Nir-Kistler (USA)	Maria Passos (BRA)
C6-8	Jane Rodrigues (BRA)	Stephanie Chim Hing Chan (CAN)	Giselle Muñoz (ARG)

==== Team ====
Class	Gold	Silver	Bronze
C1-3	Cuba (CUB); Yanelis Silva Zamora; Pastora Hernández	Mexico (MEX); Edith Sigala; Alma Padilla	Brazil (BRA); Carla Azevedo; Rosângela Dalcim
C4-5	Mexico (MEX); María Paredes; Teresa Arenales	United States (USA); Noga Nir-Kistler; Pamela Fontaine	Brazil (BRA); Maria Passos; Sônia Oliveira; Joyce Oliveira

==== Open ====
Class	Gold	Silver	Bronze
C1-5	Yanelis Silva Zamora (CUB)	Sônia Oliveira (BRA)	Marta Makishi (ARG)
C6-10	Jane Rodrigues (BRA)	Giselle Muñoz (ARG)	Stephanie Chim Hing Chan (CAN)
