= Natalia Martyasheva =

Russian para table tennis player

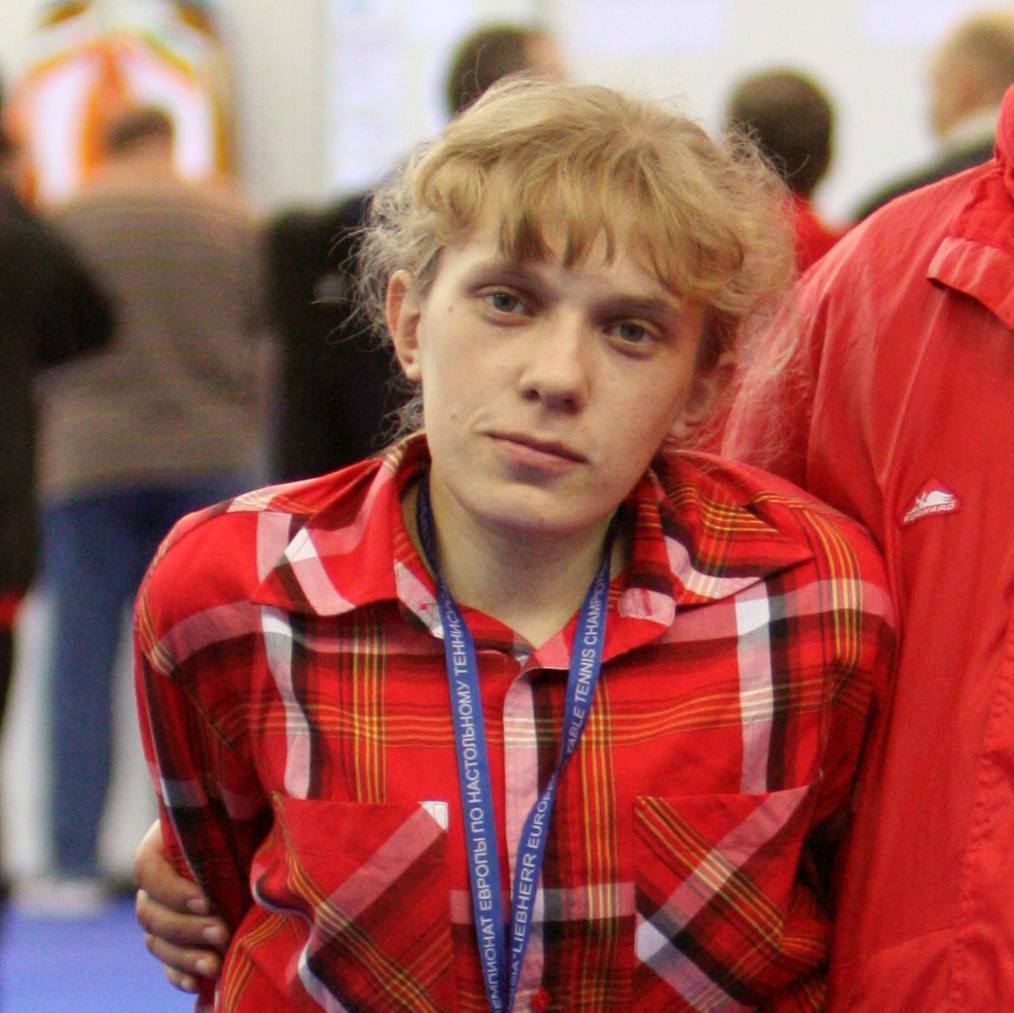

Personal information
- Born: 6 January 1988 Saratov, Soviet Union
- Died: 8 June 2011 (aged 23) Saint Petersburg, Russia

Sport
- Country: Russia
- Sport: Para table tennis
- Disability: Cerebral palsy
- Disability class: C7
Medal record
Para table tennis
Representing Russia
Paralympic Games
Gold medal – first place	2008 Beijing	Women's singles C6-7
European Championships
Silver medal – second place	2007 Kranjska Gora	Women's singles C6-7
Silver medal – second place	2009 Genoa	Women's singles C6-7
Silver medal – second place	2009 Genoa	Women's team C6-8

Natalia Martyasheva or Natalya Martyasheva (6 January 1988 – 8 June 2011) was a Russian para table tennis player who was born with cerebral palsy. She is a Paralympic champion in table tennis in 2008 and a triple European silver medalist.
