= Aloísio Lima =

Brazilian para table tennis player

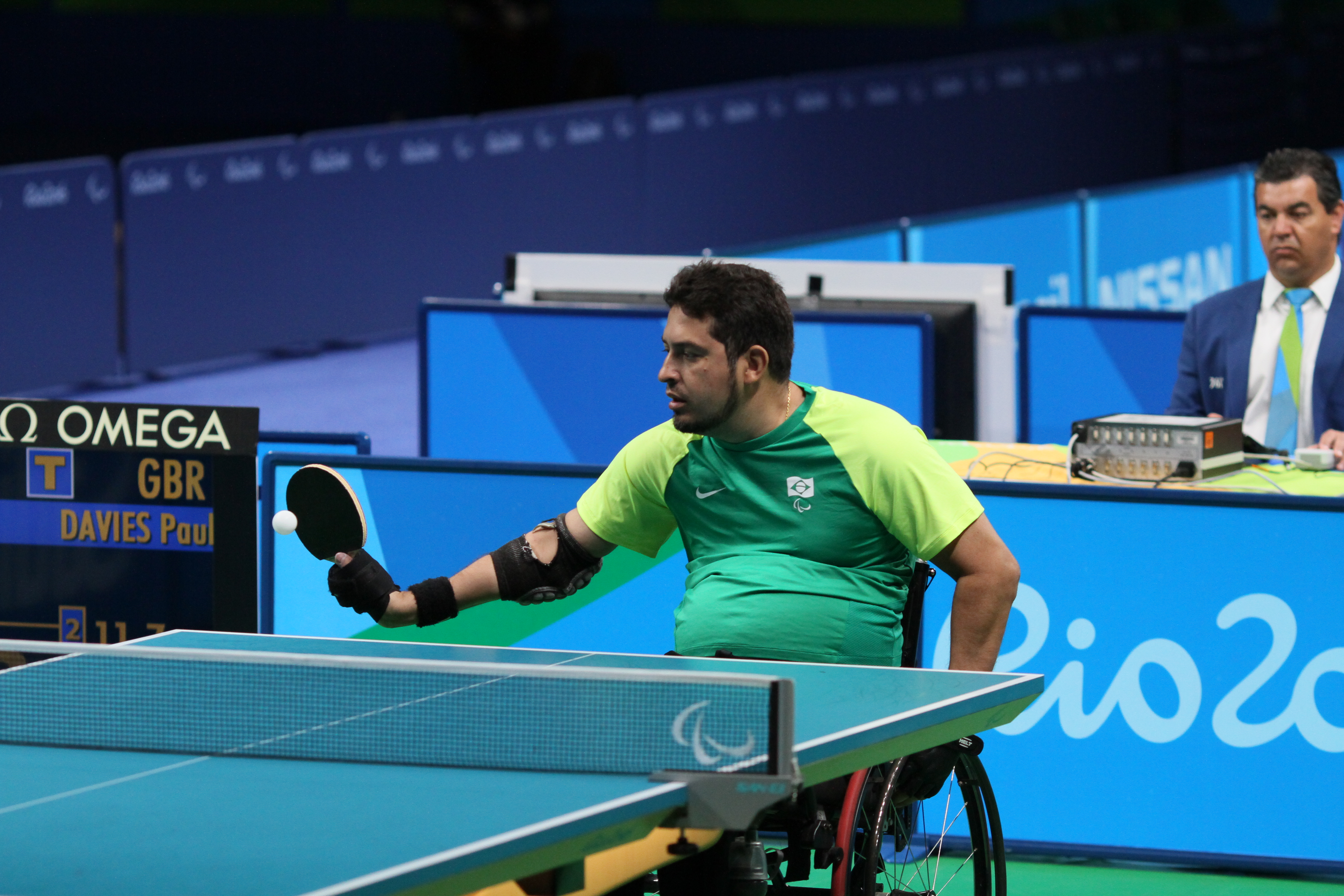

Personal information
- Born: 13 September 1973 (age 52) Brasília, Brazil
- Height: 1.84 m (6 ft 0 in)
- Weight: 80 kg (176 lb)

Sport
- Country: Brazil
- Sport: Para table tennis
- Disability class: C1
Medal record
Para table tennis
Representing Brazil
Paralympic Games
Bronze medal – third place	2016 Rio de Janeiro	Teams C1-2
World Championships
Bronze medal – third place	2014 Beijing	Teams C1
Parapan American Games
Gold medal – first place	2015 Toronto	Singles C1
Gold medal – first place	2019 Lima	Teams C1-2
Silver medal – second place	2019 Lima	Singles C1
Pan American Championships
Silver medal – second place	2013 San Jose	Singles C1
Silver medal – second place	2017 San Jose	Singles C1

Aloísio Lima (born 13 September 1973) is a Brazilian para table tennis player who competes at international table tennis competitions. He is a Paralympic bronze medalist, World bronze medalist, two-time Parapan American Games champion and a two-time Pan American silver medalist.

Lima became quadriplegic following an accident.
