= Ecuador at the 2015 Parapan American Games =

- IOC code: ECU
- NOC: Ecuador Paralympic Association
- Website: http://www.paralympic.org/ecuador

in Toronto 7–15 August 2015
- Competitors: 13 in 5 sports
- Medals Ranked 12th: Gold 1 Silver 0 Bronze 4 Total 5

Parapan American Games appearances
- 1999; 2003; 2007; 2011; 2015; 2019; 2023

Ecuador competed in the 2015 Parapan American Games.

== Competitors ==
The following table lists Ecuador's delegation per sport and gender.

Sport	Men	Women	Total
Athletics	6	0	6
Powerlifting	1	0	1
Swimming	2	1	3
Table tennis	2	0	2
Wheelchair tennis	1	0	1
Total	12	1	13

== Medalists ==
The following competitors from Ecuador won medals at the games. In the by discipline sections below, medalists' names are bolded.

Medal	Name	Sport	Event	Date
Gold	Ronny Mauricio Santos Iza	Athletics	Men's Long Jump T20	August 11
Bronze	Darwin Castro	Athletics	Men's 5000m T11	August 10
Bronze	Stalin David Mosquera	Athletics	Men's Shot Put F20	August 10
Bronze	Paul Polo Astudillo	Table tennis	Men's Singles Class 8	August 10
Bronze	Paul Polo Astudillo; Gabriel Salazar Perez	Table tennis	Men's Team Class 6-8	August 12

**Medals by sport**
**Sport**	1st place, gold medalist(s)	2nd place, silver medalist(s)	3rd place, bronze medalist(s)	**Total**
Athletics	1	0	2	3
Table tennis	0	0	2	2
**Total**	**1**	**0**	**5**	**5**

**Medals by day**
**Day**	1st place, gold medalist(s)	2nd place, silver medalist(s)	3rd place, bronze medalist(s)	**Total**
August 10	0	0	3	3
August 11	1	0	0	1
August 12	0	0	1	1
**Total**	**1**	**0**	**4**	**5**

== Athletics ==
Ecuador sent six male athletes to compete.

Men

Athlete	Event	Final	
Athlete	Event	Time	Rank
**Darwin Castro**	Men's 1500m T11	4:25.81 **PB**	5
**Darwin Castro**	Men's 5000m T11	16:34.91 **PB**	3rd place, bronze medalist(s)
Damian Carcelen	Men's 400m T20	DSQ	
Ronny Mauricio Santos Iza	Men's 400m T20	53.53	5
Sixto Moreta	Men's 1500m T12	4:17.35 **SB**	4
Sixto Moreta	Men's 5000m T12	17:53.92	5
Marlon Matabay	Men's 1500m T20	4:23.54	4

Field events

Athlete	Event	Final	
Athlete	Event	Distance	Position
Damian Carcelen	Men's Long Jump T20	5.94	4
**Ronny Mauricio Santos Iza**	Men's Long Jump T20	6.49 **PR**	1st place, gold medalist(s)
**Stalin David Mosquera**	Men's Shot Put F20	12.74 **PB**	3rd place, bronze medalist(s)

== Powerlifting ==
Ecuador sent one athlete to compete.

== Swimming ==
Ecuador sent two male and one female swimmers to compete.

== Table tennis ==
Ecuador sent two male table tennis players to compete.

== Wheelchair tennis ==
Ecuador sent one male athlete to compete.

Athlete	Event	Round of 32	Round of 16	Quarterfinals	Semifinals	Final / BM	
Athlete	Event	Opposition Score	Opposition Score	Opposition Score	Opposition Score	Opposition Score	Rank
Efrain Cabrera	Men's singles	de la Cruz (CUB); **W** **6**-1,**6**-0	Baldwin (USA); **L** 0-**6**,1-**6**	**Did not advance**			**9th**
