= Giselle Muñoz =

Argentine para table tennis player

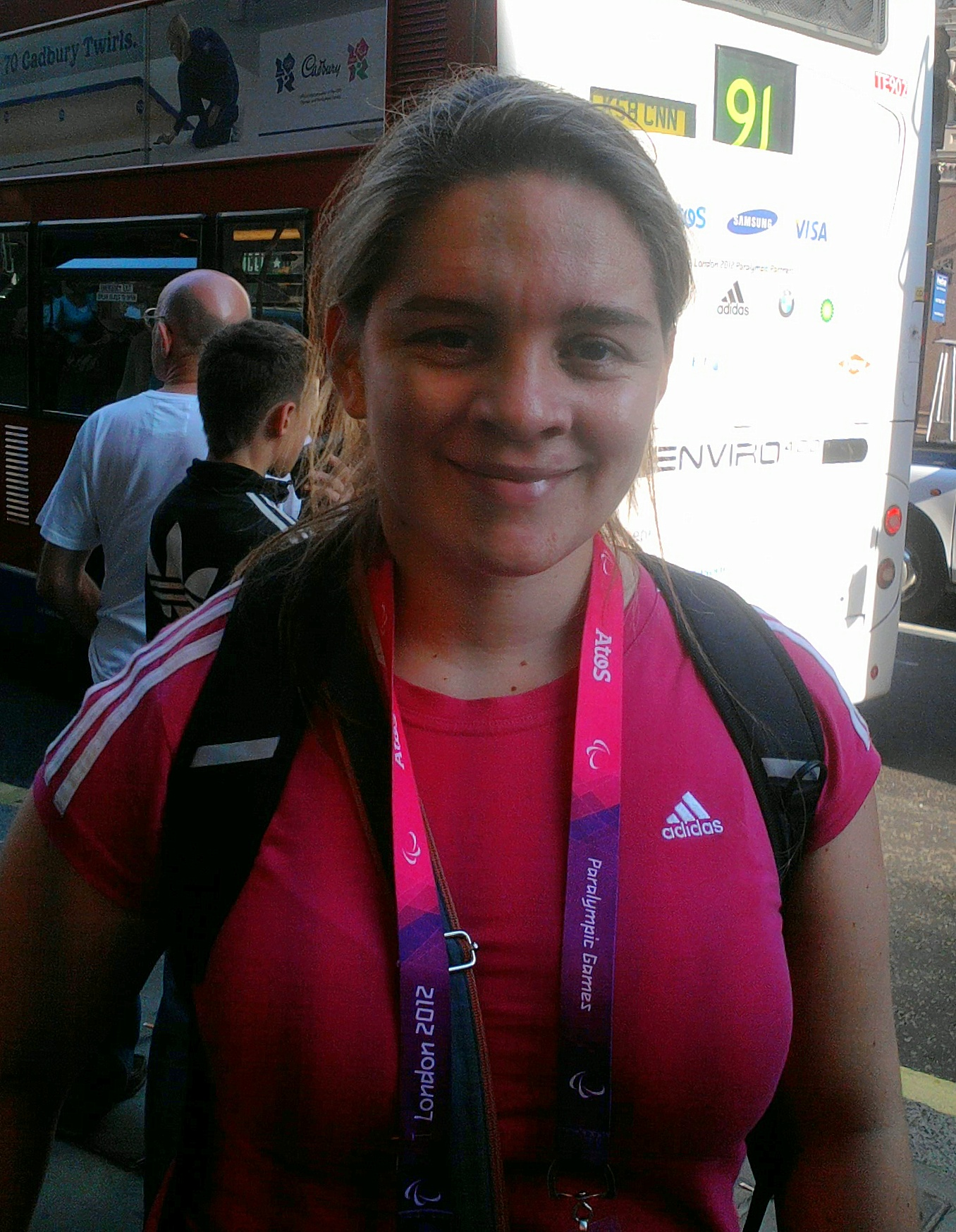
- Munoz at 2012 Summer Paralympics

Personal information
- Full name: Giselle Lucretia Muñoz
- Born: 11 September 1984 (age 41) Buenos Aires, Argentina

Sport
- Country: Argentina
- Sport: Para table tennis
- Disability class: C7
Medal record
Para table tennis
Representing Argentina
Parapan American Games
Silver medal – second place	2007 Rio de Janeiro	Women's open singles
Silver medal – second place	2015 Toronto	Women's singles C6-7
Silver medal – second place	2019 Lima	Women's singles C7
Bronze medal – third place	2007 Rio de Janeiro	Women's singles C6-8
Bronze medal – third place	2011 Guadalajara	Women's singles C7-9
Pan American Championships
Gold medal – first place	2001 Buenos Aires	Women's singles C8
Gold medal – first place	2001 Buenos Aires	Women's open singles
Gold medal – first place	2003 Brasilia	Women's singles C6-8
Gold medal – first place	2003 Brasilia	Women's open singles
Gold medal – first place	2013 San Jose	Women's singles C6-7
Silver medal – second place	2005 Mar del Plata	Women's singles C7
Silver medal – second place	2007 Margarita Island	Women's singles C6-8
Silver medal – second place	2009 Margarita Island	Women's open singles
Silver medal – second place	2009 Margarita Island	Women's singles C6-8
Silver medal – second place	2017 San Jose	Women's singles C7-9
World Championships
Bronze medal – third place	2014 Beijing	Women's singles C7

Giselle Lucretia Muñoz (born 11 September 1984) is an Argentine para table tennis player who competes in international level events. She has participated at the Paralympic Games five times.
