= Kim Seong-ok =

South Korean table tennis player (born 1967)

Personal information
- Born: 27 March 1967 (age 59) Sunchang County, North Jeolla, South Korea
- Height: 155 cm (5 ft 1 in)
- Weight: 51 kg (112 lb)

Sport
- Sport: Table tennis
- Playing style: Left-handed shakehand grip
- Disability class: 7 (formerly 8)
- Highest ranking: 2 (July 2016)
- Current ranking: 5 (February 2020)
Medal record
Women's para table tennis
Representing South Korea
Paralympic Games
Bronze medal – third place	2016 Rio de Janeiro	Singles C7
World Championships
Bronze medal – third place	2018 Lasko	Singles C7
Asian Para Games
Gold medal – first place	2018 Jakarta	Teams C6–7
Silver medal – second place	2014 Incheon	Singles C6–7
Silver medal – second place	2014 Incheon	Teams C6–8
Silver medal – second place	2018 Jakarta	Singles C7
Bronze medal – third place	2022 Hangzhou	Singles C7
Asian Championships
Gold medal – first place	2019 Taichung	Teams C6–7
Silver medal – second place	2019 Taichung	Singles C7
Silver medal – second place	2017 Beijing	Teams C6–7
Silver medal – second place	2015 Amman	Teams C6–10

Korean name
- Hangul: 김성옥
- RR: Gim Seongok
- MR: Kim Sŏngok

Kim Seong-ok (Korean: 김성옥; born 27 March 1967) is a South Korean para table tennis player.

== Career ==
She won a bronze medal at the 2016 Summer Paralympics in the Women's individual Class 7 table tennis competition.

== Personal life ==
She had polio at birth.
