= Kübra Öçsoy Korkut =

Turkish para table tennis player

Kübra Korkut
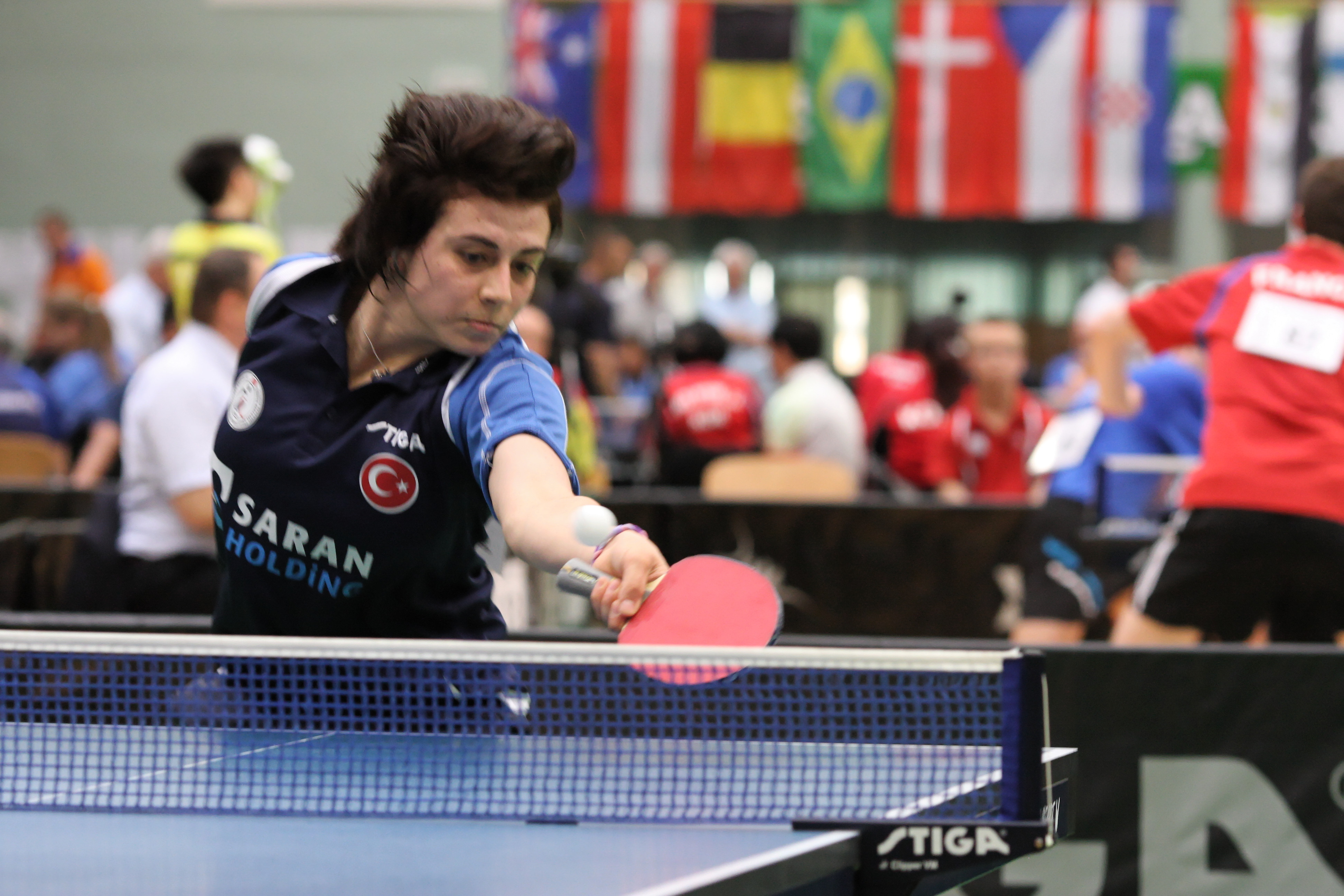
- Kübra Öçsoy @ Slovenia Open 2012

Personal information
- Full name: Kübra Öçsoy Korkut
- Nationality: Turkish
- Born: Kübra Öçsoy; 20 January 1994 (age 32) Sorgun, Yozgat Province, Turkey

Sport
- Country: Turkey
- Sport: Para table tennis
- Club: Emtek Sport Club
- Coached by: Fatih korkut
Medal record
Women's table tennis (class 7)
Representing Turkey
Paralympic Games
Silver medal – second place	2012 London	Team class 6–10
Silver medal – second place	2016 Rio de Janeiro	Individual C7
Silver medal – second place	2024 Paris	Singles C7
Bronze medal – third place	2020 Tokyo	Individual C7
IPC World Championships
Silver medal – second place	2010 South Korea	Individual
Silver medal – second place	2010 South Korea	Team
IPC European Championship
Gold medal – first place	2011 Croatia	Team
Silver medal – second place	2011 Croatia	Individual
Bronze medal – third place	2009 Italy	Team
Bronze medal – third place	2007 Slovenia	Team
- Updated on 8 September 2012

Kübra Öçsoy Korkut, aka Kübra Korkut, (born Kübra Öçsoy, 20 January 1994 in Sorgun, Yozgat Province) is a Turkish para table tennis player of class 7 and Paralympian.

== Career ==
Korkut took part at the 2012 Summer Paralympics competing in the women's individual class 7 event, at which she became 4th after losing 1–3 to her opponent from Ukraine in the bronze medal match. Furthermore, she was part of the Turkish team with her teammate Neslihan Kavas, who became silver medalist in the women's team class 6–10 event after losing to the Chinese team in the final.

She captured the silver medal in the individual C7 event at the 2016 Paralympics in Rio de Janeiro, Brazil.

== Personal life ==
She lost one arm and both legs due to injuries sustained from an electric shock accident, which occurred when she was four years old. At the age of eight, Korkut acquired prosthetic legs. Encouraged by her teachers, she began playing para table tennis.

== Achievements ==
Year	Competition	Venue	Position	Notes
Representing Turkey
2007	IPC European Championship	Slovenia	3rd	team
2009	IPC European Championship	Italy	3rd	team
2009	IPC International Tournament	Hungary	1st	team
2009	IPC International Tournament	Hungary	1st	team
2009	IPC International Tournament	Slovenia	2nd	team
2010	IPC World Championship	South Korea	2nd	individual
2010	IPC World Championship	South Korea	2nd	team
2010	IPC International Tournament	France	3rd	individual
2010	IPC International Tournament	France	1st	team
2011	IPC International Tournament	Slovenia	2nd	individual
2011	IPC European Championship	Croatia	2nd	individual
2011	IPC European Championship	Croatia	1st	team
2012	IPC International Tournament	Slovenia	1st	individual
2012	Summer Paralympics	London, United Kingdom	2nd	team
2016	Summer Paralympics	Rio de Janeiro, Brazil	2nd	Individual
2020	Summer Paralympics	Tokyo, Japan	3rd	Individual
