= Wang Rui (table tennis) =

Chinese para table tennis player

Personal information
- Born: 29 August 1993 (age 32) Deyang, China

Sport
- Country: China
- Sport: Para table tennis
- Disability class: C7
Medal record
Para table tennis
Representing China
Paralympic Games
Gold medal – first place	2021 Tokyo	Teams C6-8
Bronze medal – third place	2024 Paris	Singles WS7
World Championships
Gold medal – first place	2014 Beijing	Teams C6-8
Silver medal – second place	2014 Beijing	Singles C7
Asian Para Games
Gold medal – first place	2014 Incheon	Singles C6-7
Gold medal – first place	2014 Incheon	Teams C6-8
Gold medal – first place	2018 Jakarta	Singles C7
Gold medal – first place	2022 Hangzhou	Singles C7
Bronze medal – third place	2018 Jakarta	Teams C8-10
Asian Championships
Gold medal – first place	2017 Beijing	Singles C6-7
Gold medal – first place	2017 Beijing	Teams C6-8
Gold medal – first place	2019 Taichung	Singles C7
Gold medal – first place	2019 Taichung	Teams C8

Wang Rui (born 29 August 1993) is a Chinese former para table tennis player who competed at international table tennis competitions. She is a Paralympic champion, World champion, three-time Asian Para Games champion and four-time Asian champion in both singles and teams events.

== Life-changing injury ==
In May 2008, Wang was in school studying for her exams. The building shook violently and Wang couldn't react in time as the building collapsed, she was knocked unconscious on the impact of a wall fallen on top of her. Once she regained consciousness, she saw that she was underneath rubble and her right leg was severely injured by the heavy materials. After ten hours of being stuck under the rubble, she was eventually rescued. Once she was retrieved by the volunteers who rescued her, she heard that there had been a major earthquake and Wang was fortunate to survive despite her serious lower body injuries which led to her right leg being amputated.

== Sporting career ==
A year on from the natural disaster, Wang started table tennis training at the age of 16. She participated in her first competition in the Sichuan prefecture and won her first gold medal. Following her incredible success, she joined the Chinese para table tennis team in 2013. Her highest achievement was qualifying and competing at the 2016 Summer Paralympics in Rio de Janeiro, she didn't advance through the group stage following only one win and two losses.

She competed at her second Paralympics Games, the 2020 Summer Paralympics, she was on top of the leaderboard in the group stage and went onto the quarterfinals, she lost in straight sets by Victoriya Safonova. Hope wasn't lost as she had another opportunity of winning a medal in the team events with Mao Jingdian and Huang Wenjuan, the team won their quarterfinal and semifinal matches in straight sets against Germany and France respectively, the Chinese team went on to beat Netherlands and won the title. The victory was Wang and Huang's first title and Mao's fourth gold medal.
