= Kelly van Zon =

Dutch table tennis player

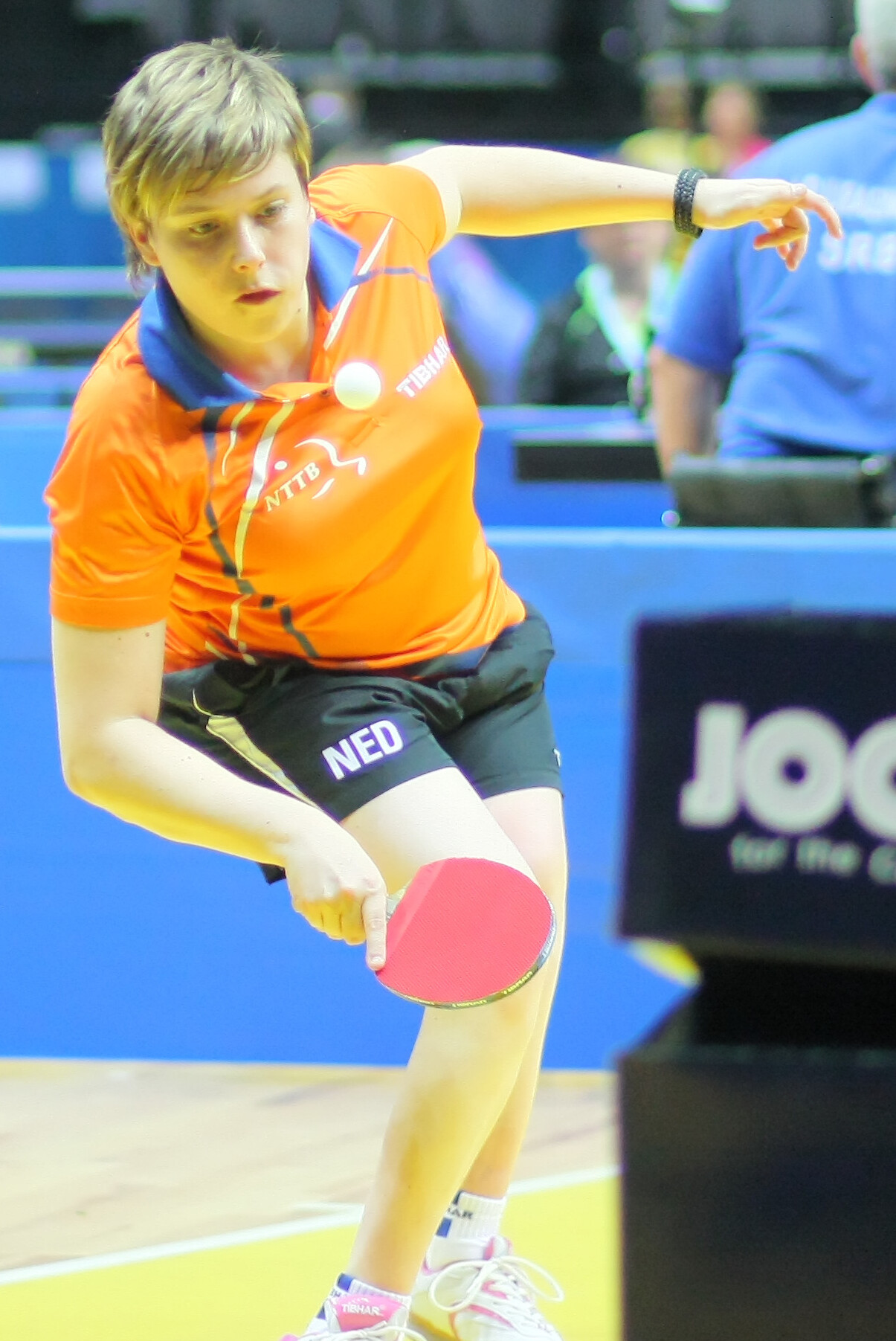
- Kelly van Zon in 2011

Personal information
- Nationality: Netherlands
- Born: 15 September 1987 (age 39) Oosterhout, Netherlands
- Height: 1.53 m (5 ft 0 in)
- Weight: 57 kg (126 lb; 9.0 st)

Sport
- Sport: Table tennis
- Club: TTV SKF, Veenendaal
- Playing style: Shakehand, offensive
- Equipment: TIBHAR
Medal record
Women's table tennis
Representing the Netherlands
Paralympic Games
Gold medal – first place	2012 London	Singles class 7
Gold medal – first place	2016 Rio de Janeiro	Singles class 7
Gold medal – first place	2020 Tokyo	Singles class 7
Gold medal – first place	2024 Paris	Singles Class 7
Silver medal – second place	2020 Tokyo	Team class 6-8
Bronze medal – third place	2008 Beijing	Singles class 6/7
World Championships
Gold medal – first place	2010 Gwangju	Singles class 7
Silver medal – second place	2006 Montreux	Singles class 6/7
European Championships
Gold medal – first place	2009 Genoa	Singles class 6/7
Gold medal – first place	2011 Split	Singles class 7
Silver medal – second place	2005 Liso di Jesolo	Singles class 6/7
Silver medal – second place	2011 Split	Team class 6/7
Bronze medal – third place	2007 Kranjska Gora	Singles 6/7
Bronze medal – third place	2009 Genoa	Team class 6–8

Kelly van Zon (born 15 September 1987 in Oosterhout, Netherlands) is a Dutch table tennis player competing in both disabled and able-bodied competitions. She currently plays for Dutch club TTV SKF in Veenendaal. She competed at the 2020 Summer Paralympics, in Women's individual class 7, winning a gold medal, and in Women's team class 6–8, winning a silver medal.

== Biography ==
Van Zon began playing table tennis at the age of nine at TTV BSM Dongen. She made her international debut at the 2002 Malmö Open in Sweden. Due to a functional disability of her left hip and leg she competes in Class 7 competitions. Besides competing at a top level in table tennis, she studies Marketing and Communication at Johan Cruijff College in Nijmegen, which allows her to successfully combine sport and studies. Van Zon's old club in Dongen named their practice hall after her, the Kelly Van Zon Sportszaal.

By winning the title at the 2011 European Championships in Split, Croatia, she qualified directly for the London 2012 Paralympics. At those Paralympic Games, she won gold by defeating the Russian Yulia Ovsyannikova. In 2016, she added to her Paralympic titles by winning the final and defeating the Turkish Kubra Korkut.

Van Zon was strongly tipped for the delayed 2020 Summer Paralympics.

== Career records ==
=== Paralympic Games ===
(bronze) 2008 Beijing, China: Women's Singles Class 6/7

(gold) 2012 London, England: Women's Singles Class 7

(gold) 2016 Rio de Janeiro, Brazil: Women's Singles Class 7

(gold) 2020 Tokyo, Japan: Women's Singles Class 7

(silver) 2020 Tokyo, Japan: Women's Team Class 6–8

(gold) 2024 Paris, France: Women's Singles Class 7

=== World Championships ===
(silver) 2006 Montreux, Switzerland: Women's Singles Class 6/7

(gold) 2010 Gwangju, Korea: Women's Singles Class 7

=== European Championships ===
(silver) 2005 Liso di Jeolo, Italy: Women's Singles Class 6/7

(bronze) 2007 Kranjska Gora, Slovenia: Women's Singles Class 6/7

(gold) 2009 European Championships, Genoa: Women's Singles Class 6/7

(bronze) 2009 Genoa, Italy: Women's Team Class 6–8

(gold) 2011 European Championships, Split: Women's Singles Class 7

(silver) 2011 Split, Croatia: Women's Team Class 6/7
