= Anne Barnéoud =

French para table tennis player

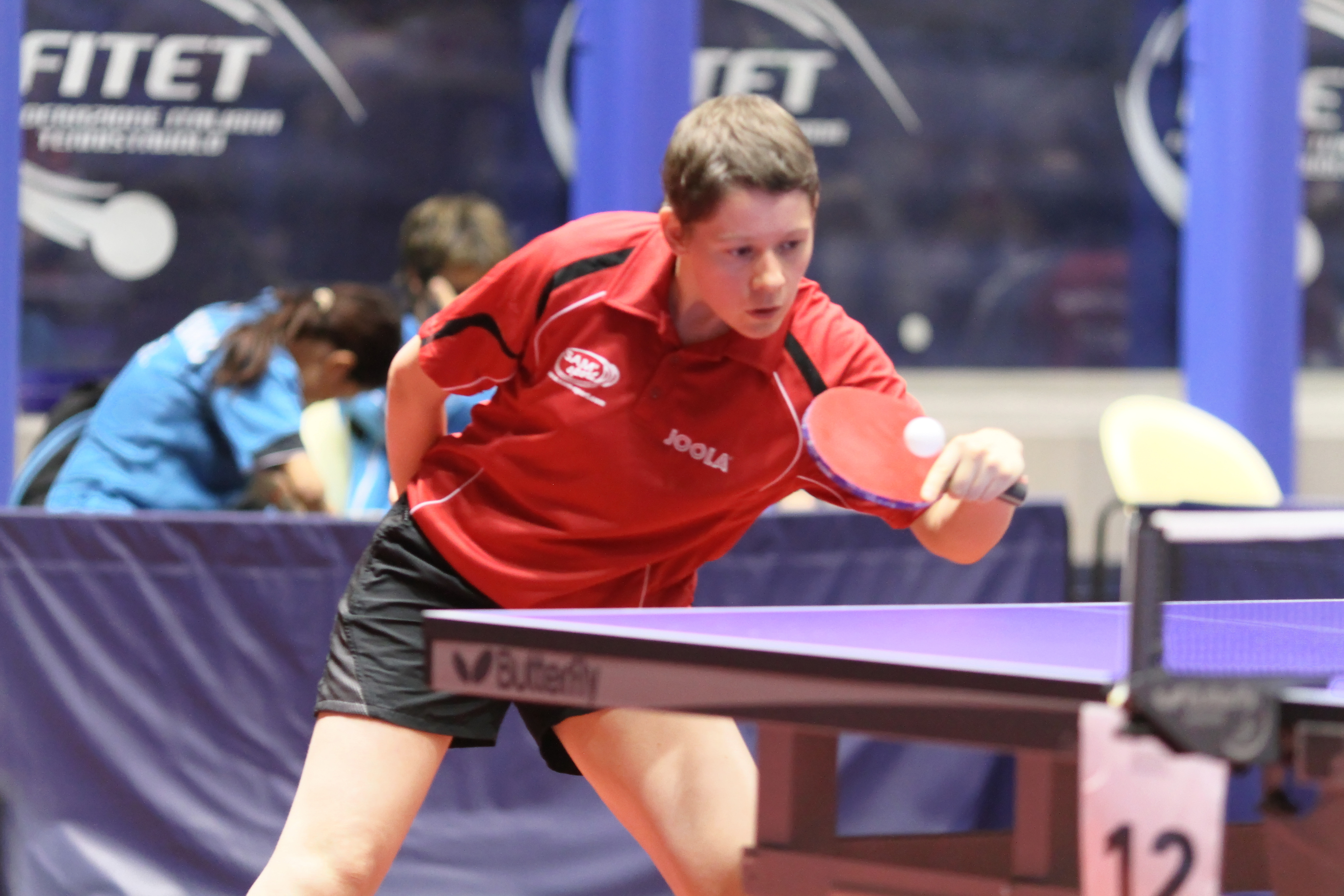
- Anne Barnéoud in November 2013

Personal information
- Nickname: Nanou
- Born: 31 October 1983 (age 42) Saint-Martin-d'Hères, France
- Height: 160 cm (5 ft 3 in)

Sport
- Country: France
- Sport: Para table tennis
- Disability: Hemiplegia, aphasia
- Disability class: C7
- Coached by: Vinz Trinquier
Medal record
Para table tennis
Representing France
Paralympic Games
Bronze medal – third place	2008 Beijing	Women's team C6-10
World Championships
Bronze medal – third place	2014 Beijing	Women's singles C7
Bronze medal – third place	2014 Beijing	Women's teams C6-8
Bronze medal – third place	2018 Lasko	Women's singles C7
European Championships
Gold medal – first place	2009 Genoa	Women's teams C6-8
Gold medal – first place	2013 Lignano	Women's teams C6-8
Silver medal – second place	2011 Split	Women's teams C8
Silver medal – second place	2015 Vejle	Women's singles C7
Silver medal – second place	2017 Lasko	Women's teams C6-8
Bronze medal – third place	2013 Lignano	Women's singles C7
Bronze medal – third place	2015 Vejle	Women's teams C6-8
Bronze medal – third place	2019 Helsingborg	Women's singles C7

Anne Barnéoud (born 31 October 1983) is a French para table tennis player who competes in international level events. She is a three time World bronze medalist, double European team champion, she has won multiple medals in team events with Thu Kamkasomphou. She works as a police commissioner.
