= 2007 Parapan American Games =

3rd edition of the Parapan American Games

III Parapan American Games
- Host: Rio de Janeiro, Brazil
- Motto: Live this energy! Portuguese: Viva essa energia!
- Nations: 25
- Athletes: 1,115
- Events: 254 in 10 sports
- Opening: August 12
- Closing: August 19
- Opened by: Sérgio Cabral Filho
- Main venue: Rio Olympic Arena

The 2007 Parapan American Games, officially the III Parapan American Games, were a major international multi-sport event for athletes with disabilities, celebrated in the tradition of the Parapan American Games as governed by the Americas Paralympic Committee, held from August 12 to 19, 2007 in Rio de Janeiro, Brazil. Organized by the Rio de Janeiro Organizing Committee (CO-Rio 2007) and the Brazilian Paralympic Committee (CPB), it marked the first time that the Parapan American Games were staged in the same city and followed directly after the Pan American Games.

== Bidding process ==
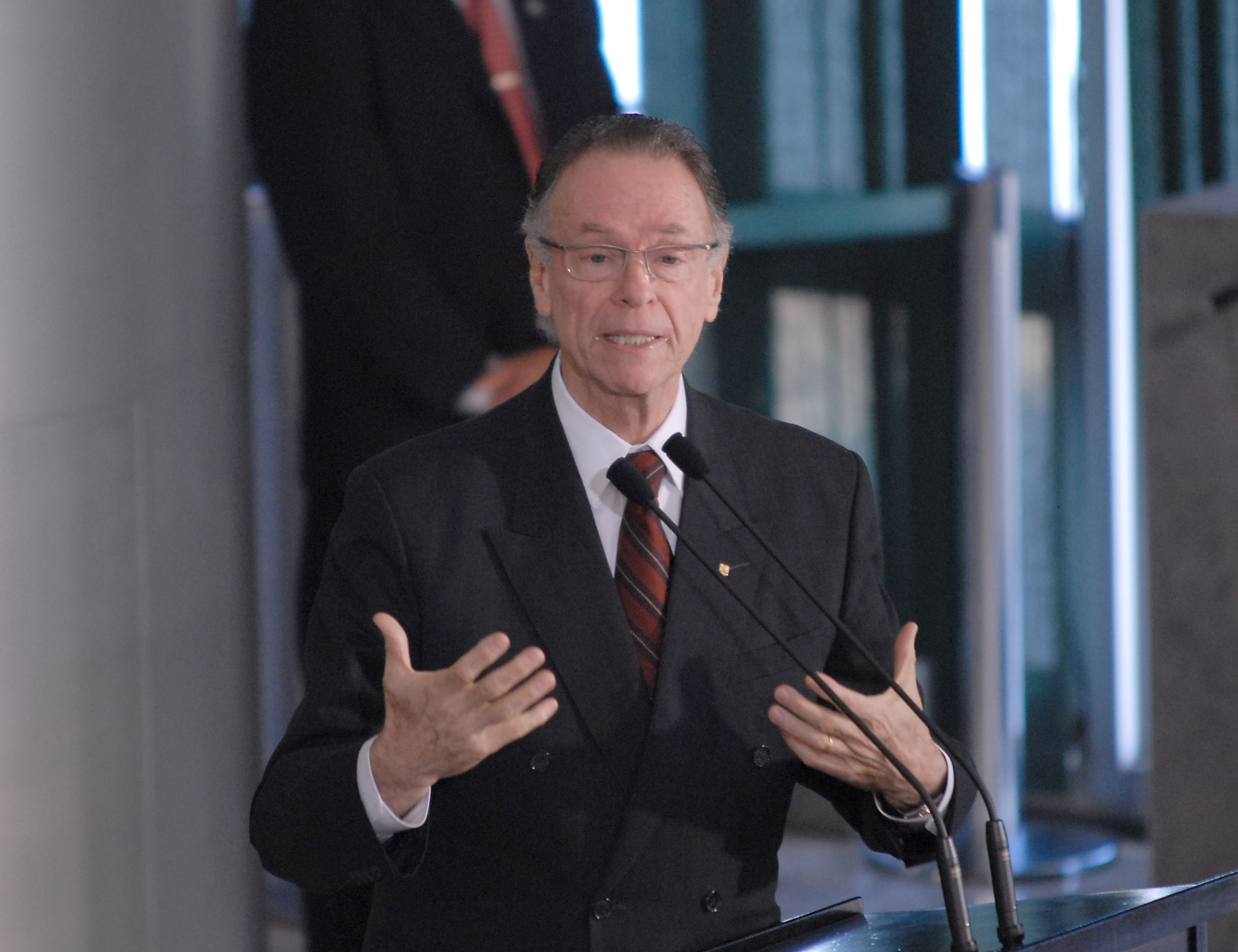
Carlos Arthur Nuzman, chairman of the Rio de Janeiro bid for the 2007 Pan American Games.

The official bid was submitted in August 2001 during the XXXIX Pan American Sports Organization (PASO) General Assembly held in Santo Domingo, Dominican Republic. In April 2002, following delivery of Federal, State and City Government and BOC letters confirming country, state, city and Brazilian sport compliance with the applicable Games regulations, PASO announced the approval of Rio de Janeiro’s bid. The Bidding Committee then submitted a detailed bid file for the Games. The document was prepared and developed with the assistance of Fundação Getúlio Vargas (FGV), which had been commissioned by Rio de Janeiro's City Government. In the running to host the 2007 Pan American Games, Rio de Janeiro faced off with the city of San Antonio, United States; which previously beat Houston, Miami, and Raleigh to become the American candidate.

According to PASO statute and regulations, the host city was selected by direct voting during the XL PASO General Assembly held in Mexico City, Mexico, on August 24, 2002. The candidate city that received the simple majority of votes from representatives of the 42 member National Olympic Committees (NOCs) would be awarded the right to host the competition. The announcement was made by PASO President Mario Vázquez Raña. Rio de Janeiro received 30 votes against 21 from San Antonio. Marked by a professional strategy that included the showing of city and project videos, Rio de Janeiro's campaign convinced the majority of voters, accounting for a total 51 votes. The 39-member Brazilian delegation erupted into boisterous celebration celebrating the country's highest achievement in terms of sporting event organization.

== Torch Relay ==
The 2007 Parapan American Torch Relay introduced the first torch relay in the history of the Parapan American Games. It took place on August 11, 2007 and lasted only one day. The route spanned a total of 20 kilometers.

== The Games ==
=== Participating nations ===
25 nations competed at the Games.

- Argentina
- Barbados
- Brazil
- Canada
- Chile
- Colombia
- Costa Rica
- Cuba
- Dominican Republic
- Ecuador
- El Salvador
- Guatemala
- Haiti
- Honduras
- Jamaica
- Mexico
- Nicaragua
- Panama
- Paraguay
- Peru
- Puerto Rico
- Suriname
- United States
- Uruguay
- Venezuela

=== Sports ===
- Athletics (83)
- Football 5-a-side (1)
- Football 7-a-side (1)
- Judo
- Powerlifting
- Sitting volleyball (2)
- Swimming
- Table tennis (24)
- Wheelchair basketball (2)
- Wheelchair tennis

=== Calendar ===
OC	Opening ceremony	Event competitions	Event finals	CC	Closing ceremony

August	12 Sun	13 Mon	14 Tue	15 Wed	16 Thu	17 Fri	18 Sat	19 Sun
Ceremonies	OC							CC
Athletics								
Football 5-a-side								
Football 7-a-side								
Judo								
Powerlifting								
Swimming								
Sitting volleyball								
Table tennis								
Wheelchair basketball								
Wheelchair tennis								
August	12 Sun	13 Mon	14 Tue	15 Wed	16 Thu	17 Fri	18 Sat	19 Sun

=== Medal table ===
* Host nation (Brazil)

Rank	Nation	Gold	Silver	Bronze	Total
1	Brazil (BRA)*	93	68	77	238
2	Canada (CAN)	49	37	26	112
3	United States (USA)	38	44	36	118
4	Mexico (MEX)	37	43	37	117
5	Cuba (CUB)	28	21	11	60
6	Argentina (ARG)	17	16	30	63
7	Venezuela (VEN)	5	10	15	30
8	Peru (PER)	3	1	0	4
9	Colombia (COL)	2	6	9	17
10	Jamaica (JAM)	1	2	2	5
11	Puerto Rico (PUR)	1	1	2	4
12	Ecuador (ECU)	1	0	2	3
13	Costa Rica (CRC)	0	1	2	3
14	Chile (CHI)	0	1	1	2
15	Panama (PAN)	0	1	0	1
15	Uruguay (URU)	0	1	0	1
17	El Salvador (ESA)	0	0	1	1
17	Paraguay (PAR)	0	0	1	1
Totals (18 entries)		275	253	252	780

== See also ==
- 2007 Pan American Games
- 2016 Summer Paralympics
