= Pan-American Para Table Tennis Championships =

Pan-American Para Table Tennis Championships is a quadrennial sports event for para table tennis players who represent a North, Central or South American country. It started in 1995, there was a six year break then in 2001, it became a biennial event, after 2005, it became a quadrennial event. This event occurs one year before the Parapan American Games as a qualifying tournament.

== Locations ==
| Edition | Year | Host | Dates | Competitors | Countries | Top medalists | Ref |
|---|---|---|---|---|---|---|---|
| - | 1995 | (Argentina) Mar del Plata | 7 November | 63 | 9 | | |
| 1 | 2001 | (Argentina) Buenos Aires | 1–9 November | 106 | 8 | Mexico | |
| 2 | 2003 | (Brazil) Brasília | 14–22 November | 107 | 9 | Mexico | |
| 3 | 2005 | (Argentina) Mar del Plata | 16–23 July | 115 | 9 | Brazil | |
| 4 | 2009 | (Venezuela) Margarita Island | 27 September – 4 October | 102 | 10 | Brazil | |
| 5 | 2013 | (Costa Rica) San José | 9–15 December | 109 | 11 | Brazil | |
| 6 | 2017 | (Costa Rica) San José | 28 November – 4 December | 119 | 13 | Brazil | |
| 7 | 2025 | (Brazil) São Paulo | 9–12 October | 138 | 11 | Brazil | |

== All-time medal count ==
As of 2025.

| Rank | Nation | Gold | Silver | Bronze | Total |
|---|---|---|---|---|---|
| 1 | Brazil (BRA) | 65 | 68 | 69 | 202 |
| 2 | Mexico (MEX) | 30 | 19 | 20 | 69 |
| 3 | United States (USA) | 23 | 17 | 25 | 65 |
| 4 | Argentina (ARG) | 20 | 31 | 42 | 93 |
| 5 | Chile (CHI) | 11 | 14 | 29 | 54 |
| 6 | Canada (CAN) | 4 | 1 | 11 | 16 |
| 7 | Cuba (CUB) | 4 | 1 | 2 | 7 |
| 8 | Costa Rica (CRC) | 2 | 3 | 5 | 10 |
| 9 | Venezuela (VEN) | 1 | 2 | 8 | 11 |
| 10 | Colombia (COL) | 0 | 3 | 10 | 13 |
| 11 | Ecuador (ECU) | 0 | 0 | 1 | 1 |
| 11 | Uruguay (URU) | 0 | 0 | 1 | 1 |
| Totals (12 entries) | | 160 | 159 | 223 | 542 |

== See also ==
- Pan American Table Tennis Championships
- Latin American Table Tennis Championships
- North American Table Tennis Championships
