= Peru at the 2023 Parapan American Games =

- Flag of Peru
- IPC code: PER
- NPC: Peruvian Paralympic Committee
- Website: www.paralympic.org/peru

in Santiago, Chile 17 November 2023 – 26 November 2023
- Competitors: 89 in 15 sports
- Flag bearers: Carlos Enrique Felipa; Pilar Jáuregui
- Medals Ranked 11th: Gold 6 Silver 9 Bronze 19 Total 34

Parapan American Games appearances
- 1999; 2003; 2007; 2011; 2015; 2019; 2023

Peru competed in the 2023 Parapan American Games in Santiago, Chile from 17 November to 26 November 2023. This was Peru's seventh appearance at the Parapan American Games, having competed at every edition of the games since the inaugural edition in 1999.

Paralympic athlete Carlos Enrique Felipa and para badminton athlete Pilar Jáuregui were the country's flagbearers during the opening ceremony.

== Medalists ==
The following Peruvian competitors won medals at the games. In the by discipline sections below, medalists' names are bolded.

Medal	Name	Sport	Event	Date
Gold	Daniela Campos	Archery	Women's individual recurve open	November 22
Gold	Leonor Espinoza	Taekwondo	Women's 47 kg	November 23
Gold	Pilar Jáuregui; Jaquelin Burgos	Badminton	Women's doubles WH1–WH2	November 24
Gold	Pedro Pablo de Vinatea	Badminton	Men's singles SL3	November 26
Gold	Pilar Jáuregui	Badminton	Women's singles WH2	November 26
Gold	Giuliana Póveda	Badminton	Women's singles SH6	November 26
Silver	Milagros Palomino	Shooting	R3 Mixed 10 metre air rifle prone SH1	November 18
Silver	Jorge Arcela	Shooting	R1/R2 Mixed 10 metre air rifle standing SH1	November 20
Silver	Rosbil Guillen	Athletics	Men's 5000 metres T11	November 21
Silver	Jesús Castillo	Athletics	Men's 200 metres T64	November 22
Silver	Rosbil Guillen	Athletics	Men's 1500 metres T11	November 25
Silver	Diana Rojas	Badminton	Women's singles SU5	November 25
Silver	Nilton Quispe; Giuliana Póveda	Badminton	Mixed doubles SH6	November 25
Silver	Dean Acosta; Niurka Callupe	Boccia	Mixed pairs BC3	November 25
Silver	Jaquelin Burgos	Badminton	Women's singles WH1	November 26
Bronze	Niel Garcia Trelles	Powerlifting	Men's 59 kg	November 18
Bronze	Jorge Arcela	Shooting	R3 Mixed 10 metre air rifle prone SH1	November 18
Bronze	Milagros Palomino	Shooting	R1/R2 Mixed 10 metre air rifle standing SH1	November 20
Bronze	Rodrigo Santillan	Swimming	Men's 100 metre backstroke S2	November 20
Bronze	Rodrigo Santillan	Swimming	Men's 200 metre freestyle S2	November 21
Bronze	José Silva	Swimming	Men's 50 metre backstroke S3	November 21
Bronze	Niurka Callupe	Boccia	Women's individual BC3	November 22
Bronze	Carlos Enrique Felipa	Athletics	Men's shot put F63	November 23
Bronze	Kenny Pacheco	Athletics	Men's discus throw F56	November 23
Bronze	Jesús Salva; Rubí Fernández	Badminton	Mixed doubles SH6	November 24
Bronze	Rodrigo Santillan	Swimming	Men's 100 metre freestyle S2	November 24
Bronze	Jairo Aranguri	Badminton	Men's singles SU5	November 25
Bronze	Kelly Ari	Badminton	Women's singles SU5	November 25
Bronze	Roberth Fajardo; Fernando Vilcachagua	Badminton	Men's doubles WH1–WH2	November 25
Bronze	Gerson Vargas	Badminton	Men's singles SL3	November 26
Bronze	Nilton Quispe	Badminton	Men's singles SH6	November 26
Bronze	Denith Silva	Badminton	Women's singles WH2	November 26
Bronze	Rubí Fernández	Badminton	Women's singles SH6	November 26
Bronze	Renzo Bances; Jenny Ventocilla	Badminton	Mixed doubles SL3–SU5	November 26

Medals by sport/discipline
Sport	1st place, gold medalist(s)	2nd place, silver medalist(s)	3rd place, bronze medalist(s)	Total
Badminton	4	3	9	**16**
Archery	1	0	0	**1**
Taekwondo	1	0	0	**1**
Athletics	0	3	2	**5**
Shooting	0	2	2	**4**
Boccia	0	1	1	**2**
Swimming	0	0	4	**4**
Powerlifting	0	0	1	**1**
**Total**	**6**	**9**	**19**	**34**

Medals by day
Day	1st place, gold medalist(s)	2nd place, silver medalist(s)	3rd place, bronze medalist(s)	Total
18 November	0	1	2	3
19 November	0	0	0	0
20 November	0	1	2	3
21 November	0	1	2	3
22 November	1	1	1	3
23 November	1	0	2	3
24 November	1	0	2	3
25 November	0	4	3	7
26 November	3	1	5	9
**Total**	**6**	**9**	**19**	**34**

Medals by gender
**Gender**	1st place, gold medalist(s)	2nd place, silver medalist(s)	3rd place, bronze medalist(s)	**Total**
Male	1	3	11	15
Female	5	2	4	11
Mixed	0	4	4	8
**Total**	**4**	**5**	**3**	**12**

== Competitors ==
The following is the list of number of competitors (per gender) participating at the games per sport/discipline.

Sport	Men	Women	Total
Archery	1	2	3
Athletics	7	3	10
Badminton	11	10	21
Boccia	2	3	5
Cycling	2	0	2
Football 5-a-side	10	—N/a	10
Goalball	0	5	5
Judo	1	0	1
Powerlifting	1	0	1
Shooting	2	1	3
Swimming	5	3	8
Table tennis	2	0	2
Taekwondo	1	2	3
Wheelchair basketball	0	12	12
Wheelchair tennis	2	1	3
Total	47	42	89

== Archery ==
Men

Athlete	Event	Ranking Round		Round of 16	Quarterfinals	Semifinals	Final / BM	
Athlete	Event	Score	Seed	Opposition Score	Opposition Score	Opposition Score	Opposition Score	Rank
Marco Huaytalla	Individual recurve open	523	8	Figueroa (DOM); W 6–2	Molina (MEX); L 2–6	Did not advance		

Women

Athlete	Event	Ranking Round		Round of 16	Quarterfinals	Semifinals	Final / BM	
Athlete	Event	Score	Seed	Opposition Score	Opposition Score	Opposition Score	Opposition Score	Rank
Daniela Campos	Individual recurve open	489	3	—N/a	Figueiredo (BRA); W 6–2	Rocha (MEX); W 6–4	Daza (COL); W 6–0	1st place, gold medalist(s)
Maleny Martinez	Individual compound open	601	9	Wallace (USA); L 117–131	Did not advance			

Mixed

Athlete	Event	Ranking Round		Quarterfinals	Semifinals	Final / BM	
Athlete	Event	Score	Seed	Opposition Score	Opposition Score	Opposition Score	Rank
Marco Huaytalla; Daniela Campos	Team recurve open	1012	4	Brazil; W 5–4	Colombia; L 0–6	Bronze medal final Mexico; L 0–6	4

== Athletics ==
Key

- Note–Ranks given for track events are within the athlete's heat only
- Q = Qualified for the next round
- q = Qualified for the next round as a fastest loser
- N/A = Round not applicable for the event
- Bye = Athlete not required to compete in round

Men

Track events

Athlete	Event	Semifinal		Final	
Athlete	Event	Result	Rank	Result	Rank
Jesús Castillo	100 m T64	—N/a		11.81	4
Jesús Castillo	200 m T64	—N/a		24.09	2nd place, silver medalist(s)
Rosbil Guillen	1500 m T11	4:17.70	2 Q	4:15.41	2nd place, silver medalist(s)
Carlos Sangama	1500 m T46	—N/a		4:27.60	7
Efrain Sotacuro	1500 m T46	—N/a		4:21.30	5
Rosbil Guillen	5000 m T11	—N/a		15:28.52	2nd place, silver medalist(s)

Field events

Athlete	Event	Final	
Athlete	Event	Distance	Position
Ivanhoe Renzo Lazaro	Shot put F11	9.84	5
Kenny Pacheco	Shot put F55	8.88	5
Carlos Enrique Felipa	Shot put F63	10.61	3rd place, bronze medalist(s)
Ivanhoe Renzo Lazaro	Discus throw F11	23.75	7
Kenny Pacheco	Discus throw F56	35.93	3rd place, bronze medalist(s)

Women

Track events

Athlete	Event	Semifinal		Final	
Athlete	Event	Result	Rank	Result	Rank
Shirley Melendez	100 m T64	—N/a		16.66	6
Yeny Vargas	200 m T47	29.67	5	Did not advance	
Yeny Vargas	400 m T47	1:04.74	3 Q	1:06.00	7

Field events

Athlete	Event	Final	
Athlete	Event	Distance	Position
Mariana Jimena Calcagno	Shot put F57	6.08	6
Mariana Jimena Calcagno	Discus throw F57	21.24	5

== Badminton ==
Men

Athlete	Event	Preliminaries				Quarterfinals	Semifinals	Final / BM	
Athlete	Event	Opposition Result	Opposition Result	Opposition Result	Rank	Opposition Result	Opposition Result	Opposition Result	Rank
Ronald Stalin Montero	Singles WH1	Quevedo (MEX); W 21–9, 21–5	Cano (BRA); L 14–21, 15–21	—N/a	2 Q	Bilenki (CAN); L 21–18, 18–21, 17–21	Did not advance		
Fernando Vilcachagua	Singles WH1	Diaz (ARG); W 21–6, 21–9	Conceição (BRA); L 3–21, 8–21	—N/a	2 Q	Dominguez (COL); L 20–22, 21–16, 15–21	Did not advance		
Roberth Fajardo	Singles WH2	Barbosa (BRA); W 21–14, 21–17	Chaves (BRA); L 19–21, 16–21	Aránguiz (CHI); L 5–21, 8–21	3	Did not advance			
Albert Puente	Singles SL3	Mercedes (DOM); W 21–17, 21–8	Echeverría (CHI); W 21–4, 21–5	—N/a	1 Q	Vargas (PER); L 11–21, 10–21	Did not advance		
Gerson Vargas	Singles SL3	Bello (CUB); W 21–16, 21–17	Vinatea (PER); L 17–21, 18–21	—N/a	2 Q	Puente (PER); W 21–11, 21–10	Vinatea (PER); L 16–21, 13–21	Bronze medal final Cardoso (BRA); L 21–10, 21–9	3rd place, bronze medalist(s)
Pedro Pablo de Vinatea	Singles SL3	Bello (CUB); W 21–18, 21–14	Vargas (PER); W 21–17, 21–18	—N/a	1 Q	Bye	Vargas (PER); W 21–16, 21–13	Roussy (CAN); W 11–21, 21–18, 21–15	1st place, gold medalist(s)
Renzo Bances	Singles SL4	Anguiano (GUA); W 21–15, 23–21	Ávila (MEX); L 19–21, 12–21	—N/a	2	Did not advance			
Jairo Aranguri	Singles SU5	Vargas (COL); W 21–17, 21–15	Rodrigues (BRA); L 17–21, 17–21	—N/a	2 Q	—N/a	Pargas (CUB); L 21–18, 17–21, 16–21	Bronze medal final Cadenillas (PER); W 21–17, 23–21	3rd place, bronze medalist(s)
Alberto Cadenillas	Singles SU5	Oliveira (BRA); W 21–17, 21–11	Pargas (CUB); L 17–21, 13–21	—N/a	2 Q	—N/a	Rodrigues (BRA); L 18–21, 20–22	Bronze medal final Aranguri (PER); L 17–21, 21–23	4
Nilton Quispe	Singles SH6	Costa (BRA); W 21–14, 21–8	Tavares (BRA); L 8–21, 9–21	—N/a	2 Q	Dalmau (CUB); W 21–7, 21–8	Krajewski (USA); L 6–21, 19–21	Bronze medal final Salva (PER); W 21–8, 21–8	3rd place, bronze medalist(s)
Jesús Salva	Singles SH6	Castillo (MEX); W 21–15, 21–19	Kendrick (CAN); W 22–20, 21–15	Dalmau (CUB); W 22–20, 21–18	1 Q	Lightfoot (CAN); W 21–17, 19–21, 21–11	Tavares (BRA); L 6–21, 8–21	Bronze medal final Quispe (PER); L 8–21, 8–21	4
Roberth Fajardo; Fernando Vilcachagua	Doubles WH1–WH2	Diaz / Robledo (ARG); W 21–13, 21–15	Godoy / Conceição (BRA); L 9–21, 4–21	—N/a	2 Q	—N/a	Barbosa / Cano (BRA); L 17–21, 17–21	Bronze medal final Bilenki / Lapointe (CAN); W 21–16, 21–11	3rd place, bronze medalist(s)

Women

Athlete	Event	Preliminaries				Semifinals	Final / BM	
Athlete	Event	Opposition Result	Opposition Result	Opposition Result	Rank	Opposition Result	Opposition Result	Rank
Jaquelin Burgos	Singles WH1	Gomes (BRA); W 21–13, 21–11	Evangelista (BRA); W 21–13, 22–20	Chokyu (CAN); L 13–21, 16–21	2 Q	Chokyu (CAN); W 23–21, 19–21, 21–14	Souza (BRA); L 13–21, 13–21	2nd place, silver medalist(s)
Pilar Jáuregui	Singles WH2	Zapata (CHI); W 21–0, 21–5	Vicente (ARG); W 21–4, 21–6	—N/a	1 Q	Vicente (ARG); W 21–5, 21–4	Antunes (BRA); W 21–4, 21–2	1st place, gold medalist(s)
Denith Silva	Singles WH2	Cabral (BRA); W 21–11, 21–10	Antunes (BRA); L 21–11, 18–21, 14–21	—N/a	2 Q	Antunes (BRA); L 14–21, 21–13, 9–21	Bronze medal final Vicente (ARG); W 21–6, 21–4	3rd place, bronze medalist(s)
Flor Arequipeño	Singles SL3	Ávila (BRA); L 13–21, 11–21	Sierra (COL); W 21–14, 18–21, 21–7	Rojas (MEX); L 21–19, 10–21, 18–21	3	Did not advance		
Jenny Ventocilla	Singles SL4	Carvalho (BRA); W 21–3, 21–3	Reis (BRA); L 15–21, 14–21	—N/a	2 Q	Oliveira (BRA); L 16–21, 21–11, 11–21	Bronze medal final Meier (CAN); L 13–21, 18–21	4
Kelly Ari	Singles SU5	Arriagada (CHI); W 21–7, 21–7	Dias (BRA); W 21–19, 18–21, 21–19	Llanes (CUB); W 21–12, 22–20	1 Q	Almeida (BRA); L 3–21, 5–21	Bronze medal final Dias (BRA); W 22–20, 23–21	3rd place, bronze medalist(s)
Diana Rojas	Singles SU5	Fernandes (BRA); W 21–9, 21–11	Almeida (BRA); W 9–21, 23–21, 21–14	Caimanque (CHI); W 21–1, 21–1	1 Q	Dias (BRA); W 21–10, 21–16	Almeida (BRA); L 14–21, 17–21	2nd place, silver medalist(s)
Rubí Fernández	Singles SH6	Reis (BRA); W 21–4, 21–4	Simon (USA); L 21–23, 16–21	Loyola (ARG); W 21–10, 21–8	2 Q	Simon (USA); L 10–21, 14–21	Bronze medal final Velásquez (PER); W 21–7, 21–13	3rd place, bronze medalist(s)
Giuliana Póveda	Singles SH6	Xavier (BRA); W 21–1, 21–2	Cloëtta (CAN); W 21–2, 21–2	Velásquez (PER); W 21–9, 21–5	1 Q	Velásquez (PER); W 21–6, 21–3	Simon (USA); W 21–10, 21–11	1st place, gold medalist(s)
Rosa Velásquez	Singles SH6	Cloëtta (CAN); W 21–8, 21–10	Xavier (BRA); W 21–2, 21–7	Póveda (PER); L 9–21, 5–21	2 Q	Póveda (PER); L 6–21, 3–21	Bronze medal final Fernández (PER); L 7–21, 13–21	4
Pilar Jáuregui; Jaquelin Burgos	Doubles WH1–WH2	Silva / Santos (BRA); W 21–5, 21–4	Gomes / Souza (BRA); W 21–14, 21–11	Evangelista / Antunes (BRA); W 21–8, 21–14	1	—N/a		1st place, gold medalist(s)

Mixed

Athlete	Event	Preliminaries					Semifinals	Final / BM	
Athlete	Event	Opposition Result	Opposition Result	Opposition Result	Opposition Result	Rank	Opposition Result	Opposition Result	Rank
Renzo Bances; Jenny Ventocilla	Doubles SL3–SU5	Cleto / Reis (BRA); W 19–21, 21–17, 21–16	Vargas / Sierra (COL); W 21–8, 21–10	—N/a		1 Q	Rodrigues / Ávila (BRA); L 16–21, 15–21	Bronze medal final Ávila / Rojas (MEX); W 21–14, 21–16	3rd place, bronze medalist(s)
Alberto Cadenillas; Flor Arequipeño	Doubles SL3–SU5	Echeverría / Arriagada (CHI); W 21–10, 21–5	Ávila / Rojas (MEX); L 21–15, 14–21, 17–21	—N/a		2	Did not advance		
Pedro Pablo de Vinatea; Diana Rojas	Doubles SL3–SU5	Quinchanegua / Ubaque (COL); W 21–5, 21–6	Oliveira / Oliveira (BRA); L 5–21, 14–21	—N/a		2	Did not advance		
Nilton Quispe; Giuliana Póveda	Doubles SH6	Kendrick / Cloëtta (CAN); W 21–7, 21–3	Krajewski / Simon (USA); L 18–21, 12–21	Salva / Fernández (PER); W 21–10, 21–6	Mattos / Loyola (ARG); W 21–11, 21–2	2	—N/a		2nd place, silver medalist(s)
Jesús Salva; Rubí Fernández	Doubles SH6	Mattos / Loyola (ARG); W 21–16, 21–8	Quispe / Póveda (PER); L 10–21, 6–21	Kendrick / Cloëtta (CAN); W 21–10, 21–11	Krajewski / Simon (USA); L 10–21, 2–21	3	—N/a		3rd place, bronze medalist(s)

== Boccia ==
Men

Athlete	Event	Pool matches				Semifinals	Final / BM	
Athlete	Event	Opposition Score	Opposition Score	Opposition Score	Rank	Opposition Score	Opposition Score	Rank
Neil Castro	Individual BC1	Sanchez (MEX); L 0–8	Cryderman (CAN); L 5–8	—N/a	3	Did not advance		
Dean Acosta	Individual BC3	Aranda (CHI); W 5–4	Tay (GUA); W 9–0	Romero (COL); W 4*–4	1 Q	Romero (ARG); L 2–3	Bronze medal final Romero (COL); L 2–3	4

Women

Athlete	Event	Pool matches				Quarterfinals	Semifinals	Final / BM	
Athlete	Event	Opposition Score	Opposition Score	Opposition Score	Rank	Opposition Score	Opposition Score	Opposition Score	Rank
Niurka Callupe	Individual BC3	Barboza (URU); W 7–2	Ferrando (ARG); L 4–5	—N/a	2 Q	Calado (BRA); W 4–3	Oliveira (BRA); L 3–3*	Bronze medal final Quintriqueo (CHI); W 11–0	3rd place, bronze medalist(s)
Maria Pancca	Individual BC3	Oliveira (BRA); L 1–8	Guérette (CAN); W 8–1	Chastain (USA); W 9–1	2 Q	Ferrando (ARG); L 0–10	Did not advance		
Jenny Quispe	Individual BC4	Silva (BRA); W 6–2	Calderón (ARG); W 6–1	—N/a	1 Q	Manuel (MEX); L 3–7	Did not advance		

Mixed

Athlete	Event	Pool matches			Semifinals	Final / BM	
Athlete	Event	Opposition Score	Opposition Score	Rank	Opposition Score	Opposition Score	Rank
Dean Acosta; Niurka Callupe	Pairs BC3	Chile; W DNS	Argentina; W 9–0	1 Q	Brazil; W 3–2	Argentina; L 5–6	2nd place, silver medalist(s)

== Cycling ==
=== Road ===
Men

Athlete	Event	Result	Rank
Job Hilario	Time trial C1–5	28:30.02	5
Job Hilario	Road race C1–3	1:22:32	5
Yuber Pichihua	Time trial C1–5	30:38.44	15
Yuber Pichihua	Road race C1–3	1:26:16	9

=== Track ===
Men

Athlete	Event	Qualification		Final	
Athlete	Event	Time	Rank	Opposition Time	Rank
Yuber Pichihua	Pursuit C1–3	4:17.547	10	Did not advance	
Yuber Pichihua	Time trial C1–5	—N/a		1:19.451	17

== Football 5-a-side ==
Summary

Team	Event	Group stage						Final / BM	
Team	Event	Opposition Score	Opposition Score	Opposition Score	Opposition Score	Opposition Score	Rank	Opposition Score	Rank
Peru men's	Men's tournament	Colombia; L 0–2	Argentina; L 0–1	Chile; L 0–2	Mexico; D 1–1	Brazil; L 0–5	6	Fifth place match Mexico; L 0–0 (0–1 p)	6

Preliminary round

Pos	Team	Pld	W	D	L	GF	GA	GD	Pts	Qualification
1	Brazil	5	4	0	1	9	1	+8	12	Gold medal match
2	Colombia	5	4	0	1	9	1	+8	12	Gold medal match
3	Argentina	5	4	0	1	8	1	+7	12	Bronze medal match
4	Chile	5	1	1	3	2	7	−5	4	Bronze medal match
5	Mexico	5	0	2	3	1	9	−8	2	5th–6th place match
6	Peru	5	0	1	4	1	11	−10	1	5th–6th place match

Source: PASO
November 18
20:00

Colombia	2–0	Peru
Pérez 13', 3'	Report

Paralympic Training Center, Santiago
Referee: Alfredo Martínez (Mexico)

November 19
20:00

Argentina	1–0	Peru
Fernandes 9'	Report

Paralympic Training Center, Santiago
Referee: Ellen Grosskopf (Brazil)

November 20
18:00

Chile	2–0	Peru
Campos 22'; Silva 29'	Report

Paralympic Training Center, Santiago
Referee: Ellen Grosskopf (Brazil)

November 22
20:00

Peru	1–1	Mexico
Pérez 13'	Report	Rangel 29'

Paralympic Training Center, Santiago
Referee: Jesús Sanchez (Colombia)

November 23
18:00

Peru	0–5	Brazil
	Report	Alves 6', 9', 11'; Paraná 10'; Santos 27'

Paralympic Training Center, Santiago
Referee: Luis Oliveros (Colombia)

Fifth place match

November 25
16:00

Mexico	0–0	Peru
	Report
Penalties
Rivera (penalty missed); Sotelo (penalty missed); Rangel (penalty scored)	1–0	(penalty missed) Bartolo; (penalty missed) Estrada; (penalty missed) Pérez

Paralympic Training Center, Santiago
Referee: Pamela Gutierrez (Chile)

== Goalball ==
Summary

Team	Event	Group stage				Quarterfinal	Semifinal	Final / BM	
Team	Event	Opposition Score	Opposition Score	Opposition Score	Rank	Opposition Score	Opposition Score	Opposition Score	Rank
Peru women's	Women's tournament	Chile; L 2–4	Canada; L 1–11	United States; L 1–9	4 Q	Brazil; L 5–12	Did not advance		

== Judo ==
Men

Athlete	Event	Round of 16	Quarterfinals	Semifinals	Repechage 1	Repechage 2	Final / BM	
Athlete	Event	Opposition Result	Opposition Result	Opposition Result	Opposition Result	Opposition Result	Opposition Result	Rank
Antero Villalobos	−73 kg	Ramirez (ARG); L 00–10	Did not advance					

== Powerlifting ==
Men

Athlete	Event	Total lifted	Rank
Niel Garcia Trelles	–59 kg	151	3rd place, bronze medalist(s)

== Shooting ==
Mixed

Athlete	Event	Qualification		Final	
Athlete	Event	Score	Rank	Score	Rank
Jorge Arcela	R1/R2 – 10 m air rifle standing SH1	614.5	1 Q	239.8	2nd place, silver medalist(s)
Steve Medina	R1/R2 – 10 m air rifle standing SH1	593.3	5 Q	197.4	4
Milagros Palomino	R1/R2 – 10 m air rifle standing SH1	599.8	4 Q	217.4	3rd place, bronze medalist(s)
Jorge Arcela	R3 – 10 m air rifle prone SH1	635.6	1 Q	229.7	3rd place, bronze medalist(s)
Milagros Palomino	R3 – 10 m air rifle prone SH1	623.1	7 Q	251.3	2nd place, silver medalist(s)
Jorge Arcela	R6 – 50 m rifle prone SH1	615.6	3 Q	175.8	5
Milagros Palomino	R6 – 50 m rifle prone SH1	599.9	7 Q	113.6	8

== Swimming ==
Men

Athlete	Event	Heat		Final	
Athlete	Event	Time	Rank	Time	Rank
Rodrigo Santillan	50 m freestyle S2	—N/a		1:07.19	4
Rodrigo Santillan	100 m freestyle S2	—N/a		2:18.92	3rd place, bronze medalist(s)
Rodrigo Santillan	200 m freestyle S2	—N/a		4:38.19	3rd place, bronze medalist(s)
Rodrigo Santillan	50 m backstroke S2	—N/a		1:07.05	4
Rodrigo Santillan	100 m backstroke S2	—N/a		2:18.48	3rd place, bronze medalist(s)
José Silva	50 m freestyle S3	—N/a		1:06.05	4
José Silva	200 m freestyle S3	—N/a		4:51.65	4
José Silva	50 m backstroke S3	—N/a		1:06.20	3rd place, bronze medalist(s)
Leonardo Kanashiro	50 m freestyle S5	48.40	9	Did not advance	
Leonardo Kanashiro	200 m freestyle S5	3:38.53	8 Q	3:41.79	8
Leonardo Kanashiro	50 m backstroke S5	—N/a		1:01.86	7
Rodrigo Woo	50 m freestyle S11	—N/a		33.75	7
Rodrigo Woo	400 m freestyle S11	—N/a		6:09.91	4
Rodrigo Woo	100 m backstroke S11	—N/a		1:34.85	5
Rodrigo Woo	100 m breaststroke SB11	—N/a		1:53.06	7
Bruno Giraldo	200 m freestyle S14	2:30.24	10	Did not advance	
Bruno Giraldo	100 m backstroke S14	1:26.96	12	Did not advance	

Women

Athlete	Event	Heat		Final	
Athlete	Event	Time	Rank	Time	Rank
Brizeira Martinez	50 m freestyle S11	—N/a		47.41	5
Brizeira Martinez	100 m freestyle S11	—N/a		1:37.79	6
Brizeira Martinez	100 m backstroke S11	—N/a		1:44.91	6
Micaela Apaéstegui	100 m freestyle S9	1:13.15	8 Q	1:12.45	8
Micaela Apaéstegui	400 m freestyle S9	5:33.38	5 Q	5:30.90	5
Micaela Apaéstegui	100 m backstroke S9	—N/a		1:28.22	7
Micaela Apaéstegui	100 m breaststroke SB8	—N/a		1:51.20	5
Donia Felices	200 m freestyle S5	3:47.00	8 Q	3:48.10	8
Donia Felices	50 m butterfly S5	—N/a		1:01.80	5
Donia Felices	200 m individual medley SM5	—N/a		4:38.69	6

== Table tennis ==
Men

Athlete	Event	Preliminaries				Semifinals	Final / BM	
Athlete	Event	Opposition Result	Opposition Result	Opposition Result	Rank	Opposition Result	Opposition Result	Rank
Daniel Prado	Singles C6	Dettoni (CHI); L 0–3	Arguello (CRC); L 0–3	Seidenfeld (USA); L 0–3	4	Did not advance		
Guillermo Yañez	Singles C6	Altshuler (USA); L 0–3	Pino (CHI); L 0–3	Torres (CHI); L 0–3	4	Did not advance		

== Taekwondo ==
Men

Athlete	Event	Round of 16	Quarterfinals	Semifinals	Repechage	Final / BM	
Athlete	Event	Opposition Result	Opposition Result	Opposition Result	Opposition Result	Opposition Result	Rank
William Fernandez	−58 kg	Bye	Fernandez (ARG); L 9–40	Did not advance	Galeano (ARG); W 22–19	Bronze medal final Mejía (GUA); L 12–14	=5

Women

Athlete	Event	Quarterfinals	Semifinals	Final / BM	
Athlete	Event	Opposition Result	Opposition Result	Opposition Result	Rank
Leonor Espinoza	−47 kg	Bye	Correia (BRA); W 22–6	Romero (MEX); W 10–4	1st place, gold medalist(s)
Laura Puntriano	+65 kg	Montes de Oca (CUB); L 8–10	Did not advance	Bronze medal final Macedo (BRA); L 1–5	5

== Wheelchair basketball ==
Summary

Team	Event	Group stage				Semifinal	Final / BM	
Team	Event	Opposition Score	Opposition Score	Opposition Score	Rank	Opposition Score	Opposition Score	Rank
Peru women's	Women's tournament	Argentina; L 28–58	United States; L 12–80	Chile; W 47–44	3	5th–8th place classification El Salvador; W 48–19	Fifth place match Colombia; L 27–39	6

== Wheelchair tennis ==
Men

Athlete	Event	Round of 32	Round of 16	Quarterfinals	Semifinals	Final / BM	
Athlete	Event	Opposition Result	Opposition Result	Opposition Result	Opposition Result	Opposition Result	Rank
Ysabelino Apaza	Singles	Henderson (CAN); W 6–4, 6–4	Carneiro (BRA); L 0–6, 0–6	Did not advance			
Gerardo Chomba Caja	Singles	Venos (CAN); L 1–6, 1–6	Did not advance				
Ysabelino Apaza; Gerardo Chomba Caja	Doubles	—N/a	Bye	Cataldo / Tapia (CHI); L 0–6, 1–6	Did not advance		

Women

Athlete	Event	Round of 16	Quarterfinals	Semifinals	Final / BM	
Athlete	Event	Opposition Result	Opposition Result	Opposition Result	Opposition Result	Rank
Marleny Flores	Singles	Bernal (COL); L 0–6, 0–6	Did not advance			

== See also ==
- Peru at the 2023 Pan American Games
- Peru at the 2024 Summer Paralympics
