= Badminton at the 2024 Summer Paralympics – Qualification =

Qualification for badminton at the 2024 Summer Paralympics begins on 1 January 2023 and ends on 31 March 2024. There are expected to be 120 slots (60 male, 60 female) for the sport across sixteen medal events.

== Timeline ==
Eligible athletes have to gain points in order to qualify to compete at the Games, they must participate in a minimum of three qualifying tournaments. The list will be published on 2 April 2024.

| Competition | Dates | Venue |
|---|---|---|
| Spanish Para Badminton International 2023 | 20–26 February 2023 | (Spain) Vitoria-Gasteiz |
| Spanish Para Badminton International Toledo 2023 | 1–5 March 2023 | (Spain) Toledo |
| Brazil Para Badminton International 2023 | 10–16 April 2023 | (Brazil) São Paulo |
| Thailand Para Badminton International 2023 | 9–14 May 2023 | (Thailand) Pattaya |
| Bahrain Para Badminton International 2023 | 17–23 May 2023 | (Bahrain) Manama |
| Canada Para Badminton International 2023 | 14–18 June 2023 | (Canada) Ottawa |
| Uganda Para Badminton International 2023 | 3–9 July 2023 | (Uganda) Kampala |
| Africa Para Badminton Championships 2023 | 11–16 July 2023 | (Uganda) Kampala |
| 4 Nations Para Badminton International 2023 | 2–6 August 2023 | (United Kingdom) Sheffield |
| 2023 European Para Championships | 15–20 August 2023 | (Netherlands) Rotterdam |
| Indonesia Para Badminton International 2023 | 4–10 September 2023 | (Indonesia) Surakarta |
| Oceania Para Badminton Championships 2023 | 29 September – 1 October 2023 | (Australia) Perth |
| Western Australia Para Badminton International 2023 | 2–6 October 2023 | (Australia) Perth |
| 2022 Asian Para Games | 20–28 October 2023 | (China) Hangzhou |
| Japan Para Badminton International 2023 | 7–12 November 2023 | (Japan) Tokyo |
| 2023 Parapan American Games | 17–25 November 2023 | (Chile) Santiago |
| Dubai Para Badminton International 2023 | 13–17 December 2023 | (United Arab Emirates) Dubai |
| Egypt Para Badminton International 2024 | 22–28 January 2024 | (Egypt) Cairo |
| 2024 BWF Para-Badminton World Championships | 20–25 February 2024 | (Thailand) Pattaya |
| 4 Nations Para-Badminton International 2024 | 18–23 June 2024 | (United Kingdom) Glasgow |

== Qualification ==
The qualification slots are allocated to the individual athlete or doubles pair, not to the NPC. The qualification ranking list is regulated by the BWF.

- An NPC can allocated a maximum of ten male and female qualification slots, total of twenty slots. Exceptions are granted via the Bipartite Commission Invitation.
- An NPC can enter a maximum of one doubles pair of two players per doubles event, the players must be qualified via the Race to Paris Paralympic Doubles Ranking List and Mixed Doubles Ranking List.
- An NPC can enter one eligible player per singles event if they qualify via the Race to Paris Paralympic Singles Ranking List.

=== Entry into singles events from doubles ===
- Both players from WH1 and WH2 that have qualified for the men's/women's doubles event automatically gain a qualification slot in their respective singles events.
- Every male and female SL3, SL4, SU5 and SH6 who qualifies in the Mixed Doubles event automatically gain a qualification slot in their respective singles events.

=== Entry into doubles events from singles ===
- Qualified male and female WH1 and WH2 singles players who are both from the same NPC can invite a maximum of two WH1-WH2 Doubles pairs per NPC.
  - If more than two doubles pairs with athletes from the same NPC can be created from athletes qualifying in Bipartite Commission singles list, the Bipartite Commission will decide on how many and which doubles pairs will be entered.
- Qualified male and female SL3, SL4 and SU5 singles players who are from the same NPC, the BWF may decide to invite additional SL3-SU5 Mixed Doubles pairs to enter.
  - If more than two SL3-SL5 Doubles pairs with athletes from the same NPC can be created from athletes qualifying in Bipartite Commission singles list, the Bipartite Commission will decide how many and which doubles pairs will be entered.
- Qualified male and female SH6 singles players from the same NPC, the BWF may decide to invite additional SH6 Mixed Doubles pairs to enter.
  - If more than two SH6 Mixed Doubles pairs with athletes from the same NPC can be created from the athletes qualifying in Bipartite Commission singles list, the Bipartite Commission will decide how many and which SH6 Mixed Doubles pairs will be entered.

== Entry requirements ==
=== Singles ===
| Events Men + Women | Minimum entry |
|---|---|
| WH1 | 9 |
| WH2 | 6 |
| SL3 | 6 |
| SL4 | 6 |
| SU5 | 6 |
| SH6 | 10 |

=== Doubles ===
| Event | Sport class | Points | Combinations permitted | Combinations not permitted | Entry numbers Minimum entry |
|---|---|---|---|---|---|
| Men's/women's doubles | WH1 & WH2 | Maximum: 3 points | WH1 + WH2; WH1 + WH1 | WH2 + WH2 | 6 pairs |
| Mixed doubles | SL3-SU5 | Maximum: 8 points | SL3 + SL3; SL3 + SL4; SL3 + SU5; SL4 + SL4 | SL4 + SU5; SU5 + SU5 | 6 pairs |
| Mixed doubles | SH6 | — | SH6 + SH6 | — | 6 pairs |

=== Slot allocations ===
| Means of qualification | | Date | WH1 | WH2 | SL3 | SL4 | SU5 | SH6 | Total entries |
|---|---|---|---|---|---|---|---|---|---|
| Paralympic Doubles; Ranking List Allocation | | List published 2 April 2024 | Men's doubles WH1-WH2; 6 highest ranked pairs Women's doubles WH1-WH2; 6 highest ranked pairs | | —N/a | | | | 12 males 12 females |
| Paralympic Mixed Doubles; Ranking List Allocation | | List published 2 April 2024 | —N/a | | 6 highest ranked pairs | | | 6 highest ranked pairs | 12 males 12 females |
| Paralympic Singles; Ranking List Allocation | Men | List published 2 April 2024 | Following Doubles Ranking allocations, further slots will be allocated to highest ranked athletes | | | | | | |
| Paralympic Singles; Ranking List Allocation | Men | List published 2 April 2024 | 3 | 3 | 5 | 5 | 5 | 4 | 25 |
| Paralympic Singles; Ranking List Allocation | Women | List published 2 April 2024 | Following Doubles Ranking allocations, further slots will be allocated to highest ranked athletes | | | | | | |
| Paralympic Singles; Ranking List Allocation | Women | List published 2 April 2024 | 3 | 3 | 5 | 5 | 5 | 4 | 25 |
| Bipartite Commission Invitation Allocation | Men | 30 April 2024 | 3 | 3 | 7 | 7 | 7 | 1 | 11 |
| Bipartite Commission Invitation Allocation | Women | 30 April 2024 | 3 | 3 | 7 | 7 | 7 | 1 | 11 |

=== Bipartite commission invitation slots ===
- Two bipartite commission slots (one male, one female) are reserved for the host country. In the case that the host country obtains a slot via any other allocation method in either gender, the host country slot for the respective gender expires.
- Two bipartite commission slots (one male, one female) are reserved for each continent (Africa, Americas, Asia, Europe and Oceania).
  - If the continent has qualified only one Mixed Doubles pair across all events through the mixed doubles qualification, the continent will obtain an additional continental slot in singles in both genders.

== Qualified players ==
=== Singles ===
| Key | Description |
|---|---|
| ^{QS} | Qualified through singles ranking |
| ^{QD} | Qualified through doubles event |
| ^{IBCI} | Indicates Bipartite Commission Invitee |
| – | Nation's quota fulled, or was not selected by their governing body |

==== Men ====
Men's singles WH1
| Qual. | No. | QR | Athlete | Country | NPC rank | Points |
|---|---|---|---|---|---|---|
| ^{QD} | 1 | 1 | Qu Zimo | China | 1 | 60,550 |
| ^{QD} | 2 | 2 | Choi Jung-man | South Korea | 1 | 60,305 |
| ^{QD} | 3 | 3 | Thomas Wandschneider | Germany | 1 | 47,280 |
| ^{QD} | 4 | 4 | Hiroshi Murayama | Japan | 1 | 43,722 |
| ^{QD} | 5 | 5 | Muhammad Ikhwan Ramli | Malaysia | 1 | 43,299 |
| ^{QD} | 6 | 6 | Osamu Nagashima | Japan | 2 | 40,249 |
| ^{QD} | 7 | 7 | Jeong Jae-gun | South Korea | 2 | 40,125 |
| – | – | 8 | Keita Nishimura | Japan | – | 38,045 |
| ^{QS} | 8 | 9 | Yang Tong | China | 2 | 37,393 |
| – | – | 10 | Lee Sam-seop | South Korea | – | 36,536 |
| – | – | 11 | Yuri Ferrigno | Italy | – | 34,664 |
| ^{QD} | 9 | 12 | David Toupé | France | 1 | 34,120 |

Men's singles WH2
| Qual. | No. | QR | Athlete | Country | NPC rank | Points |
|---|---|---|---|---|---|---|
| ^{QD} | 1 | 1 | Daiki Kajiwara | Japan | 1 | 69,050 |
| ^{QD} | 2 | 2 | Kim Jung-jun | South Korea | 1 | 50,372 |
| ^{QD} | 3 | 3 | Yu Soo-young | South Korea | 2 | 48,913 |
| ^{QS} | 4 | 4 | Chan Ho Yuen | Hong Kong | 1 | 48,910 |
| ^{QD} | 5 | 5 | Rick Cornell Hellmann | Germany | 1 | 45,586 |
| ^{QD} | 6 | 6 | Takumi Matsumoto | Japan | 2 | 38,219 |
| ^{QD} | 7 | 7 | Thomas Jakobs | France | 1 | 36,564 |
| ^{IBCI} | 8 | 8 | Luca Olgiati | Switzerland | 1 | 36,553 |
| ^{IBCI} | 9 | 9 | Amir Levi | Israel | 1 | 35,946 |
| ^{IBCI} | 10 | 10 | Jaime Aránguiz | Chile | 1 | 35,321 |
| ^{QD} | 11 | 11 | Mai Jianpeng | China | 1 | 33,094 |
| – | – | 12 | Zhao Xin | China | – | 31,497 |
| ^{QD} | 12 | 13 | Noor Azwan Noorlan | Malaysia | 1 | 28,904 |

Men's singles SL3
| Qual. | No. | QR | Athlete | Country | NPC rank | Points |
|---|---|---|---|---|---|---|
| ^{QS} | 1 | 1 | Daniel Bethell | Great Britain | 1 | 65,305 |
| – | – | 2 | Pramod Bhagat | India | – | 64,050 |
| ^{QD} | 2 | 3 | Kumar Nitesh | India | 1 | 52,750 |
| ^{QS} | 3 | 4 | Manoj Sarkar | India | 2 | 43,754 |
| ^{QS} | 4 | 5 | Daisuke Fujihara | Japan | 1 | 42,730 |
| ^{QS} | 5 | 6 | Oleksandr Chyrkov | Ukraine | 1 | 39,958 |
| ^{QS} | 6 | 7 | Mongkhon Bunsun | Thailand | 1 | 38,278 |
| – | – | 8 | Mathieu Thomas | France | – | 37,470 |
| – | – | 9 | Nehal Gupta | India | – | 36,700 |
| – | – | 10 | Pedro Pablo de Vinatea | Peru | – | 30,598 |
| – | – | 11 | Umesh Kumar | India | – | 30,155 |
| – | – | 12 | William Roussy | Canada | – | 28,905 |
| – | – | 13 | Xiong Lichuan | China | – | 27,094 |
| ^{IBCI} | 7 | 14 | Wojtek Czyz | New Zealand | 1 | 26,788 |
50+
| ^{QD} | 8 | 77 | Yang Jianyuan | China | 1 | 2,860 |

Men's singles SL4
| Qual. | No. | QR | Athlete | Country | NPC rank | Points |
|---|---|---|---|---|---|---|
| ^{QD} | 1 | 1 | Lucas Mazur | France | 1 | 62,225 |
| ^{QD} | 2 | 2 | Suhas Lalinakere Yathiraj | India | 1 | 55,796 |
| ^{QD} | 3 | 3 | Fredy Setiawan | Indonesia | 1 | 53,205 |
| ^{QS} | 4 | 4 | Mohd Amin Burhanuddin | Malaysia | 1 | 48,528 |
| ^{IBCI} | 5 | 5 | Sukant Kadam | India | 2 | 45,996 |
| ^{IBCI} | 6 | 6 | Tarun Dhillon | India | 3 | 44,185 |
| ^{QD} | 7 | 7 | Hikmat Ramdani | Indonesia | 2 | 40,447 |
| ^{QS} | 8 | 8 | Shin Kyung-hwan | South Korea | 1 | 33,956 |
| ^{QS} | 9 | 9 | Marcel Adam | Germany | 1 | 33,731 |
| ^{IBCI} | 10 | 10 | Rogério Oliveira | Brazil | 1 | 33,614 |
| – | – | 11 | Rickard Nilsson | Sweden | – | 33,095 |
| – | – | 12 | Chawarat Kitichokwattana | Thailand | – | 33,052 |
| – | – | 13 | Naveen Sivakumar | India | – | 27,570 |
| – | – | 14 | Nilesh Gaikwad | India | – | 27,184 |
| – | – | 15 | Yeh En-chuan | Chinese Taipei | – | 27,116 |
| – | – | 16 | Guillaume Gailly | France | – | 26,851 |
| – | – | 17 | Diogo Daniel | Portugal | – | 25,760 |
| ^{IBCI} | 11 | 18 | Jeremiah Nnanna | Nigeria | 1 | 25,740 |
| ^{QD} | 12 | 19 | Siripong Teamarrom | Thailand | 1 | 24,100 |

Men's singles SU5
| Qual. | No. | QR | Athlete | Country | NPC rank | Points |
|---|---|---|---|---|---|---|
| ^{QS} | 1 | 1 | Cheah Liek Hou | Malaysia | 1 | 66,550 |
| ^{QS} | 2 | 2 | Dheva Anrimusthi | Indonesia | 1 | 59,400 |
| ^{QS} | 3 | 3 | Fang Jen-yu | Chinese Taipei | 1 | 49,458 |
| ^{IBCI} | 4 | 4 | Suryo Nugroho | Indonesia | 2 | 45,515 |
| ^{QS} | 5 | 5 | Méril Loquette | France | 1 | 44,556 |
| ^{IBCI} | 6 | 6 | Muhammad Fareez Anuar | Malaysia | 2 | 42,774 |
| ^{QD} | 7 | 7 | Taiyo Imai | Japan | 1 | 40,308 |
| – | – | 8 | Pu Gui-yu | Chinese Taipei | – | 36,333 |
| ^{QS} | 8 | 9 | Bartłomiej Mróz | Poland | 1 | 35,878 |

Men's singles SH6
| Qual. | No. | QR | Athlete | Country | NPC rank | Points |
|---|---|---|---|---|---|---|
| ^{QS} | 1 | 1 | Krishna Nagar | India | 1 | 61,777 |
| ^{QS} | 2 | 2 | Chu Man Kai | Hong Kong | 1 | 54,300 |
| ^{QS} | 3 | 3 | Vitor Tavares | Brazil | 1 | 48,710 |
| ^{QS} | 4 | 4 | Charles Noakes | France | 1 | 47,063 |
| ^{QD} | 5 | 5 | Jack Shephard | Great Britain | 1 | 44,652 |
| ^{IBCI} | 6 | 6 | Krysten Coombs | Great Britain | 2 | 44,280 |
| ^{QD} | 7 | 7 | Miles Krajewski | United States | 1 | 40,691 |
| ^{QD} | 8 | 8 | Lin Naili | China | 1 | 38,156 |
| – | – | 9 | Wong Chun Yim | Hong Kong | – | 36,239 |
| ^{QD} | 9 | 10 | Natthapong Meechai | Thailand | 1 | 35,017 |
| ^{QD} | 10 | 11 | Sivarajan Solaimalai | India | 2 | 32,320 |
| – | – | 12 | Zeng Qingtao | China | – | 30,812 |
| – | – | 13 | Héctor Salva | Peru | – | 30,231 |
| ^{QD} | 11 | 14 | Subhan | Indonesia | 1 | 30,174 |

==== Women ====
Women's singles WH1
| Qual. | No. | QR | Athlete | Country | NPC rank | Points |
|---|---|---|---|---|---|---|
| ^{QD} | 1 | 1 | Sarina Satomi | Japan | 1 | 60,100 |
| ^{QS} | 2 | 2 | Man-Kei To | Belgium | 1 | 58,205 |
| ^{QD} | 3 | 3 | Sujirat Pookkham | Thailand | 1 | 53,300 |
| ^{QD} | 4 | 4 | Yin Menglu | China | 1 | 49,582 |
| ^{QD} | 5 | 5 | Cynthia Mathez | Switzerland | 1 | 46,763 |
| ^{QS} | 6 | 6 | Henriett Koósz | Austria | 1 | 40,442 |
| ^{QD} | 7 | 7 | Hu Guang-chiou | Chinese Taipei | 1 | 35,791 |
| ^{QD} | 8 | 8 | Kwon Hyun-ah | South Korea | 1 | 35,734 |
| ^{QS} | 9 | 9 | Nina Gorodetzky | Israel | 1 | 34,889 |
| – | – | 10 | Fan Chaoyue | China | – | 33,956 |
| ^{IBCI} | 10 | 11 | Yuka Chokyu | Canada | 1 | 32,803 |
| ^{IBCI} | 11 | 12 | Daniele Torres | Brazil | 1 | 32,388 |

Women's singles WH2
| Qual. | No. | QR | Athlete | Country | NPC rank | Points |
|---|---|---|---|---|---|---|
| ^{QD} | 1 | 1 | Liu Yutong | China | 1 | 60,550 |
| ^{QS} | 2 | 2 | Pilar Jáuregui | Peru | 1 | 54,236 |
| ^{QS} | 3 | 3 | Emine Seçkin | Turkey | 1 | 49,228 |
| ^{QD} | 4 | 4 | Ilaria Renggli | Switzerland | 1 | 48,246 |
| ^{QS} | 5 | 5 | Li Hongyan | China | 2 | 46,304 |
| ^{QD} | 6 | 6 | Yuma Yamazaki | Japan | 1 | 44,217 |
| ^{QD} | 7 | 7 | Amnouy Wetwithan | Thailand | 1 | 39,288 |
| ^{QD} | 8 | 8 | Jung Gye-oul | South Korea | 1 | 39,054 |
| ^{QD} | 9 | 9 | Yang I-chen | Chinese Taipei | 1 | 33,053 |
| ^{IBCI} | 10 | 10 | Mischa Ginns | Australia | 1 | 32,640 |

Women's singles SL3
| Qual. | No. | QR | Athlete | Country | NPC rank | Points |
|---|---|---|---|---|---|---|
| ^{QS} | 1 | 1 | Qonitah Ikhtiar Syakuroh | Indonesia | 1 | 62,005 |
| ^{QS} | 2 | 2 | Xiao Zuxian | China | 1 | 57,672 |
| ^{QS} | 3 | 3 | Halime Yıldız | Turkey | 1 | 55,310 |
| ^{QS} | 4 | 4 | Manasi Girishchandra Joshi | India | 1 | 45,927 |
| ^{IBCI} | 5 | 5 | Mandeep Kaur | India | 2 | 43,233 |
| ^{QS} | 6 | 6 | Oksana Kozyna | Ukraine | 1 | 40,758 |
| ^{IBCI} | 7 | 7 | Céline Vinot | Australia | 1 | 35,278 |
| ^{IBCI} | 8 | 8 | Darunee Henpraiwan | Thailand | 1 | 32,564 |
| – | – | 9 | Parul Parmar | India | – | 31,914 |
| – | – | 10 | Coraline Bergeron | France | – | 31,859 |
| – | – | 11 | Adriane Ávila | Brazil | – | 31,187 |
| ^{IBCI} | 9 | 12 | Mariam Eniola Bolaji | Nigeria | 1 | 31,050 |
No singles ranking
| ^{QD} | 10 | – | Noriko Ito | Japan | 1 | — |

Women's singles SL4
| Qual. | No. | QR | Athlete | Country | NPC rank | Points |
|---|---|---|---|---|---|---|
| ^{QS} | 1 | 1 | Cheng Hefang | China | 1 | 60,550 |
| ^{QS} | 2 | 2 | Helle Sofie Sagøy | Norway | 1 | 53,219 |
| ^{QD} | 3 | 3 | Leani Ratri Oktila | Indonesia | 1 | 52,110 |
| ^{QS} | 4 | 4 | Haruka Fujino | Japan | 1 | 48,619 |
| ^{QD} | 5 | 5 | Khalimatus Sadiyah | Indonesia | 2 | 43,480 |
| ^{QD} | 6 | 6 | Palak Kohli | India | 1 | 41,402 |
| ^{IBCI} | 7 | 7 | Milena Surreau | France | 1 | 37,767 |
| ^{QD} | 8 | 8 | Faustine Noël | France | 2 | 36,130 |
No singles ranking
| ^{QD} | 9 | – | Nipada Saensupa | Thailand | 1 | — |

Women's singles SU5
| Qual. | No. | QR | Athlete | Country | NPC rank | Points |
|---|---|---|---|---|---|---|
| ^{QD} | 1 | 1 | Yang Qiuxia | China | 1 | 58,050 |
| ^{QS} | 2 | 2 | Maud Lefort | France | 1 | 56,933 |
| ^{QS} | 3 | 3 | Cathrine Rosengren | Denmark | 1 | 54,094 |
| ^{QD} | 4 | 4 | Thulasimathi Murugesan | India | 1 | 51,815 |
| ^{QS} | 5 | 5 | Manisha Ramadass | India | 2 | 47,547 |
| ^{QS} | 6 | 6 | Mamiko Toyoda | Japan | 1 | 38,287 |
| ^{IBCI} | 7 | 7 | Kaeda Kameyama | Japan | 2 | 37,564 |
| – | – | 8 | Akiko Sugino | Japan | – | 37,461 |
| ^{QS} | 8 | 9 | Beatriz Monteiro | Portugal | 1 | 36,728 |
| ^{IBCI} | 9 | 10 | Rosa De Marco | Italy | 1 | 32,270 |

Women's singles SH6
| Qual. | No. | QR | Athlete | Country | NPC rank | Points |
|---|---|---|---|---|---|---|
| ^{QD} | 1 | 1 | Rina Marlina | Indonesia | 1 | 56,747 |
| ^{QD} | 2 | 2 | Li Fengmei | China | 1 | 56,277 |
| ^{QD} | 3 | 3 | Nithya Sre Sivan | India | 1 | 50,855 |
| ^{QS} | 4 | 4 | Giuliana Póveda | Peru | 1 | 50,760 |
| ^{QS} | 5 | 5 | Lin Shuangbao | China | 2 | 49,696 |
| ^{QS} | 6 | 6 | Oliwia Szmigiel | Poland | 1 | 44,188 |
| ^{QD} | 7 | 7 | Rachel Choong | Great Britain | 1 | 44,000 |
| ^{IBCI} | 8 | 8 | Rubí Fernández | Peru | 2 | 35,003 |
| ^{QS} | 9 | 9 | Cai Yi-lin | Chinese Taipei | 1 | 34,378 |
| – | – | 10 | Yasmina Eissa | Egypt | – | 33,070 |
| – | – | 11 | Wu Yu-yen | Chinese Taipei | – | 33,031 |
| – | – | 12 | Daria Bujnicka | Poland | – | 32,888 |
| – | – | 13 | Nina Kozlova | Ukraine | – | 32,717 |
| ^{QD} | 10 | 14 | Jayci Simon | United States | 1 | 30,300 |
| – | – | 15 | Lam Ching Yung | Hong Kong | – | 25,315 |
| ^{QD} | 11 | 16 | Chai Saeyang | Thailand | 1 | 23,579 |

=== Doubles ===
| Key | Description |
|---|---|
| ^{QD} | Qualified through doubles ranking |
| ^{QS} | Qualified through singles event |
| ^{NP} | Qualified as new pair |
| ^{IBCI} | Indicates Bipartite Commission Invitee |
| – | Nation's quota fulled, or was not selected by their governing body |

==== Men ====
Men's doubles WH1–WH2
| Qual. | No. | QR | Athlete | | | | Country | NPC rank | Points |
| Qual. | No. | QR | SR | DR | Cl. | Player | Country | NPC rank | Points |
|---|---|---|---|---|---|---|---|---|---|
| ^{QD} | 1 | 1 | 11 | 1 | WH2 | Mai Jianpeng | China | 1 | 59,405 |
| ^{QD} | 1 | 1 | 1 | 1 | WH1 | Qu Zimo | China | 1 | 59,405 |
| ^{QD} | 2 | 2 | 2 | 2 | WH1 | Choi Jung-man | South Korea | 1 | 58,205 |
| ^{QD} | 2 | 2 | 2 | 2 | WH2 | Kim Jung-jun | South Korea | 1 | 58,205 |
| ^{QD} | 3 | 3 | 1 | 3 | WH2 | Daiki Kajiwara | Japan | 1 | 49,208 |
| ^{QD} | 3 | 3 | 4 | 3 | WH1 | Hiroshi Murayama | Japan | 1 | 49,208 |
| ^{QD} | 4 | 4 | 5 | 4 | WH2 | Rick Cornell Hellmann | Germany | 1 | 44,816 |
| ^{QD} | 4 | 4 | 3 | 4 | WH1 | Thomas Wandschneider | Germany | 1 | 44,816 |
| ^{QD} | 5 | 5 | 13 | 5 | WH2 | Noor Azwan Noorlan | Malaysia | 1 | 42,871 |
| ^{QD} | 5 | 5 | 5 | 5 | WH1 | Muhammad Ikhwan Ramli | Malaysia | 1 | 42,871 |
| ^{QD} | 6 | 6 | 7 | 6 | WH2 | Thomas Jakobs | France | 1 | 39,871 |
| ^{QD} | 6 | 6 | 12 | 6 | WH1 | David Toupé | France | 1 | 39,871 |
25+
| ^{QD} | 7 | 32 | 7 | 32 | WH1 | Jeong Jae-gun | South Korea | 2 | 7,550 |
| ^{QD} | 7 | 32 | 3 | 32 | WH2 | Yu Soo-young | South Korea | 2 | 7,550 |
New pair
| ^{NP} | 8 | – | 6 | 8 | WH2 | Takumi Matsumoto | Japan | 2 | — |
| ^{NP} | 8 | – | 6 | — | WH1 | Osamu Nagashima | Japan | 2 | — |

==== Women ====
Women's doubles WH1–WH2
| Qual. | No. | QR | Athlete | | | | Country | NPC rank | Points |
| Qual. | No. | QR | SR | DR | Cl. | Player | Country | NPC rank | Points |
|---|---|---|---|---|---|---|---|---|---|
| ^{QD} | 1 | 1 | 1 | 1 | WH2 | Liu Yutong | China | 1 | 54,105 |
| ^{QD} | 1 | 1 | 4 | 1 | WH1 | Yin Menglu | China | 1 | 54,105 |
| ^{QD} | 2 | 2 | 1 | 2 | WH1 | Sarina Satomi | Japan | 1 | 49,780 |
| ^{QD} | 2 | 2 | 6 | 2 | WH2 | Yuma Yamazaki | Japan | 1 | 49,780 |
| ^{QD} | 3 | 3 | 5 | 3 | WH1 | Cynthia Mathez | Switzerland | 1 | 49,619 |
| ^{QD} | 3 | 3 | 4 | 3 | WH2 | Ilaria Renggli | Switzerland | 1 | 49,619 |
| ^{QD} | 4 | 4 | 3 | 4 | WH1 | Sujirat Pookkham | Thailand | 1 | 48,894 |
| ^{QD} | 4 | 4 | 7 | 4 | WH2 | Amnouy Wetwithan | Thailand | 1 | 48,894 |
| ^{QD} | 5 | 5 | 8 | 5 | WH2 | Jung Gye-oul | South Korea | 1 | 38,260 |
| ^{QD} | 5 | 5 | 8 | 5 | WH1 | Kwon Hyun-ah | South Korea | 1 | 38,260 |
| ^{QD} | 6 | 6 | 7 | 6 | WH1 | Hu Guang-chiou | Chinese Taipei | 1 | 35,600 |
| ^{QD} | 6 | 6 | 9 | 6 | WH2 | Yang I-chen | Chinese Taipei | 1 | 35,600 |

==== Mixed ====
Mixed doubles SL3–SU5
| Qual. | No. | QR | Athlete | | | | Country | NPC rank | Points |
| Qual. | No. | QR | SR | DR | Cl. | Player | Country | NPC rank | Points |
|---|---|---|---|---|---|---|---|---|---|
| ^{QD} | 1 | 1 | 7 | 1 | SL4 | Hikmat Ramdani | Indonesia | 1 | 69,050 |
| ^{QD} | 1 | 1 | 3 | 1 | SL4 | Leani Ratri Oktila | Indonesia | 1 | 69,050 |
| ^{QD} | 2 | 2 | 3 | 2 | SL4 | Fredy Setiawan | Indonesia | 2 | 53,860 |
| ^{QD} | 2 | 2 | 5 | 2 | SL4 | Khalimatus Sadiyah | Indonesia | 2 | 53,860 |
| – | – | 3 | 2 | 3 | SL3 | Pramod Bhagat | India | – | 47,727 |
| – | – | 3 | 5 | 3 | SU5 | Manisha Ramadass | India | – | 47,727 |
| ^{QD} | 3 | 4 | 1 | 4 | SL4 | Lucas Mazur | France | 1 | 47,063 |
| ^{QD} | 3 | 4 | 8 | 4 | SL4 | Faustine Noël | France | 1 | 47,063 |
| ^{QD} | 4 | 5 | 3 | 5 | SL3 | Kumar Nitesh | India | 1 | 40,549 |
| ^{QD} | 4 | 5 | 4 | 5 | SU5 | Thulasimathi Murugesan | India | 1 | 40,549 |
| – | – | 6 | 11 | 6 | SU5 | Chirag Baretha | India | – | 39,000 |
| – | – | 6 | 5 | 6 | SL3 | Mandeep Kaur | India | – | 39,000 |
| – | – | 7 | 10 | 7 | SU5 | Ruthick Ragupathi | India | – | 37,970 |
| – | – | 7 | 4 | 7 | SL3 | Manasi Girishchandra Joshi | India | – | 37,970 |
| ^{QD} | 5 | 8 | 7 | 8 | SU5 | Taiyo Imai | Japan | 1 | 35,053 |
| ^{QD} | 5 | 8 | – | 8 | SL3 | Noriko Ito | Japan | 1 | 35,053 |
| – | – | 9 | 5 | 9 | SU5 | Méril Loquette | France | – | 34,439 |
| – | – | 9 | 10 | 9 | SL3 | Coraline Bergeron | France | – | 34,439 |
| – | – | 10 | 8 | 10 | SL3 | Mathieu Thomas | France | – | 32,376 |
| – | – | 10 | 2 | 10 | SU5 | Maud Lefort | France | – | 32,376 |
| ^{QD} | 6 | 11 | 19 | 11 | SL4 | Siripong Teamarrom | Thailand | 1 | 32,204 |
| ^{QD} | 6 | 11 | – | 11 | SL4 | Nipada Saensupa | Thailand | 1 | 32,204 |
| – | – | 12 | 5 | 12 | SL3 | Daisuke Fujihara | Japan | – | 31,497 |
| – | – | 12 | 8 | 12 | SU5 | Akiko Sugino | Japan | – | 31,497 |
| ^{QD} | 7 | 13 | 77 | 13 | SL3 | Yang Jianyuan | China | 1 | 31,008 |
| ^{QD} | 7 | 13 | 1 | 13 | SU5 | Yang Qiuxia | China | 1 | 31,008 |
New pair
| ^{NP} | 8 | – | 2 | 46 | SL4 | Suhas Lalinakere Yathiraj | India | 2 | — |
| ^{NP} | 8 | – | 6 | 20 | SL4 | Palak Kohli | India | 2 | — |

Mixed doubles SH6
| Qual. | No. | QR | Athlete | | | | Country | NPC rank | Points |
| Qual. | No. | QR | SR | DR | Cl. | Player | Country | NPC rank | Points |
|---|---|---|---|---|---|---|---|---|---|
| ^{QD} | 1 | 1 | 14 | 1 | SH6 | Subhan | Indonesia | 1 | 60,875 |
| ^{QD} | 1 | 1 | 1 | 1 | SH6 | Rina Marlina | Indonesia | 1 | 60,875 |
| ^{QD} | 2 | 2 | 8 | 2 | SH6 | Lin Naili | China | 1 | 52,796 |
| ^{QD} | 2 | 2 | 2 | 2 | SH6 | Li Fengmei | China | 1 | 52,796 |
| – | – | 3 | 12 | 3 | SH6 | Zeng Qingtao | China | – | 47,510 |
| – | – | 3 | 5 | 3 | SH6 | Lin Shuangbao | China | – | 47,510 |
| ^{QD} | 3 | 4 | 11 | 4 | SH6 | Sivarajan Solaimalai | India | 1 | 44,830 |
| ^{QD} | 3 | 4 | 3 | 4 | SH6 | Nithya Sre Sivan | India | 1 | 44,830 |
| ^{QD} | 4 | 5 | 5 | 5 | SH6 | Jack Shephard | Great Britain | 1 | 44,525 |
| ^{QD} | 4 | 5 | 7 | 5 | SH6 | Rachel Choong | Great Britain | 1 | 44,525 |
| ^{QD} | 5 | 6 | 10 | 6 | SH6 | Natthapong Meechai | Thailand | 1 | 40,972 |
| ^{QD} | 5 | 6 | 16 | 6 | SH6 | Chai Saeyang | Thailand | 1 | 40,972 |
| ^{QD} | 6 | 7 | 7 | 7 | SH6 | Miles Krajewski | United States | 1 | 38,016 |
| ^{QD} | 6 | 7 | 14 | 7 | SH6 | Jayci Simon | United States | 1 | 38,016 |

== See also ==
- Badminton at the 2024 Summer Olympics – Qualification
