= Rogério de Oliveira =

Brazilian para-badminton player

Rogério Oliveira
Personal information
- Full name: Rogério Junior Xavier de Oliveira
- Born: 4 December 2000 (age 25) Presidente Prudente, São Paulo, Brazil

Sport
- Country: Brazil
- Sport: Badminton
- Handedness: Right

Men's singles SL4 Men's doubles SL3–SU5 Mixed doubles SL3–SU5
- Highest ranking: 6 (MS 18 July 2023); 6 (MD with Eduardo Oliveira 30 April 2019); 11 (XD with Edwarda Dias 21 February 2023)
- Current ranking: 14 (MS); 18 (XD with Edwarda Dias) (1 October 2024)
- BWF profile
Medal record
Men's para-badminton
Representing Brazil
Parapan American Games
Gold medal – first place	2023 Santiago	Men's singles
Gold medal – first place	2023 Santiago	Mixed doubles
Silver medal – second place	2019 Lima	Men's singles
Pan Am Championships
Gold medal – first place	2018 Lima	Men's doubles
Gold medal – first place	2022 Cali	Men's singles
Gold medal – first place	2022 Cali	Mixed doubles
Silver medal – second place	2016 Medellín	Men's singles
Bronze medal – third place	2018 Lima	Men's singles
South American Championships
Gold medal – first place	2021 Joinville	Men's singles
Gold medal – first place	2021 Joinville	Men's doubles
Gold medal – first place	2021 Joinville	Mixed doubles

Rogério Junior Xavier de Oliveira (born 4 December 2000) is a Brazilian para-badminton player. He was the men's singles SL4 champion at the 2023 Parapan American Games. In 2024, he represented Brazil in the men's singles SL4 event at the 2024 Summer Paralympics. He did not advance to the knockout stage.

== Biography ==
At 8 years old, Rogério suffered an accident at school when he fell off a wall and fractured his right femur, which caused his right leg to shorten by 8 cm. He was introduced to para-badminton during a lecture at school in 2013 and later joined the Brazilian national para-badminton team in 2016.

== Achievements ==
=== Parapan American Games ===
Men's singles SL4

Year	Venue	Opponent	Score	Result
2019	National Sport Village, Lima, Peru	(Guatemala) Raúl Anguiano	16–21, 12–21	Silver
2023	Olympic Training Center, Santiago, Chile	(Mexico) Maximiliano Ávila	21–12, 21–15	Gold

Mixed doubles SL3–SU5

Year	Venue	Partner	Opponent	Score	Result
2023	Olympic Training Center, Santiago, Chile	(Brazil) Edwarda Dias	(Brazil) Yuki Rodrigues (Brazil) Adriane Ávila	21–13, 21–13	Gold

=== Pan Am Championships ===
Men's singles SL4

Year	Venue	Opponent	Score	Result
2016	Coliseo Municipal de Envigado, Medellín, Colombia	(Guatemala) Raúl Anguiano	14–21, 14–21	Silver
2018	National Sport Village, Lima, Peru	(Canada) Pascal Lapointe	15–21, 14–21	Bronze
2022	Coliseo Alberto León Betancur, Cali, Colombia	(Mexico) Maximiliano Ávila	21–12, 21–12	Gold

Men's doubles SL3–SU5

Year	Venue	Partner	Opponent	Score	Result
2018	National Sport Village, Lima, Peru	(Brazil) Eduardo Oliveira	(Brazil) Ricardo Cavalli (Brazil) Geraldo da Silva Oliveira	21–9, 21–11	Gold
2018	National Sport Village, Lima, Peru	(Brazil) Eduardo Oliveira	(Peru) Esteban Juárez (Peru) César Suárez	21–3, 21–7	Gold
2018	National Sport Village, Lima, Peru	(Brazil) Eduardo Oliveira	(Guatemala) Raúl Anguiano (Canada) Pascal Lapointe	21–18, 20–22, 21–18	Gold
2018	National Sport Village, Lima, Peru	(Brazil) Eduardo Oliveira	(Venezuela) Kleiber Mijares (Colombia) Jean Paul Ortiz	21–9, 21–7	Gold

Mixed doubles SL3–SU5

Year	Venue	Partner	Opponent	Score	Result
2022	Coliseo Alberto León Betancur, Cali, Colombia	(Brazil) Edwarda Dias	(Peru) Renzo Bances (Peru) Jenny Ventocilla	21–19, 21–8	Gold

=== South American Championships ===
Men's singles SL4

Year	Venue	Opponent	Score	Result
2021	Ginásio Univille, Joinville, Brazil	(Peru) Renzo Bances	21–19, 21–19	Gold
2021	Ginásio Univille, Joinville, Brazil	(Peru) Pablo Cueto	21–7, 21–11	Gold
2021	Ginásio Univille, Joinville, Brazil	(Brazil) Breno Johann	21–19, 17–21, 21–11	Gold
2021	Ginásio Univille, Joinville, Brazil	(Brazil) Eugênio Cleto	21–11, 21–9	Gold

Men's doubles SL3–SU5

Year	Venue	Partner	Opponent	Score	Result
2021	Ginásio Univille, Joinville, Brazil	(Brazil) Eduardo Oliveira	(Brazil) Ricardo Cavalli (Brazil) Rivaldo Arruda	21–10, 21–11	Gold
2021	Ginásio Univille, Joinville, Brazil	(Brazil) Eduardo Oliveira	(Peru) Alberto Cadenillas (Brazil) Genivaldo Duarte Silva	21–8, 21–10	Gold
2021	Ginásio Univille, Joinville, Brazil	(Brazil) Eduardo Oliveira	(Brazil) Felipe Matos da Costa (Brazil) Geraldo da Silva Oliveira	21–4, 21–10	Gold
2021	Ginásio Univille, Joinville, Brazil	(Brazil) Eduardo Oliveira	(Brazil) Cícero Lima Liberal (Brazil) José Artur Nogueira	21–6, 21–4	Gold

Mixed doubles SL3–SU5

Year	Venue	Partner	Opponent	Score	Result
2021	Ginásio Univille, Joinville, Brazil	(Brazil) Edwarda Dias	(Brazil) Ricardo Cavalli (Brazil) Abinaécia Silva	21–13, 21–11	Gold

=== International tournaments (2011–2021) (2 runners-up) ===
Men's singles SL4

Year	Tournament	Opponent	Score	Result
2016	Colombia Para-Badminton International	(Guatemala) Raúl Anguiano	13–21, 8–21	(silver) Runner-up

Men's doubles SL3–SU5

Year	Tournament	Partner	Opponent	Score	Result
2018	Brazil Para-Badminton International	(Brazil) Eduardo Oliveira	(Japan) Gen Shogaki (Japan) Tetsuo Ura	11–21, 9–21	(silver) Runner-up
