= 2010 Pan Am Para-Badminton Championships =

Tournament details
- Dates: 21–24 October 2010
- Edition: 1st
- Venue: Clube Curitibano
- Location: Curitiba, Brazil

The 2010 Pan Am Para-Badminton Championships (Portuguese: Campeonato Pan-Americano de Para-Badminton 2010) was the inaugural edition of the Pan American Para-Badminton Championships. The tournament was held simultaneously with the 2010 Pan Am Badminton Championships from 21 to 24 October at the Clube Curitibano Gymnasium in Curitiba, Brazil.

Only the men's events were held. Brazil finished on top of the medal table with 5 gold medals, four silver medals and 9 bronze medals.

== Medalists ==
Event	Gold	Silver	Bronze
Men's singles W1–W2	(Brazil) Gabriel Jannini	(Brazil) Gustavo Richter	(Brazil) Jaime Augusto
Men's singles W1–W2	(Brazil) Gabriel Jannini	(Brazil) Gustavo Richter	(Brazil) Carlos Rodrigues
Men's singles W1–W3	(Brazil) Rodrigo Campos Oliveira	(Brazil) Rômulo Soares	(Brazil) Gabriel Jannini
Men's singles W1–W3	(Brazil) Rodrigo Campos Oliveira	(Brazil) Rômulo Soares	(Brazil) Carlos Rodrigues
Men's singles STL1–STL2	(Brazil) Jonathan Cardoso	(Peru) Pedro Pablo de Vinatea	(Brazil) Jônatas Barbosa
Men's singles STL1–STL2	(Brazil) Jonathan Cardoso	(Peru) Pedro Pablo de Vinatea	(Brazil) Luiz Henrique Moreira
Men's singles STL3–STU5	(Guatemala) Raúl Anguiano	(Brazil) Geraldo da Silva Oliveira	(Brazil) Rivaldo Arruda
Men's doubles W1–W3	(Brazil) Rodrigo Campos Oliveira (Brazil) Rômulo Soares	(Brazil) Jaime Augusto (Brazil) Gabriel Jannini	(Brazil) Rodolfo Ramos Wanderley (Brazil) Carlos Rodrigues
Men's doubles STL1–STU5	(Brazil) Jonathan Cardoso (Brazil) Geraldo da Silva Oliveira	(Guatemala) Raúl Anguiano (Guatemala) Danilo Velázquez	(Brazil) Rivaldo Arruda (Brazil) Serafim Uedes de Oliveira

== Medal table ==
* Host nation (Brazil)

Rank	Nation	Gold	Silver	Bronze	Total
1	Brazil*	5	4	9	18
2	Guatemala	1	1	0	2
3	Peru	0	1	0	1
Totals (3 entries)		6	6	9	21

== See also ==
- 2010 Pan Am Badminton Championships
