= Badminton at the 2023 Parapan American Games – Women's singles WH2 =

Women's singles WH2 at the Parapan American Games
- Venue: Olympic Training Center, Santiago
- Dates: 22 – 26 November 2023
- Competitors: 6 from 4 nations

The women's singles WH2 badminton tournament at the 2023 Parapan American Games is playing from 22 to 26 November 2023 at the Olympic Training Center in Santiago, Chile. A total of six players competed at the tournament, two of whom were seeded.

== Seeds ==
The following players were seeded:

1. Pilar Jáuregui (PER)
2. Maria Gilda Antunes (BRA)

== Group stage ==
=== Group A ===
Pos	Team	Pld	W	L	GF	GA	GD	PF	PA	PD	Qualification
1	Pilar Jáuregui (PER) [1]	0	0	0	0	0	0	0	0	0	Qualification to elimination stage
2	Daniela Zapata (CHI)	0	0	0	0	0	0	0	0	0	Qualification to elimination stage
3	Ruth Vicente (ARG)	0	0	0	0	0	0	0	0	0	

First match(es) will be played: 22 November 2023. Source: Group A – standings

Date	Competitor	Score	Competitor	Game 1	Game 2	Game 3
	Pilar Jáuregui (Peru)	[0–0]	(Chile) Daniela Zapata	–	–	
	Ruth Vicente (Argentina)	[0–0]	(Chile) Daniela Zapata	–	–	
	Pilar Jáuregui (Peru)	[0–0]	(Argentina) Ruth Vicente	–	–	

=== Group B ===
Pos	Team	Pld	W	L	GF	GA	GD	PF	PA	PD	Qualification
1	Maria Gilda Antunes (BRA) [2]	0	0	0	0	0	0	0	0	0	Qualification to elimination stage
2	Aline Cabral (BRA)	0	0	0	0	0	0	0	0	0	Qualification to elimination stage
3	Denith Silva (PER)	0	0	0	0	0	0	0	0	0	

First match(es) will be played: 22 November 2023. Source: Group B – standings

Date	Competitor	Score	Competitor	Game 1	Game 2	Game 3
	Maria Gilda Antunes (Brazil)	[0–0]	(Brazil) Aline Cabral	–	–	
	Denith Silva (Peru)	[0–0]	(Brazil) Aline Cabral	–	–	
	Maria Gilda Antunes (Brazil)	[0–0]	(Peru) Denith Silva	–	–	

== Elimination round ==
Semi-finals

Gold medal match
Bronze medal match
