= Badminton at the 2023 Parapan American Games – Women's singles WH1 =

Women's singles WH1 at the 2023 Parapan American Games
- Venue: Olympic Training Center, Santiago
- Dates: 22 – 26 November 2023
- Competitors: 7 from 5 nations

Medalists
1st place, gold medalist(s)		Daniele Souza	Brazil
2nd place, silver medalist(s)		Jaquelin Burgos	Peru
3rd place, bronze medalist(s)		Yuka Chokyu	Canada

The women's singles WH1 badminton tournament at the 2023 Parapan American Games is playing from 22 to 26 November 2023 at the Olympic Training Center in Santiago, Chile. A total of seven players competed at the tournament, two of whom were seeded.

== Seeds ==
The following players were seeded:

1. Daniele Souza (BRA)
2. Yuka Chokyu (CAN)

== Group stage ==
=== Group A ===
Pos	Team	Pld	W	L	GF	GA	GD	PF	PA	PD	Qualification
1	Daniele Souza (BRA) [1]	1	1	0	2	0	+2	42	14	+28	Qualification to elimination stage
2	Amy Burnett (USA)	2	1	1	2	2	0	56	52	+4	Qualification to elimination stage
3	Joy Ann Clarke (BAR)	1	0	1	0	2	−2	10	42	−32	

First match(es) will be played: 22 November 2023. Source: Group A – standings

Date	Competitor	Score	Competitor	Game 1	Game 2	Game 3
22 November	Daniele Souza (Brazil)	2–0	(United States) Amy Burnett	21–9	21–5	—
22 November	Joy Ann Clarke (Barbados)	0–2	(United States) Amy Burnett	7–21	3–21	—
23 November	Daniele Souza (Brazil)	2–0	(Barbados) Joy Ann Clarke	21–0	21–2	—

=== Group B ===
Pos	Team	Pld	W	L	GF	GA	GD	PF	PA	PD	Qualification
1	Yuka Chokyu (CAN) [2]	0	0	0	0	0	0	0	0	0	Qualification to elimination stage
2	Ana Gomes (BRA)	0	0	0	0	0	0	0	0	0	Qualification to elimination stage
3	Jaquelin Burgos (PER)	0	0	0	0	0	0	0	0	0	
4	Auricélia Evangelista (BRA)	0	0	0	0	0	0	0	0	0	

First match(es) will be played: 22 November 2023. Source: Group B – standings

Date	Competitor	Score	Competitor	Game 1	Game 2	Game 3
November 22	Yuka Chokyu (Canada)	2–0	(Peru) Jaquelin Burgos	21–13	21–16	—
November 22	Ana Gomes (Brazil)	2–0	(Brazil) Auricélia Evangelista	21–11	21–10	—
November 22	Jaquelin Burgos (Peru)	2–0	(Brazil) Ana Gomes	21–13	21–11	—
November 22	Yuka Chokyu (Canada)	2–0	(Brazil) Auricélia Evangelista	21–7	21–11	—
November 23	Yuka Chokyu (Canada)	2–0	(Brazil) Ana Gomes	22–20	21–4	—
November 23	Jaquelin Burgos (Peru)	2–0	(Brazil) Auricélia Evangelista	21–13	22–20	—

== Elimination round ==
Semi-finals

Gold medal match
Bronze medal match
