= Badminton at the 2019 Parapan American Games =

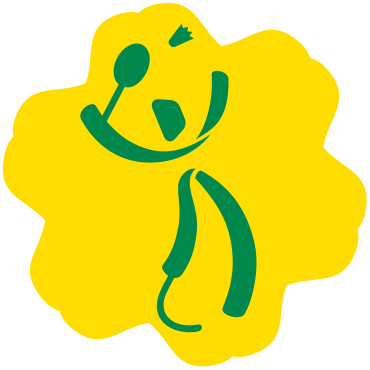
- Venue: National Sport Village
- Dates: 29 August - 1 September
- Competitors: 52 from 11 nations

Badminton at the 2019 Parapan American Games in Lima, Peru from 29 August to 1 September. This is the debut appearance of badminton to be in the Parapan Games, this event will act as a qualifier to add points on the Road to Tokyo 2020 qualification where para badminton will also make its first appearance.

== Participating nations ==
There are 36 male and 16 female players from 11 nations participating.

- Argentina (1)
- Brazil (14)
- Canada (7)
- Chile (4)
- Colombia (1)
- Cuba (1)
- Guatemala (1)
- Mexico (2)
- Peru (10) (Host country)
- United States (3)
- Venezuela (3)

== Medal table ==
* Host nation (Peru)

Rank	NPC	Gold	Silver	Bronze	Total
1	Brazil (BRA)	4	4	2	10
2	Peru (PER)	2	0	1	3
3	Canada (CAN)	1	2	2	5
4	Guatemala (GUA)	1	0	0	1
5	Cuba (CUB)	0	1	2	3
6	United States (USA)	0	1	0	1
7	Venezuela (VEN)	0	0	1	1
Totals (7 entries)		8	8	8	24

== Medalists ==
Event	Gold	Silver	Bronze
Men's singles SL3	Pedro Pablo de Vinatea; Peru	Leonardo Zuffo; Brazil	Rolando Bello; Cuba
Men's singles SL4	Raúl Anguiano; Guatemala	Rogério de Oliveira; Brazil	Pascal Lapointe; Canada
Men's singles SU5	Eduardo de Oliveira; Brazil	Ricardo Cavalli; Brazil	Kleiber Mijares; Venezuela
Men's singles SS6	Vitor Tavares; Brazil	Miles Krajewski; United States	Hector Salva; Peru
Women's singles WH2	Pilar Jáuregui; Peru	Yuka Chokyu; Canada	Daniele Souza; Brazil
Women's singles SU5	Mikaela Almeida; Brazil	Olivia Meier; Canada	Laura Lanes; Cuba
Men's doubles WH1-WH2	Brazil (BRA); Marcelo Conceição; Júlio Godoy	Brazil (BRA); Rodolfo Cano; Rômulo Soares	Canada (CAN); Bernard Lapointe; Richard Peter
Mixed doubles SL3-SU5	Canada (CAN); Pascal Lapointe; Olivia Meier	Cuba (CUB); Rolando Bello; Laura Lanes	Brazil (BRA); Ricardo Cavalli; Cintya Silva

== See also ==
- Badminton at the 2019 Pan American Games
- Badminton at the 2020 Summer Paralympics
