= Archery at the 2023 Parapan American Games – Women's individual recurve open =

Women's individual recurve open at the 2023 Parapan American Games
- Venue: Archery Center
- Dates: November 19 - November 22
- Competitors: 8 from 7 nations

Medalists
1st place, gold medalist(s)		Daniela Campos	Peru
2nd place, silver medalist(s)		Mónica Daza	Colombia
3rd place, bronze medalist(s)		Candice Caesar	United States

The women's individual recurve open competition of the archery events at the 2023 Parapan American Games was held from November 19 to 22 at the Archery Center in Santiago, Chile.

== Schedule ==
Date	Time	Round
November 19, 2023	19:30	Ranking Round
November 20, 2023	13:50	Quarterfinals
November 20, 2023	14:30	Semifinals
November 22, 2023	13:30	Final

== Results ==
WR world record | AR area record | CR championship record | GR games record | NR national record | OR Olympic record | PB personal best | SB season best | WL world leading (in a given season)

=== Ranking round ===
The results were as follows:

Rank	Archer	Nation	Score	Note
1	Mónica Daza	Colombia	523	
2	Karen Rocha	Mexico	494	
3	Daniela Campos	Peru	489	
4	Candice Caesar	United States	454	
5	Allison Brown	United States	444	
6	Tercia Figueiredo	Brazil	424	
7	Leydis Posada	Cuba	416	
8	Mirta Rodríguez	Argentina	380	

=== Competition rounds ===
The results during the elimination rounds were as follows:

Quarterfinals
1	M. Daza (COL)	2	2	2
8	M. Rodríguez (ARG)	0	0	0
5	A. Brown (USA)	0	0	0
4	C. Caesar (USA)	2	'2	2
3	D. Campos (PER)	0	2	2	2
6	T. Figueiredo (BRA)	2	0	0	0
7	L. Posada (CUB)	0	2	0	0
2	K. Rocha (MEX)	2	0	2	2

Semifinals
1	M. Daza (COL)	2	2	0	2
4	C. Caesar (USA)	0	0	2	0
3	D. Campos (PER)	2	0	0	2	2
2	K. Rocha (MEX)	0	2	2	0	0

Final
1	M. Daza (COL)	0	0	0
3	D. Campos (PER)	2	2	2
Bronze medal match
4	C. Caesar (USA)	2	0	0	2	2
2	K. Rocha (MEX)	0	2	2	0
