= Miles Krajewski =

American para-badminton player (born 2005)

Personal information
- Born: June 27, 2005 (age 21) Lincoln, Nebraska, U.S.
- Height: 4 ft 5 in (135 cm)

Sport
- Country: United States
- Sport: Badminton
- Handedness: Right
- Coached by: Moss Lattison

Men's singles and doubles SH6
- Highest ranking: 7 (MS 15 April 2024); 1 (MD with Vitor Tavares 15 April 2024)
- Current ranking: 7 (MS); 1 (MD with Vitor Tavares) (16 April 2024)
Medal record
Para-badminton
Representing United States
Paralympic Games
| Silver medal – second place | 2024 Paris | Mixed doubles |
World Championships
| Gold medal – first place | 2026 Manama | Men's singles |
| Silver medal – second place | 2022 Tokyo | Men's doubles |
| Bronze medal – third place | 2019 Basel | Men's doubles |
| Bronze medal – third place | 2024 Pattaya | Men's doubles |
| Bronze medal – third place | 2024 Pattaya | Mixed doubles |
| Bronze medal – third place | 2026 Manama | Men's doubles |
Parapan American Games
| Gold medal – first place | 2023 Santiago | Men's singles |
| Gold medal – first place | 2023 Santiago | Mixed doubles |
| Silver medal – second place | 2019 Lima | Men's singles |
Pan Am Championships
| Gold medal – first place | 2016 Medellín | Men's singles |
| Gold medal – first place | 2016 Medellín | Men's doubles |
| Gold medal – first place | 2018 Lima | Men's doubles |
| Gold medal – first place | 2022 Cali | Men's singles |
| Gold medal – first place | 2022 Cali | Doubles |
| Silver medal – second place | 2018 Lima | Men's singles |
| Silver medal – second place | 2022 Cali | Mixed doubles |

Miles Krajewski (born June 27, 2005) is an American para-badminton player who competes in international elite events. He is a World Championship silver medalist in the men's doubles and a Parapan American Games gold medalist in the men's singles and mixed doubles. Along with winning two gold medals in the 2016 Pan Am Championship and a 2018 silver medalist in singles and gold medalist in doubles. He won silver in doubles at the World Championships in Tokyo and then won gold in singles at the Parapan American Games in Colombia two weeks after World Championships. On April 3, 2024, he qualified to represent the United States at the 2024 Summer Paralympics, along with his mixed doubles partner Jayci Simon. They won the silver medal in mixed doubles at the 2024 Summer Paralympics in Paris, France.

== Achievements ==
=== World Championships ===
Men's singles SU5

| Year | Venue | Opponent | Score | Result |
|---|---|---|---|---|
| 2026 | Isa Sports City, Manama, Bahrain | (Thailand) Natthapong Meechai | 21–19, 22–20 | Gold |

Men’s doubles

| Year | Venue | Partner | Opponent | Score | Result |
|---|---|---|---|---|---|
| 2019 | St. Jakobshalle, Basel, Switzerland | (Brazil) Vitor Tavares | (Hong Kong) Chu Man Kai (Hong Kong) Wong Chun Yim | 6–21, 5–21 | Bronze |
| 2022 | Yoyogi National Gymnasium, Tokyo, Japan | (Brazil) Vitor Tavares | (South Korea) Lee Dae-sung (Thailand) Natthapong Meechai | 21–19, 11–21, 15–21 | Silver |
| 2024 | Pattaya Exhibition and Convention Hall, Pattaya, Thailand | (Brazil) Vitor Tavares | (China) Lin Naili (China) Zeng Qingtao | 9–21, 12–21 | Bronze |
| 2026 | Isa Sports City, Manama, Bahrain | (Brazil) Vitor Tavares | (China) Lin Naili (China) Zeng Qingtao | 14–21, 12–21 | Bronze |

Men’s doubles

| Year | Venue | Partner | Opponent | Score | Result |
|---|---|---|---|---|---|
| 2024 | Pattaya Exhibition and Convention Hall, Pattaya, Thailand | (United States) Jayci Simon | (China) Lin Naili (China) Li Fengmei | 17–21, 9–21 | Bronze |

=== Parapan American Games ===
Men's singles

| Year | Venue | Opponent | Score | Result |
|---|---|---|---|---|
| 2019 | National Sport Village, Lima, Peru | (Brazil) Vitor Tavares | 18–21, 21–14, 14–21 | Silver |
| 2023 | Olympic Training Center, Santiago, Chile | (Brazil) Vitor Tavares | 21–19, 21–15 | Gold |

Mixed doubles

| Year | Venue | Partner | Opponent | Score | Result |
|---|---|---|---|---|---|
| 2023 | Olympic Training Center, Santiago, Chile | (United States) Jayci Simon | (Canada) Justin Kendrick (Canada) Colleen Cloetta | 21–5, 21–7 | Gold |
| 2023 | Olympic Training Center, Santiago, Chile | (United States) Jayci Simon | (Argentina) Jonatan Mattos (Argentina) Karina Loyola | 21–4, 21–4 | Gold |
| 2023 | Olympic Training Center, Santiago, Chile | (United States) Jayci Simon | (Peru) Nilton Quispe (Peru) Giuliana Póveda | 21–18, 21–12 | Gold |
| 2023 | Olympic Training Center, Santiago, Chile | (United States) Jayci Simon | (Peru) Jesús Salva (Peru) Rubí Fernández | 21–10, 21–2 | Gold |

=== Pan Am Championships ===
Men's singles

| Year | Venue | Opponent | Score | Result |
|---|---|---|---|---|
| 2016 | Coliseo Municipal de Envigado, Medellín, Colombia | (Peru) Jesús Salva | 21–12, 21–19 | Gold |
| 2018 | Polideportivo 2, Lima, Peru | (Brazil) Vitor Tavares | 13–21, 13–21 | Silver |
| 2022 | Coliseo Alberto León Betancourt, Cali, Colombia | (Peru) Nilton Quispe | 21–16, 21–16 | Gold |

Men's doubles

| Year | Venue | Partner | Opponent | Score | Result |
|---|---|---|---|---|---|
| 2016 (Note: This tournament uses a round robin system.) | Coliseo Municipal de Envigado, Medellín, Colombia | (United States) Danh Trang | (Colombia) Jonatan Sanabria (Brazil) Dhiego Vidal | 21–18, 18–21, 21–19 | Gold |
| 2016 | Coliseo Municipal de Envigado, Medellín, Colombia | (United States) Danh Trang | (Canada) Justin Kendrick (Peru) Jesús Salva | 21–19, 21–19 | Gold |
| 2016 | Coliseo Municipal de Envigado, Medellín, Colombia | (United States) Danh Trang | (Canada) Aaron Keith (Canada) Wyatt Lightfoot | 21–12, 21–9 | Gold |
| 2018 | Polideportivo 2, Lima, Peru | (Brazil) Vitor Tavares | (Peru) Jesús Salva (Brazil) Dhiego Vidal | 21–7, 21–9 | Gold |

Doubles

| Year | Venue | Partner | Opponent | Score | Result |
|---|---|---|---|---|---|
| 2022 (Note: This tournament uses a round robin system.) | Coliseo Alberto León Betancourt, Cali, Colombia | (Brazil) Vitor Tavares | (Peru) Jesús Salva (Peru) Nilton Quispe | 21–5, 20–22, 21–6 | Gold |

Mixed doubles

| Year | Venue | Partner | Opponent | Score | Result |
|---|---|---|---|---|---|
| 2022 (Note: This tournament uses a round robin system.) | Coliseo Alberto León Betancourt, Cali, Colombia | (United States) Jayci Simon | (Canada) Justin Kendrick (Peru) Rosa Velasquez | 21–12, 21–19 | Silver |
| 2022 | Coliseo Alberto León Betancourt, Cali, Colombia | (United States) Jayci Simon | (Argentina) Jonatan Mattos (Argentina) Karina Loyola | 21–15, 21–5 | Silver |
| 2022 | Coliseo Alberto León Betancourt, Cali, Colombia | (United States) Jayci Simon | (Peru) Nilton Quispe (Peru) Giuliana Póveda | 9–21, 21–18, 15–21 | Silver |
| 2022 | Coliseo Alberto León Betancourt, Cali, Colombia | (United States) Jayci Simon | (Peru) Jesús Salva (Peru) Rubí Fernández | 21–17, 21–17 | Silver |

=== International tournaments (3 titles, 3 runners-up) ===
Men's doubles

| Year | Tournament | Partner | Opponent | Score | Result |
|---|---|---|---|---|---|
| 2020 | Peru Para Badminton International | (Peru) Jesús Salva | (France) Fabien Morat (France) Charles Noakes | 20–22, 10–21 | (silver) Runner-up |

Doubles

| Year | Tournament | Partner | Opponent | Score | Result |
|---|---|---|---|---|---|
| 2017 | USA Para Badminton International | (India) Mark Joseph Dharmai | (Japan) Yohei Hatakeyama (Peru) Jesús Salva | 21–16, 21–15 | (gold) Winner |
| 2018 | Brazil Para Badminton International | (Brazil) Vitor Tavares | (India) Mark Joseph Dharmai (Japan) Yohei Hatakeyama | 16–21, 21–17, 21–18 | (gold) Winner |
| 2018 (Note: This tournament uses a round robin system.) | Australia Para Badminton International | (Japan) Yohei Hatakeyama | (Australia) Luke Missen (England) Jonathan Pratt | 21–12, 21–18 | (gold) Winner |
| 2018 | Australia Para Badminton International | (Japan) Yohei Hatakeyama | (Hong Kong) Chu Man Kai (Hong Kong) Wong Chun Yim | 7–21, 7–21 | (gold) Winner |
| 2018 | Australia Para Badminton International | (Japan) Yohei Hatakeyama | (Australia) Kobie Jane Donovan (Australia) Anthony Koedyk | 21–3, 21–5 | (gold) Winner |

Mixed doubles

| Year | Tournament | Partner | Opponent | Score | Result |
|---|---|---|---|---|---|
| 2017 (Note: This tournament uses a round robin system.) | USA Para Badminton International | (United States) Katherine Valli | (United States) Ryan Gioffreda (United States) Colleen Gioffreda | 21–7, 21–14 | (silver) Runner-up |
| 2017 | USA Para Badminton International | (United States) Katherine Valli | (Peru) Jesús Salva (Peru) Giuliana Póveda | 13–21, 14–21 | (silver) Runner-up |
| 2017 | USA Para Badminton International | (United States) Katherine Valli | (United States) Danh Trang (Scotland) Deidre Nagle | 21–7, 21–18 | (silver) Runner-up |
| 2019 | Canada Para Badminton International | (United States) Katherine Valli | (Brazil) Vitor Tavares (Poland) Daria Bujnicka | 16–21, 14–21 | (silver) Runner-up |
