= Jayci Simon =

American para-badminton player (born 2005)

Personal information
- Born: February 13, 2005 (age 21) St. Johns, Michigan, U.S.
- Height: 3 ft 9.75 in (116 cm)

Sport
- Sport: Badminton

Women's singles and doubles SH6
- Highest ranking: 6 (WS January 7, 2020); 2 (WD June 18, 2024)
- Current ranking: 14 (WS); 4 (WD) (August 18, 2024)
Medal record
Para-badminton
Representing the United States
Paralympic Games
Silver medal – second place	2024 Paris	Mixed doubles
World Championships
Silver medal – second place	2026 Manama	Women's doubles
Bronze medal – third place	2024 Pattaya	Mixed doubles
Parapan American Games
Gold medal – first place	2023 Santiago	Mixed Doubles
Silver medal – second place	2023 Santiago	Women's singles
Pan Am Championships
Silver medal – second place	2018 Lima	Women's doubles
Silver medal – second place	2022 Cali	Women's singles
Silver medal – second place	2022 Cali	Mixed doubles
Bronze medal – third place	2018 Lima	Women's singles
Bronze medal – third place	2018 Lima	Mixed doubles

Jayci Simon (born February 13, 2005) is an American para-badminton player. She is a 2023 Parapan American Games gold medalist in mixed doubles, and 2024 BWF Para-Badminton World Championships bronze medalist in mixed doubles. She represented the United States at the 2024 Summer Paralympics and won a silver medal in mixed doubles.

== Early life and education ==
Simon was born to Chad and Amy Simon. She was diagnosed with acromicric dysplasia, a rare form of dwarfism, at seven years old. She attended St. Johns High School in St. Johns, Michigan.

== Career ==
Simon competed at the 2017 World Dwarf Games and medaled in all ten of the events she competed in. She won gold medals in doubles badminton, basketball, the 40-meter run, 60-meter run and the 4x40 relay race. She won silver medals in singles badminton, soccer, shot put and discus and won a bronze medal in the javelin throw. She does not have a regular coach or facility to train at.

Simon made her international debut for the United States at the 2018 Pan American Para-Badminton Championships in Lima, Peru, and won a silver medal in women's doubles and a bronze medals in the women's singles and mixed doubles. She competed at the 2019 BWF Para-Badminton World Championships in Basel, Switzerland, and finished in fifth place in women's singles and women's doubles.

She competed at the 2022 Pan American Para-Badminton Championships in Cali, Colombia, and won silver medals in the women's singles and mixed doubles. She competed at the 2023 Parapan American Games in Santiago, Chile, and won a gold medal in mixed doubles and a silver medal in women's singles.

On April 3, 2024, she qualified to represent the United States at the 2024 Summer Paralympics, along with her mixed doubles partner Miles Krajewski.

== Achievements ==
=== Parapan American Games ===
Mixed doubles

Year	Venue	Partner	Opponent	Score	Result
2023	Olympic Training Center, Santiago, Chile	(United States) Miles Krajewski	(Canada) Justin Kendrick (Canada) Colleen Cloetta	21–5, 21–7	Gold
2023	Olympic Training Center, Santiago, Chile	(United States) Miles Krajewski	(Argentina) Jonatan Mattos (Argentina) Karina Loyola	21–4, 21–4	Gold
2023	Olympic Training Center, Santiago, Chile	(United States) Miles Krajewski	(Peru) Nilton Quispe (Peru) Giuliana Póveda	21–18, 21–12	Gold
2023	Olympic Training Center, Santiago, Chile	(United States) Miles Krajewski	(Peru) Jesús Salva (Peru) Rubí Fernández	21–10, 21–2	Gold

=== Pan Am Championships ===
Mixed doubles

Year	Venue	Partner	Opponent	Score	Result
2022	Coliseo Alberto León Betancourt, Cali, Colombia	(United States) Miles Krajewski	(Canada) Justin Kendrick (Peru) Rosa Velasquez	21–12, 21–19	Silver
2022	Coliseo Alberto León Betancourt, Cali, Colombia	(United States) Miles Krajewski	(Argentina) Jonatan Mattos (Argentina) Karina Loyola	21–15, 21–5	Silver
2022	Coliseo Alberto León Betancourt, Cali, Colombia	(United States) Miles Krajewski	(Peru) Nilton Quispe (Peru) Giuliana Póveda	9–21, 21–18, 15–21	Silver
2022	Coliseo Alberto León Betancourt, Cali, Colombia	(United States) Miles Krajewski	(Peru) Jesús Salva (Peru) Rubí Fernández	21–17, 21–17	Silver
