= Athletics at the 2023 Parapan American Games – Men's 1500 metres T11 =

Men's 1500 metres T11 at the 2023 Parapan American Games
- Venue: Mario Recordón Athletics Training Center
- Dates: November 24 - November 25
- Competitors: 8 from 6 nations
- Winning time: 4:04.32

Medalists
| 1st place, gold medalist(s) | | Júlio Cesar Agripino; Guide: Micael Batista | Brazil |
| 2nd place, silver medalist(s) | | Rosbil Guillen; Guide: Oliver Rojas | Peru |
| 3rd place, bronze medalist(s) | | Alejandro Pacheco; Guide: Fidel Reyes | Mexico |

The men's T11 1500 metres competition of the athletics events at the 2023 Parapan American Games was held on November 24 - 25 at the Mario Recordón Athletics Training Center within the Julio Martínez National Stadium of Santiago, Chile.

== Records ==
Prior to this competition, the existing world and Pan American Games records were as follows:

| World record | Yeltsin Jacques (BRA) | 3:57.60 | Tokyo, Japan | August 31, 2021 |
| Parapan American Games record | Jason Dunkerley (CAN) | 4:07.93 | Rio de Janeiro, Brazil | August 13, 2007 |
| Americas record | Yeltsin Jacques (BRA) | 3:57.60 | Tokyo, Japan | August 31, 2021 |

== Schedule ==
| Date | Time | Round |
|---|---|---|
| November 24, 2023 | 17:57 | Semifinals |
| November 25, 2023 | 19:00 | Final |

== Results ==
All times shown are in seconds.

| KEY: | q | Fastest non-qualifiers | Q | Qualified | PR | Parapan Games record | NR | National record | SB | Seasonal best | DQ | Disqualified |

=== Semifinals ===
The fastest two athletes of each semifinal advance to the final. The results were as follows:

| Rank | Heat | Name | Nationality | Time | Notes |
|---|---|---|---|---|---|
| 1 | 1 | Yeltsin Jacques; Guide: Edelson De Avila | Brazil | 4:15.72 | Q |
| 2 | 2 | Júlio Cesar Agripino; Guide: Micael Batista | Brazil | 4:16.64 | Q |
| 3 | 1 | Rosbil Guillen; Guide: Oliver Rojas | Peru | 4:17.70 | Q |
| 4 | 1 | Alejandro Pacheco; Guide: Fidel Reyes | Mexico | 4:25.35 | q |
| 5 | 2 | Jimmy Caicedo; Guide: Carlos Arrellano | Ecuador | 4:26.94 | Q |
| 6 | 2 | Cristian Valenzuela; Guide: Matías Silva | Chile | 4:41.31 | q |
| 7 | 1 | Daniel Davrieux; Guide: Mariano Battaglia | Uruguay | 4:43.69 | SB |
| 8 | 2 | Leonardo Villafaña; Guide: Pedro Lemus | Mexico | DQ | |

=== Final ===
The results were as follows:

| Rank | Lane | Name | Nationality | Time | Notes |
|---|---|---|---|---|---|
| 1st place, gold medalist(s) | 2 | Júlio Cesar Agripino; Guide: Micael Batista | Brazil | 4:04.32 | PR |
| 2nd place, silver medalist(s) | 3 | Rosbil Guillen; Guide: Oliver Rojas | Peru | 4:15.41 | SB |
| 3rd place, bronze medalist(s) | 4 | Alejandro Pacheco; Guide: Fidel Reyes | Mexico | 4:26.83 | |
| 4 | 6 | Cristian Valenzuela; Guide: Matías Silva | Chile | 4:38.48 | |
| 5 | 5 | Jimmy Caicedo; Guide: Carlos Arrellano | Ecuador | DQ | |
| 6 | 1 | Yeltsin Jacques; Guide: Edelson De Avila | Brazil | DQ | |
