= Mikaela Almeida =

Brazilian para badminton player (born 2003)

Personal information
- Full name: Mikaela da Costa Almeida
- Born: 3 February 2003 (age 23) Manaus, Brazil

Sport
- Country: Brazil
- Sport: Para badminton
Medal record
Para badminton
Representing Brazil
Parapan American Games
Gold medal – first place	2019 Lima	Singles SU5
Gold medal – first place	2023 Santiago	Singles SU5
Pan American Championships
Bronze medal – third place	2018 Lima	Singles SL4-SU5
Bronze medal – third place	2018 Lima	Doubles SL3-SU5
Bronze medal – third place	2018 Lima	Mixed doubles SL3-SU5

Mikaela da Costa Almeida (born 3 February 2003) is a Brazilian para badminton player who competes in international badminton competitions. She is a two-time Parapan American Games champion in singles, she is also a three-time Pan American bronze medalist.
