= Pan American Para-Badminton Championships =

Badminton championships

- Most recent season or competition: 2022 Pan Am Para-Badminton Championships
- Founder: Para Badminton World Federation (now part of the BWF)
- First season: 2010

The Pan American Para-Badminton Championships is a tournament organized by the Para Badminton World Federation (PBWF) which has now merged with the BWF. This tournament is hosted to crown the best para-badminton players in the Americas.

The inaugural edition of the tournament was hosted in Curitiba, Brazil in 2010.

== Championships ==
=== Individual championships ===
The table below states all the host cities (and their countries) of the Pan American Championships.

Year	Number	Host City	Host country	Events
2010	1	Curitiba	Brazil	6
2013	2	Guatemala City	Guatemala	4
2014	3	Havana	Cuba	10
2016	4	Medellín	Colombia	12
2018	5	Lima	Peru	19
2022	6	Cali	Colombia	22
2025	7	São Paulo	Brazil	

== Past winners ==
=== 2010 Curitiba ===
Event	Gold	Silver	Bronze
Men's singles W1–W2	(Brazil) Gabriel Jannini	(Brazil) Gustavo Richter	(Brazil) Jaime Augusto
Men's singles W1–W2	(Brazil) Gabriel Jannini	(Brazil) Gustavo Richter	(Brazil) Carlos Rodrigues
Men's singles W1–W3	(Brazil) Rodrigo Campos Oliveira	(Brazil) Rômulo Soares	(Brazil) Gabriel Jannini
Men's singles W1–W3	(Brazil) Rodrigo Campos Oliveira	(Brazil) Rômulo Soares	(Brazil) Carlos Rodrigues
Men's singles STL1–STL2	(Brazil) Jonathan Cardoso	(Peru) Pedro Pablo de Vinatea	(Brazil) Jônatas Barbosa
Men's singles STL1–STL2	(Brazil) Jonathan Cardoso	(Peru) Pedro Pablo de Vinatea	(Brazil) Luiz Henrique Moreira
Men's singles STL3–STU5	(Guatemala) Raúl Anguiano	(Brazil) Geraldo da Silva Oliveira	(Brazil) Rivaldo Arruda
Men's doubles W1–W3	(Brazil) Rodrigo Campos Oliveira (Brazil) Rômulo Soares	(Brazil) Jaime Augusto (Brazil) Gabriel Jannini	(Brazil) Radolfo Ramos de Oliveira (Brazil) Carlos Rodrigues
Men's doubles STL1–STU5	(Brazil) Jonathan Cardoso (Brazil) Geraldo da Silva Oliveira	(Guatemala) Raúl Anguiano (Guatemala) Danilo Velázquez	(Brazil) Rivaldo Arruda (Brazil) Serafim Uedes de Oliveira

=== 2013 Guatemala City ===
Event	Gold	Silver	Bronze
Men's singles WH1–WH2	(Brazil) Gabriel Jannini	(Brazil) Rômulo Soares	(Brazil) Marcelo Alves Conceição
Men's singles WH1–WH2	(Brazil) Gabriel Jannini	(Brazil) Rômulo Soares	(Colombia) Ariel Prada Vázquez
Singles SL3	(Peru) Pedro Pablo de Vinatea	(Brazil) Leonardo Zuffo	(Dominican Republic) Alexis Muñoz Guerrero
Singles SL3	(Peru) Pedro Pablo de Vinatea	(Brazil) Leonardo Zuffo	(Venezuela) Edwar Ordoñez
Men's singles SU5	(Guatemala) Raúl Anguiano	(Brazil) Geraldo da Silva Oliveira	(Guatemala) David Morales
Men's singles SU5	(Guatemala) Raúl Anguiano	(Brazil) Geraldo da Silva Oliveira	(Brazil) Eduardo Oliveira
Men's doubles SU5	(Guatemala) Raúl Anguiano (Guatemala) David Morales	(Brazil) Eduardo Oliveira (Brazil) Geraldo da Silva Oliveira	(Dominican Republic) Alexis Muñoz Guerrero (Venezuela) Edwar Ordoñez
Men's doubles SU5	(Guatemala) Raúl Anguiano (Guatemala) David Morales	(Brazil) Eduardo Oliveira (Brazil) Geraldo da Silva Oliveira	(Peru) Pedro Pablo de Vinatea (Brazil) Leonardo Zuffo

=== 2014 Havana ===
Event	Gold	Silver	Bronze
Men's singles WH1	(Brazil) Marcelo Alves Conceição	(Brazil) Rodolfo Cano	(Brazil) Carlos Rodrigues
Men's singles WH1	(Brazil) Marcelo Alves Conceição	(Brazil) Rodolfo Cano	(Brazil) Gabriel Jannini
Men's singles WH2	(Brazil) Rômulo Soares	(Cuba) Kadil Najarro Cabrera	(Colombia) Ariel Prada Vázquez
Men's singles WH2	(Brazil) Rômulo Soares	(Cuba) Kadil Najarro Cabrera	(Cuba) Edimir Figueredo Garrido
Men's singles SL3	(Peru) Pedro Pablo de Vinatea	(Brazil) Leonardo Zuffo	(Cuba) Rolando Bello Rodriguez
Men's singles SL3	(Peru) Pedro Pablo de Vinatea	(Brazil) Leonardo Zuffo	(Cuba) Roeldi Beltran Martinez
Singles SL4	(Guatemala) Raúl Anguiano	(Brazil) Johann Breno	(Cuba) Oriel Hernandez Martín
Singles SL4	(Guatemala) Raúl Anguiano	(Brazil) Johann Breno	(Dominican Republic) Christofer Javier Perez Jimenez
Singles SU5	(Suriname) Brian Kliwon	(Brazil) Geraldo da Silva Oliveira	(Cuba) Manuel Alejandro del Rosario Pargas
Singles SU5	(Suriname) Brian Kliwon	(Brazil) Geraldo da Silva Oliveira	(Brazil) Eduardo Oliveira
Doubles WH1–WH2	(Brazil) Marcelo Alves Conceição (Brazil) Rômulo Soares	(Brazil) Rodolfo Cano (Brazil) Gabriel Jannini	(Cuba) Edimir Figueredo Garrido (Brazil) Carlos Rodrigues
Doubles WH1–WH2	(Brazil) Marcelo Alves Conceição (Brazil) Rômulo Soares	(Brazil) Rodolfo Cano (Brazil) Gabriel Jannini	(Cuba) Ismael Bueno Lopez (Cuba) Kadil Najarro Cabrera
Men's doubles SL3–SL4	(Guatemala) Raúl Anguiano (Peru) Pedro Pablo de Vinatea	(Brazil) Johann Breno (Brazil) Leonardo Zuffo	(Cuba) Rolando Bello Rodriguez (Cuba) Roeldi Beltran Martinez
Men's doubles SL3–SL4	(Guatemala) Raúl Anguiano (Peru) Pedro Pablo de Vinatea	(Brazil) Johann Breno (Brazil) Leonardo Zuffo	(Dominican Republic) Christofer Javier Perez Jimenez (Brazil) Luiz Henrique Santos
Doubles SU5	(Brazil) Denival Candido (Brazil) Geraldo da Silva Oliveira	(Suriname) Brian Kliwon (Dominican Republic) Alexis Muñoz Guerrero	(Cuba) Manuel Alejandro del Rosario Pargas (Cuba) Alain Leon Valdes
Doubles SU5	(Brazil) Denival Candido (Brazil) Geraldo da Silva Oliveira	(Suriname) Brian Kliwon (Dominican Republic) Alexis Muñoz Guerrero	(Brazil) Eduardo Oliveira (Cuba) Leosdanis Velazquez Rondon
Women's singles WH2	(Brazil) Francisca Lima	(Chile) Catalina Jimeno	(Cuba) María Mercedes Gonzalez
Women's singles WH2	(Brazil) Francisca Lima	(Chile) Catalina Jimeno	(Cuba) Clara Aurora Echavarria
Mixed doubles WH1–WH2	(Brazil) Marcelo Alves Conceição (Brazil) Francisca Lima	(Cuba) Edimir Figueredo Garrido (Cuba) Clara Aurora Echavarria	(Cuba) Ismael Bueno Lopez (Brazil) María Mercedes Gonzalez
Mixed doubles WH1–WH2	(Brazil) Marcelo Alves Conceição (Brazil) Francisca Lima	(Cuba) Edimir Figueredo Garrido (Cuba) Clara Aurora Echavarria	(Chile) Carlos Araya (Chile) Catalina Jimeno

=== 2016 Medellín ===
Event	Gold	Silver	Bronze
Men's singles WH1	(Brazil) Marcelo Alves Conceição	(Brazil) Rodolfo Cano	(Brazil) Carlos Rodrigues
Men's singles WH1	(Brazil) Marcelo Alves Conceição	(Brazil) Rodolfo Cano	(Brazil) Gabriel Jannini
Men's singles WH2	(Brazil) Rômulo Soares	(Canada) Bernard Lapointe	(Chile) Jaime Aranguiz
Men's singles WH2	(Brazil) Rômulo Soares	(Canada) Bernard Lapointe	(Brazil) Pedro Nogueira
Singles SL3	(Cuba) Rolando Bello Rodriguez	(Peru) Pedro Pablo de Vinatea	(Brazil) Leonardo Zuffo
Singles SL3	(Cuba) Rolando Bello Rodriguez	(Peru) Pedro Pablo de Vinatea	(Brazil) Luiz Santos
Men's singles SL4	(Guatemala) Raúl Anguiano	(Brazil) Rogerio Junior Xavier	(Brazil) Breno Johann
Men's singles SL4	(Guatemala) Raúl Anguiano	(Brazil) Rogerio Junior Xavier	(Canada) Pascal Lapointe
Singles SU5	(Suriname) Brian Kliwon	(Cuba) Manuel Alejandro del Rosario Pargas	(Brazil) Denival Cândido
Singles SU5	(Suriname) Brian Kliwon	(Cuba) Manuel Alejandro del Rosario Pargas	(Brazil) Eduardo Oliveira
Singles SH6	(United States) Miles Krajewski	(Peru) Hector Jesus Salva Tunque	(Brazil) Dhiego Vidal Guimares
Singles SH6	(United States) Miles Krajewski	(Peru) Hector Jesus Salva Tunque	(Peru) Giuliana Póveda
Men's doubles WH1–WH2	(Brazil) Rodolfo Cano (Brazil) Gabriel Jannini	(Brazil) Marcelo Alves Conceição (Brazil) Rômulo Soares	(Chile) Jaime Aranguiz (Chile) Constancio Cancino
Men's doubles WH1–WH2	(Brazil) Rodolfo Cano (Brazil) Gabriel Jannini	(Brazil) Marcelo Alves Conceição (Brazil) Rômulo Soares	(Brazil) Pedro Nogueira (Brazil) Carlos Rodrigues
Men's doubles SL3–SL4	(Cuba) Rolando Bello Rodriguez (Canada) Pascal Lapointe	(Brazil) Johann Breno (Brazil) Leonardo Zuffo	(Guatemala) Raúl Anguiano (Peru) Pedro Pablo de Vinatea
Doubles SU5	(Brazil) Ricardo Cavalli (Brazil) Eduardo Oliveira	(Brazil) Denival Candido (Suriname) Brian Kliwon	(Peru) Esteban Isael Juarez Yangua (Brazil) Genivaldo Duarte da Silva
Doubles SU5	(Brazil) Ricardo Cavalli (Brazil) Eduardo Oliveira	(Brazil) Denival Candido (Suriname) Brian Kliwon	(Cuba) Manuel Alejandro del Rosario Pargas (Brazil) Geraldo da Silva Oliveira
Men's doubles SH6	(United States) Miles Krajewski (United States) Danh Trang	(Colombia) Jonatan Sanabria Moreno (Brazil) Dhiego Vidal Guimares	(Canada) Justin Kendrick (Peru) Hector Jesus Salva Tunque
Men's doubles SH6	(United States) Miles Krajewski (United States) Danh Trang	(Colombia) Jonatan Sanabria Moreno (Brazil) Dhiego Vidal Guimares	(Canada) Aaron Keith (Canada) Wyatt Lightfoot
Women's singles WH2	(Peru) Pilar Jáuregui	(Brazil) Daniele Torres Souza	(Brazil) Maria Gilda
Women's singles WH2	(Peru) Pilar Jáuregui	(Brazil) Daniele Torres Souza	(Chile) Catalina Jimeno
Mixed doubles WH1–WH2	(Brazil) Marcelo Alves Conceição (Brazil) Maria Gilda	(Brazil) Rômulo Soares (Brazil) Daniele Torres Souza	(Peru) Ronald Montero (Peru) Pilar Jáuregui

=== 2018 Lima ===
Event	Gold	Silver	Bronze
Men's singles WH1	(Brazil) Marcelo Alves Conceição	(Brazil) Rodolfo Cano	(Brazil) Osvaldo Crema Junior
Men's singles WH1	(Brazil) Marcelo Alves Conceição	(Brazil) Rodolfo Cano	(Canada) Richard Peter
Men's singles WH2	(Brazil) Julio César Godoy	(Chile) Jaime Aranguiz	(Canada) Bernard Lapointe
Men's singles WH2	(Brazil) Julio César Godoy	(Chile) Jaime Aranguiz	(Brazil) Pedro Nogueira
Men's singles SL3	(Peru) Pedro Pablo de Vinatea	(Brazil) Leonardo Zuffo	(Brazil) Renan Augusto Rosso
Men's singles SL3	(Peru) Pedro Pablo de Vinatea	(Brazil) Leonardo Zuffo	(Canada) William Roussy
Men's singles SL4	(Guatemala) Raúl Anguiano	(Canada) Pascal Lapointe	(Brazil) Breno Johann
Men's singles SL4	(Guatemala) Raúl Anguiano	(Canada) Pascal Lapointe	(Brazil) Rogerio Junior Xavier
Men's singles SU5	(Brazil) Eduardo Oliveira	(Brazil) Ricardo Cavalli	(Venezuela) Kleiber Eduardo Mijares Palacios
Men's singles SU5	(Brazil) Eduardo Oliveira	(Brazil) Ricardo Cavalli	(Brazil) Geraldo da Silva Oliveira
Men's singles SH6	(Brazil) Vitor Tavares	(United States) Miles Krajewski	(Brazil) Dhiego Vidal Guimares
Men's singles SH6	(Brazil) Vitor Tavares	(United States) Miles Krajewski	(Canada) Wyatt Lightfoot
Men's doubles WH1–WH2	(Brazil) Marcelo Alves Conceição (Brazil) Julio César Godoy	(Brazil) Rodolfo Cano (Brazil) Rômulo Soares	(Canada) Bernard Lapointe (Canada) Richard Peter
Men's doubles WH1–WH2	(Brazil) Marcelo Alves Conceição (Brazil) Julio César Godoy	(Brazil) Rodolfo Cano (Brazil) Rômulo Soares	(Brazil) Pedro Nogueira (Brazil) Osvaldo Crema Junior
Men's doubles SL3–SL4	(Brazil) Johann Breno (Brazil) Leonardo Zuffo	(Peru) Renzo Diquez Bances Morales (Peru) Pedro Pablo de Vinatea	(Brazil) Cleto Eugenio (Brazil) Mario Ribeiro
Men's doubles SL3–SL4	(Brazil) Johann Breno (Brazil) Leonardo Zuffo	(Peru) Renzo Diquez Bances Morales (Peru) Pedro Pablo de Vinatea	(Brazil) Jonathan Cardoso (Peru) Pablo Cesar Cueto
Men's doubles SU5	(Brazil) Rogerio Junior Xavier (Brazil) Eduardo Oliveira	(Guatemala) Raúl Anguiano (Canada) Pascal Lapointe	(Brazil) Ricardo Cavalli (Brazil) Geraldo da Silva Oliveira
Men's doubles SH6	(United States) Miles Krajewski (Brazil) Vitor Tavares	(Peru) Hector Jesus Salva Tunque (Brazil) Dhiego Vidal Guimares	(Argentina) Angel Ielpo (Argentina) Jonatan Mattos
Men's doubles SH6	(United States) Miles Krajewski (Brazil) Vitor Tavares	(Peru) Hector Jesus Salva Tunque (Brazil) Dhiego Vidal Guimares	(Canada) Wyatt Lightfoot (United States) Dawson McClure
Women's singles WH1–WH2	(Peru) Pilar Jáuregui	(Canada) Yuka Chokyu	(Brazil) Daniele Torres Souza
Women's singles WH1–WH2	(Peru) Pilar Jáuregui	(Canada) Yuka Chokyu	(Brazil) Auricelia Freitas
Women's singles SL4–SU5	(Brazil) Cintya Oliveira	(Canada) Olivia Meier	(Brazil) Abinaecia Maria da Silva
Women's singles SL4–SU5	(Brazil) Cintya Oliveira	(Canada) Olivia Meier	(Brazil) Mikaela Almeida
Women's singles SH6	(Peru) Giuliana Póveda	(United States) Katherine Valli	(Peru) Rubí Fernández
Women's singles SH6	(Peru) Giuliana Póveda	(United States) Katherine Valli	(United States) Jayci Simon
Women's doubles WH1–WH2	(Canada) Yuka Chokyu (Peru) Pilar Jáuregui	(Brazil) Maria Gilda (Brazil) Auricelia Freitas	(Brazil) Aline de Oliveira Cabral (Brazil) Daniele Torres Souza
Women's doubles SL3–SU5	(Brazil) Abinaecia Maria da Silva (Brazil) Cintya Oliveira	(Canada) Olivia Meier (Peru) Jenny Bertha Ventocilla Huaranga	(Peru) Rosario del Pilar Chavez Rubinos (Brazil) Mikaela Almeida
Women's doubles SH6	(Peru) Giuliana Póveda (United States) Katherine Valli	(United States) Colleen Gioffreda (United States) Jayci Simon	(Peru) Rubí Fernández (Peru) Gabriela Rojas Bautista
Mixed doubles WH1–WH2	(Brazil) Rodolfo Cano (Peru) Pilar Jáuregui	(Brazil) Marcelo Alves Conceição (Brazil) Daniele Torres Souza	(Canada) Bernard Lapointe (Canada) Yuka Chokyu
Mixed doubles WH1–WH2	(Brazil) Rodolfo Cano (Peru) Pilar Jáuregui	(Brazil) Marcelo Alves Conceição (Brazil) Daniele Torres Souza	(Brazil) Rômulo Soares (United States) Amy Burnett
Mixed doubles SL3–SU5	(Canada) Pascal Lapointe (Canada) Olivia Meier	(Brazil) Ricardo Cavalli (Brazil) Abinaecia Maria da Silva	(Brazil) Renan Augusto Rosso (Brazil) Mikaela Almeida
Mixed doubles SL3–SU5	(Canada) Pascal Lapointe (Canada) Olivia Meier	(Brazil) Ricardo Cavalli (Brazil) Abinaecia Maria da Silva	(Brazil) Leonardo Zuffo (Brazil) Cintya Oliveira
Mixed doubles SH6	(Brazil) Vitor Tavares (Peru) Rubí Fernández	(Peru) Hector Jesus Salva Tunque (Peru) Giuliana Póveda	(United States) Dawson McClure (United States) Jayci Simon
Mixed doubles SH6	(Brazil) Vitor Tavares (Peru) Rubí Fernández	(Peru) Hector Jesus Salva Tunque (Peru) Giuliana Póveda	(United States) Ryan Gioffreda (United States) Colleen Gioffreda

=== 2022 Cali ===
Event	Gold	Silver	Bronze
Men's singles WH1	(Brazil) Marcelo Alves	(Brazil) Rodolfo Cano	(Mexico) Joaquin Isaac Palma Piñeiro
Men's singles WH1	(Brazil) Marcelo Alves	(Brazil) Rodolfo Cano	(Mexico) Alfonso Quevedo
Men's singles WH2	(Chile) Jaime Aranguiz	(Brazil) Julio César Godoy	(Brazil) José Ambrosio Chaves Neto
Men's singles WH2	(Chile) Jaime Aranguiz	(Brazil) Julio César Godoy	(Peru) Roberth Nolberto
Men's singles SL3	(Canada) William Roussy	(Peru) Pedro Pablo de Vinatea	(Brazil) Jonathan Cardoso
Men's singles SL3	(Canada) William Roussy	(Peru) Pedro Pablo de Vinatea	(Peru) Albert Manuel
Men's singles SL4	(Brazil) Rogerio Junior Xavier	(Mexico) Maximiliano Avila Sosa	(Peru) Renzo Diquez
Men's singles SL4	(Brazil) Rogerio Junior Xavier	(Mexico) Maximiliano Avila Sosa	(Canada) Pascal Lapointe
Men's singles SU5	(Cuba) Manuel Alejandro	(Brazil) Yuki Roberto	(Brazil) Ricardo Cavalli
Men's singles SU5	(Cuba) Manuel Alejandro	(Brazil) Yuki Roberto	(Brazil) Eduardo Oliveira
Men's singles SH6	(United States) Miles Krajewski	(Peru) Nilton Quispe	(Canada) Emilien Langelier
Men's singles SH6	(United States) Miles Krajewski	(Peru) Nilton Quispe	(Brazil) Vitor Tavares
Men's doubles WH1–WH2	(Brazil) Marcelo Alves (Brazil) Julio César Godoy	(Brazil) Edmar Francisco Barbosa (Brazil) Rodolfo Cano	(Colombia) Victor Aragon (Chile) Jaime Aranguiz
Men's doubles WH1–WH2	(Brazil) Marcelo Alves (Brazil) Julio César Godoy	(Brazil) Edmar Francisco Barbosa (Brazil) Rodolfo Cano	(Mexico) Joaquin Isaac Palma Piñeiro (Mexico) Arturo Zambrano Alejo
Men's doubles SL3–SL4	(Peru) Renzo Diquez (Peru) Pedro Pablo de Vinatea	(Mexico) Maximiliano Avila Sosa (Cuba) Rolando Bello Rodriguez	(Peru) Pablo Cesar Cueto (Peru) Gerson Jair
Men's doubles SL3–SL4	(Peru) Renzo Diquez (Peru) Pedro Pablo de Vinatea	(Mexico) Maximiliano Avila Sosa (Cuba) Rolando Bello Rodriguez	(Canada) Pascal Lapointe (Canada) William Roussy
Men's doubles SU5	(Brazil) Eduardo Oliveira (Brazil) Yuki Roberto	(Brazil) João Gabriel (Brazil) Danilio Santos	(Brazil) Ricardo Cavalli (Cuba) Manuel Alejandro
Men's doubles SU5	(Brazil) Eduardo Oliveira (Brazil) Yuki Roberto	(Brazil) João Gabriel (Brazil) Danilio Santos	(Brazil) Geraldo da Silva Oliveira (Brazil) Genivaldo Duarte
Doubles SH6	(United States) Miles Krajewski (Brazil) Vitor Tavares	(Peru) Nilton Quispe (Peru) Héctor Salva	(Canada) Justin Kendrick (Canada) Wyatt Lightfoot
Doubles SH6	(United States) Miles Krajewski (Brazil) Vitor Tavares	(Peru) Nilton Quispe (Peru) Héctor Salva	(Peru) Rubí Hernandez (Peru) Giuliana Póveda
Women's singles WH1	(Brazil) Daniele Torres	(Brazil) Ana Gomes	(United States) Amy Burnett
Women's singles WH1	(Brazil) Daniele Torres	(Brazil) Ana Gomes	(Brazil) Auricélia Evangelista
Women's singles WH2	(Peru) Pilar Jáuregui	(Brazil) Maria Gilda	(Brazil) Aline de Oliveira Cabral
Women's singles WH2	(Peru) Pilar Jáuregui	(Brazil) Maria Gilda	(Peru) Silva Arizapana
Women's singles SL3	(Brazil) Adriane Spinetti Avila	(Brazil) Abinaecia Maria	(Colombia) Diana Lizeth
Women's singles SL3	(Brazil) Adriane Spinetti Avila	(Brazil) Abinaecia Maria	(Colombia) Luz Elena Ubaque
Women's singles SL4	(Brazil) Ana Carolina	(Brazil) Edwarda Dias	(Brazil) Danielle Carvalho
Women's singles SL4	(Brazil) Ana Carolina	(Brazil) Edwarda Dias	(Peru) Jenny Ventocilla
Women's singles SU5	(Peru) Diana Rojas Golac	(Peru) Kelly Edith	(Brazil) Laura Fernandes
Women's singles SU5	(Peru) Diana Rojas Golac	(Peru) Kelly Edith	(Cuba) Laura Yanes Carbrera
Women's singles SH6	(Peru) Giuliana Póveda	(United States) Jayci Simon	(Peru) Rubí Hernandez
Women's doubles WH1–WH2	(Peru) Jaqueline Karina (Peru) Pilar Jáuregui	(Brazil) Maria Gilda (Brazil) Auricélia Evangelista	(Brazil) Ana Gomes (Brazil) Daniele Torres
Women's doubles SL3–SU5	(Brazil) Ana Carolina (Brazil) Abinaecia Maria	(Peru) Flor Maria Del Milagro (Peru) Diana Rojas Golac	(Brazil) Danielle Carvalho (Brazil) Carolina Roncato
Women's doubles SL3–SU5	(Brazil) Ana Carolina (Brazil) Abinaecia Maria	(Peru) Flor Maria Del Milagro (Peru) Diana Rojas Golac	(Mexico) Maria Guadalupe (Peru) Jenny Ventocilla
Mixed doubles WH1–WH2	(Brazil) Rodolfo Cano (Peru) Pilar Jáuregui	(Brazil) José Ambrosio (Brazil) Auricélia Evangelista	(Peru) Roberth Nolberto (Peru) Jaqueline Karina
Mixed doubles WH1–WH2	(Brazil) Rodolfo Cano (Peru) Pilar Jáuregui	(Brazil) José Ambrosio (Brazil) Auricélia Evangelista	(Chile) Jaime Aranguiz (Brazil) Ana Gomes
Mixed doubles SL3–SU5	(Brazil) Rogerio Junior Xavier (Brazil) Edwarda Dias	(Peru) Renzo Diquez (Peru) Jenny Ventocilla	(Brazil) João Gabriel (Brazil) Abinaecia Maria
Mixed doubles SL3–SU5	(Brazil) Rogerio Junior Xavier (Brazil) Edwarda Dias	(Peru) Renzo Diquez (Peru) Jenny Ventocilla	(Brazil) Yuki Roberto (Brazil) Adriane Spinetti Avila
Mixed doubles SH6	(Peru) Nilton Quispe (Peru) Giuliana Póveda	(United States) Miles Krajewski (United States) Jayci Simon	(Peru) Héctor Salva (Peru) Rubí Hernandez

== See also ==
- Pan American Badminton Championships
- Pan Am Junior Badminton Championships
