= Vitor Tavares =

Brazilian para-badminton player

Personal information
- Born: Vitor Gonçalves Tavares; 7 March 1999 (age 27) Curitiba, Brazil
- Height: 1.40 m (4 ft 7 in)

Sport
- Country: Brazil
- Sport: Badminton
- Handedness: Right

Men's singles and doubles SH6
- Highest ranking: 2 (MS 4 July 2022); 1 (MD with Miles Krajewski 20 April 2023); 2 (XD with Rubí Fernández 1 January 2019)
- Current ranking: 2 (MS); 4 (MD with Miles Krajewski) (3 September 2024)
- BWF profile
Medal record
Men's para-badminton
Representing Brazil
Paralympic Games
Bronze medal – third place	2024 Paris	Men's singles
World Championships
Silver medal – second place	2022 Tokyo	Men's doubles
Bronze medal – third place	2019 Basel	Men's singles
Bronze medal – third place	2019 Basel	Men's doubles
Bronze medal – third place	2019 Basel	Mixed doubles
Bronze medal – third place	2022 Tokyo	Men's singles
Bronze medal – third place	2024 Pattaya	Men's singles
Bronze medal – third place	2024 Pattaya	Men's doubles
Bronze medal – third place	2026 Manama	Men's doubles
Parapan American Games
Gold medal – first place	2019 Lima	Men's singles
Silver medal – second place	2023 Santiago	Men's singles
Pan Am Championships
Gold medal – first place	2018 Lima	Men's singles
Gold medal – first place	2018 Lima	Men's doubles
Gold medal – first place	2018 Lima	Mixed doubles
Bronze medal – third place	2022 Cali	Men's singles
South American Championships
Gold medal – first place	2018 Lima	Men's singles
Gold medal – first place	2018 Lima	Men's doubles

Vitor Gonçalves Tavares (born 7 March 1999) is a Brazilian para badminton player who competes in international badminton competitions. He is a five-time World medalist and is a Parapan American Games champion. He competed at the 2020 Summer Paralympics where he reached the bronze medal match in the men's singles SH6 but lost to Krysten Coombs.

== Achievements ==
=== Paralympic Games ===
Men's singles SH6

Year	Venue	Opponent	Score	Result
2024	Porte de La Chapelle Arena, Paris, France	(Hong Kong) Chu Man Kai	23–21, 16–21, 21–12	Bronze

=== World Championships ===
Men's singles

Year	Venue	Opponent	Score	Result
2019	St. Jakobshalle, Basel, Switzerland	(Hong Kong) Wong Chun Yim	13–21, 16–21	Bronze
2022	Yoyogi National Gymnasium, Tokyo, Japan	(England) Jack Shephard	14–21, 20–22	Bronze
2024	Pattaya Exhibition and Convention Hall, Pattaya, Thailand	(India) Krishna Nagar	16–21, 17–21	Bronze

Men's doubles

Year	Venue	Partner	Opponent	Score	Result
2019	St. Jakobshalle, Basel, Switzerland	(United States) Miles Krajewski	(Hong Kong) Chu Man Kai (Hong Kong) Wong Chun Yim	13–21, 16–21	Bronze
2022	Yoyogi National Gymnasium, Tokyo, Japan	(United States) Miles Krajewski	(South Korea) Lee Dae-sung (Thailand) Natthapong Meechai	21–19, 11–21, 15–21	Silver
2024	Pattaya Exhibition and Convention Hall, Pattaya, Thailand	(United States) Miles Krajewski	(China) Lin Naili (China) Zeng Qingtao	9–21, 12–21	Bronze

Mixed doubles

Year	Venue	Partner	Opponent	Score	Result
2019	St. Jakobshalle, Basel, Switzerland	(Peru) Rubí Fernández	(Scotland) Robert Laing (England) Rebecca Bedford	11–21, 25–23, 21–23	Bronze

=== Parapan American Games ===
Men's singles SH6

Year	Venue	Opponent	Score	Result
2019	National Sport Village, Lima, Peru	(United States) Miles Krajewski	21–18, 14–21, 21–14	Gold
2023	Olympic Training Center, Santiago, Chile	(United States) Miles Krajewski	19–21, 15–21	Silver

=== Pan Am Championships ===
Men's singles SH6

Year	Venue	Opponent	Score	Result
2018	National Sport Village, Lima, Peru	(United States) Miles Krajewski	21–13, 21–13	Gold
2022	Coliseo Alberto León Betancur, Cali, Colombia	(United States) Miles Krajewski	21–12, 14–21, 18–21	Bronze

Men's doubles SH6

Year	Venue	Partner	Opponent	Score	Result
2018	National Sport Village, Lima, Peru	(United States) Miles Krajewski	(Brazil) Dhiego Vidal Guimarães (Peru) Jesús Salva	21–7, 21–9	Gold

Mixed doubles SH6

Year	Venue	Partner	Opponent	Score	Result
2018	National Sport Village, Lima, Peru	(Peru) Rubí Fernández	(Peru) Jesús Salva (Peru) Giuliana Póveda	21–12, 21–19	Gold

=== South American Championships ===
Men's singles SH6

Year	Venue	Opponent	Score	Result
2018	Polideportivo 2 de la Videna, Lima, Peru	(Peru) Jesús Salva	21–8, 21–10	Gold

Men's doubles SH6

Year	Venue	Partner	Opponent	Score	Result
2018	Polideportivo 2 de la Videna, Lima, Peru	(Peru) Jesús Salva	(Argentina) Angel Ielpo (Argentina) Jonatan Mattos	21–4, 21–8	Gold
2018	Polideportivo 2 de la Videna, Lima, Peru	(Peru) Jesús Salva	(Chile) Cristóbal Brunet (Chile) David López	21–8, 21–7	Gold
2018	Polideportivo 2 de la Videna, Lima, Peru	(Peru) Jesús Salva	(Chile) Brayan Abarca (Peru) Nilton Quispe	21–8, 21–2	Gold

=== BWF Para Badminton World Circuit (4 titles, 6 runners-up) ===
The BWF Para Badminton World Circuit – Grade 2, Level 1, 2 and 3 tournaments has been sanctioned by the Badminton World Federation from 2022.

Men's singles SH6

Year	Tournament	Level	Opponent	Score	Result
2022	Spanish Para Badminton International II	Level 2	(India) Krishna Nagar	26–24, 17–21, 9–21	(silver) Runner-up
2022	Brazil Para Badminton International	Level 2	(France) Charles Noakes	15–21, 21–16, 21–19	(gold) Winner
2022	Canada Para Badminton International	Level 1	(England) Jack Shephard	17–21, 10–21	(silver) Runner-up
2023	Spanish Para Badminton International I	Level 1	(France) Charles Noakes	20–22, 21–19, 21–10	(gold) Winner
2023	Brazil Para Badminton International	Level 2	(Hong Kong) Chu Man Kai	22–20, 12–21, 11–21	(silver) Runner-up
2023	Western Australia Para Badminton International	Level 2	(Hong Kong) Wong Chun Yim	22–20, 21–8	(gold) Winner
2024	Spanish Para Badminton International I	Level 1	(Hong Kong) Chu Man Kai	18–21, 14–21	(silver) Runner-up

Men's doubles SH6

Year	Tournament	Level	Partner	Opponent	Score	Result
2023	Spanish Para Badminton International II	Level 2	(United States) Miles Krajewski	(India) Dhinagaran Pandurangan (India) Sivarajan Solaimalai	Walkover	(gold) Winner
2023	Spanish Para Badminton International II	Level 2	(United States) Miles Krajewski	(Canada) Justin Kendrick (Canada) Wyatt Lightfoot	21–7, 21–19	(gold) Winner
2023	Spanish Para Badminton International II	Level 2	(United States) Miles Krajewski	(France) Maxime Greboval (Spain) Iván Segura	21–13, 21–17	(gold) Winner
2023	Spanish Para Badminton International II	Level 2	(United States) Miles Krajewski	(Peru) Nilton Quispe (Peru) Jesús Salva	21–13, 21–12	(gold) Winner
2023	Spanish Para Badminton International II	Level 2	(United States) Miles Krajewski	(South Korea) Lee Dae-sung (Thailand) Natthapong Meechai	14–21, 13–21	(silver) Runner-up
2023	Canada Para Badminton International	Level 1	(United States) Miles Krajewski	(Canada) Justin Kendrick (Canada) Wyatt Lightfoot	21–9, 21–12	(silver) Runner-up
2023	Canada Para Badminton International	Level 1	(United States) Miles Krajewski	(India) Krishna Nagar (India) Sivarajan Solaimalai	24–26, 17–21	(silver) Runner-up
2023	Canada Para Badminton International	Level 1	(United States) Miles Krajewski	(Peru) Nilton Quispe (Peru) Jesús Salva	21–12, 22–20	(silver) Runner-up

=== International tournaments (from 2011–2021) (6 titles, 1 runner-up) ===
Men's singles SH6

Year	Tournament	Opponent	Score	Result
2017	Peru Para Badminton International	(Japan) Yohei Hatakeyama	21–12, 21–16	(gold) Winner
2018	Brazil Para Badminton International	(Japan) Yohei Hatakeyama	21–9, 21–13	(gold) Winner
2020	Brazil Para Badminton International	(India) Krishna Nagar	21–18, 21–19	(gold) Winner
2020	Peru Para Badminton International	(India) Krishna Nagar	21–17, 14–21, 13–21	(silver) Runner-up

Mixed doubles SH6

Year	Tournament	Partner	Opponent	Score	Result
2019	Indonesia Para Badminton International	(Peru) Rubí Fernández	(Peru) Jesús Salva (Peru) Giuliana Póveda	21–15, 21–16	(gold) Winner
2019	Canada Para Badminton Championships	(Poland) Daria Bujnicka	(United States) Miles Krajewski (United States) Katherine Valli	21–16, 21–14	(gold) Winner
2019	Turkish Para Badminton International	(Poland) Oliwia Szmigiel	(India) Krishna Nagar (Poland) Maria Bartusz	19–21, 24–22, 21–16	(gold) Winner
