= Badminton at the 2023 Parapan American Games =

Badminton competitions at the 2023 Parapan American Games

- Badminton pictogram
- Venue: Olympic Training Center
- Dates: 22 – 26 November
- No. of events: 16 (7 men, 7 women, 2 mixed)
- Competitors: 100 from 13 nations

Badminton competitions at the 2023 Parapan American Games in Santiago, Chile, were held from 22 to 26 November. It was the second appearance of badminton in the Parapan Games. The event acted as a qualifier to add points on the Road to Paris 2024 qualification.

== Participating nations ==
There are 100 players from 13 nations participating.

- Argentina (6)
- Barbados (2)
- Brazil (31)
- Canada (9)
- Chile (6) (Host)
- Colombia (5)
- Cuba (4)
- Dominican Republic (3)
- Guatemala (1)
- Mexico (7)
- Peru (21)
- United States (4)
- Venezuela (1)

== Medal summary ==
=== Medal table ===
* Host nation (Chile)

Rank	NPC	Gold	Silver	Bronze	Total
1	Brazil (BRA)	9	9	3	21
2	Peru (PER)	4	3	9	16
3	United States (USA)	2	1	0	3
4	Chile (CHI)*	1	0	0	1
5	Canada (CAN)	0	1	3	4
6	Cuba (CUB)	0	1	0	1
6	Mexico (MEX)	0	1	0	1
8	Colombia (COL)	0	0	1	1
Totals (8 entries)		16	16	16	48

=== Medalists ===
==== Singles events ====
Event	Class	Gold	Silver	Bronze
Men's singles	WH1	Marcelo Conceição; Brazil	Rodolfo Cano; Brazil	Victor Aragon Dominguez; Colombia
Men's singles	WH2	Jaime Aránguiz; Chile	Júlio Godoy; Brazil	Bernard Lapointe; Canada
Men's singles	SL3	Pedro Pablo de Vinatea; Peru	William Roussy; Canada	Gerson Vargas; Peru
Men's singles	SL4	Rogério de Oliveira; Brazil	Maximiliano Ávila; Mexico	Breno Johann; Brazil
Men's singles	SU5	Yuki Rodrigues; Brazil	Manuel Del Rosario Pargas; Cuba	Jairo Aranguri; Peru
Men's singles	SH6	Miles Krajewski; United States	Vitor Tavares; Brazil	Nilton Quispe; Peru
Women's singles	WH1	Daniele Souza; Brazil	Jaquelin Burgos; Peru	Yuka Chokyu; Canada
Women's singles	WH2	Pilar Jáuregui; Peru	Maria Gilda Atunes; Brazil	Denith Silva; Peru
Women's singles	SL3	Abinaecia Silva; Brazil	Kauana Beckenkamp; Brazil	Adriane Ávila; Brazil
Women's singles	SL4	Ana Carolina Reis; Brazil	Edwarda Dias; Brazil	Olivia Meier; Canada
Women's singles	SU5	Mikaela Almeida; Brazil	Diana Rojas; Peru	Kelly Ari; Peru
Women's singles	SH6	Giuliana Póveda; Peru	Jayci Simon; United States	Rubí Fernández; Canada

==== Doubles events ====
Event	Class	Gold	Silver	Bronze
Men's doubles	WH1–WH2	Brazil; Júlio Godoy; Marcelo Conceição	Brazil; Edmar Barbosa; Rodolfo Cano	Peru; Fernando Vilcachagua; Roberth Fajardo
Women's doubles	WH1–WH2	Peru; Pilar Jáuregui; Jaquelin Burgos	Brazil; Ana Gomes; Daniele Souza	Brazil; Maria Gilda Antunes; Auricélia Evangelista
Mixed doubles	SL3–SU5	Brazil; Edwarda Dias; Rogério de Oliveira	Brazil; Adriane Ávila; Yuki Rodrigues	Peru; Jenny Ventocilla; Renzo Bances
Mixed doubles	SH6	United States; Jayci Simon; Miles Krajewski	Peru; Giuliana Póveda; Nilton Quispe	Peru; Rubí Fernández; Jesús Salva

== See also ==
- Badminton at the 2023 Pan American Games
- Badminton at the 2024 Summer Paralympics
