= Adriane Ávila =

Brazilian para badminton player

Personal information
- Born: 10 February 1971 (age 55) São Paulo, Brazil

Sport
- Sport: Para badminton
Medal record
Representing Brazil
Parapan American Games
Silver medal – second place	2023 Santiago	Doubles SL3-SU5
Bronze medal – third place	2023 Santiago	Singles SL3
Pan American Championships
Gold medal – first place	2022 Cali	Singles SL3
Silver medal – second place	2022 Cali	Mixed doubles SL3-SU5

Adriane Spinetti Ávila (born 10 February 1971) is a Brazilian para badminton player who competes in international badminton competitions. She is a Pan American Championships champion and a two-time Parapan American Games medalist. She was born with a left leg deformity.
