= Raúl Anguiano (para-badminton) =

Guatemalan para-badminton player

Personal information
- Full name: Raúl Eduardo Anguiano Araujo
- Born: 16 May 1975 (age 51) Guatemala City, Guatemala
- Height: 1.78 m (5 ft 10 in)

Sport
- Country: Guatemala
- Sport: Para-badminton
- Retired: 2024
Medal record
Para-badminton
Representing Guatemala
Parapan American Games
Gold medal – first place	2019 Lima	Singles SL4
Pan American Championships
Gold medal – first place	2010 Curitiba	Singles STL3-STU5
Gold medal – first place	2013 Guatemala City	Singles SU5
Gold medal – first place	2013 Guatemala City	Doubles SU5
Gold medal – first place	2014 Havana	Singles SL4
Gold medal – first place	2014 Havana	Doubles SL3-SL4
Gold medal – first place	2016 Medellin	Singles SL4
Gold medal – first place	2018 Lima	Singles SL4
Silver medal – second place	2010 Curitiba	Doubles STL1-STU5
Silver medal – second place	2018 Lima	Doubles SU5
Bronze medal – third place	2016 Medellin	Doubles SL3-SL4

Raúl Eduardo Anguiano Araujo (born 16 May 1975) is a Guatemalan retired para-badminton player who competes in international badminton competitions. He is a seven-time Pan American champion and he won Guatemala's first ever Parapan American Games title in 2019, he was voted Americas Athlete of 2019 following his victory.
