= Pedro Pablo de Vinatea =

Peruvian para-badminton player

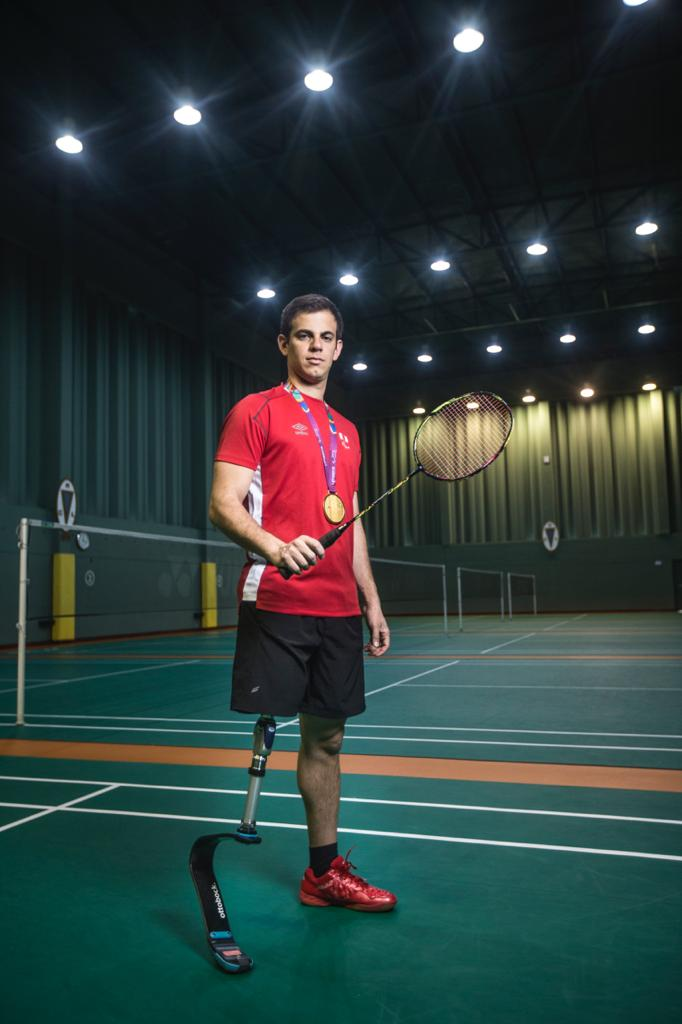

Personal information
- Full name: Pedro Pablo de Vinatea Estrada
- Born: 14 July 1987 (age 38) Lima, Peru
- Spouse: Sofia diez-canseco hernandez

Sport
- Sport: Badminton
- BWF profile
Medal record
Para-badminton
Representing Peru
World Championships
Bronze medal – third place	2011 Guatemala City	Singles STL2
Parapan American Games
Gold medal – first place	2019 Lima	Singles SL3
Gold medal – first place	2023 Santiago	Singles SL3
Pan American Championships
Gold medal – first place	2013 Guatemala City	Singles SL3
Gold medal – first place	2014 Havana	Singles SL3
Gold medal – first place	2014 Havana	Doubles SL3-SL4
Gold medal – first place	2018 Lima	Singles SL3
Gold medal – first place	2022 Cali	Doubles SL3-SL4
Silver medal – second place	2010 Curitiba	Singles STL1-STL2
Silver medal – second place	2016 Medellin	Singles SL3
Silver medal – second place	2018 Lima	Doubles SL3-SL4
Silver medal – second place	2022 Cali	Singles SL3
Bronze medal – third place	2013 Guatemala City	Doubles SU5
Bronze medal – third place	2016 Medellin	Doubles SL3-SL4

Pedro Pablo de Vinatea Estrada (Note: In this Spanish name, the first or paternal surname is de Vinatea and the second or maternal family name is Estrada.) (born 14 July 1987) is a Peruvian para-badminton player who competes in international badminton competitions. He is a World bronze medalist, two-time Parapan American Games champion and a five-time Pan American champion. He is also an Ottobock ambassador for para-badminton in Peru by encouraging children and people with disabilities to play the sport as well as getting para-badminton to be recognised as an official sport at the 2019 Parapan American Games where he won the gold medal.

De Vinatea started playing badminton aged 10, he was diagnosed with osteosarcoma aged fourteen and had his right leg amputated.
