= Edwarda Dias =

Brazilian paralympic sitting volleyball player (born 1999)

Personal information
- Born: 22 April 1999 (age 27); Suzano, Brazil
Honours
Women's sitting volleyball
Representing Brazil
Paralympic Games
Bronze medal – third place	2016 Rio	Team competition
Bronze medal – third place	2020 Tokyo	Team competition
World Championship
Gold medal – first place	2022 Sarajevo	Team
Para-badminton
Representing Brazil
Parapan American Games
Gold medal – first place	2023 Santiago	Mixed doubles SL3–SU5
Silver medal – second place	2023 Santiago	Women's singles SL4

Edwarda de Oliveira Dias (born 22 April 1999) is a Brazilian Paralympic volleyball player. She won the bronze medal playing for the Brazilian Women's National Team in sitting volleyball at the 2016 Summer Paralympics in Rio de Janeiro. This was the first medal for Brazil in sitting volleyball at the Paralympics.

Dias represented Brazil at the 2020 Paralympics in Tokyo, playing as a striker, setter, central, midfielder, and winger in the national sitting volleyball team. At the Tokyo 2020 Paralympic Games, the Brazilian Women's National Team in sitting volleyball, where Dias was one of the key players, won the bronze medal again, following their win over Canada 3–1 at Makuhari Messe Hall.

In February 2022, Dias, along with other members of the Brazilian women's sitting volleyball team, trained at the Paralympic Training Center in São Paulo to prepare for the Paris 2024 cycle.
