= Rubí Fernández =

Peruvian para-badminton player (born 2002)

Personal information
- Born: 22 June 2002 (age 24) Lima, Peru

Sport
- Sport: Para-badminton
Medal record
Representing Peru
World Championships
Gold medal – first place	2022 Tokyo	Women's doubles SH6
Bronze medal – third place	2019 Basel	Mixed doubles SS6
Bronze medal – third place	2024 Bangkok	Women's doubles SH6
Pan American Championships
Gold medal – first place	2018 Lima	Mixed doubles SH6
Bronze medal – third place	2018 Lima	Women's singles SH6
Bronze medal – third place	2018 Lima	Women's doubles SH6
Bronze medal – third place	2022 Cali	Women's singles SH6
Bronze medal – third place	2022 Cali	Mixed doubles SH6
Parapan American Games
Bronze medal – third place	2023 Santiago	Women's singles SH6
Bronze medal – third place	2023 Santiago	Mixed doubles SH6

Rubí Milagros Fernández Vargas (born 22 June 2002) is a Peruvian para-badminton player who competes in international badminton competitions. She is a double World champion in the women's doubles with Giuliana Póveda and a Pan American champion in mixed doubles with Vitor Tavares. She competed at the 2024 Summer Paralympics but did not medal.
