= Canada at the 2023 Parapan American Games =

- Flag of Canada
- IPC code: CAN
- NPC: Canadian Paralympic Committee
- Website: www.paralympic.org/canada

in Santiago, Chile November 17, 2023 – November 26, 2023
- Competitors: 136 in 14 sports
- Flag bearers: Rob Shaw; Shelley Gautier
- Officials: 52
- Medals Ranked 8th: Gold 9 Silver 15 Bronze 28 Total 52

Parapan American Games appearances (overview)
- 1999; 2003; 2007; 2011; 2015; 2019; 2023

Canada is scheduled to compete in the 2023 Parapan American Games in Santiago, Chile from 17 November to 26 November 2023. The country was represented by 136 competitors in 14 sports at the 2023 games.

Wheelchair tennis player Rob Shaw and paralympic cyclist Shelley Gautier were the country's flagbearers during the opening ceremony.

The Canadian team did not compete in the sports of football 5-a-side (blind football), powerlifting and taekwondo.

== Medalists ==
The following Canadian competitors won medals at the games. In the by discipline sections below, medalists' names are bolded.

Medal	Name	Sport	Event	Date
Gold	Ruby Stevens	Swimming	Women's 100 metre backstroke S6	November 18
Gold	Alexandre Hayward	Cycling	Men's road time trial C1–5	November 19
Gold	Nathan Clement	Cycling	Mixed road time trial T1–2	November 19
Gold	Alison Levine	Boccia	Women's individual BC4	November 22
Gold	Anthony Bouchard	Athletics	Men's 100 metres T52	November 23
Gold	Alexandre Hayward	Cycling	Men's individual pursuit C1–3	November 24
Gold	Melissa Pemble-Chubb-Higgins	Cycling	Women's individual pursuit C1–3	November 24
Gold	Canada women's national goalball team: Whitney Bogart; Meghan Mahon; Emma-leigh Heather; Tracy Baldock; Amy Burk; Maryam Salehizadeh	Goalball	Women's tournament	November 24
Gold	Alison Levine; Iulian Ciobanu	Boccia	Mixed pairs BC4	November 25
Silver	Fernando Lu	Swimming	Men's 50 metre freestyle S10	November 18
Silver	Michael Barber	Athletics	Men's 1500 metres T20	November 21
Silver	Liam Stanley	Athletics	Men's 1500 metres T38	November 21
Silver	Jesse Zesseu	Athletics	Men's discus throw T37/38	November 21
Silver	Lance Cryderman	Boccia	Men's individual BC1	November 22
Silver	Danik Allard	Boccia	Men's individual BC2	November 22
Silver	Tyson MacDonald	Swimming	Men's 200 metre individual medley SM14	November 22
Silver	Melissa Pemble-Chubb-Higgins	Cycling	Women's individual time trial C1–5	November 23
Silver	Canada national wheelchair rugby team: Rio Kanda Kovac; Travis Murao; Byron Green; Mike Whitehead; Cody Caldwell; Trevor Hirschfield; Patrice Dagenais; Patrice Simard; Anthony Létourneau; Matthew Debly; Zak Madell; Eric Furtado Rodrigues	Wheelchair rugby	Mixed tournament	November 23
Silver	Keely Shaw	Cycling	Women's individual pursuit C4–5	November 24
Silver	Canada women's national wheelchair basketball team: Rosalie Lalonde; Élodie Tessier; Arinn Young; Cindy Ouellet; Tamara Steeves; Puisand Lai; Tara Llanes; Bethany Johnson; Kady Dandeneau; Sofia Fassi Fehri; Melanie Hawtin; Desiree Isaac Pictou	Wheelchair basketball	Women's tournament	November 24
Silver	Robert Shaw	Wheelchair tennis	Quad singles	November 24
Silver	Kristyn Collins; Danik Allard; Lance Cryderman	Boccia	Mixed team BC1–BC2	November 25
Silver	William Roussy	Badminton	Men's singles SL3	November 26
Silver	Alexandre Hayward	Cycling	Men's road race C1–3	November 26
Bronze	Tyson MacDonald	Swimming	Men's 200 metre freestyle S14	November 18
Bronze	Stephanie Chan	Table tennis	Women's individual C6–7	November 18
Bronze	Michael Sametz	Cycling	Men's road time trial C1–5	November 19
Bronze	Charles Moreau	Cycling	Men's road time trial H1–5	November 19
Bronze	Tyson MacDonald	Swimming	Men's 100 metre backstroke S14	November 19
Bronze	Emma Van Dyk	Swimming	Women's 100 metre backstroke S14	November 19
Bronze	Jordan Tucker	Swimming	Women's 50 metre butterfly S5	November 20
Bronze	Anthony Bouchard	Athletics	Men's 400 metres T52	November 21
Bronze	Kyle Tremblay	Archery	Men's individual compound open	November 22
Bronze	Noah Vucsics	Athletics	Men's long jump T20	November 22
Bronze	Sheriauna Haase	Athletics	Women's 200 metres T47	November 22
Bronze	Iulian Ciobanu	Boccia	Men's individual BC4	November 22
Bronze	Fernando Lu	Swimming	Men's 100 metre butterfly S10	November 22
Bronze	Alexandre Hayward	Cycling	Men's individual time trial C1–5	November 23
Bronze	Jagdev Gill	Swimming	Men's 100 metre freestyle S10	November 23
Bronze	Jesse Zesseu	Athletics	Men's long jump T37/38	November 24
Bronze	Renee Foessel	Athletics	Women's discus throw F38	November 24
Bronze	Michael Sametz	Cycling	Men's individual pursuit C1–3	November 24
Bronze	Canada men's national goalball team: Ahmad Zeividavi; Steven Brice Parker; Aaron Prevost; Lorne Blair Nesbitt; Allen Douglas Ripley; Jeffrey Scott	Goalball	Men's tournament	November 24
Bronze	Justine Morrier	Swimming	Women's 100 metre butterfly S14	November 24
Bronze	Sheriauna Haase	Athletics	Women's 100 metres T47	November 25
Bronze	Tianna Rissling	Athletics	Women's long jump T36/37/38	November 25
Bronze	Charlotte Bolton	Athletics	Women's discus throw F41	November 25
Bronze	Olivia Meier	Badminton	Women's singles SL4	November 25
Bronze	Canada men's national wheelchair basketball team: Nikola Goncin; Garret Ostepchuk; Robert Hedges; Vincent Dallaire; Blaise Mutware; Colin Higgins; Lee Melymic; Chad Jassmann; Patrick Anderson; Jonathan Vermette; Tyler Miller; Reed De'Aeth	Wheelchair basketball	Men's tournament	November 25
Bronze	Bernard Lapointe	Badminton	Men's singles WH2	November 26
Bronze	Yuka Chokyu	Badminton	Women's singles WH1	November 26
Bronze	Nathan Clement	Cycling	Mixed road race T1–2	November 26

Medals by sport/discipline
Sport	1st place, gold medalist(s)	2nd place, silver medalist(s)	3rd place, bronze medalist(s)	Total
Cycling	4	3	5	**12**
Boccia	2	3	1	**6**
Athletics	1	3	8	**12**
Swimming	1	2	7	**10**
Goalball	1	0	1	**2**
Badminton	0	1	3	**4**
Wheelchair basketball	0	1	1	**2**
Wheelchair tennis	0	1	0	**1**
Wheelchair rugby	0	1	0	**1**
Archery	0	0	1	**1**
Table tennis	0	0	1	**1**
**Total**	**9**	**15**	**28**	**52**

Medals by day
Day	1st place, gold medalist(s)	2nd place, silver medalist(s)	3rd place, bronze medalist(s)	Total
18 November	1	1	2	4
19 November	2	0	4	6
20 November	0	0	1	1
21 November	0	3	1	4
22 November	1	3	5	9
23 November	1	2	2	5
24 November	3	3	5	11
25 November	1	1	5	7
26 November	0	2	3	5
**Total**	**9**	**15**	**28**	**52**

Medals by gender
**Gender**	1st place, gold medalist(s)	2nd place, silver medalist(s)	3rd place, bronze medalist(s)	**Total**
Male	3	9	16	28
Female	4	3	11	18
Mixed	2	3	1	6
**Total**	**9**	**15**	**28**	**52**

== Competitors ==
The following is the list of number of competitors (per gender) participating at the games in each sport/discipline.

Sport	Men	Women	Total
Archery	1	0	1
Athletics	9	7	16
Badminton	6	3	9
Boccia	5	3	8
Cycling	4	3	7
Goalball	6	6	12
Judo	1	1	2
Shooting	1	1	2
Football 7-a-side	14	—N/a	14
Swimming	8	6	14
Table tennis	4	1	5
Wheelchair basketball	12	12	24
Wheelchair rugby	12	0	12
Wheelchair tennis	4	2	6
Total	89	47	136

== Archery ==
Canada qualified one athlete to the games and nominated Kyle Tremblay to the role on September 12, 2023.

Men

Athlete	Event	Ranking Round		Round of 16	Quarterfinals	Semifinals	Final / BM	
Athlete	Event	Score	Seed	Opposition Score	Opposition Score	Opposition Score	Opposition Score	Rank
Kyle Tremblay	Individual compound open	683	2	Bye	Villavicencio (ECU); W 139–126	Quesada (CRC); L 152–153	Bronze medal final Sardina (MEX); W 142–142	3rd place, bronze medalist(s)

== Athletics ==
The athletics team received a collective 13 medals and set 3 national records. Sheriauna Haase, the youngest Canadian athletics competitor at the 2023 Games, won the bronze in the women's T47 100m and 200m.

Key

- Note–Ranks given for track events are within the athlete's heat only
- Q = Qualified for the next round
- q = Qualified for the next round as a fastest loser
- N/A = Round not applicable for the event
- Bye = Athlete not required to compete in round

Men

Track events

Athlete	Event	Semifinal		Final	
Athlete	Event	Result	Rank	Result	Rank
Anthony Bouchard	100 m T52	—N/a		17.67	1st place, gold medalist(s)
Isaiah Christophe	100 m T54	14.69	2 Q	14.78	4
Anthony Bouchard	400 m T52	—N/a		1:03.15	3rd place, bronze medalist(s)
Isaiah Christophe	400 m T54	50.42	3 Q	49.53	6
Michael Barber	1500 m T20	—N/a		4:11.99	2nd place, silver medalist(s)
Liam Stanley	1500 m T38	—N/a		4:13.60	2nd place, silver medalist(s)

Field events

Athlete	Event	Final	
Athlete	Event	Distance	Position
Noah Vucsics	Long jump T20	6.96	3rd place, bronze medalist(s)
Jesse Zesseu	Long jump T37/T38	5.78	3rd place, bronze medalist(s)
David Bambrick	Shot put F35/F36/F37	10.83	5
Charles William Bridges	Shot put F55	8.19	8
David Bambrick	Discus throw F37	32.52	5
Jesse Zesseu	Discus throw F37	52.32	2nd place, silver medalist(s)
Charles William Bridges	Javelin throw F55	23.42	4
Alister McQueen	Javelin throw F57	37.16	6

Women

Track events

Athlete	Event	Semifinal		Final	
Athlete	Event	Result	Rank	Result	Rank
Sheriauna Haase	100 m T47	12.76	1 Q	12.56	3rd place, bronze medalist(s)
Natalie Thirsk	100 m T38	14.32	2 Q	14.31	4
Sheriauna Haase	200 m T47	26.17	2 Q	25.65	3rd place, bronze medalist(s)
Natalie Thirsk	400 m T38	1:11.28	2 Q	1:08.22	4
Keegan Gaunt	1500 m T13	—N/a		4:53.75	3

Field events

Athlete	Event	Final	
Athlete	Event	Distance	Position
Tianna Rissling	Long jump T36/T37/T38	4.17	3rd place, bronze medalist(s)
Laura Calovini	Shot put F35/F36/F37	8.01	6
Charlotte Bolton	Shot put F40/F41	7.57	5
Laura Calovini	Discus throw F38	18.75	8
Renee Foessel	Discus throw F38	35.01	3rd place, bronze medalist(s)
Charlotte Bolton	Discus throw F41	24.97	3rd place, bronze medalist(s)

== Badminton ==
Men

Athlete	Event	Preliminaries				Quarterfinals	Semifinals	Final / BM	
Athlete	Event	Opposition Result	Opposition Result	Opposition Result	Rank	Opposition Result	Opposition Result	Opposition Result	Rank
Mikhail Bilenki	Singles WH1	Dominguez (COL); L 16–21, 10–21	Palma (MEX); W 21–17, 21–15	—N/a	2 Q	Montero (PER); W 18–21, 21–18, 21–17	Cano (BRA); L 13–21, 9–21	Bronze medal final Dominguez (COL); L 11–21, 19–21	4
Bernard Lapointe	Singles WH2	Godoy (BRA); L 8–21, 13–21	Zambrano (MEX); W 21–17, 21–11	Robledo (ARG); W 21–5, 21–12	2 Q	—N/a	Godoy (BRA); L 11–21, 16–21	Bronze medal final Chaves (BRA); W 21–8, 21–4	3rd place, bronze medalist(s)
William Roussy	Singles SL3	Vázquez (MEX); W 21–2, 21–7	Cardoso (BRA); W 21–16, 21–8	—N/a	1 Q	Bye	Cardoso (BRA); W 21–8, 21–17	Vinatea (PER); L 21–11, 18–21, 15–21	2nd place, silver medalist(s)
Pascal Lapointe	Singles SL4	Torres (ARG); W 21–5, 21–8	Cleto (BRA); W 21–18, 21–13	—N/a	1 Q	—N/a	Oliveira (BRA); L 7–21, 7–21	Bronze medal final Johann (BRA); L 11–21, 19–21	4
Justin Kendrick	Singles SH6	Dalmau (CUB); L 16–21, 19–21	Salva (PER); L 20–22, 15–21	Castillo (MEX); W 21–19, 21–16	3	Did not advance			
Wyatt Lightfoot	Singles SH6	Krajewski (USA); L 6–21, 10–21	Mattos (ARG); W 21–5, 21–14	Coloma (CHI); W 21–5, 21–7	2 Q	Salva (PER); L 17–21, 21–19, 11–21	Did not advance		
Mikhail Bilenki; Bernard Lapointe	Doubles WH1–WH2	Barbosa / Cano (BRA); L 10–21, 17–21	Palma / Zambrano (MEX); W 21–14, 17–21, 21–19	—N/a	2 Q	—N/a	Conceição / Godoy (BRA); L 6–21, 8–21	Bronze medal final Fajardo / Vilcachagua (PER); L 16–21, 11–21	4

Women

Athlete	Event	Preliminaries				Semifinals	Final / BM	
Athlete	Event	Opposition Result	Opposition Result	Opposition Result	Rank	Opposition Result	Opposition Result	Rank
Yuka Chokyu	Singles WH1	Evangelista (BRA); W 21–7, 21–11	Gomes (BRA); W 22–20, 21–4	Burgos (PER); W 21–13, 21–16	1 Q	Burgos (PER); L 21–23, 21–19, 14–21	Bronze medal final Burnett (USA); W 21–5, 21–5	3rd place, bronze medalist(s)
Olivia Meier	Singles SL4	Davis (BAR); W 21–13, 21–8	Oliveira (BRA); L 15–21, 19–21	—N/a	2 Q	Reis (BRA); L 10–21, 14–21	Bronze medal final Ventocilla (PER); W 21–13, 21–18	3rd place, bronze medalist(s)
Colleen Nicole Cloëtta	Singles SH6	Velásquez (PER); L 8–21, 10–21	Póveda (PER); L 2–21, 2–21	Xavier (BRA); W 21–18, 21–13	3	Did not advance		

Mixed

Athlete	Event	Preliminaries					Semifinals	Final / BM	
Athlete	Event	Opposition Result	Opposition Result	Opposition Result	Opposition Result	Rank	Opposition Result	Opposition Result	Rank
Pascal Lapointe; Olivia Meier	Doubles SL3–SU5	Bello / Llanes (CUB); W 25–23, 21–16	Rodrigues / Ávila (BRA); L 14–21, 16–21	—N/a		2	Did not advance		
Justin Kendrick; Colleen Nicole Cloëtta	Doubles SH6	Quispe / Póveda (PER); L 7–21, 3–21	Krajewski / Simon (USA); L 5–21, 7–21	Salva / Fernandez (PER); L 10–21, 11–21	Mattos / Loyola (ARG); W 23–21, 21–19	4	—N/a		4

== Boccia ==
Men

Athlete	Event	Pool matches				Quarterfinals	Semifinals	Final / BM	
Athlete	Event	Opposition Score	Opposition Score	Opposition Score	Rank	Opposition Score	Opposition Score	Opposition Score	Rank
Lance Cryderman	Individual BC1	Castro (PER); W 8–5	Sanchez (MEX); L 0–7	—N/a	2 Q	—N/a	Hayward (BER); W 5–2	Sanchez (MEX); L 0–11	2nd place, silver medalist(s)
Danik Allard	Individual BC2	Delgado (ECU); W 11–1	Cristaldo (ARG); W 7–2	—N/a	1 Q	Bye	Sayes (ESA); W 7–1	Santos (BRA); L 1–6	2nd place, silver medalist(s)
Ryan Rondeau	Individual BC3	Carvalho (BRA); L 0–9	Lopez (MEX); L 2–3	Romero (ARG); L 4–6	4	Did not advance			
Iulian Ciobanu	Individual BC4	Mora (MEX); W 2*–2	Santos (BRA); L 2–4	—N/a	2 Q	Taylor (USA); W 5–2	Grisales (COL); L 2–4	Bronze medal final Dispaltro (CAN); W 5–3	3rd place, bronze medalist(s)
Marco Dispaltro	Individual BC4	Costa (BRA); W 3–2	Bulacio (ARG); W 9–1	Grisales (COL); W 1–7	1 Q	Santos (BRA); W 5–2	Chica (COL); L 0–8	Bronze medal final Ciobanu (CAN); L 3–5	4

Women

Athlete	Event	Pool matches				Quarterfinals	Semifinals	Final / BM	
Athlete	Event	Opposition Score	Opposition Score	Opposition Score	Rank	Opposition Score	Opposition Score	Opposition Score	Rank
Kristyn Collins	Individual BC2	Guzmán (CHI); W 7–1	Martínez (MEX); L 1–4	—N/a	2 Q	—N/a	Duarte (ESA); L 0–5	Bronze medal final León (ECU); L 2–3	4
Joëlle Guérette	Individual BC3	Chastain (USA); W 6–2	Pancca (PER); L 1–8	Oliveira (BRA); L 1–8	3	Did not advance			
Alison Levine	Individual BC4	Urrejola (CHI); W 13–0	Navarrete (COL); W 10–0	—N/a	1 Q	Bye	Manuel (MEX); W 7–2	Chica (COL); W 4–2	1st place, gold medalist(s)

Mixed

Athlete	Event	Pool matches				Semifinals	Final / BM	
Athlete	Event	Opposition Score	Opposition Score	Opposition Score	Rank	Opposition Score	Opposition Score	Rank
Lance Cryderman; Danik Allard; Kristyn Collins	Team BC1–BC2	Ecuador; W 11–1	Brazil; W 11–2	—N/a	1 Q	Chile; W 6–5	Brazil; L 2–8	2nd place, silver medalist(s)
Ryan Rondeau; Joëlle Guérette	Pairs BC3	Colombia; L 2–4	Brazil; L 4–6	Guatemala; W 6–2	3	Did not advance		
Iulian Ciobanu; Alison Levine	Pairs BC4	Argentina; W 9–0	Brazil; L 1–4	—N/a	2 Q	Mexico; W 4–3	Colombia; W 3*–3	1st place, gold medalist(s)

== Cycling ==
=== Road ===
Men

Athlete	Event	Result	Rank
Alexandre Hayward	Time trial C1–5	26:21.14	1st place, gold medalist(s)
Michael Sametz	Time trial C1–5	27:25.14	3rd place, bronze medalist(s)
Charles Moreau	Time trial H1–5	31:46.65	3rd place, bronze medalist(s)
Alexandre Hayward	Road race C1–3	1:18:03	2nd place, silver medalist(s)
Michael Sametz	Road race C1–3	1:22:35	6
Charles Moreau	Road race H3–5	1:43:56	4

Women

Athlete	Event	Result	Rank
Melissa Pemble-Chubb-Higgins	Time trial C1–5	16:55.52	7
Keely Shaw	Time trial C1–5	15:34.08	4
Melissa Pemble-Chubb-Higgins	Road race C1–3	1:17:08	4
Keely Shaw	Road race C4–5	1:47:18	5

Mixed

Athlete	Event	Result	Rank
Nathan Clement	Time trial T1–2	15:44.73	1st place, gold medalist(s)
Shelley Gautier	Time trial T1–2	18:42.12	5
Nathan Clement	Road race T1–2	58:02	3rd place, bronze medalist(s)
Shelley Gautier	Road race T1–2	1:18:58	6

=== Track ===
Men

Athlete	Event	Qualification		Final	
Athlete	Event	Time	Rank	Opposition Time	Rank
Alexandre Hayward	Pursuit C1–3	3:27.860	1 FG	Perea (COL); W 3:26.642	1st place, gold medalist(s)
Michael Sametz	Pursuit C1–3	3:33.121	3 FB	Bronze medal final Muñoz (COL); W OVL	3rd place, bronze medalist(s)
Alexandre Hayward	Time trial C1–5	—N/a		1:06.566	3rd place, bronze medalist(s)
Michael Sametz	Time trial C1–5	—N/a		1:08.707	5

Women

Athlete	Event	Qualification		Final	
Athlete	Event	Time	Rank	Opposition Time	Rank
Melissa Pemble-Chubb-Higgins	Pursuit C1–3	4:13.725	2 FG	Whitmore (USA); W 4:10.103	1st place, gold medalist(s)
Keely Shaw	Pursuit C4–5	3:46.931	1 FG	Bosco (USA); L 3:47.005	2nd place, silver medalist(s)
Melissa Pemble-Chubb-Higgins	Time trial C1–5	—N/a		37.565	2nd place, silver medalist(s)
Keely Shaw	Time trial C1–5	—N/a		40.179	7

== Football 7-a-side ==
Summary

Team	Event	Group stage						Final / BM	
Team	Event	Opposition Score	Opposition Score	Opposition Score	Opposition Score	Opposition Score	Rank	Opposition Score	Rank
Canada men's	Men's tournament	Venezuela; L 1–2	Brazil; L 1–11	Chile; L 1–2	Argentina; L 0–10	United States; L 0–6	6	Fifth place match Chile; L 1–2	6

Roster

The team roster of 14 athletes was named.

- Samuel Denton
- Christopher Fawcett
- Ryan Watson
- Nicholas Heffernan
- Samuel Charron
- Dante Del Cul
- Dustin Hodgson
- Duncan McDonald
- Daniel White
- Diego Gilbert
- Raji Kamoun
- Silviu Butnaru
- Cuauhtemoc Flores
- Isaiah Smeaton-Katzenberg

Preliminary round

18 November
19:30

Venezuela	2 – 1	Canada
Rea Soriano 66', 68'		Charron 36'

Estadio Bicentenario de La Florida, Santiago

19 November
19:30

Brazil	11 – 1	Canada
de Oliveira 9', 24', 31'; Cardoso de Souza 10', 20', 39' da Silva 25', 50', 57'; Magalhães 28'; Pereira 32'		Del Cul 18'

Estadio Bicentenario de La Florida, Santiago

20 November
17:00

Canada	1 – 2	Chile
Butnaru 3'		Velasquez 39'; Del Pino 52'

Estadio Bicentenario de La Florida, Santiago

22 November
19:30

Canada	0 – 10	Argentina
		Suarez 9'; Coronel 11'; Lugrin 27', 38'; Carrizo 29'; Billordo 48', 54'; Bassi 55', 59'; Ocantos 58'

Estadio Bicentenario de La Florida, Santiago

23 November
17:00

United States	6 – 0	Canada
Brunais 1', 30+4'; DeLillo 7', 15'; Lowery Jr. 40'; McCandlish 60'

Estadio Bicentenario de La Florida, Santiago

Fifth place match

25 November
14:30

Chile	2 – 1 (a.e.t)	Canada
Velasquez 32'; Bórquez Poblete 66'

Estadio Bicentenario de La Florida, Santiago

== Goalball ==
Summary

Team	Event	Group stage				Quarterfinal	Semifinal	Final / BM	
Team	Event	Opposition Score	Opposition Score	Opposition Score	Rank	Opposition Score	Opposition Score	Opposition Score	Rank
Canada men's	Men's tournament	United States; L 2–9	Venezuela; W 11–1	Argentina; L 4–5	3 Q	Chile; W 9–1	United States; L 4–11	Bronze medal match Argentina; W 6–2	3rd place, bronze medalist(s)
Canada women's	Women's tournament	United States; L 3–5	Peru; W 11–1	Chile; W 10–1	2 Q	Mexico; W 10–0	Brazil; W 4–2	United States; W 4–3	1st place, gold medalist(s)

Men's roster

The team roster of 6 athletes was named.

- Ahmad Zeividavi
- Steven Brice Parker
- Aaron Prevost
- Lorne Blair Nesbitt
- Allen Douglas Ripley
- Jeffrey Scott

Women's roster

The team roster of 6 athletes was named.

- Whitney Bogart
- Meghan Mahon
- Emma-leigh Heather
- Tracy Baldock
- Amy Burk
- Maryam Salehizadeh

== Judo ==
Men

Athlete	Event	Round of 16	Quarterfinals	Semifinals	Repechage 1	Repechage 2	Final / BM	
Athlete	Event	Opposition Result	Opposition Result	Opposition Result	Opposition Result	Opposition Result	Opposition Result	Rank
Justin Karn	−60 kg	Did not start						

Women

Athlete	Event	Round of 16	Quarterfinals	Semifinals	Repechage	Final / BM	
Athlete	Event	Opposition Result	Opposition Result	Opposition Result	Opposition Result	Opposition Result	Rank
Christina Mowatt	−57 kg	Bye	González (ARG); L 00–10	Did not advance	Oliveira (BRA); L 00–10	Did not advance	

== Shooting ==
Mixed

Athlete	Event	Qualification		Final	
Athlete	Event	Score	Rank	Score	Rank
Doug Blessin	R4 – 10 m air rifle standing SH2	621.0	4 Q	205.5	4
Line Tremblay	R4 – 10 m air rifle standing SH2	614.1	8 Q	113.8	8
Doug Blessin	R5 – 10 m air rifle prone SH2	631.5	5 Q	188.6	5
Line Tremblay	R5 – 10 m air rifle prone SH2	615.8	9	Did not advance	

== Swimming ==
Men

Athlete	Event	Heat		Final	
Athlete	Event	Time	Rank	Time	Rank
Félix Cowan	50 m freestyle S9	27.88	4 Q	28.00	5
Jagdev Gill	50 m freestyle S10	—N/a		25.72	4
Fernando Lu	50 m freestyle S10	—N/a		25.28	2nd place, silver medalist(s)
Caleb Arndt	50 m freestyle S13	—N/a		27.66	5
Jagdev Gill	100 m freestyle S10	—N/a		56.90	3rd place, bronze medalist(s)
Fernando Lu	100 m freestyle S10	—N/a		57.18	4
Hunter Helberg	100 m freestyle S12	1:04.16	7 Q	1:03.49	7
Connor Bissett	200 m freestyle S14	2:10.23	6 Q	2:09.26	6
Jesse Canney	200 m freestyle S14	2:13.83	7 Q	2:11.58	7
Tyson MacDonald	200 m freestyle S14	2:03.13	3 Q	2:01.61	3rd place, bronze medalist(s)
Félix Cowan	400 m freestyle S9	5:04.87	7 Q	5:01.08	8
Caleb Arndt	400 m freestyle S13	—N/a		4:58.55	5
Hunter Helberg	400 m freestyle S13	—N/a		5:13.66	6
Félix Cowan	100 m backstroke S9	1:14.95	7 Q	1:15.37	8
Fernando Lu	100 m backstroke S10	—N/a		1:11.07	6
Hunter Helberg	100 m backstroke S12	—N/a		1:17.54	5
Connor Bissett	100 m backstroke S14	1:14.05	10	Did not advance	
Jesse Canney	100 m backstroke S14	1:09.48	7 Q	1:07.38	6
Tyson MacDonald	100 m backstroke S14	1:04.01	3 Q	1:03.57	3rd place, bronze medalist(s)
Jagdev Gill	100 m breaststroke SB9	1:15.83	6 Q	DSQ	
Fernando Lu	100 m breaststroke SB9	1:15.25	4 Q	1:13.61	4
Hunter Helberg	100 m breaststroke SB12	—N/a		1:31.10	6
Jesse Canney	100 m breaststroke SB14	—N/a		1:23.27	6
Jagdev Gill	100 m butterfly S10	—N/a		1:01.83	4
Fernando Lu	100 m butterfly S10	—N/a		1:01.31	3rd place, bronze medalist(s)
Hunter Helberg	100 m butterfly S12	—N/a		1:08.71	6
Connor Bissett	100 m butterfly S14	—N/a		1:04.82	6
Jesse Canney	100 m butterfly S14	—N/a		1:05.75	7
Félix Cowan	200 m individual medley SM9	2:41.92	8 Q	2:42.57	8
Jagdev Gill	200 m individual medley SM10	—N/a		2:34.33	5
Fernando Lu	200 m individual medley SM10	—N/a		2:27.21	4
Caleb Arndt	200 m individual medley SM13	—N/a		2:37.83	4
Hunter Helberg	200 m individual medley SM13	—N/a		2:44.02	5
Connor Bissett	200 m individual medley SM14	2:31.43	8 Q	2:29.53	6
Jesse Canney	200 m individual medley SM14	2:27.57	6 Q	DSQ	
Tyson MacDonald	200 m individual medley SM14	2:17.89	1 Q	2:16.36	2nd place, silver medalist(s)

Women

Athlete	Event	Heat		Final	
Athlete	Event	Time	Rank	Time	Rank
Jordan Tucker	50 m freestyle S4	53.59	4 Q	53.95	4
Ruby Stevens	50 m freestyle S6	Did not start		—N/a	
Myriam Soliman	50 m freestyle S8	39.87	12	Did not advance	
Alisson Gobeil	100 m freestyle S5	1:32.66	4 Q	1:32.59	4
Jordan Tucker	100 m freestyle S5	2:03.48	11	Did not advance	
Myriam Soliman	100 m freestyle S7	1:30.44	8 Q	1:30.56	8
Ruby Stevens	100 m freestyle S7	1:34.90	9	Did not advance	
Alisson Gobeil	200 m freestyle S5	3:28.16	6 Q	3:26.16	6
Emma Van Dyk	200 m freestyle S14	2:26.94	6 Q	2:29.24	7
Jordan Tucker	50 m backstroke S4	1:08.99	6 Q	1:08.00	6
Alisson Gobeil	50 m backstroke S5	55.91	7 Q	56.68	8
Ruby Stevens	100 m backstroke S6	—N/a		1:30.41	1st place, gold medalist(s)
Myriam Soliman	100 m backstroke S7	—N/a		1:44.60	6
Justine Morrier	100 m backstroke S14	1:19.43	5 Q	1:17.84	5
Emma Van Dyk	100 m backstroke S14	1:15.08	3 Q	1:13.34	3rd place, bronze medalist(s)
Ruby Stevens	100 m breaststroke SB5	—N/a		2:07.19	4
Myriam Soliman	100 m breaststroke SB7	—N/a		2:20.05	6
Justine Morrier	100 m breaststroke SB14	—N/a		1:25.27	4
Jordan Tucker	50 m butterfly S5	—N/a		54.70	3rd place, bronze medalist(s)
Myriam Soliman	50 m butterfly S7	—N/a		44.63	4
Justine Morrier	100 m butterfly S14	1:15.14	5	1:13.44	3rd place, bronze medalist(s)
Emma Van Dyk	100 m butterfly S14	1:15.60	6	1:16.95	6
Jordan Tucker	150 m individual medley SM4	—N/a		3:52.31	5
Alisson Gobeil	200 m individual medley SM5	—N/a		4:35.38	5
Ruby Stevens	200 m individual medley SM6	—N/a		3:57.74	5
Myriam Soliman	200 m individual medley SM7	—N/a		3:50.47	6
Justine Morrier	200 m individual medley SM14	2:50.15	8 Q	2:46.38	5
Emma Van Dyk	200 m individual medley SM14	2:46.27	5 Q	2:47.41	6

Mixed

Athlete	Event	Final	
Athlete	Event	Time	Rank
Jagdev Gill; Fernando Lu; Alisson Gobeil; Myriam Soliman	4 × 100 m freestyle relay 34pts	4:56.88	5
Jagdev Gill; Fernando Lu; Alisson Gobeil; Myriam Soliman	4 × 100 m medley relay 34pts	5:38.28	6

== Table tennis ==
Men

Athlete	Event	Preliminaries					Round of 16	Quarterfinals	Semifinals	Final / BM	
Athlete	Event	Opposition Result	Opposition Result	Opposition Result	Opposition Result	Rank	Opposition Result	Opposition Result	Opposition Result	Opposition Result	Rank
Peter Isherwood	Singles C2	Reyes (MEX); L 1–3	Flores (CHI); L 0–3	Espíndola (BRA); L 0–3	Marcião (BRA); L 0–3	5	—N/a				5
Muhammad Mudassar	Singles C4	Babes (BRA); L 2–3	Sanchez (MEX); L 0–3	—N/a		3	Did not advance				
Ian Kent	Singles C8	Mashki (BRA); L 1–3	Pérez (ARG); L 1–3	Makkar (USA); L 2–3	—N/a	4	Did not advance				
Asad Syed	Singles C9	Rivera (PUR); L 2–3	Watson (USA); L 1–3	Sarmiento (ECU); W 3–0	—N/a	3	Did not advance				
Peter Isherwood; Muhammad Mudassar	Doubles C8	—N/a					Gonzalez / Reyes (MEX); L 2–3	Did not advance			
Ian Kent; Asad Syed	Doubles C18	—N/a					Dettoni / Pavez (CHI); L 1–3	Did not advance			

Women

Athlete	Event	Preliminaries			Semifinals	Final / BM	
Athlete	Event	Opposition Result	Opposition Result	Rank	Opposition Result	Opposition Result	Rank
Stephanie Chan	Singles C6–7	Perez (MEX); L 0–3	Morales (CRC); W 3–2	2 Q	Muñoz (ARG); L 0–3	Did not advance	3rd place, bronze medalist(s)

Mixed

Athlete	Event	Round of 16	Quarterfinals	Semifinals	Final / BM	
Athlete	Event	Opposition Result	Opposition Result	Opposition Result	Opposition Result	Rank
Asad Syed; Stephanie Chan	Doubles C14–17	Castro / Perez (MEX); W 3–2	Torres / Pérez (CHI); L 0–3	Did not advance		

== Wheelchair basketball ==
Summary

Team	Event	Group stage				Quarterfinal	Semifinal	Final / BM	
Team	Event	Opposition Score	Opposition Score	Opposition Score	Rank	Opposition Score	Opposition Score	Opposition Score	Rank
Canada men's	Men's tournament	Chile; W 80–17	Venezuela; W 82–42	Argentina; W 56–49	1 Q	Puerto Rico; W 88–31	Colombia; L 53–64	Bronze medal match Argentina; W 70–62	3rd place, bronze medalist(s)
Canada women's	Women's tournament	Brazil; W 61–44	El Salvador; W 69–17	Colombia; W 71–25	1 Q	—N/a	Argentina; W 76–36	United States; L 56–62	2nd place, silver medalist(s)

Men's roster

The team roster of 12 athletes was named.

- Nikola Goncin
- Garret Ostepchuk
- Robert Hedges
- Vincent Dallaire
- Blaise Mutware
- Colin Higgins
- Lee Melymic
- Chad Jassmann
- Patrick Anderson
- Jonathan Vermette
- Tyler Miller
- Reed De'Aeth

Women's roster

The team roster of 12 athletes was named.

- Rosalie Lalonde
- Élodie Tessier
- Arinn Young
- Cindy Ouellet
- Tamara Steeves
- Puisand Lai
- Tara Llanes
- Bethany Johnson
- Kady Dandeneau
- Sofia Fassi Fehri
- Melanie Hawtin
- Desiree Isaac Pictou

== Wheelchair rugby ==
Summary

Team	Event	Group stage						Semifinal	Final / BM	
Team	Event	Opposition Score	Opposition Score	Opposition Score	Opposition Score	Opposition Score	Rank	Opposition Score	Opposition Score	Rank
Canada national team	Mixed tournament	Argentina; W 63–30	Brazil; W 62–41	Chile; W 60–27	Colombia; W 61–45	United States; W 46–41	1 Q	Brazil; W 60–45	United States; L 51–57	2nd place, silver medalist(s)

Roster

The team roster of 12 athletes was named.

- Rio Kanda Kovac
- Travis Murao
- Byron Green
- Mike Whitehead
- Cody Caldwell
- Trevor Hirschfield
- Patrice Dagenais
- Patrice Simard
- Anthony Létourneau
- Matthew Debly
- Zak Madell
- Eric Furtado Rodrigues

== Wheelchair tennis ==
Men

Athlete	Event	Round of 32	Round of 16	Quarterfinals	Semifinals	Final / BM	
Athlete	Event	Opposition Result	Opposition Result	Opposition Result	Opposition Result	Opposition Result	Rank
Barry Henderson	Singles	Apaza (PER); L 4–6, 4–6	Did not advance				
Thomas Venos	Singles	Chomba (PER); W 6–1, 6–1	Stroud (USA); L 3–6, 1–6	Did not advance			
Barry Henderson; Thomas Venos	Doubles	—N/a	Beltrán / Manzano (ECU); W 6–0, 6–3	Ratzlaff / Stroud (USA); L 1–6, 5–7	Did not advance		

Women

Athlete	Event	Round of 16	Quarterfinals	Semifinals	Final / BM	
Athlete	Event	Opposition Result	Opposition Result	Opposition Result	Opposition Result	Rank
Anne-Marie Dolinar	Singles	Martínez (COL); L 0–6, 3–6	Did not advance			
Natalia Lanucha	Singles	Valverde (CRC); W 6–4, 7–5	Bernal (COL); L 0–6, 2–6	Did not advance		
Anne-Marie Dolinar; Natalia Lanucha	Doubles	—N/a	Mathewson / Phelps (USA); L 0–6, 2–6	Did not advance		

Quad

Athlete	Event	Round of 16	Quarterfinals	Semifinals	Final / BM	
Athlete	Event	Opposition Result	Opposition Result	Opposition Result	Opposition Result	Rank
Mitch McIntyre	Singles	Molina (ECU); W 6–2, 6–3	Cayulef (CHI); L 3–6, 2–6	Did not advance		
Robert Shaw	Singles	Bye	Pérez (CHI); W 6–3, 7–5	Silva (BRA); W 6–4, 5–7, 6–3	Cayulef (CHI); L 3–6, 7–5, 4–6	2nd place, silver medalist(s)
Mitch McIntyre; Robert Shaw	Doubles	—N/a	Bogdanov / Wagner (USA); L 3–6, 6–3, 2–10	Did not advance		

== See also ==
- Canada at the 2023 Pan American Games
- Canada at the 2024 Summer Paralympics
