= Venues of the 2023 Pan American and Parapan American Games =

Sports venues in Santiago, Chile

The following is the list of venues for the 2023 Pan American Games and 2023 Parapan American Games held in Santiago, Chile and surrounding cities from October 20 to November 5, 2023 and from November 17 to 25, 2023 respectively.

A total of 41 competition venues will be used to stage the sporting events. Various venues across Santiago and various other cities will be used for the games, including Viña del Mar, Valparaíso and Algarrobo. In March 2022, the first venue for the games was officially inaugurated: the field hockey stadium on the National Stadium Grounds.

In June 2022, organizers revealed the final venue plan consisting of 41 competition venues in four regions of the country: Santiago, Valparaíso, O'Higgins and Biobío.

== Venues ==
=== Santiago Metropolitan Region ===
==== National Stadium Park ====
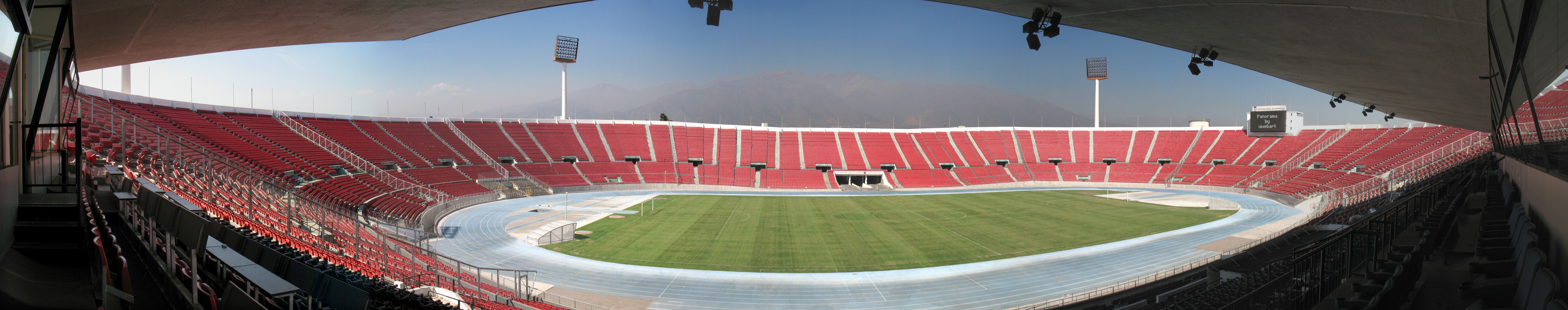
at the Pan-American Games, the National Stadium hosted the opening ceremonies and the athletics.The venue also hosted the Para Pan-American Games opening ceremonies

12 venues are located in the National Stadium Park cluster.

Venue	Sports		Capacity	Ref.
Venue	Pan American Games	Parapan American Games	Capacity	Ref.
Aquatic Center	Artistic swimming Diving; Swimming; Water polo	Swimming	2,400	
Contact Sports Training Center	Judo; Karate; Taekwondo	Judo; Taekwondo	1,676	
Field Hockey Training Center	Field hockey	—N/a	TBD	
Mario Recordón Training Center	—N/a	Athletics	5,000	
South American Games Training Center	Basketball (5x5)	Wheelchair basketball	5,000	
Chile National Stadium	Athletics; Ceremonies (Opening)	Ceremonies (Opening)	48,745	
Chilean Paralympic Training Center	Fencing	Blind football Goalball	TBD	
Skating rink	Roller sports (Inline speed skating)	—N/a	TBD	
Tennis and Racket Sports Training Center	Racquetball; Squash; Tennis	Wheelchair tennis	5,020	
Training Center for Collective Sport	Gymnastics (Artistic/Rhythmic/Trampoline)	Wheelchair rugby	3,086	
Urban Sports Esplanade	Cycling (BMX freestyle); Roller sports (Skateboarding)	—N/a	1,500	

==== Cerrillos Bicentennial Park ====
Three venues are located in the Cerrillos Bicentennial Park cluster.

Venue	Sports		Capacity	Ref.
Venue	Pan American Games	Parapan American Games	Capacity	Ref.
Cerrillos Bicentennial Park	Sport climbing	—N/a	TBD	
Baseball and Softball Centre	Baseball; Softball	—N/a	TBD	
Museo Nacional Aeronáutico y del Espacio	—N/a	Ceremonies (Closing)	TBD	

==== Peñalolen Park ====
Three venues are located in the Peñalolen Park cluster.

Venue	Sports		Capacity	Ref.
Venue	Pan American Games	Parapan American Games	Capacity	Ref.
Archery Fields	Archery	Archery	TBD	
Beach volleyball center	Beach volleyball	—N/a	TBD	
BMX track	Cycling (BMX racing)	—N/a	TBD	
Velódromo Peñalolén	Cycling (track); Roller sports (artistic)	Cycling (track)	3,000	

==== Standalone venues ====
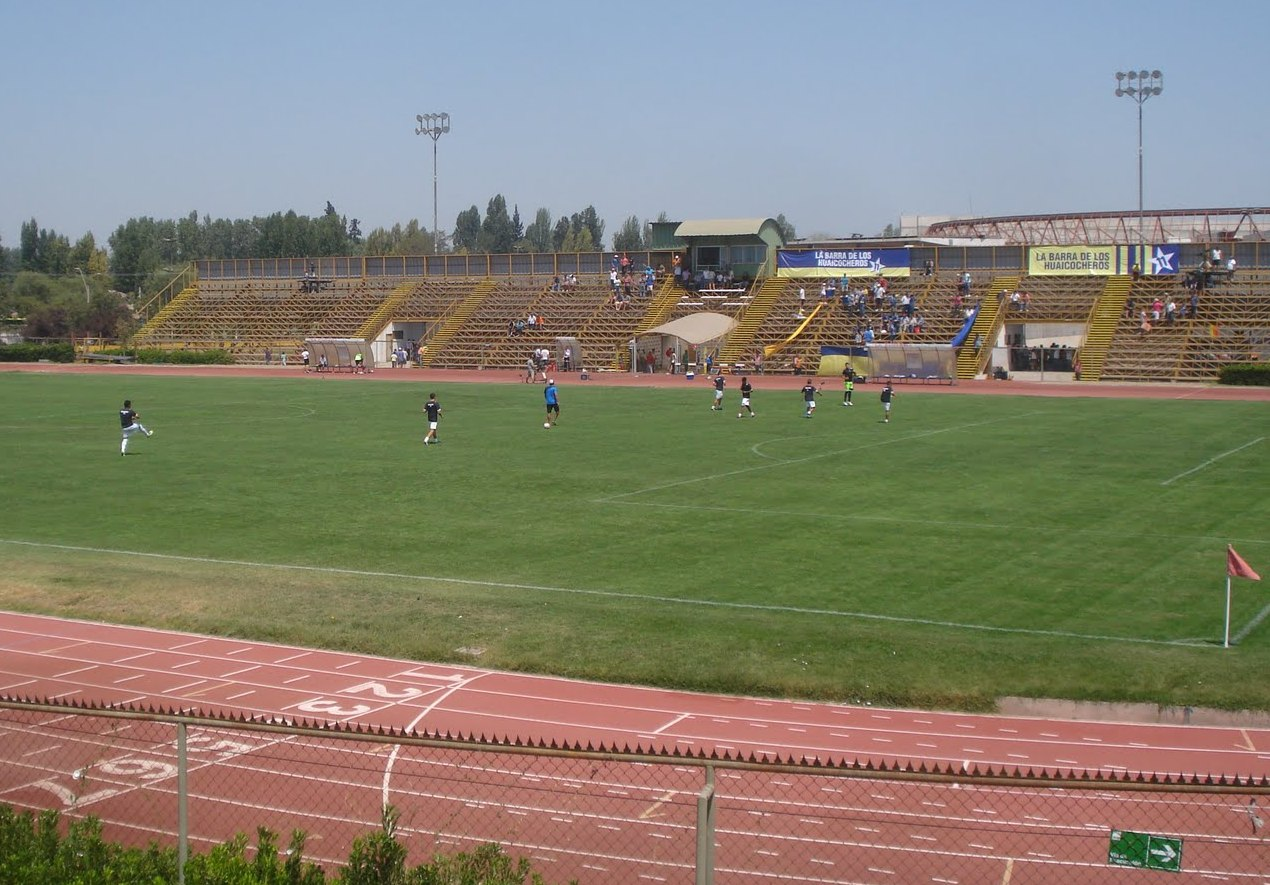
Municipal Stadium will host the rugby sevens competitions.

A further 14 standalone venues were located in the Santiago Metropolitan region.

Venue	Sports		Capacity	Ref.
Venue	Pan American Games	Parapan American Games	Capacity	Ref.
Arena Parque O'Higgins	Volleyball (indoor)	—N/a	12,000	
Bernardo O'Higgins Military School (Las Condes)	Modern pentathlon	—N/a	TBD	
Bowling Center (La Florida)	Bowling	—N/a	TBD	
Estadio Bicentenario de La Florida	Ceremonies (Closing)	CP football	25.000	
Chimkowe Gym (Peñalolén)	Breaking; Weightlifting	Powerlifting	TBD	
"Lo Espejo Physical Center" (Lo Espejo)	—N/a	Boccia	TBD	
Lo Aguirre Shooting Range (Pudahuel)	Shooting	Shooting	TBD	
Laguna Los Morros (San Bernardo)	Swimming (Open water); Water skiing	—N/a		
Municipal Stadium (La Pintana)	Rugby sevens	—N/a	5,000	
Olympic Training Center (Ñuñoa)	Badminton; Boxing; Table tennis Wrestling	Badminton; Table tennis	1,200	
Prince of Wales Country Club (La Reina)	Golf	—N/a	TBD	
Santiago Metropolitan Park (Providencia)	Cycling (Mountain biking)	—N/a	TBD	
"Estadio Español" Center (Las Condes)	Basketball (3x3); Basque pelota	—N/a	TBD	
Streets of Santiago	Athletics (Marathon/Race walk); Cycling (Road)	Cycling (Road)	TBD	

=== Valparaíso Region ===
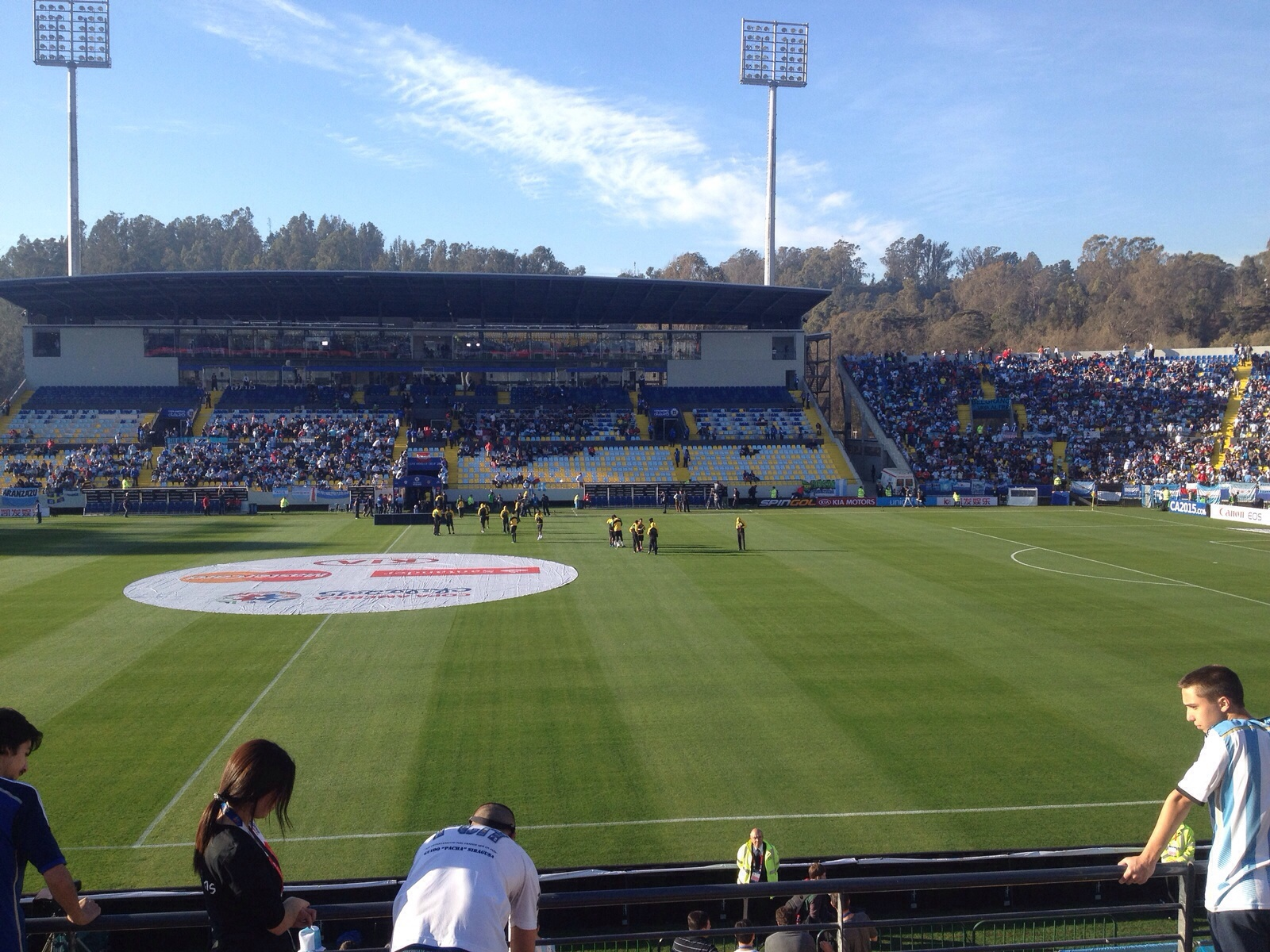
Sausalito Stadium in Viña del Mar will stage the men's football competitions.

Seven venues were located in the Valparaíso Region.

Venue	Sports		Capacity	Ref.
Venue	Pan American Games	Parapan American Games	Capacity	Ref.
Aconcagua River (Los Andes)	Canoeing (Slalom)	—N/a	TBD	
Elías Figueroa Stadium (Valparaíso)	Football (Women's tournament)	—N/a	20,575	
Hermandad Náutica del Pacífico (Algarrobo)	Sailing	—N/a		
San Isidro Riding School (Quillota)	Equestrian (Dressage/Evening/Jumping)	—N/a	TBD	
El Sol Beach (Viña del Mar)	Triathlon	—N/a		
Sausalito Stadium (Viña del Mar)	Football (Men's tournament)	—N/a	23,423	
Viña del Mar City Gym	Handball	—N/a	3,371	

=== O'Higgins Region ===
One venue was located in the O'Higgins Region.

Venue	Sports		Capacity	Ref.
Venue	Pan American Games	Parapan American Games	Capacity	Ref.
Punta de Lobos (Pichilemu)	Surfing	—N/a	TBD	

=== Biobío Region ===
One venue was located in the Biobío Region.

Venue	Sports		Capacity	Ref.
Venue	Pan American Games	Parapan American Games	Capacity	Ref.
Laguna Grande (San Pedro de la Paz)	Canoeing (Sprint); Rowing	—N/a	TBD	
