= Cycling at the 2023 Parapan American Games – Men's road time trial C1–5 =

Men's road time trial C1–5 at the 2023 Parapan American Games
- Venue: Streets of Isla de Maipo
- Dates: November 19
- Competitors: 26 from 14 nations
- Winning time: 26:21.14

Medalists
1st place, gold medalist(s)		Alexandre Hayward	Canada
2nd place, silver medalist(s)		Lauro Chaman	Brazil
3rd place, bronze medalist(s)		Michael Sametz	Canada

The men's individual road time trial C1–5 competition of the cycling events at the 2023 Parapan American Games was held on November 19 on the Streets of Isla de Maipo, Chile.

== Schedule ==
Date	Time	Round
November 19, 2023	09:20	Final

== Results ==
The results were as follows:

Rank	Class	Rider	Nation	Time
1st place, gold medalist(s)	C3	Alexandre Hayward	Canada	26:21.14
2nd place, silver medalist(s)	C5	Lauro Chaman	Brazil	27:06.06
3rd place, bronze medalist(s)	C3	Michael Sametz	Canada	27:25.14
4	C3	Alejandro Perea	Colombia	27:41.82
5	C2	Job Hilario	Peru	28:30.02
6	C5	Carlos Andrés Villanueva	Colombia	28:46.54
7	C3	Esneider Muñoz Marin	Colombia	28:47.21
8	C5	Edwin Fabián Mátiz Ruiz	Colombia	29:14.27
9	C3	Joseph Berenyi	United States	29:19.37
10	C3	Henry Raabe	Costa Rica	29:24.53
11	C1	Carlos Alberto Gomes	Brazil	29:27.21
12	C2	Victor Luise de Oliveira	Brazil	29:31.88
13	C4	José Angel Morales	Mexico	29:44.56
14	C4	André Grizante	Brazil	30:35.57
15	C2	Yuber Pichihua	Peru	30:38.44
16	C2	Cirio Molina	Venezuela	30:44.68
17	C5	Hernán Moya	Chile	31:17.90
18	C4	José Frank Rodríguez	Dominican Republic	31:24.75
19	C5	Rodny Minier	Dominican Republic	31:26.31
20	C1	Rodrigo Fernando López	Argentina	31:49.40
21	C4	Leonel Solis	Costa Rica	32:07.03
22	C2	Jorge Luis González	Cuba	32:08.53
23	C5	Marcel Milano	Venezuela	32:44.68
24	C5	Maximo Poveda	Panama	34:07.33
25	C4	Pablo Rosso	Uruguay	34:28.92
26	C3	Enzo Monichi	Chile	37:25.90
