= Cycling at the 2023 Parapan American Games – Men's road race C1–3 =

Men's road race C1–3 at the 2023 Parapan American Games
- Venue: Streets of Isla de Maipo
- Dates: November 26
- Competitors: 13 from 9 nations
- Winning time: 1:18:01

Medalists
1st place, gold medalist(s)		Alejandro Perea	Colombia
2nd place, silver medalist(s)		Alexandre Hayward	Canada
3rd place, bronze medalist(s)		Esneider Muñoz Marin	Colombia

The men's individual road race C1–3 competition of the cycling events at the 2023 Parapan American Games was held on November 19 on the Streets of Isla de Maipo, Chile.

== Schedule ==
Date	Time	Round
November 26, 2023	08:00	Final

== Results ==
The results were as follows:

Rank	Rider	Nation	Class	Time
1st place, gold medalist(s)	Alejandro Perea	Colombia	C3	1:18:01
2nd place, silver medalist(s)	Alexandre Hayward	Canada	C3	1:18:03
3rd place, bronze medalist(s)	Esneider Muñoz Marin	Colombia	C3	1:19:10
4	Henry Raabe	Costa Rica	C3	1:21:31
5	Job Hilario	Peru	C2	1:22:32
6	Nichael Sametz	Canada	C3	1:22:32
7	Carlos Alberto Gomes	Brazil	C1	1:26:11
8	Victor Luise de Oliveira	Brazil	C2	1:26:11
9	Yuber Pichihua	Peru	C2	1:26:16
10	Enzo Monichi	Chile	C3	1:29:51
11	Cirio Molina	Venezuela	C2	1:29:51
12	Jorge Luis González	Cuba	C2	1:29:54
13	Rodrigo Fernando Lopez	Argentina	C1	-1 LAP
