= Cycling at the 2023 Parapan American Games – Women's road race C1–3 =

Women's road race C1–3 at the 2023 Parapan American Games
- Venue: Streets of Isla de Maipo
- Dates: November 26
- Competitors: 9 from 6 nations
- Winning time: 1:11:37

Medalists
1st place, gold medalist(s)		Daniela Munévar	Colombia
2nd place, silver medalist(s)		Jamie Whitmore	United States
3rd place, bronze medalist(s)		Paula Caballeros	Colombia

The women's individual road race C1–3 competition of the cycling events at the 2023 Parapan American Games was held on November 19 on the Streets of Isla de Maipo, Chile.

== Schedule ==
Date	Time	Round
November 26, 2023	08:00	Final

== Results ==
The results were as follows:

Rank	Rider	Nation	Class	Time
1st place, gold medalist(s)	Daniela Munévar	Colombia	C2	1:11:37
2nd place, silver medalist(s)	Jamie Whitmore	United States	C3	1:11.37
3rd place, bronze medalist(s)	Paula Caballeros	Colombia	C3	1:11.37
4	Melissa Pemble-Chubb-Higgins	Canada	C3	1:17.08
5	Gilda Hernandez	Mexico	C2	1:17.31
6	Sabrina Custódia	Brazil	C2	1:18.55
7	Amanda Antunes de Paiva	Brazil	C3	1:19.07
8	María Magdalena Sergo	Argentina	C3	1:23.28
9	Victoria de Camargo e Barbosa	Brazil	C2	1:24.42
