= Boccia at the 2023 Parapan American Games – Men's individual BC1 =

Men's individual BC1 at the 2023 Parapan American Games
- Venue: Choose Healthy Living Center
- Dates: November 19 - November 22
- Competitors: 7 from 7 nations

Medalists
1st place, gold medalist(s)		Eduardo Sanchez	Mexico
2nd place, silver medalist(s)		Lance Cryderman	Canada
3rd place, bronze medalist(s)		José Carlos Chagas	Brazil

The men's individual BC1 competition of the boccia events at the 2023 Parapan American Games was held on November 19 - 22 at the Choose Healthy Living Center (Centro Elige Vivir Sano) in of Lo Espejo, Chile.

== Schedule ==
Date	Time	Round
November 19, 2023	10:40	Pool A
November 19, 2023	10:40	Pool B
November 21, 2023	14:00	Semifinals
November 22, 2023	10:40	Final

== Results ==
=== Final stage ===
The results during the final stage were as follows:

Semi-finals
Omar Hayward (BER)	2
Lance Cryderman (CAN)	5
Eduardo Sanchez (MEX)	4
José Carlos Chagas (BRA)	3

Finals
Lance Cryderman (CAN)	0
Eduardo Sanchez (MEX)	11
Third place match
Omar Hayward (BER)	3
José Carlos Chagas (BRA)	4

=== Pool stage ===
The results were as follows:

==== Pool A ====
Athlete	Pld	W	L	PW	PA	Diff	Qualification
Omar Hayward (BER)	3	3	0	18	11	7	Advance to semi-finals
José Carlos Chagas (BRA)	3	2	1	23	7	16	Advance to semi-finals
José Pagua (VEN)	3	1	2	6	16	-10	
Germán Calderón (CHI)	3	0	3	5	18	-13	

Date	Time	Player 1	Score	Player 2
November 19	10:40	José Carlos Chagas (Brazil)	9–0	(Venezuela) José Pagua
November 19	10:40	Omar Hayward (Bermuda)	7–2	(Chile) Germán Calderón
November 19	14:30	José Carlos Chagas (Brazil)	8–1	(Chile) Germán Calderón
November 19	14:30	Omar Hayward (Bermuda)	5–3	(Venezuela) José Pagua
November 20	09:30	José Carlos Chagas (Brazil)	6–6*	(Bermuda) Omar Hayward
November 20	09:30	Germán Calderón (Chile)	2–3	(Venezuela) José Pagua

==== Pool B ====
Athlete	Pld	W	L	PW	PA	Diff	Qualification
Eduardo Sánchez (MEX)	2	2	0	15	0	15	Advance to semi-finals
Lance Cryderman (CAN)	2	1	1	8	12	-4	Advance to semi-finals
Neil Castro (PER)	2	0	2	5	16	-11	

Date	Time	Player 1	Score	Player 2
November 19	10:40	Eduardo Sánchez (Mexico)	8–0	(Peru) Neil Castro
November 19	14:30	Lance Cryderman (Canada)	8–5	(Peru) Neil Castro
November 20	09:30	Eduardo Sánchez (Mexico)	7–0	(Canada) Lance Cryderman
