= Cycling at the 2023 Parapan American Games – Mixed road time trial T1–2 =

Mixed road time trial T1–2 at the 2023 Parapan American Games
- Venue: Streets of Isla de Maipo
- Dates: November 19
- Competitors: 8 from 6 nations
- Winning time: 15:44.73

Medalists
1st place, gold medalist(s)		Nathan Clement	Canada
2nd place, silver medalist(s)		Dennis Connors	United States
3rd place, bronze medalist(s)		Juan José Betancourt	Colombia

The mixed road time trial T1–2 competition of the cycling events at the 2023 Parapan American Games was held on November 19 on the Streets of Isla de Maipo, Chile.

== Schedule ==
Date	Time	Round
November 19, 2023	13:45	Final

== Results ==
The results were as follows:

Rank	Class	Rider	Nation	Time
1st place, gold medalist(s)	T1	Nathan Clement	Canada	15:44.73
2nd place, silver medalist(s)	T2	Dennis Connors	United States	17:14.27
3rd place, bronze medalist(s)	T2	Juan José Betancourt	Colombia	17:46.71
4	T1	Dulce María González	Mexico	17:57.07
5	T1	Shelley Gautier	Canada	18:42.12
6	T2	Estefani Ramos	Mexico	22:32.23
7	T2	Adriano Matunaga	Brazil	24:09.07
8	T2	Giovanna Loiudice	Argentina	30:44.21
