= Boccia at the 2023 Parapan American Games – Women's individual BC2 =

Women's individual BC2 at the 2023 Parapan American Games
- Venue: Choose Healthy Living Center
- Dates: November 19 - November 22
- Competitors: 6 from 6 nations

Medalists
1st place, gold medalist(s)		Karina Martinez	Mexico
2nd place, silver medalist(s)		Rebeca Duarte	El Salvador
3rd place, bronze medalist(s)		Joselyn Leon	Ecuador

The women's individual BC2 competition of the boccia events at the 2023 Parapan American Games was held on November 19 - 22 at the Choose Healthy Living Center (Centro Elige Vivir Sano) in of Lo Espejo, Chile.

== Schedule ==
Date	Time	Round
November 19, 2023	09:30	Pool A
November 19, 2023	09:30	Pool B
November 21, 2023	14:00	Semifinals
November 22, 2023	09:30	Final

== Results ==
=== Final stage ===
The results during the final stage were as follows:

Semi-finals
Rebeca Duarte (ESA)	5
Kristyn Collins (CAN)	0
Karina Martinez (MEX)	4
Joselyn Leon (ECU)	3

Finals
Rebecca Duarte (ESA)	3
Karina Martinez (MEX)	7
Third place match
Kristyn Collins (CAN)	2
Joselyn Leon (ECU)	3

=== Pool ===
The results were as follows:

==== Pool A ====
Athlete	Pld	W	L	PW	PA	Diff	Qualification
Rebeca Duarte (ESA)	2	2	0	14	4	10	Advance to semi-finals
Joselyn Leon (ECU)	2	1	1	6	9	-3	Advance to semi-finals
Michele Lynch (USA)	2	0	2	4	11	-7	

Date	Time	Player 1	Score	Player 2
November 19	09:30	Rebeca Duarte (El Salvador)	7–2	(United States) Michele Lynch
November 19	15:30	Joselyn Leon (Ecuador)	4–2	(United States) Michele Lynch
November 20		Rebeca Duarte (El Salvador)	7–2	(Ecuador) Joselyn Leon

==== Pool B ====
Athlete	Pld	W	L	PW	PA	Diff	Qualification
Karina Martinez (MEX)	2	2	0	16	1	15	Advance to semi-finals
Kristyn Collins (CAN)	2	1	1	8	5	3	Advance to semi-finals
Andrea Guzmán (CHI)	2	0	2	1	19	-18	

Date	Time	Player 1	Score	Player 2
November 19	09:30	Karina Martinez (Mexico)	12–0	(Chile) Andrea Guzmán
November 19	15:30	Kristyn Collins (Canada)	7–1	(Chile) Andrea Guzmán
November 20	09:30	Karina Martinez (Mexico)	4–1	(Canada) Kristyn Collins
