= Boccia at the 2023 Parapan American Games – Men's individual BC3 =

Men's individual BC3 at the 2023 Parapan American Games
- Venue: Choose Healthy Living Center
- Dates: November 19 - November 22
- Competitors: 8 from 8 nations

Medalists
1st place, gold medalist(s)		Mateus Carvalho	Brazil
2nd place, silver medalist(s)		Rodrigo Romero	Argentina
3rd place, bronze medalist(s)		Jesús Romero	Colombia

The men's individual BC3 competition of the boccia events at the 2023 Parapan American Games was held on November 19 - 22 at the Choose Healthy Living Center (Centro Elige Vivir Sano) in of Lo Espejo, Chile.

== Schedule ==
Date	Time	Round
November 19, 2023	13:00	Pool A
November 19, 2023	13:00	Pool B
November 21, 2023	15:10	Semifinals
November 22, 2023	10:40	Final

== Results ==
=== Final stage ===
The results during the final stage were as follows:

Semi-finals
Mateus Carvalho (BRA)	4
Jesús Romero (COL)	1
Dean Acosta (PER)	2
Rodrigo Romero (ARG)	3

Finals
Mateus Carvalho (BRA)	5
Rodrigo Romero (ARG)	4
Third place match
Jesús Romero (COL)	3
Dean Acosta (PER)	2

=== Pool ===
The results were as follows:

==== Pool A ====
Athlete	Pld	W	L	PW	PA	Diff	Qualification
Mateus Carvalho (BRA)	3	3	0	24	4	20	Advance to semi-finals
Rodrigo Romero (ARG)	3	2	1	14	12	2	Advance to semi-finals
Raúl López (MEX)	3	1	2	7	17	-10	
Ryan Rondeau (CAN)	3	0	3	6	18	-12	

Date	Time	Player 1	Score	Player 2
November 19	13:00	Mateus Carvalho (Brazil)	9–0	(Canada) Ryan Rondeau
November 19	13:00	Raúl López (Mexico)	4–4*	(Argentina) Rodrigo Romero
November 19	18:20	Mateus Carvalho (Brazil)	4*–4	(Argentina) Rodrigo Romero
November 19	18:20	Raúl López (Mexico)	3–2	(Canada) Ryan Rondeau
November 20	14:00	Mateus Carvalho (Brazil)	11–0	(Mexico) Raúl López
November 20	14:00	Rodrigo Romero (Argentina)	6–4	(Canada) Ryan Rondeau

==== Pool B ====
Athlete	Pld	W	L	PW	PA	Diff	Qualification
Dean Acosta (PER)	3	3	0	18	8	10	Advance to quarter-finals
Jesús Romero (COL)	3	2	1	18	5	13	Advance to quarter-finals
Neri Tay (GUA)	3	1	2	3	21	-18	
Cristóbal Aranda (CHI)	3	0	3	7	12	-5	

Date	Time	Player 1	Score	Player 2
November 19	13:00	Jesús Romero (Colombia)	10–0	(Guatemala) Neri Tay
November 19	13:00	Dean Acosta (Peru)	5–4	(Chile) Cristóbal Aranda
November 19	18:20	Jesús Romero (Colombia)	4–1	(Chile) Cristóbal Aranda
November 19	18:20	Dean Acosta (Peru)	9–0	(Guatemala) Neri Tay
November 20	14:00	Jesús Romero (Colombia)	4–4*	(Peru) Dean Acosta
November 20	14:00	Cristóbal Aranda (Chile)	2–3	(Guatemala) Neri Tay
