= Cycling at the 2023 Parapan American Games – Men's road time trial H1–5 =

Men's road time trial H1–5 at the 2023 Parapan American Games
- Venue: Streets of Isla de Maipo
- Dates: November 19
- Competitors: 6 from 5 nations
- Winning time: 31:19.05

Medalists
1st place, gold medalist(s)		Eric Pinney	United States
2nd place, silver medalist(s)		Brandon Lyons	United States
3rd place, bronze medalist(s)		Charles Moreau	Canada

The men's individual road time trial H1–5 competition of the cycling events at the 2023 Parapan American Games was held on November 19 on the Streets of Isla de Maipo, Chile.

== Schedule ==
Date	Time	Round
November 19, 2023	12:30	Final

== Results ==
The results were as follows:

Rank	Class	Rider	Nation	Time
1st place, gold medalist(s)	H3	Eric Pinney	United States	31:19.05
2nd place, silver medalist(s)	H3	Brandon Lyons	United States	31:38.33
3rd place, bronze medalist(s)	H3	Charles Moreau	Canada	31:46.65
4	H3	Oscar Biga	Argentina	32:33.02
5	H4	Ulisses Freitas	Brazil	32:42.69
6	H5	Alfredo de los Santos	United States	33:32.59
7	H3	Richard Espinoza	Venezuela	34:52.05
8	H3	Sebastián Morales	Chile	35:47.66
9	H3	Ricardo Rincón	Mexico	35:48.59
10	H5	Ronan Da Motta	Brazil	36:55.51
11	H4	Andrew Hairston	Virgin Islands	37:39.64
	H3	Ivan Cáceres	Paraguay	DSQ
