= Boccia at the 2023 Parapan American Games – Men's individual BC2 =

Men's individual BC2 at the 2023 Parapan American Games
- Venue: Choose Healthy Living Center
- Dates: November 19 - November 22
- Competitors: 9 from 7 nations

Medalists
1st place, gold medalist(s)		Maciel Santos	Brazil
2nd place, silver medalist(s)		Danik Allard	Canada
3rd place, bronze medalist(s)		Luis Cristaldo	Argentina

The men's individual BC2 competition of the boccia events at the 2023 Parapan American Games was held on November 19 - 22 at the Choose Healthy Living Center (Centro Elige Vivir Sano) in of Lo Espejo, Chile.

== Schedule ==
Date	Time	Round
November 19, 2023	10:40	Pool A
November 19, 2023	10:40	Pool B
November 19, 2023	11:50	Pool C
November 21, 2023	11:50	Quarterfinals
November 21, 2023	17:50	Semifinals
November 22, 2023	09:30	Final

== Results ==
=== Final stage ===
The results during the final stage were as follows:

Quarter-finals
Iuri Tauan Silva (BRA)	4
Mario Sayes (ESA)	5
Dubier Paredes (MEX)	2
Luis Cristaldo (ARG)	5

Semi-finals
Danik Allard (CAN)	7
Mario Sayes (ESA)	1
Luis Cristaldo (ARG)	1
Maciel Santos (BRA)	4

Finals
Danik Allard (CAN)	1
Maciel Santos (BRA)	6
Third place match
Mario Sayes (ESA)	2
Luis Cristaldo (ARG)	5

=== Pool ===
The results were as follows:

==== Pool A ====
Athlete	Pld	W	L	PW	PA	Diff	Qualification
Danik Allard (CAN)	2	2	0	9	7	2	Advance to quarter-finals
Luis Cristaldo (ARG)	2	1	1	9	9	0	Advance to quarter-finals
Jorge Delgado (ECU)	2	0	2	5	7	-2	

Date	Time	Player 1	Score	Player 2
November 19	10:40	Luis Cristaldo (Argentina)	7–1	(Ecuador) Jorge Delgado
November 19	17:10	Danik Allard (Canada)	11–1	(Ecuador) Jorge Delgado
November 20	15:30	Luis Cristaldo (Argentina)	2–7	(Canada) Danik Allard

==== Pool B ====
Athlete	Pld	W	L	PW	PA	Diff	Qualification
Maciel Santos (BRA)	2	2	0	19	2	17	Advance to quarter-finals
Mario Sayes (ESA)	2	1	1	8	16	-8	Advance to quarter-finals
Jonatan Aquino (ARG)	2	0	2	2	11	-9	

Date	Time	Player 1	Score	Player 2
November 19	10:40	Maciel Santos (Brazil)	16–0	(El Salvador) Mario Sayes
November 19	17:10	Jonatan Aquino (Argentina)	0–8	(El Salvador) Mario Sayes
November 20	15:30	Maciel Santos (Brazil)	3–2	(Argentina) Jonatan Aquino

==== Pool C ====
Athlete	Pld	W	L	PW	PA	Diff	Qualification
Dubier Paredes (MEX)	2	2	0	9	7	2	Advance to quarter-finals
Iuri Tauan Saraiva (BRA)	2	1	1	9	9	0	Advance to quarter-finals
Javier Bastías (CHI)	2	0	2	5	7	-2	

Date	Time	Player 1	Score	Player 2
November 19	11:50	Dubier Paredes (Mexico)	3–2	(Chile) Javier Bastías
November 19	17:10	Iuri Tauan Saraiva (Brazil)	4–3	(Chile) Javier Bastías
November 20	15:30	Dubier Paredes (Mexico)	6–5	(Brazil) Iuri Tauan Saraiva
