= Boccia at the 2023 Parapan American Games – Women's individual BC3 =

Women's individual BC3 at the 2023 Parapan American Games
- Venue: Choose Healthy Living Center
- Dates: November 19 - November 22
- Competitors: 11 from 9 nations

Medalists
1st place, gold medalist(s)		Evelyn de Oliveira	Brazil
2nd place, silver medalist(s)		Stefanía Ferrando	Argentina
3rd place, bronze medalist(s)		Niurka Callupe	Peru

The women's individual BC3 competition of the boccia events at the 2023 Parapan American Games was held on November 19 - 22 at the Choose Healthy Living Center (Centro Elige Vivir Sano) in of Lo Espejo, Chile.

== Schedule ==
Date	Time	Round
November 19, 2023	15:40	Pool A
November 19, 2023	15:40	Pool B
November 19, 2023	15:40	Pool C
November 21, 2023	11:50	Quarter-finals
November 21, 2023	15:10	Semifinals
November 22, 2023	10:40	Final

== Results ==
=== Final stage ===
The results during the final stage were as follows:

Quarter-finals
Niurka Callupe (PER)	4
Evani Calado (BRA)	3
Stefanía Ferrando (ARG)	10
María Pancca (PER)	0

Semi-finals
Evelyn de Oliveira (BRA)	3
Niurka Callupe (PER)	3
Stefanía Ferrando (ARG)	8
Javiera Quintriqueo (CHI)	1

Finals
Evelyn de Oliveira (BRA)	5
Stefanía Ferrando (ARG)	4
Third place match
Niurka Callupe (PER)	11
Javiera Quintriqueo (CHI)	0

=== Pool ===
The results were as follows:

==== Pool A ====
Athlete	Pld	W	L	PW	PA	Diff	Qualification
Evelyn de Oliveira (BRA)	3	3	0	30	2	28	Advance to semifinals
María Pancca (PER)	3	2	1	18	10	8	Advance to quarter-finals
Joëlle Guérette (CAN)	3	1	2	8	18	-10	
Natalie Chastain (USA)	3	0	3	3	29	-26	

Date	Time	Player 1	Score	Player 2
November 19	15:40	Evelyn de Oliveira (Brazil)	8–1	(Peru) María Pancca
November 19	15:40	Joëlle Guérette (Canada)	6–2	(United States) Natalie Chastain
November 20	11:50	Evelyn de Oliveira (Brazil)	14–0	(United States) Natalie Chastain
November 20	11:50	Joëlle Guérette (Canada)	1–8	(Peru) María Pancca
November 20	17:50	Natalie Chastain (United States)	1–9	(Peru) María Pancca
November 20	17:50	Evelyn de Oliveira (Brazil)	8–1	(Canada) Joëlle Guérette

==== Pool B ====
Athlete	Pld	W	L	PW	PA	Diff	Qualification
Javiera Quintriqueo (CHI)	3	2	1	16	6	10	Advance to semifinals
Evani Calado (BRA)	3	2	1	20	8	12	Advance to quarter-finals
María del Mar Velez (COL)	3	2	1	22	9	13	
Eimy Losley (GUA)	3	0	3	0	35	-35	

Date	Time	Player 1	Score	Player 2
November 19	15:40	Evani Calado (Brazil)	12–0	(Guatemala) Eimy Losley
November 19	15:40	María del Mar Velez (Colombia)	3–4	(Chile) Javiera Quintriqueo
November 20	11:50	Evani Calado (Brazil)	3*–3	(Chile) Javiera Quintriqueo
November 20	11:50	María del Mar Velez (Colombia)	14–0	(Guatemala) Eimy Losley
November 20	17:50	Evani Calado (Brazil)	5–5*	(Colombia) María del Mar Velez
November 20	17:50	Javiera Quintriqueo (Chile)	9–0	(Guatemala) Eimy Losley

==== Pool C ====
Athlete	Pld	W	L	PW	PA	Diff	Qualification
Stefanía Ferrando (ARG)	2	2	0	21	4	17	Advance to quarter-finals
Niurka Callupe (PER)	2	1	1	11	7	4	Advance to quarter-finals
Lucía Barboza (URU)	2	0	2	2	23	-21	

Date	Time	Player 1	Score	Player 2
November 19	15:40	Stefanía Ferrando (Argentina)	16–0	(Uruguay) Lucía Barboza
November 20	11:50	Niurka Callupe (Peru)	7–2	(Uruguay) Lucía Barboza
November 20	17:50	Stefanía Ferrando (Argentina)	5–4	(Peru) Niurka Callupe
