= Athletics at the 2023 Parapan American Games – Men's 100 metres T52 =

Men's 100 metres T52 at the 2023 Parapan American Games
- Venue: Mario Recordón Athletics Training Center
- Dates: November 23
- Competitors: 5 from 4 nations
- Winning time: 17.67

Medalists
1st place, gold medalist(s)		Anthony Bouchard	Canada
2nd place, silver medalist(s)		Salvador Hernández	Mexico
3rd place, bronze medalist(s)		Cristian Eduardo Torres	Colombia

The men's T52 100 metres competition of the athletics events at the 2023 Parapan American Games was held on November 23 at the Mario Recordón Athletics Training Center within the Julio Martínez National Stadium of Santiago, Chile.

== Records ==
Before this competition, the existing world and Pan American Games records were as follows:

World record	Raymond Martin (USA)	16.41	Arbon, Switzerland	May 30, 2019
Parapan American Games record	Marcos Castillo (VEN)	17.30	Rio de Janeiro, Brazil	August 13, 2007
Americas record	Raymond Martin (USA)	16.41	Arbon, Switzerland	May 30, 2019

== Schedule ==
Date	Time	Round
November 23, 2023	18:19	Final

== Results ==
All times shown are in seconds.

KEY:	q	Fastest non-qualifiers	Q	Qualified	PR	Parapan Games record	NR	National record	SB	Seasonal best	DQ	Disqualified

=== Final ===
The results were as follows:
Wind: +0.8 m/s

Rank	Lane	Name	Nationality	Time	Notes
1st place, gold medalist(s)	5	Anthony Bouchard	Canada	17.67	SB
2nd place, silver medalist(s)	4	Salvador Hernández	Mexico	17.70	
3rd place, bronze medalist(s)	3	Cristian Eduardo Torres	Colombia	17.76	
4	6	Leonardo de Jesús Pérez	Mexico	17.90	
5	7	Nicholas McCoy	United States	19.22	SB
