= Athletics at the 2023 Parapan American Games – Men's 1500 metres T20 =

Men's 1500 metres T20 at the 2023 Parapan American Games
- Venue: Mario Recordón Athletics Training Center
- Dates: November 21
- Competitors: 7 from 7 nations
- Winning time: 4:10.71

Medalists
1st place, gold medalist(s)		Samuel Guarín	Colombia
2nd place, silver medalist(s)		Michael Barber	Canada
3rd place, bronze medalist(s)		Carmelo Rivera	Puerto Rico

The men's T20 1500 metres competition of the athletics events at the 2023 Parapan American Games was held on November 21 at the Mario Recordón Athletics Training Center within the Julio Martínez National Stadium of Santiago, Chile.

== Records ==
Prior to this competition, the existing world and Pan American Games records were as follows:

World record	Michael Brannigan (USA)	3:45.50	New York, United States	February 11, 2017
Parapan American Games record	Michael Brannigan (USA)	4:04.32	Toronto, Canada	August 10, 2015

== Schedule ==
Date	Time	Round
November 21, 2023	17:29	Final

== Results ==
All times shown are in seconds.

KEY:	q	Fastest non-qualifiers	Q	Qualified	PR	Parapan Games record	NR	National record	SB	Seasonal best	DQ	Disqualified

=== Final ===
The results were as follows:

Rank	Lane	Name	Nationality	Time	Notes
1st place, gold medalist(s)	4	Samuel Guarín	Colombia	4:10.71	SB
2nd place, silver medalist(s)	1	Michael Barber	Canada	4:11.99	
3rd place, bronze medalist(s)	6	Carmelo Rivera	Puerto Rico	4:13.36	SB
4	5	Luis Paiva	Venezuela	4:14.93	
5	3	Wladimir Palma	Chile	4:17.19	
6	2	Juan Gabriel Pugo	Ecuador	4:17.31	
7	7	Pedro Francisco Pérez	Mexico	4:18.20	SB
