= Zion Redington =

American wheelchair rugby player

Personal information
- Born: June 3, 2006 (age 20) China
- Home town: Birmingham, Alabama, U.S.

Sport
- Sport: Wheelchair rugby
- Disability: Ectrodactyly
- Disability class: 3.5
Medal record
Wheelchair rugby
Representing the United States
Paralympic Games
Silver medal – second place	2024 Paris	Team
Parapan American Games
Gold medal – first place	2023 Santiago	Team

Zion Redington (born June 3, 2006) is an American wheelchair rugby player and member of the United States national wheelchair rugby team. He represented the United States at the 2024 Summer Paralympics.

== Career ==
Redington represented the United States at the 2023 Parapan American Games and won a gold medal in wheelchair rugby. As a result, Team USA automatically qualified for the 2024 Summer Paralympics. On April 30, 2024, he was selected to represent the United States at the 2024 Summer Paralympics. At 18 years old, he is youngest player to ever compete on the team.

== Personal life ==
Redington was born in China with only one finger per hand and one toe per foot due to ectrodactyly. He was adopted at two years old and moved to Franklin, Tennessee.
