= Brad Hudspeth =

American wheelchair rugby player

Personal information
- Born: February 25, 1989 (age 37) Stilwell, Kansas, U.S.

Sport
- Sport: Wheelchair rugby
- Disability class: 1.0
Medal record
Wheelchair rugby
Representing the United States
Paralympic Games
Silver medal – second place	2024 Paris	Team
Parapan American Games
Gold medal – first place	2023 Santiago	Team

Brad Hudspeth (born February 25, 1989) is an American wheelchair rugby player and member of the United States national wheelchair rugby team. He represented the United States at the 2024 Summer Paralympics.

== Career ==
Hudspeth represented the United States at the 2023 Parapan American Games and won a gold medal in wheelchair rugby. As a result, Team USA automatically qualified for the 2024 Summer Paralympics. On April 30, 2024, he was selected to represent the United States at the 2024 Summer Paralympics.

== Personal life ==
In August 2005, Hudspeth broke his neck while diving at Lake Quivira. Instead of diving from the end of the pier, he dove from the side, unaware that the water was less than four feet deep. In 2007, he was awarded $16 million by a jury.
