= Dennis Connors =

American para-cyclist and para-climber (born 1985)

Personal information
- Nationality: American
- Born: May 22, 1985 (age 41)
- Home town: Beaverton, Oregon, U.S.
- Education: University of Utah

Sport
- Sport: Para-cycling, Paraclimbing
- Disability: Ataxia
- Disability class: T2 (Cycling), RP2 (Climbing)
Medal record
Men's Para-cycling
Representing the United States
Paralympic Games
Silver medal – second place	2024 Paris	Road race T1–2
Road World Championships
Gold medal – first place	2023 Glasgow	Road race T2
Gold medal – first place	2024 Zurich	Road race T2
Silver medal – second place	2022 Baie-Comeau	Road race T2
Bronze medal – third place	2021 Cascais	Time trial T2
Bronze medal – third place	2024 Zurich	Time trial T2
Bronze medal – third place	2026 Huntsville	Road time trial T2
Parapan American Games
Gold medal – first place	2023 Santiago	Road race T1–2
Silver medal – second place	2023 Santiago	Mixed time trial T1–2

Dennis Connors (born May 22, 1985) is an American para-cyclist and para-climber. He has won multiple national and international medals in para-cycling, including a silver medal at the 2024 Summer Paralympics. In addition to cycling, he is a three-time USA Climbing Para National Champion.

== Career ==
=== Para-cycling ===
Connors made his international debut for the United States at the 2021 UCI Para-cycling Road World Championships and won a bronze medal in the road race T2 event. He again represented the United States at the 2022 UCI Para-cycling Road World Championships and won a silver medal in the road race T2 event.

In August 2023, he represented the United States at the 2023 UCI Para-cycling Road World Championships and won a gold medal in the road race T2 event. In November 2023, he represented the United States at the 2023 Parapan American Games and won a gold medal in the road race T1–2 and a silver medal in the mixed road time trial T1–2 event.

On July 8, 2024, Connors qualified to represent the United States at the 2024 Summer Paralympics. He competed in the road race T1–2 event and won a silver medal.

=== Para-climbing ===
In addition to his success in para-cycling, Connors is an accomplished para-climber. He has competed in multiple national championships and international competitions in the Men’s RP2 category, which includes athletes with impairments affecting two limbs.

In March 2025, he won his third USA Climbing Para National Championship, securing a spot on the U.S. National Para-Climbing Team. His victory qualified him to represent Team USA at the 2025 Paraclimbing World Cups and the 2025 Combined Able-bodied and Para World Championship in Seoul, South Korea.

A lifelong climber, Connors was a member of the able-bodied U.S. Junior Climbing Team before his military career. With sport climbing added to the Los Angeles 2028 Paralympic Games program, Connors has expressed his goal of making the U.S. Paralympic climbing team.

== Personal life ==
Connors was a member of the United States Marine Corps as a linguist from 2003 to 2012. He served three deployments to Iraq, and sustained multiple traumatic brain injuries causing ataxia. In 2020, he suffered a stroke, which reduced the mobility in his left side. He has said he took up cycling in part to help manage post-traumatic stress disorder, and that he had at times considered suicide.

Connors lives in Beaverton, Oregon, with his wife, Krista, and their two children. The family spends time outdoors together, including biking, kayaking, climbing and skiing in Bend and Lake Tahoe.
