= Athletics at the 2023 Parapan American Games – Men's 400 metres T52 =

Men's 400 metres T52 at the 2023 Parapan American Games
- Venue: Mario Recordón Athletics Training Center
- Dates: November 21
- Competitors: 5 from 4 nations
- Winning time: 1:01.72

Medalists
1st place, gold medalist(s)		Leonardo de Jesús Pérez	Mexico
2nd place, silver medalist(s)		Cristian Eduardo Torres	Colombia
3rd place, bronze medalist(s)		Anthony Bouchard	Canada

The men's T52 400 metres competition of the athletics events at the 2023 Parapan American Games was held on November 21 at the Mario Recordón Athletics Training Center within the Julio Martínez National Stadium of Santiago, Chile.

== Records ==
Prior to this competition, the existing world and Pan American Games records were as follows:

World record	Maxime Carabin (BEL)	54.19	Paris, France	July 13, 2023
Parapan American Games record	Raymond Martin (USA)	57.72	Toronto, Canada	August 13, 2015

== Schedule ==
Date	Time	Round
November 21, 2023	18:58	Final

== Results ==
All times shown are in seconds.

KEY:	q	Fastest non-qualifiers	Q	Qualified	PR	Parapan Games record	NR	National record	SB	Seasonal best	DQ	Disqualified

=== Final ===
The results were as follows:

Rank	Lane	Name	Nationality	Time	Notes
1st place, gold medalist(s)	4	Leonardo de Jesús Pérez	Mexico	1:01.72	AR
2nd place, silver medalist(s)	5	Cristian Eduardo Torres	Colombia	1:03.07	
3rd place, bronze medalist(s)	3	Anthony Bouchard	Canada	1:03.15	SB
4	6	Salvador Hernández	Mexico	1:03.16	SB
5	7	Nicholas McCoy	United States	1:04.10	SB
