= Jeff Butler (wheelchair rugby) =

American wheelchair rugby player

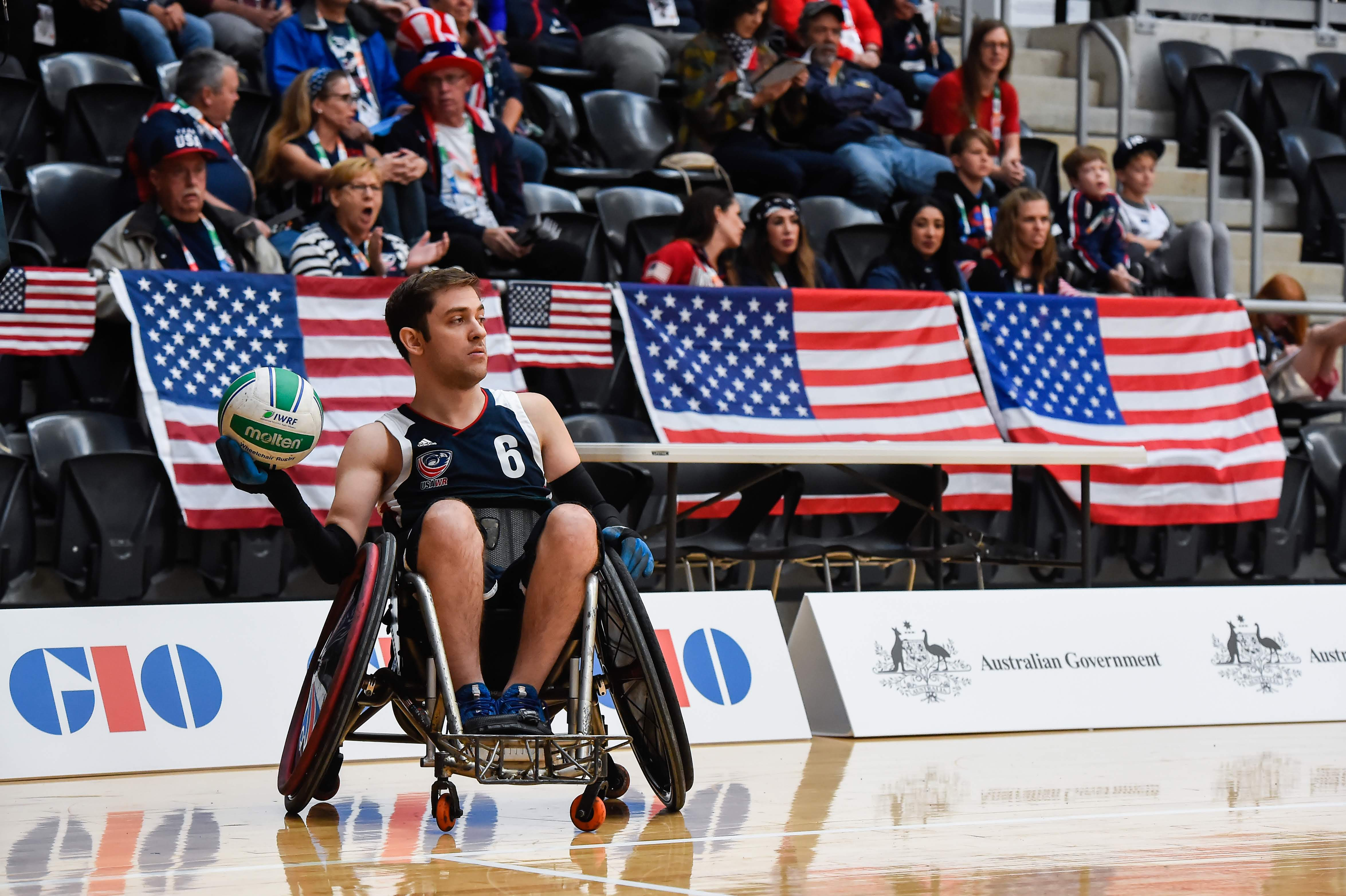
- Jeff Butler inbounds the ball during the 2018 Wheelchair Rugby World Championship

Personal information
- Born: June 12, 1990 (age 36) Fort Wayne, Indiana, U.S.
- Education: University of Texas at Austin Stanford University Graduate School of Business

Sport
- Sport: Wheelchair rugby
- Disability: C5-6 spinal cord injury
- Disability class: 0.5
Medal record
Wheelchair rugby
Representing the United States
Paralympic Games
Silver medal – second place	2016 Rio de Janeiro	Team
Silver medal – second place	2020 Tokyo	Team
Silver medal – second place	2024 Paris	Team
Parapan American Games
Gold medal – first place	2019 Lima	Team
Gold medal – first place	2023 Santiago	Team
Silver medal – second place	2015 Toronto	Team

Jeff Butler (born June 12, 1990) is an American wheelchair rugby player, entrepreneur, and member of the United States national wheelchair rugby team. A three-time Paralympian, he won silver medals at the 2016 Summer Paralympics in Rio de Janeiro, the 2020 Summer Paralympics in Tokyo, and the 2024 Summer Paralympics in Paris. He is a graduate of the University of Texas at Austin and the Stanford Graduate School of Business, and has built his career at the intersection of healthcare, and technology. He also serves in governance roles within the United States Olympic & Paralympic Committee ecosystem.

== Early life ==
Butler was born in Fort Wayne, Indiana.

At age 13, Butler sustained a broken neck at the C5-6 vertebral level in a traffic accident, leaving him with quadriplegia. The injury required extensive rehabilitation and marked a turning point in his life. He has described it as his "single most defining moment", the start of a path of independence and elite athletic competition that he could not have anticipated beforehand.

Butler enrolled at Indiana University before transferring to the University of Texas at Austin, where he joined the local wheelchair rugby club. He graduated from the McCombs School of Business in 2014 with a bachelor's degree in Management Information Systems.

Following two Paralympic Games appearances, Butler was admitted to the Stanford Graduate School of Business and completed his MBA after competing at the 2020 Summer Paralympics in Tokyo.

== Wheelchair rugby career ==
=== Introduction to the sport ===
Butler was introduced to wheelchair rugby by a friend during his rehabilitation following his spinal cord injury. After watching his first game, he was drawn in by the physicality and intensity of the sport. He began playing competitively with a club team in Indianapolis while still in high school in Fort Wayne. After enrolling at Indiana University, he continued making the trip to Indianapolis to practice with the same club. He later transferred to the University of Texas at Austin, where he joined the Texas Stampede and set a goal of earning a spot on the United States national team.

=== National team ===
Butler began trying out for the U.S. national team in 2010 and earned a roster spot in 2015, five years after his first tryout. He then became an established member of the squad, playing as a low-point classification (0.5) defensive specialist.

=== Paralympic Games ===
Butler made his Paralympic debut at the 2016 Summer Paralympics in Rio de Janeiro, Brazil. The U.S. team reached the gold medal match against Australia, losing 59–58 in double overtime. Butler and Team USA were awarded the silver medal.

At the 2020 Summer Paralympics in Tokyo, Japan (held in 2021 following a postponement due to the COVID-19 pandemic), Butler again represented the United States. The U.S. team won the silver medal, falling in the gold medal match.

Butler was selected to compete at the 2024 Summer Paralympics in Paris, France, announced on April 30, 2024. The U.S. team again reached the final, where they were defeated by Japan 48–41, earning Team USA its third consecutive Paralympic silver medal and its eighth consecutive Paralympic medal in the sport.

=== World Championships ===
Butler was part of the U.S. squad that won a bronze medal at the 2018 Wheelchair Rugby World Championship in Sydney, Australia.

=== Parapan American Games ===
Butler represented the United States at the 2015 Parapan American Games in Toronto, Canada, where Team USA earned a silver medal, losing to the host country in the gold medal match. Butler again competed in the 2019 Parapan American Games in Lima, Peru, where Team USA won the gold medal in wheelchair rugby, and in the 2023 Parapan American Games in Santiago, Chile, where Team USA took gold and secured automatic qualification for the 2024 Summer Paralympics.

== Personal life ==
=== Business career ===
After graduating from the University of Texas, Butler launched VIPatient, a telehealth startup building a web and mobile platform to help healthcare providers deliver patient care. He has described it as an intentional first venture designed to accelerate learning about company-building, and later characterized it as a "traditional failure" in terms of product-market fit, but not a personal failure given the foundational lessons it provided.

Butler subsequently worked at Vantage Mobility International (VMI), a leading manufacturer of wheelchair-accessible vehicles, where he was a named inventor on U.S. Patent No. 11,332,073 the ParkSmart system, the first integrated vehicle sensor of its kind in the industry, designed to detect when another vehicle or object is blocking a wheelchair user's ramp access and alert the obstruction with an audible warning. VMI unveiled ParkSmart in November 2020 and it became a standard feature across its Honda Odyssey, Toyota Sienna, and Chrysler Pacifica accessible van lines.

Butler then pursued his MBA at Stanford before returning to full-time training and competition with USA Wheelchair Rugby through the 2024 Paralympics. Following the Paris Games, he joined a pre-Series A health technology startup in the San Francisco Bay Area.

Butler has drawn explicit parallels between elite Paralympic sport and entrepreneurship, describing both as requiring sustained persistence, tolerance for uncertainty, and an element of well-timed opportunity.

=== Olympic and Paralympic governance ===
Butler serves as a Director on the board of the U.S. Olympic & Paralympic Endowment (USOPE), the investment endowment that supports Team USA athletes.

He also serves as an advisor to the USOPC Finance, Audit & Risk Committee, a committee of the United States Olympic & Paralympic Committee Board of Directors responsible for financial oversight, budgeting, audit processes, and risk management.
