= Brandon Lyons =

American para-cyclist (born 1990)

Personal information
- Born: June 8, 1990 (age 36) Langhorne, Pennsylvania, U.S.
- Education: Pennsylvania State University

Sport
- Sport: Para-cycling
- Disability class: H3
Medal record
Men's Para-cycling
Representing the United States
Road World Championships
Silver medal – second place	2019 Emmen	Mixed team relay H1–5
Bronze medal – third place	2023 Glasgow	Mixed team relay H1–5
Parapan American Games
Silver medal – second place	2019 Lima	Road race H3–5
Silver medal – second place	2019 Lima	Mixed time trial H1–5
Silver medal – second place	2023 Santiago	Road time trial H1–5
Bronze medal – third place	2023 Santiago	Road race H3–5

Brandon Lyons (born June 8, 1990) is an American Para-cyclist. He represented the United States at the 2024 Summer Paralympics.

== Career ==
In 2017, Lyons became the first handcyclist resident athlete at the U.S. Olympic & Paralympic Training Center in Colorado Springs, Colorado.

Lyons made his international debut for the United States at the 2019 UCI Para-cycling Road World Championships and won a silver medal in the mixed team relay H1–5 event.

Lyons was training to compete at the 2020 Summer Paralympics, however, an infection in his leg that progressed to the early stages of sepsis ended his chances of competing at the Paralympics.

In August 2023, he represented the United States at the 2023 UCI Para-cycling Road World Championships and won a bronze medal in the mixed team relay H1–5 event. In November 2023, he represented the United States at the 2023 Parapan American Games and won a silver medal in the road time trial H1–5 event and a bronze medal in the road race H3–5 event.

On July 8, 2024, Lyons qualified to represent the United States at the 2024 Summer Paralympics.

== Personal life ==
On May 24, 2014, during a vacation in Ocean City, Maryland, Lyons dove from a pier into shallow water breaking his T5/T6 vertebrae which left him paralyzed from the chest down. In 2015, he underwent a surgery where they opened his spinal cord and injected 1.2 million stem cells at his injury location, as part of a stem cell clinical trial.
