= Mindy Cook =

American goalball player

Personal information
- Born: September 23, 1988 (age 37) Celina, Ohio, U.S.
- Home town: Columbus, Ohio, U.S.
- Height: 5 ft 4 in (163 cm)

Sport
- Country: United States
- Sport: Goalball
- Disability: Aniridia
- Coached by: Jake Czechowski
Medal record
Women's goalball
Representing United States
Paralympic Games
Silver medal – second place	2020 Tokyo	Team
Parapan American Games
Silver medal – second place	2023 Santiago	Team

Mindy Cook (born September 23, 1988) is an American goalball player who represented the United States at the 2020 Summer Paralympics.

== Career ==
Cook represented the United States at the 2020 Summer Paralympics in goalball and won a silver medal.

== Personal life ==
Cook was born with aniridia, a genetic condition where the iris of the eye does not develop.
