= Paula Caballeros =

Colombian para-cyclist (born 2000)

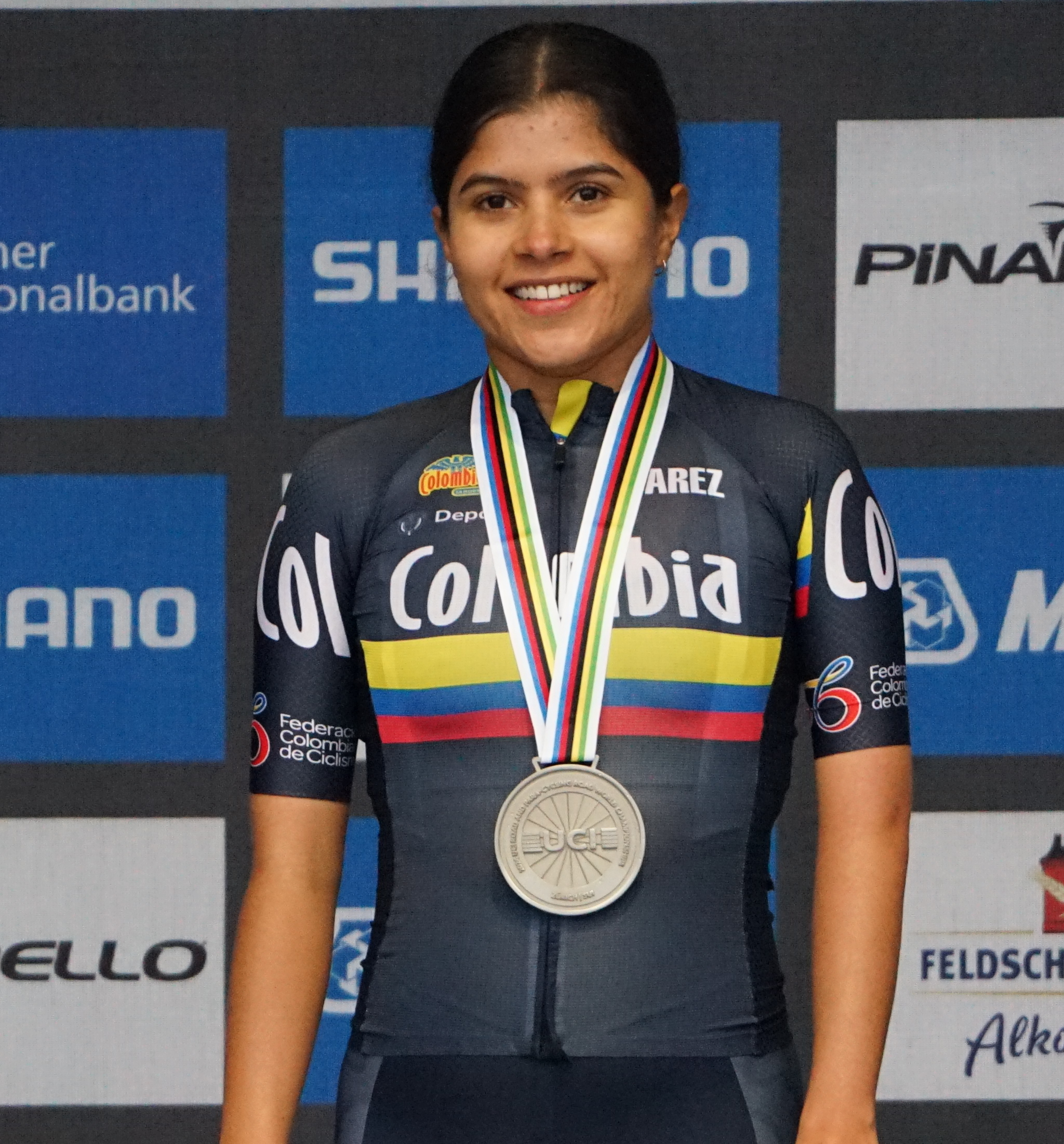
- Caballeros at the 2024 World Championships

Personal information
- Full name: Paula Daniela Caballeros Pérez
- Nationality: Colombian
- Born: 14 April 2000 (age 26)

Sport
- Sport: Para-cycling
- Disability class: C3
Medal record
Representing Colombia
Women's para-cycling
Road World Championships
Silver medal – second place	2024 Zurich	Road race C3
Bronze medal – third place	2024 Zurich	Time trial C3
Track World Championships
Silver medal – second place	2024 Rio de Janeiro	Scratch race C3
Silver medal – second place	2025 Rio de Janeiro	Scratch race C3
Parapan American Games
Bronze medal – third place	2023 Santiago	Road race C1–3
Bronze medal – third place	2023 Santiago	Individual pursuit C1–3

Paula Daniela Caballeros Pérez (born 14 March 2000) is a Colombian para-cyclist who competes in road and track events.

== Career ==
In November 2023, Caballeros represented Colombia at the 2023 Parapan American Games and won bronze medals in the road race C1–3 and pursuit C1–3 events.

In March 2024, Caballeros represented Colombia at the 2024 UCI Para-cycling Track World Championships and won a silver medal in the scratch race C3 event. In September 2024, she won a silver medal in the road race and a bronze medal in the time trial C3 events, at the 2024 UCI Para-cycling Road World Championships.
