= Stefanía Ferrando =

Argentine Paralympic boccia player

Personal information
- Born: 30 November 1993 (age 32) Gualeguay, Entre Ríos, Argentina

Sport
- Country: Argentina
- Sport: Boccia
- Disability class: BC3
Medal record
Women's boccia
Representing Argentina
Paralympic Games
| Bronze medal – third place | 2024 Paris | Pairs BC3 |
Parapan American Games
| Gold medal – first place | 2023 Santiago | Pairs BC3 |
| Silver medal – second place | 2023 Santiago | Individual BC3 |

Stefanía Ferrando (born 30 November 1993) is an Argentine boccia player. She is a two-time medalist at the Parapan American Games and a bronze medalist at the Summer Paralympics.

== Early life ==
Ferrando was born on 30 November 1993 with spinal muscular atrophy.

== Career ==
Ferrando won the 2019 Americas Regional Championships, enabling her to qualify for the 2020 Summer Paralympics in Tokyo. In Tokyo 2020, she was place in Pool E of the mixed individual BC3 event, where she finished in third place, failing to qualify for the quarterfinal. Ferrando competed in two events at the 2023 Parapan American Games, winning the silver medal in the individual BC3 event and the gold medal in the pairs BC3 event, having been paired with Rodrigo Romero in the latter.

Ferrando represented Argentina at two events the 2024 Summer Paralympics. In the women's BC3 event she qualified for the quarterfinals where she lost to Jamieson Leeson, the latter in whom went on to win the silver medal. Ferrando and Romero also competed in the pairs BC3 event, where they won the bronze medal.
