= Goalball at the 2023 Parapan American Games =

Goalball competitions at the 2023 Parapan American Games

- Goalball pictogram
- Venue: Paralympic Training Center
- Dates: 18 – 24 November 2023
- No. of events: 2 (1 men, 1 women)
- Competitors: 95 from 10 nations

Goalball competitions at the 2023 Parapan American Games in Santiago, Chile were held at the Paralympic Training Center from 18 to 24 November 2023.

The winner in each tournament qualified for the 2024 Summer Paralympics.

== Participating nations ==
There are 95 players from 10 nations participating in the games.

- Argentina (12)
- Brazil (12)
- Canada (12)
- Chile (12) (Host)
- Colombia (6)
- Guatemala (6)
- Mexico (12)
- Peru (5)
- United States (12)
- Venezuela (6)

== Medal summary ==
=== Medal table ===
* Host nation (Chile)

| Rank | Nation | Gold | Silver | Bronze | Total |
|---|---|---|---|---|---|
| 1 | Brazil | 1 | 0 | 1 | 2 |
| 1 | Canada | 1 | 0 | 1 | 2 |
| 3 | United States | 0 | 2 | 0 | 2 |
| Totals (3 entries) | | 2 | 2 | 2 | 6 |

=== Medalists ===
| Event | Gold | Silver | Bronze |
|---|---|---|---|
| Men's tournament | Brazil (BRA); Paulo Ferreira; Leomon Moreno; Josemárcio Sousa; Romário Marques; Emerson Ernesto; André Botelho | United States (USA); Walter Merren; Mikael Faison; Zachary Buhler; Russell Young; Hayden Simpson; Caleb Christian | Canada (CAN); Ahmad Zeividavi; Steven Brice Parker; Aaron Prevost; Lorne Blair Nesbitt; Allen Douglas Ripley; Jeffrey Scott |
| Women's tournament | Canada (CAN); Whitney Bogart; Meghan Mahon; Emma-leigh Heather; Tracy Baldock; Amy Burk; Maryam Salehizadeh | United States (USA); Alessandra Lawson; Lisa Czechowski; Asya Miller; Amanda Dennis; Eliana Mason; Mindy Cook | Brazil (BRA); Ana Gabriely Brito; Ana Carolina Duarte; Moniza de Lima; Kátia Ferreira; Danielle Longhini; Jéssica Vitorino |

== See also ==
- Goalball at the 2024 Summer Paralympics
