= Whitney Bogart =

Canadian goalball player (born 1986)

Personal information
- Born: 21 April 1986 (age 40) Thunder Bay, Ontario
- Home town: Marathon, Ontario, Canada

Sport
- Country: Canada
- Sport: Goalball
- Disability: Albinism
Medal record
Women's Goalball
Representing Canada
World Championships
Gold medal – first place	2006	Team
Gold medal – first place	2011	Team
Bronze medal – third place	2015	Team
Parapan American Games
Gold medal – first place	2023 Santiago	Team
Bronze medal – third place	2011 Guadalajara	Team
Bronze medal – third place	2015 Toronto	Team
Bronze medal – third place	2019 Lima	Team

Whitney Bogart (née Burk, born 21 April 1986) is a Canadian goalball player who competes in international level events.

She is the sister in law of goalball teammate Amy Burk who married Whitney's twin brother, Tyler.
