= Meghan Mahon =

Canadian goalball player

Personal information
- Born: 15 January 1996 (age 30) Timmins, Ontario, Canada

Sport
- Sport: Goalball
- Disability: Achromatopsia
Medal record
Representing Canada
Parapan American Games
Gold medal – first place	2023 Santiago	Women's tournament
Bronze medal – third place	2019 Lima	Women's tournament

Meghan Mahon (born 15 January 1996) is a Canadian goalball player who competes in international goalball competitions. She is a Parapan American Games champion and has competed at the 2016, 2020 and 2024 Summer Paralympics.
