= Wheelchair rugby at the 2023 Parapan American Games =

Wheelchair rugby competitions at the 2023 Parapan American Games

- Wheelchair rugby pictogram
- Venue: Training Center for Collective Sport
- Dates: 18 – 23 November 2023
- No. of events: 1 (1 mixed)
- Competitors: 72 from 6 nations

Medalists
1st place, gold medalist(s)		United States
2nd place, silver medalist(s)		Canada
3rd place, bronze medalist(s)		Brazil

Wheelchair rugby competitions at the 2023 Parapan American Games in Santiago, Chile were held at the Training Center for Collective Sport from 18 to 23 November 2023.

The winner of the competition was automatically qualified to the 2024 Summer Paralympics.

== Participating nations ==
There are 72 players from 6 nations participating in the games.

- Argentina (12)
- Brazil (12)
- Canada (12)
- Chile (12) (Host)
- Colombia (12)
- United States (12)

== Medal summary ==
=== Medal table ===
* Host nation (Chile)

Rank	Nation	Gold	Silver	Bronze	Total
1	United States	1	0	0	1
2	Canada	0	1	0	1
3	Brazil	0	0	1	1
Totals (3 entries)		1	1	1	3

=== Medalists ===
Event	Gold	Silver	Bronze
Mixed tournament	United States (USA); Travis Baker; Chuck Aoki; Jeff Butler; Sarah Adam; Eric Newby; Lee Fredette; Josh O'Neill; Clayton Brackett; Brad Hudspeth; Christopher Fleace; Zion Redington; Mason Symons	Canada (CAN); Rio Kanda Kovac; Travis Murao; Byron Green; Mike Whitehead; Cody Caldwell; Trevor Hirschfield; Patrice Dagenais; Patrice Simard; Anthony Létourneau; Matthew Debly; Zak Madell; Eric Furtado Rodrigues	Brazil (BRA); Gilson Wirzma; Lucas Junqueira; Davidson Alves; Gabriel Simplicio; Alexandre Taniguchi; Thalys Juca; Gabriel Feitosa; Rafael Hoffmann; Bruno Damaceno; Daniel Gonçalves; Júlio Cezar Braz; Alexandre Giuriato

== Team roster ==
Argentina; Juan Manuel Herrera; Facundo Costanzo; Matias Cardozo; Mauro Castro; Rodrigo Zambrano; Gustavo Santoro; Roberto Fernandez; Mariano Gastaldi; Fernando Gomez; Juan Cruz Bandini; Lautaro Giovannini; Joselino Gomez	Brazil; Gilson Wirzma; Lucas Junqueira; Davidson Alves; Gabriel Simplicio; Alexandre Taniguchi; Thalys Juca; Gabriel Feitosa; Rafael Hoffmann; Bruno Damaceno; Daniel Gonçalves; Júlio Cezar Braz; Alexandre Giuriato	Canada; Rio Kanda Kovac; Travis Murao; Byron Green; Mike Whitehead; Cody Caldwell; Trevor Hirschfield; Patrice Dagenais; Patrice Simard; Anthony Létourneau; Matthew Debly; Zak Madell; Eric Furtado Rodrigues
Chile; Jeny Barraza; Jonathan Flores; Ariel Figueroa; Jonatan Alarcon; Luciano Benítez; Alexis Barraza; Piero Arévalo; Miguel Ángel Riquelme; Cristopher Flores; Juan Alberto Rodriguez; Christian Madariaga; Diego Alonso Romero	Colombia; Yeny Paola Martinez; Jhon Orozco; Carlos Neme; Disledy Gonzalez; Cristian Amaya; Uriel Rodriguez; Julian Vargas; Manuel Mongua; Ledis Hernandez; David Garcia; Edgar Vanegas; Christian Ordoñez	United States; Travis Baker; Chuck Aoki; Jeff Butler; Sarah Adam; Eric Newby; Lee Fredette; Joshua O'Neill; Clayton Brackett; Bradley Hudspeth; Christopher Fleace; Zion Redington; Mason Symons

== Statistics ==
=== Ranking ===
Rank	Team
Gold medal	United States
Silver medal	Canada
Bronze medal	Brazil
4.	Colombia
5.	Argentina
6.	Chile

== See also ==
- Rugby sevens at the 2023 Pan American Games
- Wheelchair rugby at the 2024 Summer Paralympics
