= Anthony Bouchard (athlete) =

Canadian para athlete (born 1992)

Personal information
- Nationality: Canadian
- Born: 4 November 1992 (age 33) Quebec City, Canada

Sport
- Sport: Wheelchair racing
- Disability class: T52
- Event(s): 100 metres, 400 metres
- Club: Club d'athlétisme de l'Université Laval
- Coached by: Nathalie Seguin
Medal record
Men's para-athletics
Representing Canada
World Championships
Gold medal – first place	2025 New Delhi	100 m T52
Parapan American Games
Gold medal – first place	2023 Santiago	100 m T52
Bronze medal – third place	2023 Santiago	400 m T52

Anthony Bouchard (born 4 November 1992) is a Canadian wheelchair racer who competes in T52 sprint events. He represented Canada at the 2024 Summer Paralympics.

== Career ==
Bouchard competed at the 2023 Parapan American Games and won a gold medal in the 100 metres T52 event with a season best time of 17.67 seconds, and a bronze medal in the 400 metres T52 event with a season best time of 1:03.15. He represented Canada at the 2024 Summer Paralympics and finished in fourth place in the 100 metres T52 event, and in sixth place in the 400 metres T52 event.

In May 2025, he competed at the World Para Athletics Grand Prix in Nottwil, Switzerland, and set a Canadian record time of 16.94 seconds in the 100 metres T52 event, surpassing the previous record of 17.01 seconds set by Andre Beaudoin in 1998. He competed at the 2025 World Para Athletics Championships in the 100 metres T52 event. During the heats he set a championship record with a time of 16.78 seconds. During the final he won a gold medal with a time of 16.95 seconds.

== Personal life ==
Bouchard was involved in a car accident in 2011 when he hit a moose in Laurentides Park.
