= Rodrigo Romero (boccia) =

Argentine Paralympic boccia player

Personal information
- Full name: Rodrigo Nahuel Romero
- Born: 20 November 1998 (age 27)

Sport
- Country: Argentina
- Sport: Boccia
- Disability class: BC3
Medal record
Men's boccia
Representing Argentina
Paralympic Games
Bronze medal – third place	2024 Paris	Pairs BC3
Parapan American Games
Gold medal – first place	2023 Santiago	Pairs BC3
Silver medal – second place	2023 Santiago	Individual BC3

Rodrigo Nahuel Romero (born 20 November 1998) is an Argentine boccia player. He is a two-time medalist at the Parapan American Games and a bronze medalist at the Summer Paralympics.

== Early life ==
Rodrigo Nahuel Romero was born on 20 November 1998. On 3 November 2019, Romero suffered a spinal cord injury in a horse riding accident. Two years later, on the exact same date, while recuperating from his injury, he was introduced to boccia by Cristian Rosado.

== Career ==
Romero competed in two events at the 2023 Parapan American Games, winning the silver medal in the individual BC3 event and the gold medal in the pairs BC3 event, having been paired with Stefanía Ferrando in the latter.

Romero represented Argentina at two events the 2024 Summer Paralympics. In the men's BC3 event, he was place in Pool B where he finished in third place, failing to qualify for the quarterfinals. Ferrando and Romero also competed in the pairs BC3 event, where they won the bronze medal.
