= Nathan Clement =

Canadian Para-cyclist

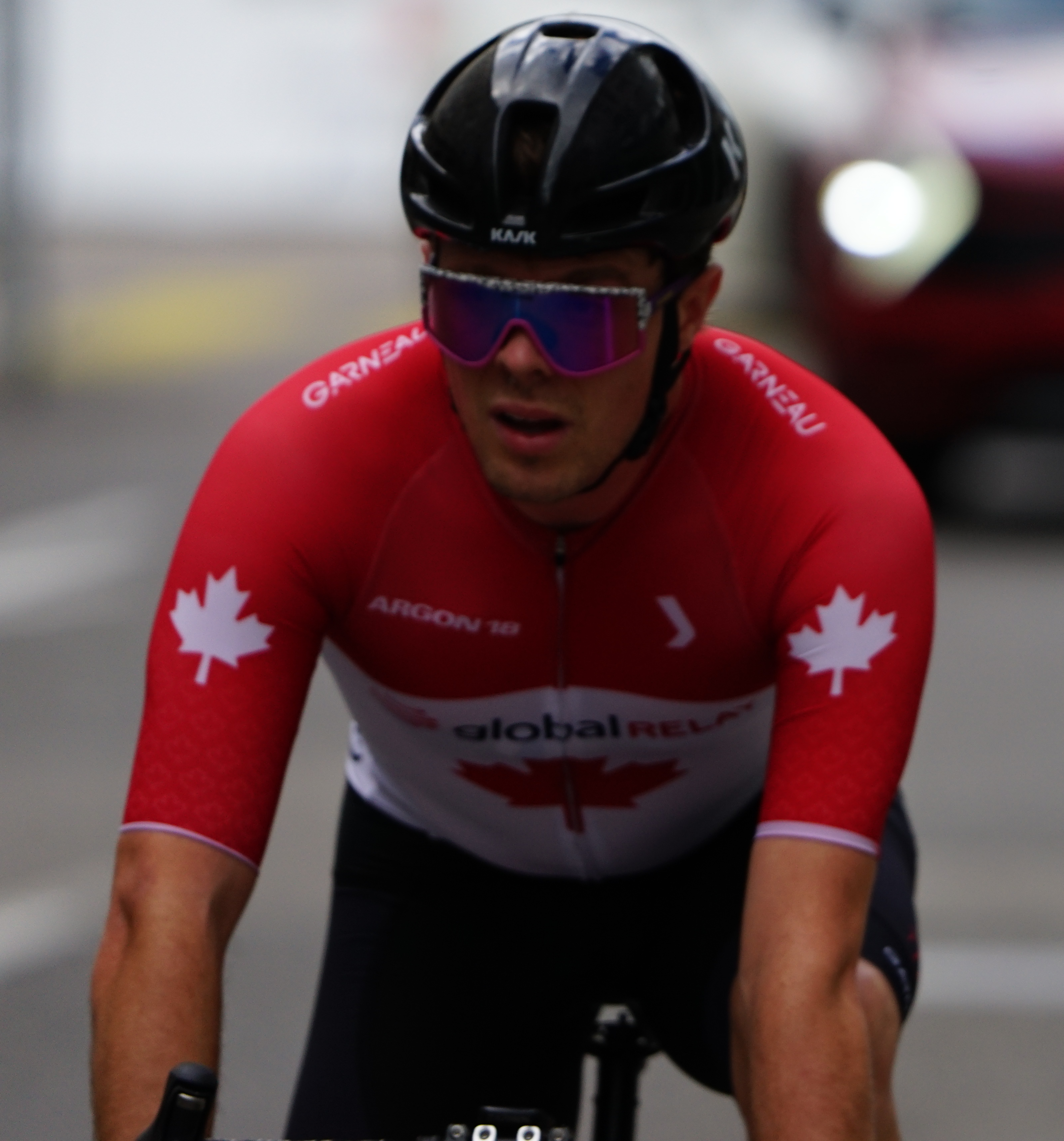
- Clement during the 2024 World Championships

Personal information
- Nationality: Canadian
- Born: 30 September 1994 (age 31) North Vancouver, British Columbia

Sport
- Sport: Para-cycling
- Disability class: T1
Medal record
Men's para-cycling
Representing Canada
Paralympic Games
Silver medal – second place	2024 Paris	Road time trial T1–2
Road World Championships
Gold medal – first place	2024 Zurich	Time trial T1
Gold medal – first place	2024 Zurich	Road race T1
Gold medal – first place	2023 Glasgow	Time trial T1
Silver medal – second place	2022 Baie-Comeau	Time trial T1
Silver medal – second place	2022 Baie-Comeau	Road race T1
Bronze medal – third place	2023 Glasgow	Road race T1
Parapan American Games
Gold medal – first place	2023 Santiago	Mixed time trial T1–2
Bronze medal – third place	2023 Santiago	Road race T1–2

Nathan Clement (born 30 September 1994) is a Canadian para-cyclist and para-swimmer.

== Early life and education ==
Nathan Clement had a stroke at age two which caused him to lose mobility on one side of his body. His parents are both high-level athletes. Clement studied broadcast and online journalism at the British Columbia Institute of Technology. He is currently a writer and editor for Evergreen Productions. He is also a co-host of the AMI podcast, 'Para Sport Nation'.

== Career ==
In September 2024, Clement represented Canada at the 2024 Summer Paralympics and won a silver medal in the road time trial T1–2 event. Weeks later, he competed at the 2024 UCI Para-cycling Road World Championships and won gold medals in the time trial and road race T1 events.
