= Ruby Stevens =

Canadian para swimmer

Personal information
- Born: September 7, 2002 (age 23) Scarborough, Ontario, Canada

Sport
- Disability class: S6
- Coached by: Vicky Keith

Achievements and titles
- World finals: 2023 Parapan American Games: S6 100-metre backstroke; Gold
Medal record
Para swimming
Representing Canada
Parapan American Games
Gold medal – first place	2023 Santiago	100m backstroke S6

Ruby Stevens (born September 7, 2002) is a Canadian para swimmer born with complicated hereditary spastic paraplegia and generalized dystonia. She won gold in the women's S6 100-metre backstroke at the 2023 Parapan American Games setting a new Parapan American Games record in the event.

== Early life and education ==
Stevens is diagnosed with Asperger syndrome, attention deficit hyperactivity disorder, and generalized anxiety disorder, as well as having seizures due to epilepsy. She began synchronized swimming at age 2.

== Career ==
Stevens competed in synchronized swimming for the Variety Village Synchro Club and represented Canada in synchronized swimming at an international competition in Taiwan in 2015.

Stevens won the B Final in the women's multi class 100 breaststroke at the Para Swimming World Series in Guadalajara, Mexico, her first international competition. She competed at the 2023 Parapan American Games in Santiago, Chile and won gold in the women's S6 100-metre backstroke. She won Canada's first gold at the Games and set a Games record at 1:30.41.
