= Lance Cryderman =

Canadian boccia player (born 1980)

Personal information
- Born: November 17, 1980 (age 45) Greater Sudbury, Ontario, Canada

Sport
- Country: Canada
- Sport: Boccia
- Disability: Cerebral palsy
- Disability class: BC1
Medal record
Boccia
Representing Canada
Parapan American Games
Silver medal – second place	2023 Santiago	Individual BC1
Silver medal – second place	2023 Santiago	Team BC1-BC2

Lance Cryderman (born November 17, 1980) is a Canadian boccia player.

== Early life ==
Cryderman was born November 17, 1980, and is from Greater Sudbury, Ontario. He attended Lockerby Composite School. He has an undergraduate degree in psychology and a master's degree in business administration from Laurentian University.

== Career ==
Cryderman started playing boccia at the age of 12 when he joined the Sudbury Shooting Stars, a boccia club. He is a member of the BC1 class. Cryderman participated at the 2000 Summer Paralympics, but was knocked in group play. Following the 2000 Paralympics, he retired from the sport in 2001 to finish his master's degree. He returned to boccia in 2017 after watching a webcast of the Canadian Boccia Championships. He went on to earn silver medals at the 2018, 2019, and 2021 championships. He also reached the round of 16 at the 2022 World Boccia Championship and won two silver metals at the 2023 Parapan American Games: one at the team competition and another in the individual event. Before returning to the 2024 Summer Paralympics, he was ranked the eleventh best male athlete for BC1 in the world. At the 2024 Summer Paralympics, he was placed in Pool D against Andre Ramos and John Loung, ranked fourth and sixth in the world respectively. Cryderman lost both matches and was eliminated from group play.

== Personal life ==
According to the Canadian Paralympic Committee, Cryderman lives in Val Caron, Greater Sudbury, Ontario. He works as an accessibility advisor at Laurentian University. Following his return, he relaunched the Sudbury Shooting Stars, which had ceased shortly after Cryderman retired due to a lack of volunteers. He also launched a boccia program for young children named "Boccia Bratz".
