= Michael Sametz =

Canadian road cyclist (born 1996)

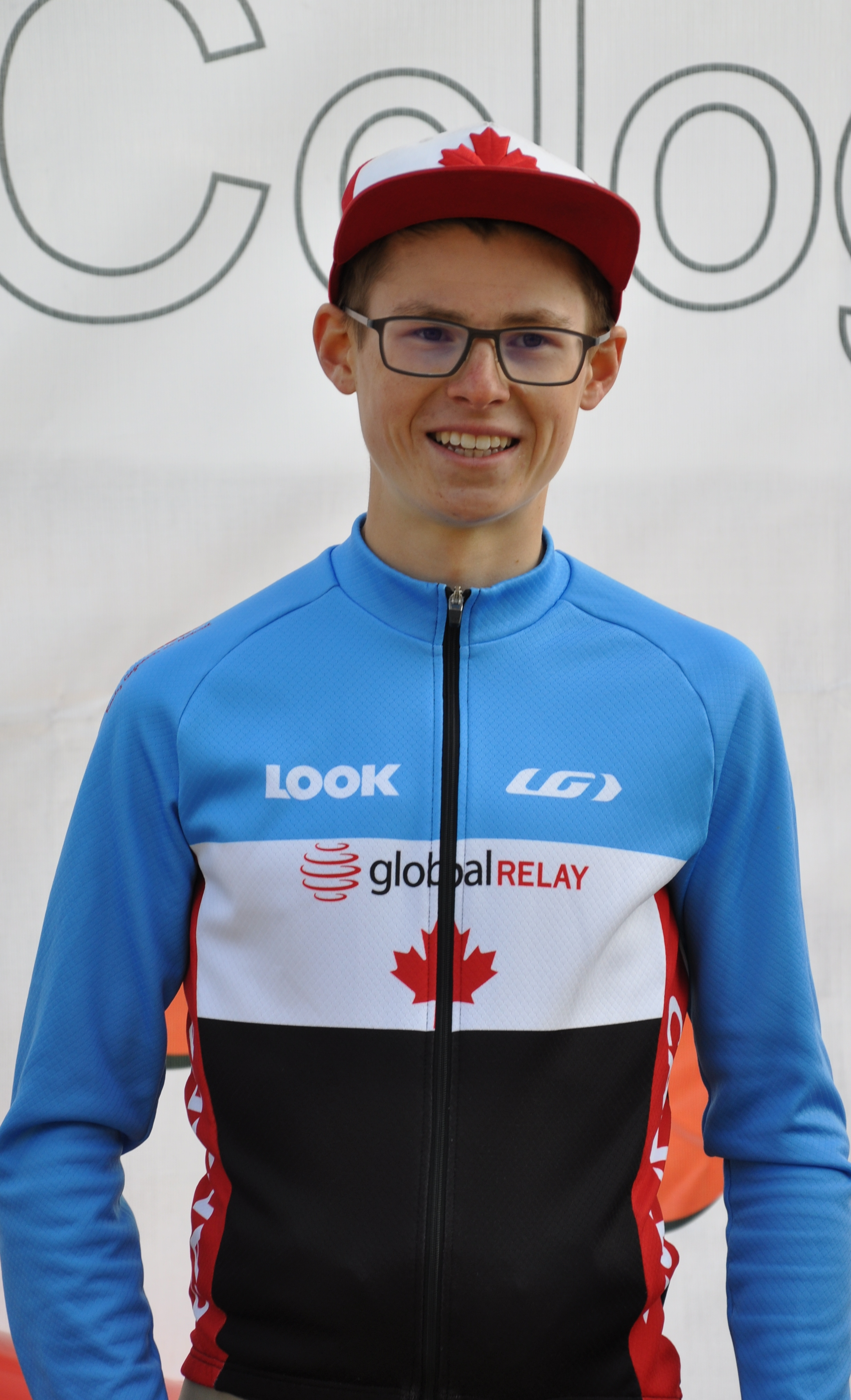
- Michael Sametz in 2019

Personal information
- Born: May 21, 1996 (age 30) Calgary, Alberta, Canada
- Education: University of Calgary

Sport
- Country: Canada
- Sport: Track and road cycling
- Disability class: C3
Medal record
Representing Canada
Men's Para-cycling
Summer Paralympics
Bronze medal – third place	2016 Rio de Janeiro	Road time trial C3
Parapan American Games
Silver medal – second place	2015 Toronto	Individual pursuit C1-3
Bronze medal – third place	2023 Santiago	Time trial C1-5
Bronze medal – third place	2023 Santiago	Individual pursuit C1-3
Road World Championships
Gold medal – first place	2017 Pietermaritzburg	Time trial C3
Bronze medal – third place	2023 Glasgow	Time trial C3

Michael Sametz (born May 21, 1996) is a Canadian road racing para cyclist who competes in the C3 classification. He won a bronze medal for Team Canada at the 2016 Summer Paralympics – Men's road time trial C3.

== Early life ==
Sametz was born on May 21, 1996, in Calgary, Alberta, to mother Ronda. After suffering a stroke in the womb, he was born with right hemiplegic cerebral palsy. While attending Springbank Community High School, Sametz participated in Alberta Schools' Athletic Association sponsored cross country, golf, and badminton. He began cycling at age 12 when he was looking to try a new sport and turned to competitive road and track cycling in 2014. After graduating from high school, Sametz attended the University of Calgary as a business student with the intention of majoring in accounting.

== Career ==
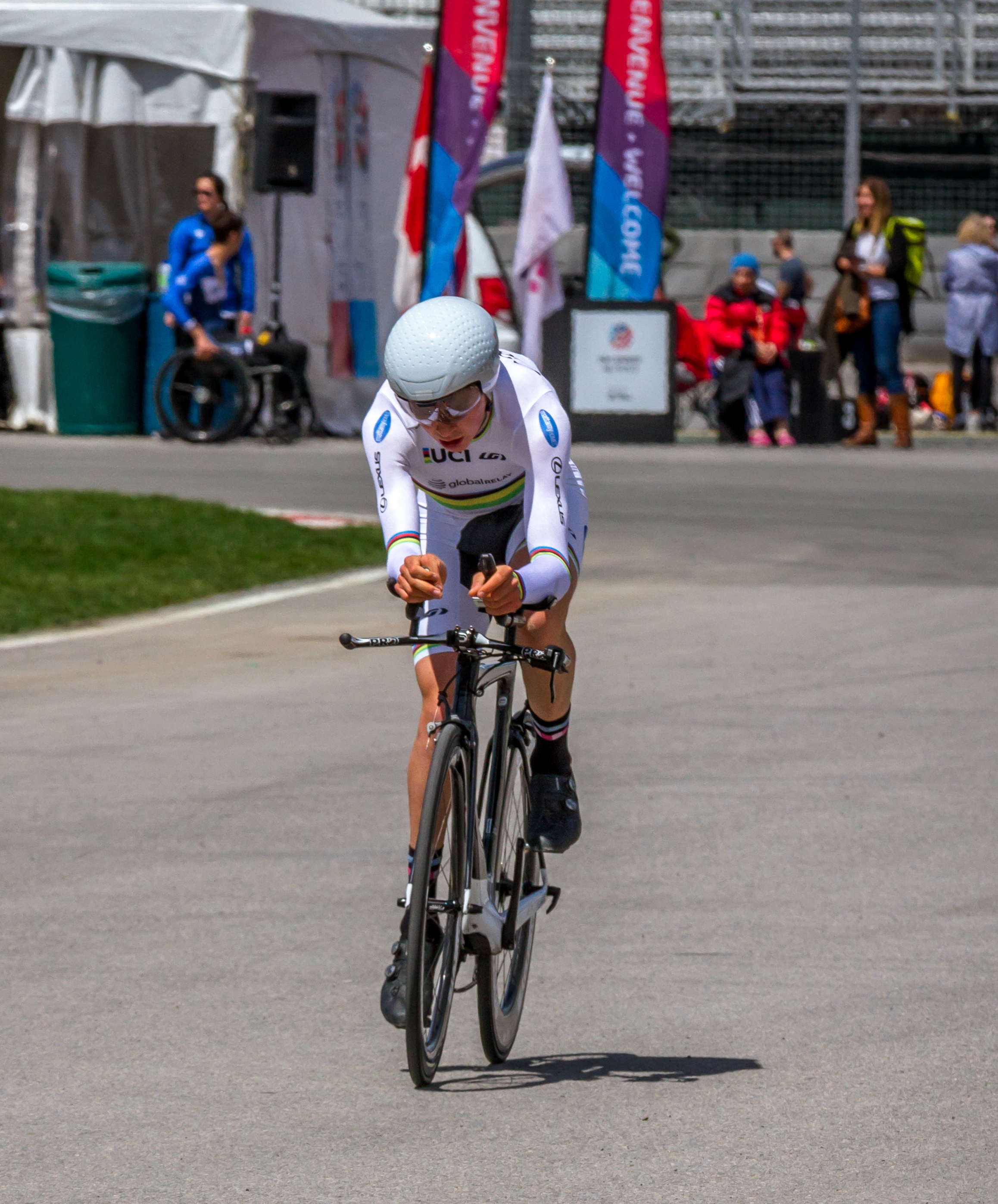
Sametz competing in the Longhi Challenge, para cycling time trial

A year after turning to competitive road and track cycling, Sametz won two gold medals at the Global Relay Canadian 2015 Road Cycling national championships. He subsequently qualified for the 2015 Parapan American Games where he won a silver medal in the men's individual pursuit Cl-3 final. In 2016, at the age of 20, Sametz was named to Team Canada's 2016 Summer Paralympics team. In his Paralympic Games debut as the youngest member of the Canadian para-cycling team, Sametz won a bronze medal in the Road time trial C3. He was subsequently honoured by Calgary mayor Naheed Nenshi upon his return.

Following his Paralympic debut, Sametz won a gold medal at the 2017 UCI Para-cycling Road World Championships by beating silver medalist Sergey Ustinov in the C3 Track time trial. He returned to the championships the following year and obtained a world championship title in the time trial. Prior to the trial, Sametz chose to use a bigger gear on his bike to gain speed on the descents.

In 2020, Sametz was named to Canada's Paralympic Team prior to the delayed 2020 Summer Paralympics.
