= Cycling at the 2023 Parapan American Games =

Cycling competitions at the 2023 Parapan American Games

- Cycling pictograms
- Venue: Circuito San Miguel (road); Velódromo Peñalolén (track)
- Dates: 19 – 26 November 2023
- No. of events: 26 (12 men, 12 women, 2 mixed)
- Competitors: 79 from 17 nations

Cycling competitions at the 2023 Parapan American Games in Santiago, Chile were held between 19 and 25 November 2023 at two venues across Santiago. The Streets of Isla de Maipo and Santiago were held the road competitions, while the velodrome were held the track cycling competitions.

26 medal events were contested, 16 in road cycling and ten in track cycling. Each discipline is gender neutral in terms of events.

== Participating nations ==
There are 79 cyclists from 17 nations participating.

- Argentina (10)
- Brazil (14)
- Canada (7)
- Chile (6) (Host)
- Colombia (9)
- Costa Rica (2)
- Cuba (2)
- Dominican Republic (2)
- Grenada (1)
- Mexico (5)
- Panama (2)
- Paraguay (1)
- Peru (2)
- United States (11)
- Uruguay (1)
- Venezuela (3)
- Virgin Islands (1)

== Medal table ==
* Host nation (Chile)

Rank	NPC	Gold	Silver	Bronze	Total
1	United States (USA)	9	7	4	20
2	Colombia (COL)	6	7	8	21
3	Brazil (BRA)	5	3	2	10
4	Canada (CAN)	4	3	5	12
5	Argentina (ARG)	2	6	4	12
6	Chile (CHI)*	0	0	2	2
7	Dominican Republic (DOM)	0	0	1	1
Totals (7 entries)		26	26	26	78

== Medalists ==
=== Road cycling ===
==== Men's events ====
Event	Class	Gold	Silver	Bronze
Time trial	B	Maximiliano Gómez; Guide: Sebastián Tolosa; Argentina	Nelson Serna; Guide: Marvin Angarita; Colombia	Matías Mansilla; Guide: Marcelo Mansilla; Chile
Time trial	C1–5	Alexandre Hayward; Canada	Lauro Chaman; Brazil	Michael Sametz; Canada
Time trial	H1–5	Eric Ryan Pinney; United States	Brandon Lyons; United States	Charles Moreau; Canada
Road race	B	Maximiliano Gómez; Guide: Sebastián Tolosa; Argentina	Nelson Serna; Guide: Marvin Angarita; Colombia	Matías Mansilla; Guide: Marcelo Mansilla; Chile
Road race	C1–3	Alejandro Perea; Colombia	Alexandre Hayward; Canada	Esneider Muñoz Marin; Colombia
Road race	C4–5	Carlos Vargas; Colombia	Lauro Chaman; Brazil	José Frank Rodriguez; Dominican Republic
Road race	H3–5	Alfredo de los Santos; United States	Eric Ryan Pinney; United States	Brandon Lyons; United States

==== Women's events ====
Event	Class	Gold	Silver	Bronze
Time trial	B	Bianca Garcia; Guide: Nicolle Borges; Brazil	María José Quiroga; Guide: Micaela Barroso; Argentina	María Agustina Cruceño; Guide: Mayra Tocha; Argentina
Time trial	C1–5	Samantha Bosco; United States	Jamie Whitmore; United States	Daniela Munévar; Colombia
Time trial	H1–5	Katerina Brim; United States	Jady Malavazzi; Brazil	Jenna Rollman; United States
Road race	B	Bianca Garcia; Guide: Nicolle Borges; Brazil	María Agustina Cruceño; Guide: Mayra Tocha; Argentina	María José Quiroga; Guide: Micaela Barroso; Argentina
Road race	C1–3	Daniela Munévar; Colombia	Jamie Whitmore; United States	Paula Caballeros; Colombia
Road race	C4–5	Paula Ossa; Colombia	Mariela Delgado; Argentina	Samantha Bosco; United States
Road race	H2–5	Jady Malavazzi; Brazil	Katerina Brim; United States	Jenna Rollman; United States

==== Mixed events ====
Event	Class	Gold	Silver	Bronze
Time trial	T1–2	Nathan Clement; Canada	Dennis Connors; United States	Juan José Betancourt; Colombia
Road race	T1–2	Dennis Connors; United States	Juan José Betancourt; Colombia	Nathan Clement; Canada

=== Track cycling ===
==== Men's events ====
Event	Class	Gold	Silver	Bronze
Time trial	B	Michael Stephens; Guide: Joseph Christiansen; United States	Nelson Serna; Guide: Marvin Angarita; Colombia	Maximiliano Gómez; Guide: Sebastián Tolosa; Argentina
Time trial	C1–5	Edwin Fabián Mátiz Ruiz; Colombia	Carlos Vargas; Colombia	Alexandre Hayward; Canada
Pursuit	B	Nelson Serna; Guide: Marvin Angarita; Colombia	Maximiliano Gómez; Guide: Sebastián Tolosa; Argentina	Raúl Cesar Villalba; Guide: Ezequiel Romero; Argentina
Pursuit	C1–3	Alexandre Hayward; Canada	Alejandro Perea; Colombia	Michael Sametz; Canada
Pursuit	C4–5	Lauro Chaman; Brazil	Carlos Vargas; Colombia	Edwin Fabián Mátiz Ruiz; Colombia

==== Women's events ====
Event	Class	Gold	Silver	Bronze
Time trial	B	Hannah Chadwick-Dias; Guide: Skyler Espinoza; United States	María José Quiroga; Guide: Micaela Barroso; Argentina	Bianca Garcia; Guide: Nicolle Borges; Brazil
Time trial	C1–5	Sabrina Custódia; Brazil	Melissa Pemble-Chubb-Higgins; Canada	Paula Ossa; Colombia
Pursuit	B	Hannah Chadwick-Dias; Guide: Skyler Espinoza; United States	María José Quiroga; Guide: Micaela Barroso; Argentina	Bianca Garcia; Guide: Nicolle Borges; Brazil
Pursuit	C1–3	Melissa Pemble-Chubb-Higgins; Canada	Jamie Whitmore; United States	Paula Caballeros; Colombia
Pursuit	C4–5	Samantha Bosco; United States	Keely Shaw; Canada	Paula Ossa; Colombia

== See also ==
- Cycling at the 2023 Pan American Games
- Cycling at the 2024 Summer Paralympics
