= Alexandre Hayward =

Canadian cyclist (born 1997)

Personal information
- Born: March 4, 1997 (age 29) Campbellton, New Brunswick

Sport
- Country: Canada
- Sport: Para Cycling
Medal record
Representing Canada
Men's para-cycling
Paralympic Games
Bronze medal – third place	2024 Paris	Pursuit C3
Road World Championships
Gold medal – first place	2025 Ronse	Time trial C3
Bronze medal – third place	2024 Zurich	Time trial C3
Bronze medal – third place	2024 Zurich	Road race C3
Bronze medal – third place	2025 Ronse	Road race C3
Track World Championships
Bronze medal – third place	2026 Apeldoorn	Elimination C3
Parapan American Games
Gold medal – first place	2023 Santiago	C1-5 Individual Time Trial
Gold medal – first place	2023 Santiago	C1-3 3000m Individual Pursuit
Silver medal – second place	2023 Santiago	C1-3 Road Race
Bronze medal – third place	2023 Santiago	C1-5 1000m Individual Time Trial

Alexandre Hayward (born March 4, 1997) is a Canadian cyclist. He represented Canada at the 2023 Parapan American Games, winning medals in both track and road events.

== Early life and education ==
Hayward was born on March 4, 1997 in Campbellton, New Brunswick. He graduated from the University of New Brunswick with a degree in mechanical engineering in 2023.

== Athletic career ==
In 2012, Hayward suffered a spinal injury while playing ice hockey. He began playing wheelchair basketball and represented Team New Brunswick at the Canada Games in 2015 and 2019.

He began cycling during the COVID-19 pandemic. He represented Canada at the 2023 Parapan American Games, winning medals in both track and road events. He also represented Canada during the 2024 Summer Paralympics, winning bronze in the 3,000-metre pursuit.
