= Boccia at the 2023 Parapan American Games =

Boccia competitions at the 2023 Parapan American Games

- Boccia pictogram
- Venue: Centro Deportivo Comunitario de Lo Espejo
- Dates: 19 – 25 November 2023
- No. of events: 11 (4 men, 4 women, 3 mixed)
- Competitors: 64 from 15 nations

Boccia competitions at the 2023 Parapan American Games in Santiago, Chile were held between 19 and 25 November 2023 at the Centro Deportivo Comunitario, in the commune of Lo Espejo.

The winners of the mixed events earned a qualification spot for the 2024 Summer Paralympics.

== Participating nations ==
There are 64 players from 15 nations participating.

- Argentina (7)
- Bermuda (2)
- Brazil (10)
- Canada (8)
- Chile (7) (Host)
- Colombia (6)
- Ecuador (3)
- El Salvador (2)
- Guatemala (2)
- Mexico (6)
- Panama (1)
- Peru (5)
- United States (3)
- Uruguay (1)
- Venezuela (1)

== Medal summary ==
=== Medal table ===
* Host nation (Chile)

Rank	NPC	Gold	Silver	Bronze	Total
1	Brazil (BRA)	5	0	2	7
2	Canada (CAN)	2	3	1	6
3	Mexico (MEX)	2	0	2	4
4	Colombia (COL)	1	3	1	5
5	Argentina (ARG)	1	2	3	6
6	Peru (PER)	0	1	1	2
7	Bermuda (BER)	0	1	0	1
7	El Salvador (ESA)	0	1	0	1
9	Ecuador (ECU)	0	0	1	1
Totals (9 entries)		11	11	11	33

=== Medalists ===
==== Individual events ====
Event	Class	Gold	Silver	Bronze
Men's individual	BC1	Eduardo Sanchez; Mexico	Lance Cryderman; Canada	José Carlos Chagas; Brazil
Men's individual	BC2	Maciel Santos; Brazil	Danik Allard; Canada	Luis Cristaldo; Argentina
Men's individual	BC3	Mateus Carvalho; Brazil	Rodrigo Romero; Argentina	Jesús Romero; Colombia
Men's individual	BC4	Edilson Chica; Colombia	Euclides Grisales; Colombia	Iulian Ciobanu; Canada
Women's individual	BC1	Andreza de Oliveira; Brazil	Yushae Desilva-Andrade; Bermuda	Ailén Flores; Argentina
Women's individual	BC2	Karina Martinez; Mexico	Rebeca Duarte; El Salvador	Joselyn León; Ecuador
Women's individual	BC3	Evelyn de Oliveira; Brazil	Stefanía Ferrando; Argentina	Niurka Callupe; Peru
Women's individual	BC4	Alison Levine; Canada	Leidy Chica; Colombia	Karla Manuel; Mexico

==== Pairs and teams events ====
Event	Class	Gold	Silver	Bronze
Mixed team	BC1–BC2	Brazil; Andreza de Oliveira; Iuri Tauan Silva; Maciel Santos	Canada; Kristyn Collins; Danik Allard; Lance Cryderman	Argentina; Ailén Flores; Jonatan Aquino; Luis Cristaldo
Mixed pairs	BC3	Argentina; Stefanía Ferrando; Rodrigo Romero	Peru; Niurka Callupe; Dean Acosta	Brazil; Evelyn de Oliveira; Mateus Carvalho
Mixed pairs	BC4	Canada; Alison Levine; Iulian Ciabanu	Colombia; Leidy Chica; Edilson Chica	Mexico; Karla Manuel; Edgar Mora

== See also ==
- Boccia at the 2024 Summer Paralympics
