= Costa Rica at the 2023 Parapan American Games =

- Flag of Costa Rica
- IPC code: CRC
- NPC: Costa Rica Paralympic Committee
- Website: www.paralympic.org/costa-rica

in Santiago, Chile 17 November 2023 – 26 November 2023
- Competitors: 29 in 8 sports
- Flag bearers: Sherman Guity; Camila Haase
- Medals Ranked 12th: Gold 4 Silver 5 Bronze 3 Total 12

Parapan American Games appearances
- 1999; 2003; 2007; 2011; 2015; 2019; 2023

Costa Rica competed in the 2023 Parapan American Games in Santiago, Chile from 17 November to 26 November 2023. This was Costa Rica's seventh appearance at the Parapan American Games, having competed at every edition of the games since the inaugural edition in 1999.

Paralympic athlete Sherman Guity and para swimmer Camila Haase were the country's flagbearers during the opening ceremony.

== Medalists ==
The following Costa Rican competitors won medals at the games. In the by discipline sections below, medalists' names are bolded.

Medal	Name	Sport	Event	Date
Gold	Sherman Guity	Athletics	Men's 100 metres T64	November 18
Gold	Sherman Guity	Athletics	Men's 200 metres T64	November 19
Gold	Andrés Molina	Taekwondo	Men's 80 kg	November 19
Gold	Pilar Riveros	Archery	Women's individual compound open	November 22
Silver	Steven Roman	Table tennis	Men's individual C8	November 18
Silver	Paola Arana	Shooting	P2 Women's 10 metre air pistol SH1	November 19
Silver	Diego Quesada	Archery	Men's individual compound open	November 22
Silver	Camila Haase	Swimming	Women's 100 metre breaststroke SB8	November 24
Silver	Melissa Calvo	Athletics	Women's 400 metres T13	November 25
Bronze	Aneth Araya	Table tennis	Women's individual C8	November 18
Bronze	Camila Haase	Swimming	Women's 200 metre individual medley SM9	November 19
Bronze	Domingo Arguello; Steven Roman	Table tennis	Men's doubles C14	November 20

Medals by sport/discipline
Sport	1st place, gold medalist(s)	2nd place, silver medalist(s)	3rd place, bronze medalist(s)	Total
Athletics	2	1	0	**3**
Archery	1	1	0	**2**
Taekwondo	1	0	0	**1**
Table tennis	0	1	2	**3**
Swimming	0	1	1	**2**
Shooting	0	1	0	**1**
**Total**	**4**	**5**	**3**	**12**

Medals by day
Day	1st place, gold medalist(s)	2nd place, silver medalist(s)	3rd place, bronze medalist(s)	Total
18 November	1	1	1	3
19 November	2	1	1	4
20 November	0	0	1	1
21 November	0	0	0	0
22 November	1	1	0	2
23 November	0	0	0	0
24 November	0	1	0	1
25 November	0	1	0	1
26 November	0	0	0	0
**Total**	**4**	**5**	**3**	**12**

Medals by gender
**Gender**	1st place, gold medalist(s)	2nd place, silver medalist(s)	3rd place, bronze medalist(s)	**Total**
Male	3	2	1	6
Female	1	3	2	6
Mixed	0	0	0	0
**Total**	**4**	**5**	**3**	**12**

== Competitors ==
The following is the list of number of competitors (per gender) participating at the games per sport/discipline.

Sport	Men	Women	Total
Archery	1	1	2
Athletics	5	2	7
Cycling	2	0	2
Shooting	0	1	1
Swimming	2	2	4
Taekwondo	1	0	1
Table tennis	5	3	8
Wheelchair tennis	2	2	4
Total	18	11	29

== Archery ==
Men

Athlete	Event	Ranking Round		Round of 16	Quarterfinals	Semifinals	Final / BM	
Athlete	Event	Score	Seed	Opposition Score	Opposition Score	Opposition Score	Opposition Score	Rank
Diego Quesada	Individual compound open	676	3	Bye	Castro (BRA); W 153–153	Tremblay (CAN); W 153–152	Polish (USA); L 142–145	2nd place, silver medalist(s)

Women

Athlete	Event	Ranking Round		Round of 16	Quarterfinals	Semifinals	Final / BM	
Athlete	Event	Score	Seed	Opposition Score	Opposition Score	Opposition Score	Opposition Score	Rank
Pilar Riveros	Individual compound open	659	2	Bye	Candia (CHI); W 139–116	Peñaranda (COL); W 134–126	Zúñiga (CHI); W 139–138	1st place, gold medalist(s)

Mixed

Athlete	Event	Ranking Round		Quarterfinals	Semifinals	Final / BM	
Athlete	Event	Score	Seed	Opposition Score	Opposition Score	Opposition Score	Rank
Diego Quesada; Pilar Riveros	Team compound open	1335	2	Ecuador; L 143–147	Did not advance		

== Athletics ==
Key

- Note–Ranks given for track events are within the athlete's heat only
- Q = Qualified for the next round
- q = Qualified for the next round as a fastest loser
- N/A = Round not applicable for the event
- Bye = Athlete not required to compete in round

Men

Track events

Athlete	Event	Semifinal		Final	
Athlete	Event	Result	Rank	Result	Rank
Laurens Molina	100 m T54	16.03	5	Did not advance	
Laurens Molina	400 m T54	DSQ		Did not advance	
Sherman Guity	100 m T64	—N/a		10.89	1st place, gold medalist(s)
Sherman Guity	200 m T64	—N/a		21.59	1st place, gold medalist(s)
Kermyth Forbes	400 m T20	53.68	6	Did not advance	

Field events

Athlete	Event	Final	
Athlete	Event	Distance	Position
Kermyth Forbes	Long jump T20	5.12	6
Nardy De Jesus Alvarez	Shot put F11	7.77	9
Nardy De Jesus Alvarez	Discus throw F11	22.84	8
Silier Gonzalez	Shot put F63	9.28	4

Women

Track events

Athlete	Event	Semifinal		Final	
Athlete	Event	Result	Rank	Result	Rank
Melissa Calvo	100 m T13	—N/a		13.55	4
Melissa Calvo	400 m T13	—N/a		1:04.41	2nd place, silver medalist(s)
Argeri Sophia Orozco	100 m T38	15.78	4 q	16.03	8
Argeri Sophia Orozco	400 m T38	1:16.83	4 q	1:20.28	6

Universal

Track events

Athlete	Event	Semifinal		Final	
Athlete	Event	Result	Rank	Result	Rank
Sherman Guity; Laurens Molina; Melissa Calvo; Argeri Sophia Orozco	4 × 100 m relay	DNS		Did not advance	

== Cycling ==
=== Road ===
Men

Athlete	Event	Result	Rank
Henry Raabe	Time trial C1–5	29:24.53	10
Henry Raabe	Road race C1–3	1:21:31	4
Leonel Solis	Time trial C1–5	32:07.03	21
Leonel Solis	Road race C4–5	–1 LAP	12

== Shooting ==
Women

Athlete	Event	Qualification		Final	
Athlete	Event	Score	Rank	Score	Rank
Paola Arana	P2 – 10 m air pistol SH1	524	3 Q	222.1	2nd place, silver medalist(s)

== Swimming ==
Men

Athlete	Event	Heat		Final	
Athlete	Event	Time	Rank	Time	Rank
Neythan Alfaro	50 m freestyle S9	31.85	13	Did not advance	
Neythan Alfaro	100 m backstroke S9	1:22.75	12	Did not advance	
Neythan Alfaro	100 m breaststroke SB8	DSQ		Did not advance	
Esteban Zamora	50 m freestyle S9	29.94	10	Did not advance	
Esteban Zamora	100 m breaststroke SB9	1:46.61	11	Did not advance	
Esteban Zamora	100 m butterfly S9	1:24.26	11	Did not advance	

Women

Athlete	Event	Heat		Final	
Athlete	Event	Time	Rank	Time	Rank
Sara Miranda	100 m freestyle S7	1:24.13	7 Q	1:23.46	7
Sara Miranda	400 m freestyle S8	—N/a		6:17.50	6
Sara Miranda	100 m backstroke S7	—N/a		1:38.62	4
Sara Miranda	50 m butterfly S7	—N/a		50.45	5
Camila Haase	100 m freestyle S9	1:14.69	10	Did not advance	
Camila Haase	400 m freestyle S9	6:10.13	10	Did not advance	
Camila Haase	100 m backstroke S9	—N/a		1:23.17	5
Camila Haase	100 m breaststroke SB8	—N/a		1:36.84	2nd place, silver medalist(s)
Camila Haase	200 m individual medley SM9	—N/a		3:08.85	3rd place, bronze medalist(s)

Mixed

Athlete	Event	Final	
Athlete	Event	Time	Rank
Neythan Alfaro; Esteban Zamora; Camila Haase; Sara Miranda	4 × 100 m freestyle relay 34pts	4:59.77	6
Neythan Alfaro; Esteban Zamora; Camila Haase; Sara Miranda	4 × 100 m medley relay 34pts	5:43.74	7

== Table tennis ==
Men

Athlete	Event	Preliminaries				Quarterfinals	Semifinals	Final / BM	
Athlete	Event	Opposition Result	Opposition Result	Opposition Result	Rank	Opposition Result	Opposition Result	Opposition Result	Rank
Sebastián Chaves	Singles C4	Rodríguez (CHI); L 0–3	González (MEX); L 0–3	—N/a	3	Did not advance			
Domingo Arguello	Singles C6	Seidenfeld (USA); L 0–3	Prado (PER); W 3–0	Dettoni (CHI); L 0–3	3	Did not advance			
Steven Roman	Singles C8	Preza (MEX); W 3–0	Polo (ECU); W 3–0	—N/a	1 Q	Bye	Pérez (ARG); W 3–1	Manara (BRA); L 0–3	2nd place, silver medalist(s)
Nixon Reyes	Singles C9	Leibovitz (USA); L 0–3	Pavez (CHI); L 1–3	—N/a	3	Did not advance			
José Andrés Vargas	Singles C10	Echaveguren (CHI); L 0–3	Ramírez (COL); L 1–3	—N/a	3	Did not advance			
Domingo Arguello; Steven Roman	Doubles C14	Salmin / Stroh (BRA); L 1–3	Kaniuka / Martinez (ARG); W 3–1	—N/a	2 Q	—N/a	Pino / Torres (CHI); L 0–3	Did not advance	3rd place, bronze medalist(s)

Women

Athlete	Event	Preliminaries				Quarterfinals	Semifinals	Final / BM	
Athlete	Event	Opposition Result	Opposition Result	Opposition Result	Rank	Opposition Result	Opposition Result	Opposition Result	Rank
Fiorella Padilla	Singles C1–3	Severo (BRA); L 0–3	García (VEN); L 0–3	Sigala (MEX); L 0–3	4	Did not advance			
Kristel Morales	Singles C6–7	Perez (MEX); L 0–3	Chan (CAN); L 2–3	—N/a	3	Did not advance			
Aneth Araya	Singles C8	Kelmer (BRA); L 0–3	Rivera (ESA); W 3–0	—N/a	2 Q	—N/a	Pérez (CHI); L 0–3	Did not advance	3rd place, bronze medalist(s)
Aneth Araya; Kristel Morales	Doubles C14–20	Kelmer / Lacerda (BRA); L 1–3	Espinoza / Yevenes (CHI); L 0–3	—N/a	3	Did not advance			

Mixed

Athlete	Event	Round of 16	Quarterfinals	Semifinals	Final / BM	
Athlete	Event	Opposition Result	Opposition Result	Opposition Result	Opposition Result	Rank
Sebastián Chaves; Fiorella Padilla	Doubles C4–7	Reyes / Sigala (MEX); L 0–3	Did not advance			
Steven Roman; Aneth Araya	Doubles C14–17	Bye	Carvalho / Kelmer (BRA); L 0–3	Did not advance		
José Andrés Vargas; Kristel Morales	Doubles C14–17	Pino / Yevenes (CHI); L 1–3	Did not advance			

== Taekwondo ==
Men

Athlete	Event	Quarterfinals	Semifinals	Repechage	Final / BM	
Athlete	Event	Opposition Result	Opposition Result	Opposition Result	Opposition Result	Rank
Andrés Molina	−80 kg	Loonstra (ARU); W 16–5	Lopes (BRA); W 15–7	Bye	Najera (MEX); W 13–8	1st place, gold medalist(s)

== Wheelchair tennis ==
Men

Athlete	Event	Round of 32	Round of 16	Quarterfinals	Semifinals	Final / BM	
Athlete	Event	Opposition Result	Opposition Result	Opposition Result	Opposition Result	Opposition Result	Rank
Steven Enriquez	Singles	Muro (MEX); L 4–6, 3–6	Did not advance				
José Pablo Gil	Singles	Bye	Manzano (ECU); W 6–4, 6–0	Fernandez (ARG); L 1–6, 0–6	Did not advance		
Steven Enriquez; José Pablo Gil	Doubles	—N/a	Oquendo / Sanchez (COL); L 1–6, 2–6	Did not advance			

Women

Athlete	Event	Round of 16	Quarterfinals	Semifinals	Final / BM	
Athlete	Event	Opposition Result	Opposition Result	Opposition Result	Opposition Result	Rank
Adriana Quesada	Singles	Moreno (ARG); L 0–6, 0–6	Did not advance			
Valeria Valverde	Singles	Lanucha (CAN); L 4–6, 5–7	Did not advance			
Adriana Quesada; Valeria Valverde	Doubles	—N/a	Cabrillana / Fuentes (CHI); L 0–6, 0–6	Did not advance		

== See also ==
- Costa Rica at the 2023 Pan American Games
- Costa Rica at the 2024 Summer Paralympics
