= Disability in Costa Rica =

The incidence of disability in Costa Rica is about 10.5% of the population. The country has been a party to the United Nations Convention on the Rights of Persons with Disabilities (CRPD) since 2008.

== Demographics ==
According to the 2011 national census, 10.5% (452,859) of Costa Ricans have a disability, 52% of them female and 48% male. Visual impairment that cannot be corrected with spectacles or lenses is the most common disability (56%).

A 2023 United Nations article gives figures of 18% (over 670,000) of the population, 61% female and 39% male.

== Law and policy ==
Costa Rica signed the Convention on the Rights of Persons with Disabilities on March 30, 2007, and ratified the treaty on October 1, 2008.

Under Law 7600, the Ley de Igualdad de Opportunidades (Law of Equal Opportunities), published in the Diario Oficial La Gaceta (official gazette) on May 29, 1996, no person can be discriminated against because they are disabled if they are equally capable as another person. In February 2014, Act No. 18283 of February 2014 amended the law to define persons with disabilities and accessibility in accordance with the CRPD.

In June 2012, Act No. 9049 elevated sign language to the status of an official language.

On August 30, 2016, Law No. 9379, the Ley para la Promoción de la Autonomía Personal de las Personas con Discapacidad (Law for the Promotion of Personal Autonomy for People with Disabilities) went into force to "promover y asegurar, a las personas con discapacidad, el ejercicio pleno y en igualdad de condiciones con los demás del derecho a su autonomía personal" ("to promote and ensure that persons with disabilities fully and equally exercise their right to personal autonomy"). For the purposes and application of this law, it defines a person with disabilities as:

aquellas que tengan deficiencias físicas, mentales, intelectuales o sensoriales a largo plazo que, al interactuar con diversas barreras, puedan impedir su participación plena y efectiva en la sociedad, en igualdad de condiciones con las demás (those who have long-term physical, mental, intellectual, or sensory impairments which, when interacting with various barriers, may hinder their full and effective participation in society on an equal basis with others).

== Culture ==
May 28 is the Día Nacional de la Persona con Discapacidad (National Disabled People Day) to promote respect for disabled people.

== Education ==
In 2020, 70,743 disabled students were afforded special education.

== Politics ==
The Accessibility without Exclusion Party (Partido de Acceso Sin Exclusión) has disability rights as a major policy. The party's president and, as of the 2014 general election, only member of the Legislative Assembly was Óscar López.

== Sport ==
In the 2020 Summer Paralympics, Sherman Guity won the men's 200 m T64 race and placed second in the 100 m, while he won both races at the 2024 Summer Paralympics. In the 2024 World Para Athletics Championships in Kobe, he won the 100 m event.
