= Swimming at the 2016 Summer Paralympics – Women's 100 metre backstroke S9 =

Women's 100 metre backstroke S9 at the XV Paralympic Games
- Venue: Olympic Aquatics Stadium
- Dates: 16 September 2016
- Competitors: 18 from 15 nations

Medalists
1st place, gold medalist(s)		Ellie Cole	Australia
2nd place, silver medalist(s)		Nuria Marqués Soto	Spain
3rd place, bronze medalist(s)		Hannah Aspden	United States

The women's 100 metre backstroke S9 event at the 2016 Paralympic Games took place on 16 September 2016, at the Olympic Aquatics Stadium. Three heats were held, with six swimmers each. The swimmers with the eight fastest times advanced to the final, which was won by Australia's Ellie Cole.

== Records ==
Prior to the competition, the existing World and Paralympic records were as follows:

World record	Ellie Cole (AUS)	1:08.67	Glasgow, Scotland	13 July 2015
Paralympic record	Stephanie Dixon (CAN)	1:09.30	Beijing, China	13 September 2008

Source: "Rio Results Book - Event No. 125" (PDF). Rio 2016.

== Heats ==
=== Heat 1 ===
09:52 16 September 2016

Rank	Lane	Name	Nationality	Time	Notes
1	4	Hannah Aspden	United States	1.11.78	Q
2	5	Jiexin Wang	China	1:14.14	Q
3	6	Jailing Xu	China	1:18.74	
4	3	Camille Cruz	Brazil	1:20.20	
5	2	Anchaya Ketkeraw	Thailand	1:21.66	
6	7	Paolo Alexandra Acuna Sanchez	Puerto Rico	1:26.61	

=== Heat 2 ===
09:56 16 September 2016

Rank	Lane	Name	Nationality	Time	Notes
1	4	Nuria Marqués Soto	Spain	1:11.22	Q
2	5	Amy Marren	Great Britain	1:14.06	Q
3	3	Ellen Keane	Ireland	1:15.44	Q
4	6	Tupou Neiufi	New Zealand	1:15.68	Q
5	7	Camila Haase Quiros	Costa Rica	1:23.12	
6	2	Francesca Secci	Italy		DSQ

=== Heat 3 ===
10:00 16 September 2016

Rank	Lane	Name	Nationality	Time	Notes
1	4	Ellie Cole	Australia	1:11.22	Q
2	5	Elizabeth Smith	United States	1:15.06	Q
3	6	Emily Gray	South Africa	1:16.42	
4	3	Zsofia Konkoly	Hungary	1:17.26	
5	2	Mai Ichinose	Japan	1:20.76	
6	7	Natalie Sims	United States	1:21.16	

== Final ==
17:50 16 September 2016

Rank	Lane	Name	Nationality	Time	Notes
1st place, gold medalist(s)	5	Ellie Cole	Australia	1:09.18	PR
2nd place, silver medalist(s)	4	Nuria Marqués Soto	Spain	1:09.57	
3rd place, bronze medalist(s)	3	Hannah Aspden	United States	1:10.67	
4	2	Jiesin Wang	China	1:13.54	
5	7	Elizabeth Smith	United States	1:14.48	
6	6	Amy Marren	Great Britain	1:14.58	
7	8	Tupou Neiufi	New Zealand	1:14.94	
8	1	Ellen Keane	Ireland	1:16.27	
