= Humboldt-Schule =

Humboldt-Schule may refer to any number of schools named after Alexander von Humboldt:

In Germany:

- Humboldtschule Bad Homburg
- Humboldt-Gymnasium Bad Pyrmont
- Humboldt-Gymnasium Berlin-Tegel (DE)
- Humboldtschule Bremerhaven, Oberschule (DE)
- Humboldt-Gymnasium Düsseldorf (DE)
- Humboldt-Realschule Eppelheim
- Humboldt-Schule Erfurt (DE)
- Frida-Levy-Gesamtschule (formerly Humboldtschule Essen, städt. Gymnasium) (DE)
- Humboldt-Gymnasium Gifhorn (DE)
- Humboldtschule Hannover (DE)
- Humboldt-Gymnasium Karlsruhe (DE)
- Humboldt-Schule Kiel (DE)
- Humboldt-Gymnasium Köln (DE)
- Humboldt-Schule (Leipzig), a secondary school in Leipzig today known as "Humboldt-Schule, Gymnasium der Stadt Leipzig", originally called "Humboldtschule"
- Humboldtschule Magdeburg, formerly Domgymnasium Magdeburg (DE)
- Humboldt Gymnasium Nordhausen
- Humboldtschule Offenbach am Main, Grundschule
- Humboldt-Gymnasium Radeberg (DE)
- Humboldtgymnasium Solingen (DE)
- Humboldt-Gymnasium Trier (DE)
- Humboldt-Gymnasium Ulm (DE)
- Humboldt-Gymnasium Weimar (DE)

Historic schools:

- Humboldt-Akademie (DE) in Berlin

Schools outside of Germany:

- Colegio Humboldt or Humboldt-Schule (Costa Rica)
- Colégio Humboldt São Paulo
- Deutsche Humboldtschule Guayaquil

== See also ==
- Deutsche Schule Alexander von Humboldt (disambiguation)
- Alexander-von-Humboldt-Schule (disambiguation)
- Liste Humboldt als Namensstifter (list of things named after Alexander von Humboldt)
