= Five Directions of the World =

Martial arts school in Dagestan, Russia

Coordinates: 42°51′7.93″N 47°9′14.24″E

- Пять сторон света
- Khalimbekaul, Buynaksky District, Republic of Dagestan, 368215; Russia

Information
- Established: 1996
- Founder: Gusein Magomaev; Olga Magomaev
- Website: 5storonsveta.ru

Five Directions of the World (Russian: Пять сторон света, romanized: Pyat storon sveta) is a martial arts school in Dagestan, Russia. It provides both formal education as well as training in martial arts.

== History ==
Gusein Magomaev was an artist who graduated from Dzhemal Dagestan Art School and moved to Moscow for his career. When he was young, he saw a book about Chinese martial arts which led him to be involved in martial arts. During his career as a martial artist, he was heavily involved in the art of Karate. In early 1982, there were crackdowns on martial arts for political reasons so Magomaev and his wife, Olga relocated to Dagestan in 1984.

The basis for Five Directions of the World came in 1984 from Magomaev and his wife. It was originally an arts studio based on ideas around Chinese Wushu. During the 1990s, the USSR was falling apart and social unrest followed, which was having a significant effect on the youth in Dagestan. Magomaev and his wife saw the need for action and decided to act upon it to change the situation by building a school to teach not only martial skills but also academics and arts to the Dagestani youth. In 1996, Five Directions of the World became formally established as a school. The name refers to a cosmic fifth direction which can only be accessed by the joining of the four cardinal directions (north, south, east, and west).

Al Jazeera produced a documentary on Witness about the school. The documentary, called "Dagestan’s Peaceful Warriors", was aired in 2015.

== Structure ==
There are around three to four hundred students who attend the school. They attend regular classes in subjects such as Mathematics, Russian and English languages, history, arts, etc. Students combine their academic work with martial arts training in Sanda and Taekwondo multiple times a week. This is possible because the students live at the school full time until they are allowed to go back home for their school break. Due to this, the curriculum is considered very rigorous.

Admission to the school starts from grade 5 after passing entry examinations both academic and medical, with only boys qualifying for the live-in option. Local girls can attend the school's academic and Taekwondo programs and after lessons back to their homes every day. There is also an option for boys to attend the Sanda program only. Applicants not only come from Dagestan but also from other Russian areas.

== Achievements ==
The school has produced more Russian and European Sanda champions than any other school, and has also produced Olympic gold medalist and the first non-Chinese "King of Kung Fu", Muslim Salikhov. For this reason, the school has been dubbed the "Shaolin of Dagestan" by some. In addition its alumni have achieved success in other combat sports such as taekwondo and mixed martial arts.

In 2015, the school was included in the "100 best schools of Russia" competition hosted by the All-Russian Educational Forum.

== Notable alumni ==
- Muslim Salikhov – 2008 Olympic Gold Medalist, multiple time Wushu Sanda world champion, UFC fighter, peak ranking No. 14 in UFC welterweight division
- Bozigit Ataev – multiple time Wushu Sanda world champion, MMA fighter
- Zabit Magomedsharipov – Wushu Sanda European champion, UFC fighter, peak ranking No. 3 in UFC featherweight division
- Khasan Magomedsharipov – Wushu Sanda Junior European champion, Bellator MMA fighter
- Gadzhi Umarov – participant in Taekwondo at the 2012 Summer Olympics
- Zainutdin Ataev – Bronze medalist in Taekwondo at the 2020 Summer Paralympics at men's +75 kg.
- Magomed Magomedov – MMA fighter, first fighter to defeat UFC Bantamweight Champion, Petr Yan.
