= Archery at the 2023 Parapan American Games – Mixed team compound open =

Mixed team compound open at the 2023 Parapan American Games
- Venue: Archery Center
- Dates: November 19 - November 21
- Competitors: 14 from 7 nations

Medalists
1st place, gold medalist(s)		Wendy Gardner; Kevin Polish	United States
2nd place, silver medalist(s)		Diana Gonzabay; Joffre Villavicencio	Ecuador
3rd place, bronze medalist(s)		Yasneide Peñaranda; Cristian Correa	Colombia

The mixed team compound open competition of the archery events at the 2023 Parapan American Games was held from November 19 to 21 at the Archery Center in Santiago, Chile.

== Schedule ==
Date	Time	Round
November 19, 2023	09:00	Ranking Round
November 21, 2023	09:35	Quarterfinals
November 21, 2023	10:10	Semifinals
November 21, 2023	10:50	Final

== Results ==
WR world record | AR area record | CR championship record | GR games record | NR national record | OR Olympic record | PB personal best | SB season best | WL world leading (in a given season)

=== Ranking round ===
The results were as follows:

Rank	Archer	Nation	Individual score	Total	Note
1	Wendy Gardner; Kevin Polish	United States	638; 699	1337	
2	Pilar Riveros; Diego Quesada	Costa Rica	659; 676	1335	
3	Yasneide Peñaranda; Cristian Correa	Colombia	652; 668	1320	
4	Lya Sánchez; Víctor Sardina	Mexico	638; 672	1310	
5	Helena Moraes; Andrey de Castro	Brazil	626; 668	1294	
6	Mariana Zúñiga; Alfonso Díaz	Chile	677; 604	1281	
7	Diana Gonzabay; Joffre Villavicencio	Ecuador	648; 625	1273	

=== Competition rounds ===
The results during the elimination rounds and final rounds were as follows:

==== Finals ====
Quarterfinals
5	H. Moraes (BRA); A. de Castro (BRA)	149
4	L. Sánchez (MEX); V. Sardina (MEX)	137
3	Y. Peñaranda (COL); C. Correa (COL)	148
6	M. Zúñiga (CHI); A. Díaz (CHI)	143
7	D. Gonzabay (ECU); J. Villavicencio (ECU)	147
2	P. Riveros (CRC); D. Quesada (CRC)	143

Semifinals
1	W. Gardner (USA); K. Polish (USA)	151
5	H. Moraes (BRA); A. de Castro (BRA)	144
3	Y. Peñaranda (COL); C. Correa (COL)	145
7	D. Gonzabay (ECU); J. Villavicencio (ECU)	145

Final
1	W. Gardner (USA); K. Polish (USA)	148
7	D. Gonzabay (ECU); J. Villavicencio (ECU)	143
Bronze medal match
5	H. Moraes (BRA); A. de Castro (BRA)	140
3	Y. Peñaranda (COL); C. Correa (COL)	142
