= Costa Rica at the 2020 Summer Paralympics =

- IPC code: CRC
- NPC: Comite Paralimpico de Costa Rica

in Tokyo
- Competitors: 9 in 7 sports
- Flag bearers: Camila Haase & Steven Roman
- Medals Ranked 55th: Gold 1 Silver 1 Bronze 0 Total 2

Summer Paralympics appearances (overview)
- 1992; 1996; 2000; 2004; 2008; 2012; 2016; 2020; 2024

Costa Rica competed at the 2020 Summer Paralympics in Tokyo, Japan, from 24 August to 5 September 2021.

== Medalists ==
Medal	Name	Sport	Event	Date
Gold	Sherman Isidro Guity Guity	Athletics	Men's 200 meters T64	4 September
Silver	Sherman Isidro Guity Guity	Athletics	Men's 100 metres T64	30 August

== Archery ==
Athlete	Event	Ranking round		Round of 64	Round of 32	Round of 16	Quarterfinals	Semifinals	Final / BM
Athlete	Event	Score	Seed	Opposition Score	Opposition Score	Opposition Score	Opposition Score	Opposition Score	Rank
Diego Quesada	Men's individual compound open	661 SB	32	Echeverría (MEX) W 139–131	He (CHN) L 140–143	Did Not Advance			17

== Athletics ==
DQ: Disqualified | Q: Qualified by place or standard based on overall position after heats | DNA: Did not advance | N/A: Not available, stage was not contested | PB: Personal Best | PR: Paralympic Record

Athlete	Event	Heats		Final	
Athlete	Event	Result	Rank	Result	Rank
Sherman Guity	Men's 100m T64	10.88 PB	2 Q	10.78	Silver medal
Sherman Guity	Men's 200m T64	21.85 PR	1 Q	21.43 PR	Gold medal
Ernesto Fonseca	Men's 100m T51	N/A		25.13	8
Ernesto Fonseca	Men's 200m T51	N/A		47.95	7
Melissa Calvo	Women's 100m T13	14.25	6	DNA	18
Melissa Calvo	Women's 100m T13	DQ			

== Cycling ==
Costa Rica sent one cyclist after successfully getting a slot in the 2018 UCI Nations Ranking Allocation quota for the Americas.

Athlete	Event	Time	Rank
Henry Raabe	Road race C1-2-3	2:26:05	23
Henry Raabe	Time trial C3	39:37.64	13

== Swimming ==
DSQ: Disqualified | DNA: Did not advance

Athlete	Event	Heats		Final	
Athlete	Event	Time	Rank	Time	Rank
Camila Haase	Women's 100m breaststroke SB9	1:35.36	7	DNA	13
Camila Haase	Women's 100m backstroke S9	1:22.65	4	DNA	9
Camila Haase	Women's 200m individual medley SM9	DSQ			

== Table tennis ==
Athlete	Event	Group Stage			Round 1	Quarterfinals	Semifinals	Final	
Athlete	Event	Opposition Result	Opposition Result	Rank	Opposition Result	Opposition Result	Opposition Result	Opposition Result	Rank
Steven Roman	Individual C8	Nikolenko (UKR)L 0-3	Csonka (HUN)L 0-3	3	Did not advance				

== Taekwondo ==
Athlete	Event	Round of 16	Quarterfinals	Semifinals	Repechage Quarterfinal	Repechage Semifinal	Final / BM	
Athlete	Event	Opposition Result	Opposition Result	Opposition Result	Opposition Result	Opposition Result	Opposition Result	Rank
Esteban Molina	Men's +75 kg	Omirali (KAZ) W 12-6, PTF	Aziziaghdam (IRI) L 11-9, PTF	DNA	Loonstra (ARU) W 16-3, PTF	Abidar (LBA) W 19-17, PTF	Medell (USA) L 13-11, PTF	5

== Wheelchair tennis ==
Costa Rica qualified one player entry for wheelchair tennis. Jose Pablo Gil qualified by receiving the bipartite commission invitation allocation quota.

Athlete	Event	Round of 64	Round of 32	Round of 16	Quarterfinals	Semifinals	Final / BM	
Athlete	Event	Opposition Result	Opposition Result	Opposition Result	Opposition Result	Opposition Result	Opposition Result	Rank
Jose Pablo Gil	Men's singles	Borhan (MAS); L 6-4, 3-6, 2-6	Did not advance					33

== See also ==
- Costa Rica at the 2020 Summer Olympics
- Costa Rica at the Paralympics
