= Christiana Figueres =

Costa Rican diplomat (born 1956)

Christiana Figueres DBE
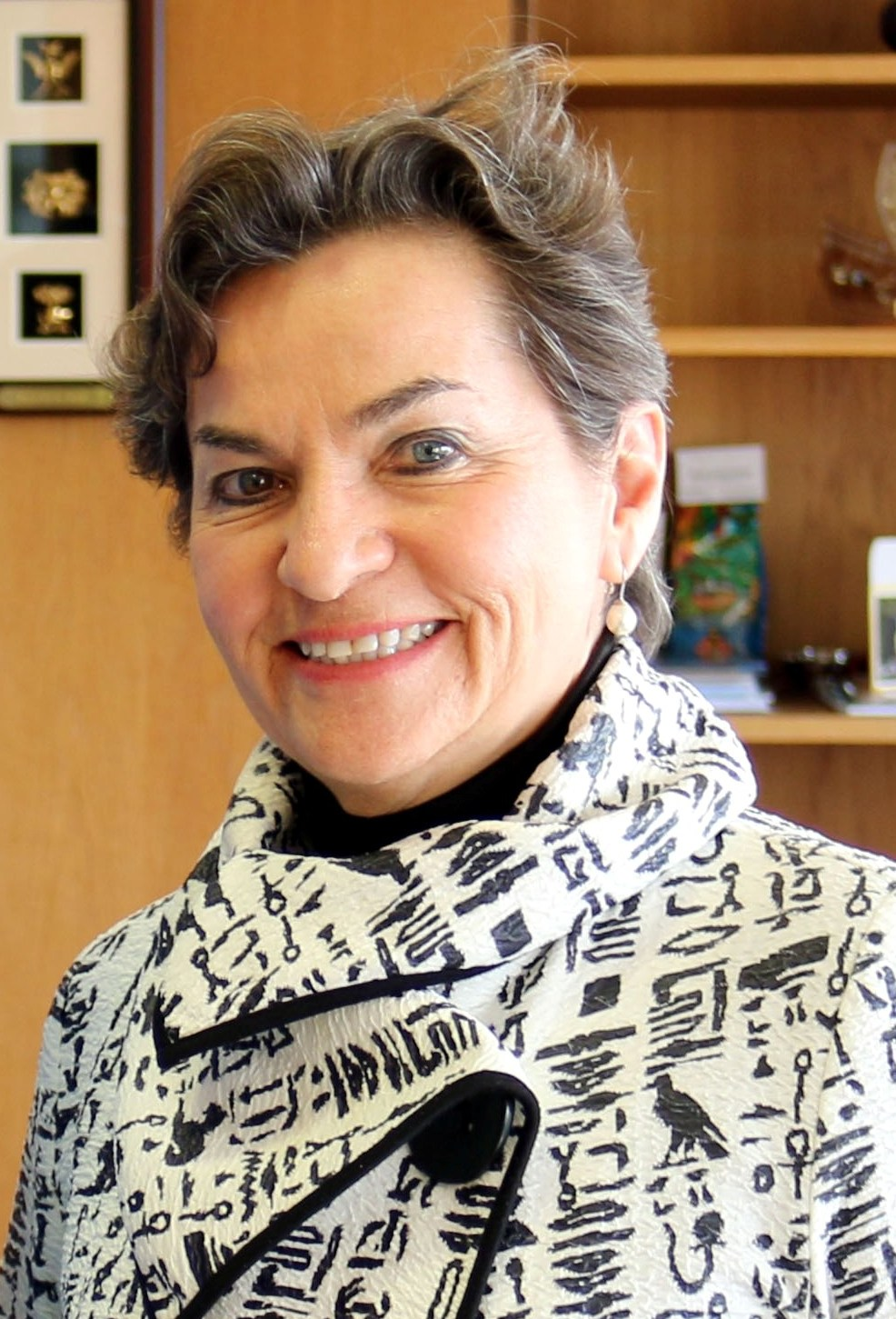
- Figueres in 2018

Executive Secretary of the United Nations Framework Convention on Climate Change
- In office 1 July 2010 – 18 July 2016
- Secretary- General: Ban Ki-moon
- Preceded by: Yvo de Boer
- Succeeded by: Patricia Espinosa

Personal details
- Born: Karen Christiana Figueres Olsen; 7 August 1956 (age 70) San José, Costa Rica
- Children: 2
- Parents: José Figueres Ferrer (father); Karen Olsen Beck (mother)
- Education: Swarthmore College (BA); London School of Economics (MSc)
- Website: Official website

External videos
- Christiana Figueres: The case for stubborn optimism on climate, TED Talks, 2020
- Christiana Figueres: What I Really Care About, GOOD Magazine, 2020
- Former UN climate chief Christiana Figueres says Australia needs to ditch coal, Matter Of Fact With Stan Grant, ABC News, 2018

Karen Christiana Figueres Olsen DBE (born 7 August 1956) is a Costa Rican diplomat who has led national, international and multilateral policy negotiations. She was appointed Executive Secretary of the UN Framework Convention on Climate Change (UNFCCC) in July 2010, six months after the failed COP15 in Copenhagen. During the next six years she worked to rebuild the global climate change negotiating process, leading to the 2015 Paris Agreement, widely recognized as a historic achievement.

Over the years Figueres has worked in the fields of climate change, technical and financial cooperation, energy, land use and sustainable development. In 2016, she was Costa Rica's candidate for the United Nations Secretary General and was an early frontrunner, but decided to withdraw after garnering insufficient support. She is a founder of the Global Optimism group, co-author of The Future We Choose: Surviving the Climate Crisis (2020) along with Tom Rivett-Carnac, and co-host of the popular podcast Outrage and Optimism.

== Early life ==
Figueres was born in San José, Costa Rica. Her father, José Figueres Ferrer, was President of Costa Rica three times. Figueres' mother, Karen Olsen Beck, served as Costa Rican Ambassador to Israel in 1982, and was a member of the Legislative Assembly from 1990 to 1994. The couple had four children. Figueres' older brother José Figueres Olsen, was also President of Costa Rica (1994–1998).

Growing up in La Lucha, Figueres attended the local Cecilia Orlich grammar school. She moved to the German Humboldt Schule in the capital and later graduated from Lincoln High School. She travelled to England for a year of A Level studies before entering Swarthmore College in Pennsylvania, graduating in 1979. As part of her studies in anthropology, she lived in Bribri, Talamanca, a remote indigenous village in the Southeastern plateau of Costa Rica for one year. She then went to the London School of Economics for a master's degree in social anthropology and graduated in 1981. She earned a certificate in Organizational Development from Georgetown University. Figueres' daughter Naima was born in Guatemala in March 1988, and daughter Yihana was born in Washington DC in December 1989.

== Early career ==
Figueres began her public service career as Minister Counselor at the Embassy of Costa Rica in Bonn, West Germany, from 1982 to 1985.

Returning to Costa Rica in 1987, Figueres was named Director of International Cooperation in the Ministry of Planning. There she designed and directed the negotiation of comprehensive financial and technical cooperation programs with eight European countries, and supervised the evaluation of all national technical and financial assistance requests. She served as the Chief of Staff to the Minister of Agriculture between 1988 and 1990. She supervised the execution of 22 national programs involving training, credit and marketing.

In 1989, Figueres moved with her husband to Washington, D.C. and for several years devoted herself to bringing up their two daughters. In 1994, she re-entered professional life and became the Director of the Renewable Energy in the Americas (REIA) initiative, today housed at the Organisation of American States (OAS).

In 1995, she founded and became the executive director of the Center for Sustainable Development in the Americas, a non-profit organization dedicated to promoting the participation of Latin American countries in the Climate Change Convention. She worked there as executive director for eight years.

=== International negotiator ===
Representing the Government of Costa Rica, Figueres was a negotiator of the United Nations Convention on Climate Change 1995–2010. In 1997 she provided critical international strategy for achieving developing country support and approval of the Kyoto Protocol and the Clean Development Mechanism (CDM). From 2007 to 2009 she was Vice President of the Bureau of the Climate Convention, representing Latin America and the Caribbean. Over the years she chaired various international negotiations:

- Co-chair of the Contact Group on Guidance to the CDM Executive Board: Nairobi, December 2006; Poznan, December 2008; Copenhagen, December 2009.
- Co-chair of the Contact Group on flexibility mechanisms for the post 2012 regime, Bonn in June 2008, Accra, Ghana in August 2008, and Poznan in December 2008.
- Member of the Friends of the Chair Group that negotiated the Bali Action Plan for long term cooperative action of all nations, Bali, Indonesia, December 2007.

=== Programmatic Clean Development Mechanism ===
In 2002 Figueres proposed a "Sectoral CDM" under which developing countries would be encouraged to develop regional or sectoral projects that could be the result of specific sustainable development policies. In 2005 she published a study proposing "programmatic CDM" whereby emission reductions are achieved not by one single site, but rather by multiple actions executed over time as the result of a government measure or a voluntary program.

In December 2005 Figueres took the idea to the COP11 in Montreal, and achieved support for it on behalf of the Group of 77 and China. She then took the lead in negotiating the concept with the various groups of industrialized countries, finally attaining a Conference of the Parties (COP) decision to allow "programs of activities" in the CDM. Two years later, as member of the CDM Executive Board, she achieved consensus on the rules and procedures for the submission of "programs of activities" in the CDM.

=== Private sector ===
In 2008 and 2009 Figueres collaborated with private sector companies that aligned themselves with climate friendly goals. Figueres served as Senior Adviser to C-Quest Capital, a carbon finance company focusing on programmatic CDM investments. She was the Principal Climate Change Advisor to ENDESA Latinoamérica, the largest private utility in Latin America with operations in Argentina, Brazil, Chile, Colombia and Peru. She was also Vice Chair of the Rating Committee of the Carbon Rating Agency, the first entity to apply credit rating expertise to carbon assets.

=== Non profit engagements ===
- Vice President of the Bureau of the UN Framework Convention on Climate Change, 2008–2009.
- Board of Directors and Trustee, Winrock International. 2005–present. Chair of the Governance Committee and Member of the executive committee, 2007–?
- Board of Trustees of the Fundación para el Desarrollo de la Cordillera Volcánica Centrales (FUNDECOR), Costa Rican organization with an endowment of $15 million and which received the 2001 King Bauldwin Award. 1999–present
- Board of Directors, International Institute for Energy Conservation, 2006–2008

== Leading the United Nations Framework Convention on Climate Change ==
Following the failed COP15 climate change conference in Copenhagen, the UN Secretary General appointed Figueres as new Executive Secretary of the United Nations Framework Convention on Climate Change, starting her first term in July 2010. Upon starting the role, she advocated for a shift in strategy: moving from the top-down logic of the Kyoto Protocol to a bottom up logic based on national self interest in the context of scientific projections.

During her tenure as Executive Secretary, she led the UN Climate Change Secretariat's six annual negotiation sessions, culminating in the Paris Agreement in December 2015. She collaborated with yearly rotating presidencies (Mexico, South Africa, Qatar, Poland, Peru and France) as a way to support the negotiations.

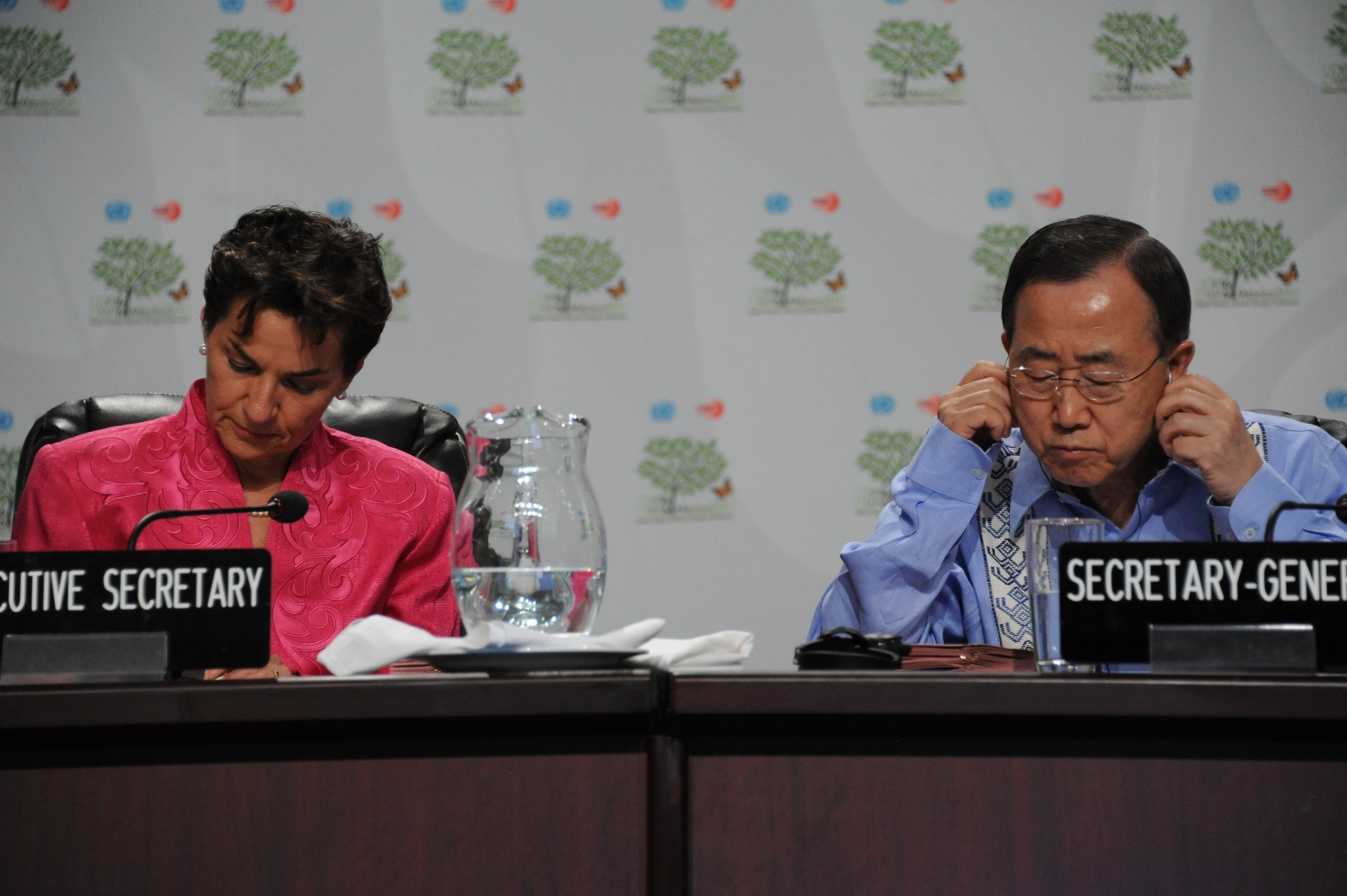
Figueres with Ban Ki-Moon at the Cancun conference

Under the presidency of Patricia Espinosa (Mexico) COP16 in 2010 marked a radical departure from the previous conference in Copenhagen, delivering a comprehensive package infrastructure to assist developing nations including the Green Climate Fund, the UNFCCC Technology Mechanism, and the Cancun Adaptation Framework.

At COP17 held in Durban in December 2011, governments committed for the first time to collectively develop a new universal climate change agreement by 2015 for the period beyond 2020. Connie Hedegaard, the EU's top climate official, played a pivotal role to change the course of negotiations.

The work toward that global legal framework was initiated at COP18 Doha in November 2012, at the same time as the second commitment period of the Kyoto Protocol was adopted under the Doha Amendment. At COP19 in Warsaw in 2013 governments continued to work toward the global framework but also adopted a rulebook for reducing emissions from deforestation and forest degradation and a mechanism to address loss and damage caused by long-term climate change impacts. Gathering in Lima for COP20 at the end of 2014, governments defined the core elements of the upcoming agreement, and agreed on the ground rules to submit national contributions in the run up to the 2015 negotiation. From then on, Figueres' efforts were focused on raising the ambition of the emerging agreement to ensure that it would be science based and long lasting.

=== Paris Agreement ===
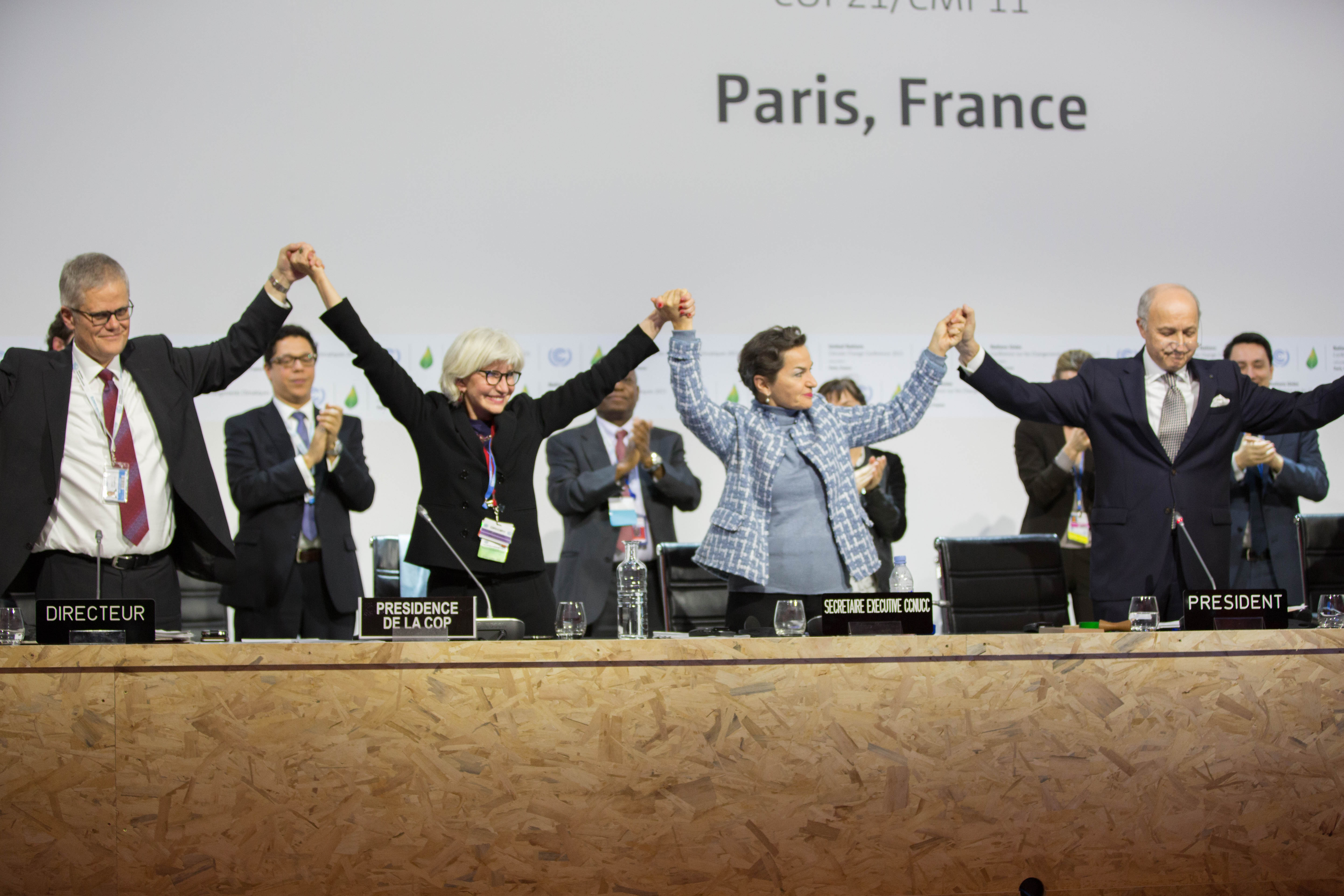
Adoption of the Paris agreement

COP21 held in Paris in December 2015 is widely recognized as a historic achievement. With the leadership of the United Nations Secretary-General and President Hollande of France, and beating previous records of Head of State gatherings on one day, 155 Heads of State came together to send a strong political signal of support for an ambitious and effective agreement. On the final day under the presidency of Laurent Fabius the 195 governments which are Parties to the Climate Change Convention unanimously adopted the Paris Agreement, with the goal of accelerating the intentional transformation of the global economy toward low carbon and high resilience. Figueres and the French hosts had made sure the major negotiation obstacles were resolved before the start of the Agreement.

Figueres spent much of her tenure approaching key stakeholders beyond governments by engaging technology providers, financial institutions including insurance companies, the science community, faith groups, youth and women's groups, and other members of society, encouraging them to partake in the global efforts to address climate change. In 2013, she addressed the World Coal Association, commented that the coal industry faces business continuation risks, but inviting them to be a part of the global solution.

Figueres completed her second term as Executive Secretary of the UNFCCC on 6 July 2016.

The Teaching Negotiation Center's has issued a paper on how to convey the climate change messaging. In a June 2026, it credits Christiana Figueres for overcoming an "insurmountable challenge" that will "save the planet."

"Figueres had to personally undergo a transformation to let go of her identity as a Costa Rican diplomat so she could approach the negotiations from a global perspective and meet each participating nation from its vantage point," the blog said.

The "major lessons" she taught: diagnosing adaptive challenges across multiple levels; integrating leadership both internally and externally; reframing process, language and relationships to build trust.

== Post-UNFCCC career ==
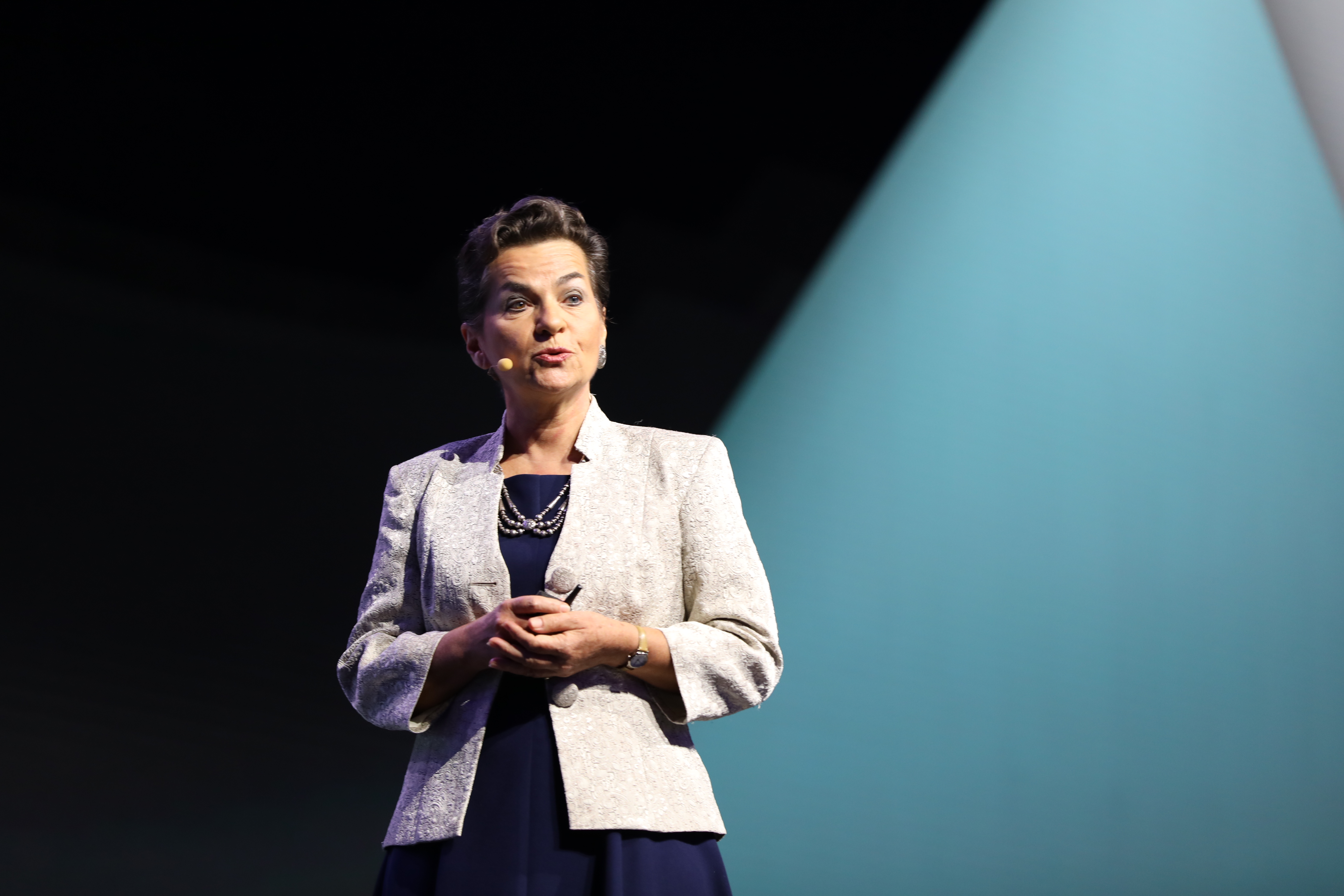
Christiana Figueres at Stockholm Resilience Centre for Mission 2020

After her tenure as Executive Secretary, Figueres worked as convenor of Mission 2020 and served as chair of the advisory board of The Lancet Countdown: Tracking Progress on Health and Climate Change. She is a founder of the Global Optimism group, co-author of the book The Future We Choose and co-host of the popular podcast Outrage and Optimism. Other activities include:

- Chair of The Earthshot Prize Foundation 2021–2026
- B Team Leader (since 2016)
- Impossible Foods, Member of the Board of Directors (2021)
- Acciona, Member of the Board of Directors (since 2017)
- Acciona Energía, Member of the Board of Directors (since 2021)
- Eni, Member of the advisory board (since 2017)
- Formula E, Co-chair of the Global Advisory Board (since 2017)
- International Olympic Committee (IOC), Member of the Sustainability and Legacy Commission
- World Resources Institute (WRI), Member of the Board of Directors
- Inter-American Dialogue, Member (since 1995)

=== United Nations Secretary-General candidacy ===
On 7 July 2016, Figueres became the official Costa Rican candidate for the United Nations Secretary General. She was an early frontrunner, but decided to withdraw in September after garnishing insufficient support in the third and fourth round of voting.

During the UN Secretary General debate held by Al Jazeera, Christina Figuerres raised her hand when the candidates were all asked who thought victims of cholera deserved an apology. The UN's role in the Haiti cholera outbreak has been widely discussed and criticized. The UN peacekeepers may have been the proximate cause for bringing cholera to Haiti. Thirty-seven human rights organizations signed a UN Secretary General accountability pledge asking the candidates to take action on two human rights violations that have damaged the United Nations' image: failing to provide remedies for victims of cholera in Haiti, and sexual exploitation and abuse by peacekeepers. Despite her stance at the UNSG debates, her office declined to support the pledge."

== Awards and honours ==
Figueres has been awarded several honours and awards, including several honorary doctorates.

=== From governments ===
- Honorary Dame Commander of the Order of the British Empire (DBE), United Kingdom, 2022
- Premio con motivo de los 500 años del Descubrimiento del Estrecho de Magallanes, Chile 2020
- Condecoración al Mérito de la Paz y la Democracia, Costa Rica 2018
- Officer of the Order of Orange-Nassau, Netherlands, 2016
- Legion of Honour, France, 2016
- Medal of the City of Paris, 2015
- Grand Cross of the Order of Merit of the Federal Republic of Germany, 1985

=== From civil society ===
- The 2019 Dan David Prize for combating climate change
- The Ewald von Kleist peace award from the Munich Security Conference, 2016
- Hero for the Planet Award by the National Geographic Magazine and the Ford Motor Company, March 2001, in recognition of international leadership in sustainable energy
- The 2015 Hero of El Pais newspaper of Spain
- Fortune magazine listed her number seven of the World's 2016 50 Greatest Leaders, the only female Latin American to be listed
- Time magazine included her in the top 100 influential leaders of the world for 2016
- The Nature Journal of Science listed her first on the list of 2015 Top 10
- In November 2023, Figueres was named to the BBC's 100 Women list.

=== Honorary doctorates ===
- Honorary Doctor of Human Letters, American University of Beirut, 2025
- Doctor of Humane Letters, Yale University, 2020
- Doctor of Laws, University of Bristol, 2019
- Doctor of honoris causa, The University of Edinburgh, 2019
- Honorary Degree, University of Warwick, 2017
- Honorary Degree, Cranfield University, 2017
- Honorary Doctor of Humane Letters degree by Georgetown University, 2016
- Honorary doctorate by Concordia University, 2015
- Honorary doctorate of law degree by University of Massachusetts Boston, 2014

== Books ==
- Co-author with Tom Rivett-Carnac, The Future We Choose: Surviving the Climate Crisis (Manilla Press, 2020) ISBN 978-0-525-65835-1.

== See also ==
- An Inconvenient Sequel: Truth to Power

Diplomatic posts
Preceded by Yvo de Boer	Executive Secretary of the United Nations Framework Convention on Climate Change; 2010–2016	Succeeded by Patricia Espinosa
