= Archery at the 2023 Parapan American Games – Men's individual compound open =

Men's individual compound open at the 2023 Parapan American Games
- Venue: Archery Center
- Dates: November 19 - November 22
- Competitors: 12 from 12 nations

Medalists
| 1st place, gold medalist(s) | | Kevin Polish | United States |
| 2nd place, silver medalist(s) | | Kyle Tremblay | Costa Rica |
| 3rd place, bronze medalist(s) | | Diego Quesada | Canada |

The men's individual compound open competition of the archery events at the 2023 Parapan American Games was held from November 19 to 22 at the Archery Center in Santiago, Chile.

== Schedule ==
| Date | Time | Round |
|---|---|---|
| November 19, 2023 | 13:30 | Ranking Round |
| November 20, 2023 | 09:00 | Round of 16 |
| November 20, 2023 | 09:45 | Quarterfinals |
| November 20, 2023 | 10:25 | Semifinals |
| November 22, 2023 | 11:00 | Final |

== Results ==
WR world record | AR area record | CR championship record | GR games record | NR national record | OR Olympic record | PB personal best | SB season best | WL world leading (in a given season)

=== Ranking round ===
The results were as follows:

| Rank | Archer | Nation | Score | Notes |
|---|---|---|---|---|
| 1 | Kevin Polish | United States | 699 | PR |
| 2 | Kyle Tremblay | Canada | 683 | |
| 3 | Diego Quesada | Costa Rica | 676 | |
| 4 | Victor Sardina | Mexico | 672 | |
| 5 | Cristian Correa | Colombia | 668 | |
| 6 | Andrey de Castro | Brazil | 668 | |
| 7 | Ricardo Rosario | Puerto Rico | 644 | |
| 8 | Federico Paolorossi | Argentina | 635 | |
| 9 | Edixon Parada | Venezuela | 628 | |
| 10 | Joffre Villavicencio | Ecuador | 625 | |
| 11 | Alfonso Díaz | Chile | 604 | |
| 12 | Ever Lemus | El Salvador | 578 | |

=== Competition rounds ===
The results during the elimination rounds were as follows:

Round of 16
9 | E. Parada (VEN) | 1 | 2 | 1 | 2 | 2
8 | F. Paolorossi (ARG) | 1 | 0 | 2 | 0 | 0
5 | C. Correa (COL) | 2 | 2 | 2 | 2 | 2
12 | E. Lemus (ESA) | 0 | 0 | 0 | 0 | 0
11 | A. Díaz (CHI) | 0 | 2 | 0 | 1 | 0
6 | A. de Castro (BRA) | 2 | 0 | 2 | 1 | 2
7 | R. Rosario (PUR) | 0 | 2 | 0 | 0 | 0
10 | J. Villavicencio (ECU) | 2 | 0 | 2 | 2 | 2

Quarterfinals
1 | K. Polish (USA) | 2 | 1 | 2 | 2 | 2
9 | E. Parada (VEN) | 0 | 1 | 0 | 0 | 0
5 | C. Correa (COL) | 1 | 0 | 0 | 0 | 0
4 | V. Sardina (MEX) | 1 | 2 | 2 | 2 | 2
3 | D. Quesada (CRC) | 2 | 1 | 2 | 0 | 0
6 | A. de Castro (BRA) | 0 | 1 | 0 | 2 | 2
10 | J. Villavicencio (ECU) | 0 | 0 | 0 | 2 | 2
2 | K. Tremblay (CAN) | 2 | 2 | 2 | 0 | 0

Semifinals
1 | K. Polish (USA) | 0 | 0 | 1 | 2 | 2
4 | V. Sardina (MEX) | 2 | 2 | 1 | 0 | 0
3 | D. Quesada (CRC) | 0 | 0 | 2 | 2 | 2
2 | K. Tremblay (CAN) | 2 | 2 | 0 | 0 | 0

Final
1 | K. Polish (USA) | 2 | 2 | 2 | 2 | 0
3 | D. Quesada (CRC) | 0 | 0 | 0 | 0 | 2
Bronze medal match
4 | V. Sardina (MEX) | 0 | 1 | 1 | 1 | 2
2 | K. Tremblay (CAN) | 2 | 1 | 1 | 1 | 0
