= Costa Rica at the Paralympics =

- IPC code: CRC
- NPC: Comite Paralimpico de Costa Rica
- Medals: Gold 3 Silver 1 Bronze 0 Total 4

Summer appearances
- 1992; 1996; 2000; 2004; 2008; 2012; 2016; 2020; 2024

Costa Rica made its Paralympic Games début at the 1992 Summer Paralympics in Barcelona, sending just two representatives to compete in men's track and field. Absent in 1996, it returned in 2000, and has participated in every edition of the Summer Paralympics since then. Its delegations have always been small: a single athlete in track and field in 2000; a single swimmer in 2004; two table tennis players in 2008, a single athlete in track and field and a cyclist on 2012.

Sherman Guity is the country's only medalist, with three golds and one silver, all in sprinting in the T64 category.

Costa Rica has never taken part in the Winter Paralympics.

== List of medalists ==
Medal	Name	Games	Sport	Event
Silver	Sherman Guity	(Japan) 2020 Tokyo	Athletics	Men's 100 metres T64
Gold	Sherman Guity	(Japan) 2020 Tokyo	Athletics	Men's 200 metres T64
Gold	Sherman Guity	(France) 2024 Paris	Athletics	Men's 100 metres T64
Gold	Sherman Guity	(France) 2024 Paris	Athletics	Men's 200 metres T64

== See also ==
- Costa Rica at the Olympics
