= Costa Rica at the 2024 Summer Paralympics =

- Flag of Costa Rica
- IPC code: CRC
- NPC: Comité Paralímpico de Costa Rica

in Paris, France August 28, 2024 – September 8, 2024
- Competitors: 8 (5 men and 3 women) in 6 sports
- Flag bearers: Andres Molina; Maria del Pilar Riveros
- Medals Ranked 49th: Gold 2 Silver 0 Bronze 0 Total 2

Summer Paralympics appearances (overview)
- 1992; 1996; 2000; 2004; 2008; 2012; 2016; 2020; 2024

Costa Rica competed at the 2024 Summer Paralympics in Paris, France, from 28 August to 8 September, 2024.

== Medalists ==
Medal	Name	Sport	Event	Date
Gold	Sherman Guity	Athletics	Men's 100m T64	2 September
Gold	Sherman Guity	Athletics	Men's 200m T64	7 September

=== Medals by sport ===
Medals by sport
Sport	1st place, gold medalist(s)	2nd place, silver medalist(s)	3rd place, bronze medalist(s)	Total
Athletics	2	0	0	2
Total	2	0	0	2

=== Medals by gender ===
Medals by gender
Gender	1st place, gold medalist(s)	2nd place, silver medalist(s)	3rd place, bronze medalist(s)	Total
Female	0	0	0	0
Male	2	0	0	2
Mixed	0	0	0	0
Total	2	0	0	2

=== Medals by date ===
Medals by date
Date	1st place, gold medalist(s)	2nd place, silver medalist(s)	3rd place, bronze medalist(s)	Total
2 September	1	0	0	1
7 September	1	0	0	1
Total	2	0	0	2

== Competitors ==
The following is the list of number of competitors in the Games.

Sport	Men	Women	Total
Archery	1	1	2
Athletics	2	0	2
Shooting	0	1	1
Swimming	0	1	1
Taekwondo	1	0	1
Wheelchair tennis	1	0	1
Total	5	3	8

== Archery ==
Costa Rica entered one male and one female archers into the games by virtue of their result at the 2023 World Para Archery Championships in Plzeň, Czech Republic and 2023 Parapan American Games in Santiago, Chile.

Athlete	Event	Ranking Round		Round of 32	Round of 16	Quarterfinals	Semifinals	Finals	
Athlete	Event	Score	Seed	Opposition Score	Opposition Score	Opposition Score	Opposition Score	Opposition Score	Rank
Diego Quesada Arias	Men's individual compound	313	32	Ai (CHN); L DNS	Did not advance				
María del Pilar Riveros	Women's individual compound	681	10	Tanner (AUS); L 133–137	Did not advance				
Diego Quesada Arias; María del Pilar Riveros	Mixed team compound	994	13	—N/a	Charão / Gögel (BRA); L DNS	Did not advance			

== Athletics ==
Costa Rican track and field athletes achieved quota places for the following events based on their results at the 2023 World Championships, 2024 World Championships, or through high performance allocation, as long as they meet the minimum entry standard (MES).

Key

- Note–Ranks given for track events are within the athlete's heat only
- Q = Qualified for the next round
- q = Qualified for the next round as a fastest loser or, in field events, by position without achieving the qualifying target
- DQ = Disqualified
- PR = Paralympic Record
- AR = Area (or continental) Record
- NR = National Record
- SB = Season's Best
- N/A = Round not applicable for the event
- Bye = Athlete not required to compete in round

Track & road events

Athlete	Event	Heat		Final	
Athlete	Event	Result	Rank	Result	Rank
Ernesto Fonseca	Men's 100 m T51	—N/a		24.80	7
Ernesto Fonseca	Men's 200 m T51	—N/a		46.10 SB	7
Sherman Guity	Men's 100 m T64	10.72	1 Q	10.65 PR	1st place, gold medalist(s)
Sherman Guity	Men's 200 m T64	22.29	1 Q	21.32	1st place, gold medalist(s)

== Shooting ==
For the first time, Costa Rica entered one para-shooter's after achieved quota places for the following events by virtue of their best finishes at the 2022, 2023 and 2024 world cup, 2022 World Championships, 2023 World Championships and 2023 Parapan American Games, as long as they obtained a minimum qualifying score (MQS).

Women

Athlete	Event	Qualification		Final	
Athlete	Event	Points	Rank	Points	Rank
Paola Maria Arana Loria	P2 – 10 m air pistol SH1	517-7x	18	Did not advance	

== Swimming ==
Women

Athlete	Event	Heats		Final	
Athlete	Event	Result	Rank	Result	Rank
Camila Haase	Women's 100 m breaststroke SB8	DSQ		Did not advance	
Camila Haase	Women's 200 m individual medley SM9	3:07.21	15	Did not advance	

== Taekwondo ==
Athlete	Event	First round	Quarterfinals	Semifinals	Repechage 1	Repechage 2	Final / BM	
Athlete	Event	Opposition Result	Opposition Result	Opposition Result	Opposition Result	Opposition Result	Opposition Result	Rank
Andres Molina	Men's 80 kg	Loonstra (ARU); W 12–10	Toshtemirov (UZB); L 5–22	—N/a		Dombayev (KAZ); L 7–18	Did not advance	

== Wheelchair tennis ==
Athlete	Event	Round of 64	Round of 32	Round of 16	Quarterfinals	Semifinals	Final / BM	
Athlete	Event	Opposition Score	Opposition Score	Opposition Score	Opposition Score	Opposition Score	Opposition Score	Rank
José Pablo Gil	Men's singles	Stroud (USA); L 3–6,1–6	Did not advance					

== See also ==
- Costa Rica at the 2024 Summer Olympics
- Costa Rica at the Paralympics
