= Costa Rica at the 2008 Summer Paralympics =

- IPC code: CRC
- NPC: Comite Paralimpico de Costa Rica

in Beijing
- Competitors: 2 in 1 sport
- Medals: Gold 0 Silver 0 Bronze 0 Total 0

Summer Paralympics appearances (overview)
- 1992; 1996; 2000; 2004; 2008; 2012; 2016; 2020; 2024

Costa Rica sent a delegation to compete at the 2008 Summer Paralympics in Beijing, People's Republic of China. The delegation consisted of two competitors, both table tennis players.

== Table tennis ==
Athlete	Event	Group matches	Round of 16	Quarterfinals	Semifinals	Final Bronze final	
Athlete	Event	Opposition Result	Opposition Result	Opposition Result	Opposition Result	Opposition Result	Rank
Geovanni Rodriguez	Men's singles class 3	Kesler (SRB); L 1–3 Molitierno (ITA); L 1–3	did not advance				
Domingo Arguello Garcia	Men's singles class 6	Rosenmeier (DEN); L 0–3 Buzin (RUS); L 2–3 du Plooy (RSA); L 0–3	N/A		did not advance		

== See also ==
- Costa Rica at the Paralympics
- Costa Rica at the 2008 Summer Olympics
