= Ivan Mikulić (taekwondo) =

Croatian para taekwondo practitioner

Personal information
- Born: 30 January 1995 (age 31) Split, Croatia

Sport
- Country: Croatia
- Sport: Para taekwondo
Medal record
Representing Croatia
Paralympic Games
| Silver medal – second place | 2020 Tokyo | +75 kg |
European Championships
| Silver medal – second place | 2026 Munich | +80 kg |

Ivan Mikulić (born 30 January 1995) is a Croatian para taekwondo practitioner. He won the silver medal in the men's +75 kg event at the 2020 Summer Paralympics.
