= Athletics at the 2020 Summer Paralympics – Men's 200 metres T64 =

Men's 200 metres T64 at the XVI Paralympic Games
- Venue: Tokyo National Stadium
- Dates: 4 September 2021 (final)
- Competitors: 10 from 8 nations
- Winning time: 21.43

Medalists
| 1st place, gold medalist(s) | | Sherman Isidro Guity Guity | Costa Rica |
| 2nd place, silver medalist(s) | | Felix Streng | Germany |
| 3rd place, bronze medalist(s) | | Jarryd Wallace | United States |

The men's 200 metres T64 event at the 2020 Summer Paralympics in Tokyo, took place on 4 September 2021.

== Records ==
Prior to the competition, the existing records were as follows:

| World Record | Richard Browne (USA) | 21.27 | Doha, Qatar | 25 October 2015 |
| Paralympic Record | David Prince (USA) | 22.01 | Rio de Janeiro, Brazil | 12 September 2016 |

| Area | Time | Athlete | Nation |
|---|---|---|---|
| Africa | 22.26 | Arnu Fourie | South Africa |
| America | 21.27 WR | Richard Browne | United States |
| Asia | 23.49 | Shunsuke Itani | Japan |
| Europe | 21.42 | Felix Streng | Germany |
| Oceania | 23.65 | Mitchell Joynt | New Zealand |

== Results ==
=== Heats ===
Heat 1 took place on 4 September 2021, at 11:28:

| Rank | Lane | Name | Nationality | Class | Time | Notes |
|---|---|---|---|---|---|---|
| 1 | 3 | Felix Streng | Germany | T64 | 21.98 | Q, GR |
| 2 | 6 | Mpumelelo Mhlongo | South Africa | T44 | 22.81 | Q, WR (T44) |
| 3 | 4 | Michail Seitis | Greece | T64 | 22.95 | Q, SB |
| 4 | 7 | Kengo Oshima | Japan | T64 | 23.99 | q, SB |
| 4 | 5 | Trenten Merrill | United States | T64 | DQ | WPA 18.5a |

Heat 2 took place on 4 September 2021, at 11:34:

| Rank | Lane | Name | Nationality | Class | Time | Notes |
|---|---|---|---|---|---|---|
| 1 | 3 | Sherman Isidro Guity Guity | Costa Rica | T64 | 21.85 | Q, GR |
| 2 | 7 | Jarryd Wallace | United States | T64 | 22.18 | Q, SB |
| 3 | 5 | Jonathan Gore | United States | T64 | 22.62 | Q, PB |
| 4 | 6 | Levi Vloet | Netherlands | T64 | 22.66 | q, PB |
| 5 | 4 | Arz Zahreddine | Lebanon | T64 | 24.44 | PB |

=== Final ===
The final took place on 4 September 2021, at 20:15:

| Rank | Lane | Name | Nationality | Class | Time | Notes |
|---|---|---|---|---|---|---|
| 1st place, gold medalist(s) | 6 | Sherman Isidro Guity Guity | Costa Rica | T64 | 21.43 | GR |
| 2nd place, silver medalist(s) | 4 | Felix Streng | Germany | T64 | 21.78 | SB |
| 3rd place, bronze medalist(s) | 5 | Jarryd Wallace | United States | T64 | 22.09 | SB |
| 4 | 7 | Jonathan Gore | United States | T64 | 22.66 | |
| 5 | 8 | Mpumelelo Mhlongo | South Africa | T44 | 22.86 | |
| 6 | 2 | Michail Seitis | Greece | T64 | 22.87 | SB |
| 7 | 9 | Levi Vloet | Netherlands | T64 | 23.10 | |
| 8 | 3 | Kengo Oshima | Japan | T64 | 23.62 | PB |
