= Costa Rica at the 2016 Summer Paralympics =

- IPC code: CRC
- NPC: Comite Paralimpico de Costa Rica

in Rio de Janeiro
- Competitors: 3 in 3 sports
- Medals: Gold 0 Silver 0 Bronze 0 Total 0

Summer Paralympics appearances (overview)
- 1992; 1996; 2000; 2004; 2008; 2012; 2016; 2020; 2024

Costa Rica competed at the 2016 Summer Paralympics in Rio de Janeiro, Brazil, from 7 to 18 September 2016.

== Disability classifications ==
Every participant at the Paralympics has their disability grouped into one of five disability categories; amputation, the condition may be congenital or sustained through injury or illness; cerebral palsy; wheelchair athletes, there is often overlap between this and other categories; visual impairment, including blindness; Les autres, any physical disability that does not fall strictly under one of the other categories, for example dwarfism or multiple sclerosis. Each Paralympic sport then has its own classifications, dependent upon the specific physical demands of competition. Events are given a code, made of numbers and letters, describing the type of event and classification of the athletes competing. Some sports, such as athletics, divide athletes by both the category and severity of their disabilities, other sports, for example swimming, group competitors from different categories together, the only separation being based on the severity of the disability.

== Athletics ==
Men's Road

Athlete	Events	Final	
Athlete	Events	Time	Rank
Jose Jimenez Hernandez	Marathon T52-54	1:35:58	15

== Cycling ==
With one pathway for qualification being one highest ranked NPCs on the UCI Para-Cycling male and female Nations Ranking Lists on 31 December 2014, Costa Rica qualified for the 2016 Summer Paralympics in Rio, assuming they continued to meet all other eligibility requirements.

=== Road ===
Athlete	Event	Time	Rank
Leonel Solis	Men's road time trial C4	44:35.46	13
Leonel Solis	Men's road race C4-5	2:30:09	18

== Swimming ==
Women

Athlete	Events	Heats		Final	
Athlete	Events	Time	Rank	Time	Rank
Camila Haase Quiros	100 m backstroke S9	1:23.12	16	did not advance	
Camila Haase Quiros	100 m breaststroke SB8	1:39.99	8 Q	1:41.17	8
Camila Haase Quiros	100 m butterfly S9	1:24.46	20	did not advance	

== See also ==
- Costa Rica at the 2016 Summer Olympics
