= Costa Rica at the 2012 Summer Paralympics =

- IPC code: CRC
- NPC: Comite Paralimpico de Costa Rica

in London
- Competitors: 2 in 2 sports
- Medals: Gold 0 Silver 0 Bronze 0 Total 0

Summer Paralympics appearances (overview)
- 1992; 1996; 2000; 2004; 2008; 2012; 2016; 2020; 2024

Costa Rica competed at the 2012 Summer Paralympics in London, United Kingdom from August 29 to September 9, 2012.

== Athletics ==
Men's Track and Road Events

| Athlete | Event | Final | |
| Athlete | Event | Result | Rank |
|---|---|---|---|
| Laurens Molina Sibaja | Marathon T54 | 1:48:25 | 27 |

== Cycling ==
=== Road ===
Men

| Athlete | Event | Time | Rank |
|---|---|---|---|
| Dax Jaikel | Road Race C4-5 | 1:59:34 | 15 |
| Dax Jaikel | Time Trial C4 | 35:39.02 | 8 |

== See also ==
- Costa Rica at the 2012 Summer Olympics
