= Aruba at the 2024 Summer Paralympics =

- Flag of Aruba
- IPC code: ARU
- NPC: Aruba Paralympic Committee

in Paris, France August 28, 2024 – September 8, 2024
- Competitors: 1 in 1 sport
- Flag bearer: Elliot Andre Loonstra
- Medals: Gold 0 Silver 0 Bronze 0 Total 0

Summer Paralympics appearances (overview)
- 2016; 2020; 2024

Aruba competed at the 2024 Summer Paralympics in Paris, France, from 28 August to 8 September.

== Competitors ==
The following is the list of number of competitors in the Games.

Sport	Men	Women	Total
Taekwondo	1	0	1
Total	1	0	1

== Taekwondo ==
Athlete	Event	Round of 32	Round of 16	Quarterfinals	Repechage	Semifinals	Final / BM	
Athlete	Event	Opposition Result	Opposition Result	Opposition Result	Opposition Result	Opposition Result	Opposition Result	Rank
Elliott Andre Loonstra	Men's –80 kg	Bye	Molina (CRC); L 10–12	Did not advance				=9

== See also ==
- Aruba at the 2024 Summer Olympics
- Aruba at the Paralympics
