= Athletics at the 2023 Parapan American Games – Men's 200 metres T64 =

Men's 200 metres T64 at the 2023 Parapan American Games
- Venue: Mario Recordón Athletics Training Center
- Dates: November 24
- Competitors: 5 from 5 nations
- Winning time: 21.59

Medalists
1st place, gold medalist(s)		Sherman Guity	Costa Rica
2nd place, silver medalist(s)		Jesús Castillo	Peru
3rd place, bronze medalist(s)		Andrés Patiño	Colombia

The men's T64 200 metres competition of the athletics events at the 2023 Parapan American Games was held on November 24 at the Mario Recordón Athletics Training Center within the Julio Martínez National Stadium of Santiago, Chile.

== Records ==
Prior to this competition, the existing world and Pan American Games records were as follows:

World record	Richard Browne (USA)	21.27	Doha, Qatar	October 25, 2015
Parapan American Games record	David Prince (USA)	22.69	Toronto, Canada	August 14, 2015
Americas record	Ellivelton Costa (BRA)	25.15	São Paulo, Brazil	September 28, 2019

== Schedule ==
Date	Time	Round
November 24, 2023	18:50	Final

== Results ==
All times shown are in seconds.

KEY:	q	Fastest non-qualifiers	Q	Qualified	PR	Parapan Games record	NR	National record	SB	Seasonal best	DQ	Disqualified

=== Final ===
The results were as follows:
Wind: +2.6 m/s

Rank	Lane	Name	Nationality	Time	Notes
1st place, gold medalist(s)	5	Sherman Guity	Costa Rica	21.59	
2nd place, silver medalist(s)	7	Jesús Castillo	Peru	24.09	
3rd place, bronze medalist(s)	4	Andrés Patiño	Colombia	24.17	
4	6	Jonathan Gore	United States	24.49	
5	3	Matheus de Lima	Brazil	1:09.55	
