= Yvo de Boer =

Dutch diplomat and environmentalist (born 1954)

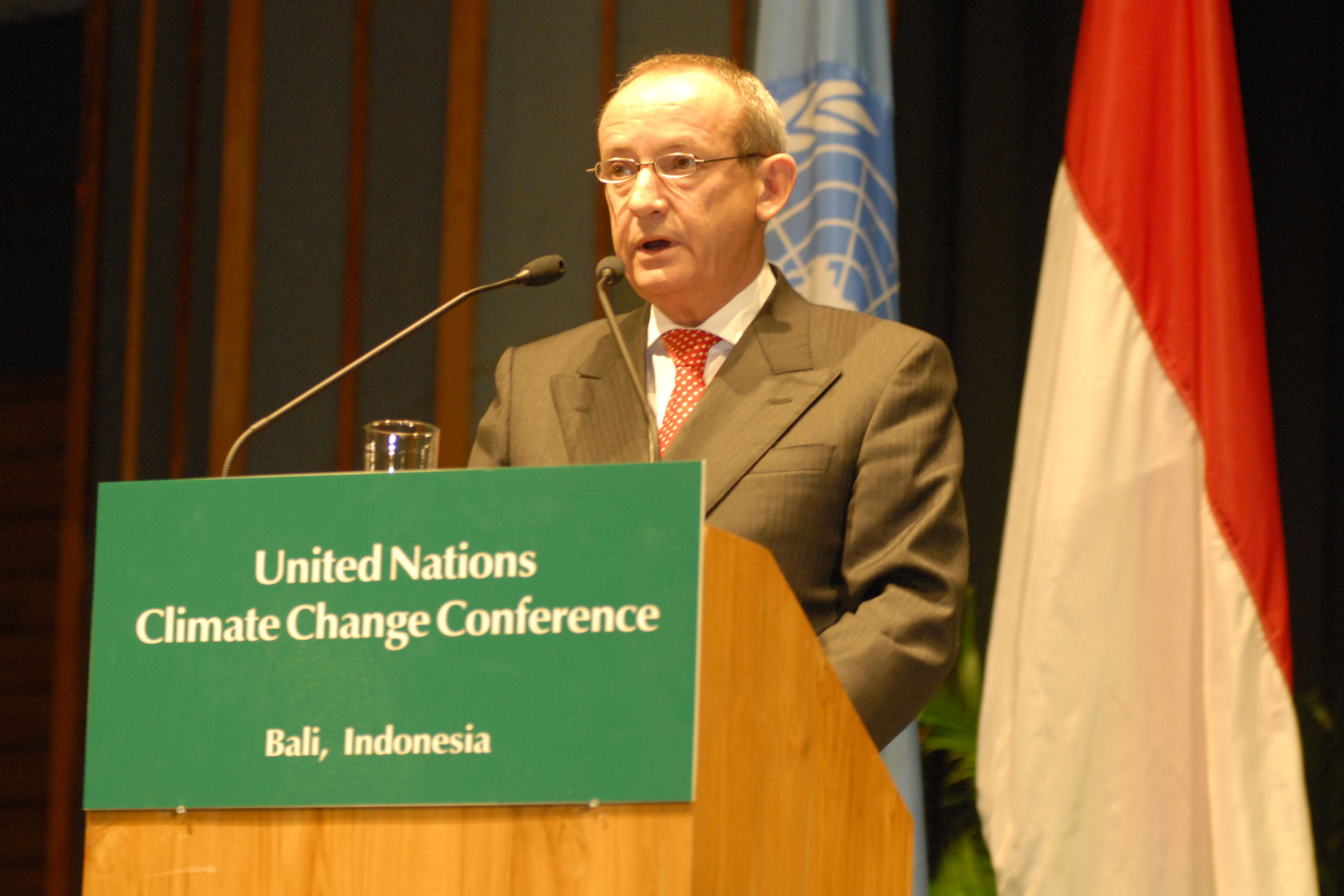
- Yvo de Boer in 2007

Director-General of the Global Green Growth Institute
- In office 15 April 2014 – 30 September 2016
- Preceded by: Howard Bamsey
- Succeeded by: Frank Rijsberman

Executive Secretary of the United Nations Framework Convention on Climate Change
- In office 10 August 2006 – 1 July 2010
- Preceded by: Joke Waller-Hunter
- Succeeded by: Christiana Figueres

Personal details
- Born: 12 June 1954 (age 71) Vienna, Austria

Yvo de Boer (born 12 June 1954) is a Dutch advisor and consultant on international environmental policy. De Boer is the former Executive Secretary of the United Nations Framework Convention on Climate Change (UNFCCC), a position he held from 2006 until 2010. After his UN tenure, de Boer was Global Chairman of Climate Change and Sustainability Services at KPMG. From 2014 to 2016 de Boer was Director-General of the Global Green Growth Institute (GGGI), a Seoul-based international environmental organization.

== Life ==
De Boer was born in Vienna on 12 June 1954. He holds a technical degree in social work from the Netherlands. De Boer is married and has three children.

== Career ==
De Boer has been involved in climate change policies since 1994, most notably helping to prepare the position of the European Union in the lead-up to the negotiations on the Kyoto Protocol. Since then, de Boer has sought broad stakeholder involvement on the issues of climate change and public policy. To that end, he launched an international dialogue on the Clean Development Mechanism and has partnered international discussions with the World Business Council on Sustainable Development, aimed at increasing private sector involvement.

De Boer was Director for International Affairs of the Ministry of Housing, Spatial Planning and Environment of the Netherlands, also working for the United Nations Human Settlements Programme (UN-HABITAT) earlier in his career. In 2006 he was appointed by then Secretary-General Kofi Annan as Executive Director of the UNFCCC; in 2010 he resigned. De Boer was succeeded as Executive Director of the UNFCC by Christiana Figueres.

De Boer became a Fellow for the International Center for Integrated Assessment and Sustainable Development at the University of Maastricht on 1 July 2010. Later, de Boer served on numerous climate change policy councils, including the China Council for International Cooperation on Environment and Development and the Board of Directors of the Center for Clean Air Policy.

== UN legacy ==
De Boer's resignation came at a time when the general utility of the United Nations' framework itself was being questioned as to "whether any significant progress toward a global treaty would be made." Additionally, de Boer's tenure had come to be seen as "too confrontational by some nations," whilst for others, a notable misstep for de Boer was in being "too enthusiastic in raising expectations for an international treaty, even after it became obvious that no such treaty would be forthcoming." De Boer purportedly lacked "ambition for a global emissions deal," and was taken to task by one British commentator over "expensive carbon offset schemes."

Nonetheless, de Boer's work on the 2009 United Nations Climate Change Conference represented a breakthrough, with former British Secretary of State for Energy and Climate Change Ed Miliband noting "Yvo de Boer's patient work helped produce the Copenhagen accord which contains commitments covering 80% of global emissions, something never previously achieved."

== External References ==
- Appearances on C-SPAN
