= Swimming at the 2016 Summer Paralympics – Women's 100 metre breaststroke SB8 =

Women's 100 metre breaststroke SB8 at the XV Paralympic Games
- Venue: Olympic Aquatics Stadium
- Dates: 14 September 2016
- Competitors: 9 from 9 nations

Medalists
1st place, gold medalist(s)		Katarina Roxon	Canada
2nd place, silver medalist(s)		Claire Cashmore	Great Britain
3rd place, bronze medalist(s)		Ellen Keane	Ireland

The women's 100 metre breaststroke SB8 event at the 2016 Paralympic Games took place on 14 September 2016, at the Olympic Aquatics Stadium. Two heats were held. The swimmers with the eight fastest times advanced to the final.

== Heats ==
=== Heat 1 ===
9:30 14 September 2016:

Rank	Lane	Name	Nationality	Time	Notes
1	5	Ellen Keane	Ireland	1:23.64	Q
2	4	Paulina Wozniak	Poland	1:25.21	Q
3	3	Nikita Howarth	New Zealand	1:33.70	Q
4	2	Lia Chachibaia	Georgia	2:02.60	

=== Heat 2 ===
9:34 14 September 2016:

Rank	Lane	Name	Nationality	Time	Notes
1	5	Katarina Roxon	Canada	1:21.27	Q
2	4	Claire Cashmore	Great Britain	1:25.91	Q
3	3	Joana Calado	Portugal	1:26.52	Q
4	6	Jialing Xu	China	1:32.48	Q
5	2	Camila Haase Quiros	Costa Rica	1:39.99	Q

== Final ==
17:36 14 September 2016:

Rank	Lane	Name	Nationality	Time	Notes
1st place, gold medalist(s)	4	Katarina Roxon	Canada	1:19.44	
2nd place, silver medalist(s)	6	Claire Cashmore	Great Britain	1:20.60	
3rd place, bronze medalist(s)	5	Ellen Keane	Ireland	1:23.07	
4	3	Paulina Wozniak	Poland	1:25.04	
5	2	Joana Calado	Portugal	1:25.96	
6	7	Jialing Xu	China	1:30.47	
7	1	Nikita Howarth	New Zealand	1:31.11	
8	8	Camila Haase Quiros	Costa Rica	1:41.17	
