= Deutsche Schule Alexander von Humboldt =

Deutsche Schule Alexander von Humboldt may refer to:

- Colegio Alemán Alexander von Humboldt (Mexico City)
- Colegio Humboldt Puebla
- Colegio Humboldt (Costa Rica)
- Deutsche Schule Lima Alexander von Humboldt
- Alexander von Humboldt Schule Montréal
