= Archery at the 2023 Parapan American Games – Women's individual compound open =

Women's individual compound open at the 2023 Parapan American Games
- Venue: Archery Center
- Dates: November 19 - November 22
- Competitors: 10 from 8 nations

Medalists
1st place, gold medalist(s)		Pilar Riveros	Costa Rica
2nd place, silver medalist(s)		Mariana Zúñiga	Chile
3rd place, bronze medalist(s)		Wendy Gardner	United States

The women's individual compound open competition of the archery events at the 2023 Parapan American Games was held from November 19 to 22 at the Archery Center in Santiago, Chile.

== Schedule ==
Date	Time	Round
November 19, 2023	09:00	Ranking Round
November 20, 2023	13:30	Round of 16
November 20, 2023	13:50	Quarterfinals
November 20, 2023	14:30	Semifinals
November 22, 2023	10:20	Final

== Results ==
WR world record | AR area record | CR championship record | GR games record | NR national record | OR Olympic record | PB personal best | SB season best | WL world leading (in a given season)

=== Ranking round ===
The results were as follows:

Rank	Archer	Nation	Score	Note
1	Mariana Zúñiga	Chile	677	PR
2	Pilar Riveros	Costa Rica	659	
3	Yasneide Peñaranda	Colombia	652	
4	Diana Gonzabay	Ecuador	648	
5	Wendy Gardner	United States	638	
6	Lya Sánchez	Mexico	638	
7	Helena Moraes	Brazil	626	
8	Teresa Wallace	United States	620	
9	Maleny Martinez	Peru	601	
10	Carla Candia	Chile	601	

=== Competition rounds ===
The results during the elimination rounds were as follows:

Round of 16
9	M. Martinez (PER)	0	0	1	0	0
8	T. Wallace (USA)	2	2	1	2	2
7	H. Moraes (BRA)	2	0	2	0	0
10	C. Candia (CHI)	0	2	0	2	2

Quarterfinals
1	M. Zúñiga (CHI)	2	2	2	0	2
8	T. Wallace (USA)	0	0	0	2	0
5	W. Gardner (USA)	0	2	1	1	2
4	D. Gonzabay (ECU)	2	0	1	1	0
3	Y. Peñaranda (COL)	2	1	2	2	2
6	L. Sánchez (MEX)	0	1	0	0	0
10	C. Candia (CHI)	0	0	0	0	0
2	P. Riveros (CRC)	2	2	2	2	2

Semifinals
1	M. Zúñiga (CHI)	2	0	2	1	2
5	W. Gardner (USA)	0	2	0	1	0
3	Y. Peñaranda (COL)	0	0	0	0	1
2	P. Riveros (CRC)	2	2	2	2	1

Final
1	M. Zúñiga (CHI)	0	0	0	2	0
2	P. Riveros (CRC)	2	2	2	0	2
Bronze medal match
5	W. Gardner (USA)	0	0	2	2	0	2
3	Y. Peñaranda (COL)	2	2	0	0	2	0
