= Costa Rica at the 2004 Summer Paralympics =

- IPC code: CRC
- NPC: Comite Paralimpico de Costa Rica

in Athens
- Competitors: 1 in 1 sport
- Flag bearer: Luis Carlos Fernandez
- Medals: Gold 0 Silver 0 Bronze 0 Total 0

Summer Paralympics appearances (overview)
- 1992; 1996; 2000; 2004; 2008; 2012; 2016; 2020; 2024

Costa Rica competed at the 2004 Summer Paralympics in Athens, Greece. The team included one athlete, but won no medals.

== Sports ==
=== Swimming ===
| Athlete | Class | Event | Heats | | Final | |
| Athlete | Class | Event | Result | Rank | Result | Rank |
|---|---|---|---|---|---|---|
| Luis Carlos Fernandez | S10 | 400m freestyle | 4:36.13 | 9 | did not advance | |
| Luis Carlos Fernandez | S10 | 100m backstroke | 1:10.89 | 11 | did not advance | |
| Luis Carlos Fernandez | S10 | 100m butterfly | 1:02.96 | 7 Q | 1:02.96 | 7 |
| Luis Carlos Fernandez | SM10 | 200m individual medley | 2:30.75 | 11 | did not advance | |

== See also ==
- Costa Rica at the Paralympics
- Costa Rica at the 2004 Summer Olympics
