= Zainutdin Ataev =

Russian para taekwondo practitioner

Personal information
- Born: 26 October 1991 (age 34) Buynaksk, Russia
- Education: Five Directions of the World

Sport
- Country: Russia
- Sport: Para taekwondo
Medal record
Representing RPC
Paralympic Games
Bronze medal – third place	2020 Tokyo	+75 kg
Representing Russia
European Championships
Bronze medal – third place	2021 Istanbul	K44 +80 kg

Zainutdin Ataev (born 26 October 1991) is a Dagestani Russian para taekwondo practitioner. He won one of the bronze medals in the men's +75 kg event at the 2020 Summer Paralympics in Tokyo, Japan. He competed at the Summer Paralympics under the flag of the Russian Paralympic Committee.

He is a graduate of the sports boarding school Five Directions of the World.
