= Mehmet Vasıf Yakut =

Turkish Para Taekwondo practitioner

Personal information
- National team: Turkey men's national para-taekwondo team
- Born: 15 March 1989 (age 37) Gevaş, Van, Turkey
- Years active: 2016-
- Height: 1.76 m (5 ft 9 in)
- Weight: 83 kg (183 lb)

Sport
- Disability class: K43
- Weight class: +75 kg
- Club: Istanbul Büyükşehir Belediyespor
- Coached by: Ali Özen
Medal record
Para Taekwondo
Representing Turkey
World Championship
Gold medal – first place	2019 Antalya	K43 +75 kg
European Championship
Silver medal – second place	2019 Bari	K43 +75 kg
Gold medal – first place	2018 Plovdiv	K43 +75 kg

Mehmet Vasıf Yakut (born 15 March 1989) is a Turkish Para Taekwondo practitioner. He obtained a quota for participation at the 2020 Summer Paralympics in Tokyo, Japan.

== Private life ==
Mehmet Vasıf Yakut was born in Gevaş district of Van, Turkey on 15 March 1989. He is disabled resulting from a birth defect.

== Sports career ==
Yakut began performing para taekwondo after he met a taekwondo practitioner in Istanbul in 2016. He is 1.76 m (5 ft 9 1/2 in) tall at83 kg (183 lb). He is a member of İstanbul Büyükşehir Belediyespor, where he is coached by Ali Özen. He competes in the sport class K43 +73 kg of Para Taekwondo.

Yakut was admitted to the Turkey national team after he became runners-up and then champion in the national championships.

He won a gold medal at the 2018 European Para Taekwondo Championship in Plovdiv, Bulgaria, and another gold medal at the 2019 World Para Taekwondo Championship in Antalya, Turkey. He took the silver medal at the 2019 European Para Taekwondo Championship in Bari, Italy. He competed at the 2020 Summer Paralympics - +75 kg, and was eliminated in the first round of the repechage match.
