= Disability in Aruba =

Disability in Aruba, the Netherlands

Disability in Aruba refers to the people with disability in Aruba.

== History ==
Aruba began to map their residents living with disabilities since 1981.

== Statistics ==
In 2010, there were 6,955 people in Aruba lived with various degrees of disability, which represented 6.9% of the population.

== See also ==
- Aruba at the Paralympics
