= Aruba at the Paralympics =

- IPC code: ARU
- Medals: Gold 0 Silver 0 Bronze 0 Total 0

Summer appearances
- 2016; 2020; 2024

Aruba made its Paralympic Games debut at the 2016 Summer Paralympics in Rio de Janeiro, sending one athlete to compete in a swimming event. Aruba has never taken part in the Winter Paralympic Games, and no Aruban athlete has won a Paralympic medal.

== History ==
The small Caribbean island of Aruba did not have a Paralympic team until Aruban-born Shardea Arias de la Cru decided that there should be one. She had attended Colegio San Nicolas High School before she studied sport at the Slippery Rock University of Pennsylvania. Shardea decided to gather the support required to establish a committee to put forward a Paralympic team. She worked for the Ministry of Tourism, Public Health and Sports and she made contact with their existing Olympic committee. She was able to establish a Paralympic committee. Aruba is part of the Kingdom of the Netherlands so she contacted the Dutch Paralympic committee who supported her work. Dutch athlete Marlou van Rhijn was a notable supporter of the initiative.

They chose 22 year old Jesus de Marchena Acevedo to be their athlete. He had been born with spina bifida and they expected him to be classified as S4. Although he had not swam since a child they helped him train to race at 50 metres. He was classified as S9 which was a surprise as he would compete against more able swimmers. They had thought that he would be classified as having little use of both legs, but the S9 class was for weakness in one leg. He went to the 2016 Summer Paralympics in Rio but because of an administrative mistake he missed his event by two minutes. On appeal he was allowed to compete at 100m but he was the only athlete in a wheelchair and he came last. The athlete from Aruba enjoyed strong support but he did not enjoy the experience.

For the postponed 2020 Summer Paralympics they chose Elliott Loonstra, as their previous athlete had abandoned his sport. Loonstra was to compete at the new Paralympic event of taekwondo. Shardea Arias de la Cru worked with Loostra as she sees it as a way of raising awareness of disability issues. She tried applying for grants but the rewards were small. More money was raised from the public and this had the plus point of further assisting awareness. Loonstra did his training early in the morning and he did not understand how important the Paralympics were. He had not expected to be the only athlete from Aruba at the games and it was only at the opening ceremony that he realised that he was representing the 112,000 people of Aruba. Loonstra dyed his hair blue to carry the flag. He was placed 9th in his event.

== Full results for Aruba at the Paralympics ==
Name	Games	Sport	Event	Score	Rank
Jesus de Marchena Acevedo	2016 Rio	Swimming	100m freestyle S9	16th	
Elliott Loonstra	2020 Tokyo	Taekwondo	Men K44 +75kg		9th

== See also ==
- Disability in Aruba

== See also ==
- Aruba at the Olympics
