= Aruba at the 2020 Summer Paralympics =

- Flag of Aruba
- IPC code: ARU
- NPC: National Paralympic Committee Armenia

in Tokyo, Japan August 24, 2021 – September 5, 2021
- Competitors: 1 (1 man and 0 women) in 1 sport
- Flag bearer: Elliott Andre Loonstra
- Medals: Gold 0 Silver 0 Bronze 0 Total 0

Summer Paralympics appearances (overview)
- 2016; 2020; 2024

Aruba competed at the 2020 Summer Paralympics in Tokyo, Japan, from 24 August to 5 September 2021. This was their second consecutive appearance at the Summer Paralympics since 2016.

== Competitors ==
The following is the list of number of competitors participating in the Games:

Sport	Men	Women	Total
Taekwondo	1	0	1

== Taekwondo ==
DNA: Did not advance | PTF: Win by final score

Athlete	Event	First round	Quarterfinals	Semifinals	Repechage 1	Repechage 2	Final	
Athlete	Event	Opposition Result	Opposition Result	Opposition Result	Opposition Result	Opposition Result	Opposition Result	Rank
Elliott Andre Loonstra	Men's +75 kg	Ismaili (MAR) L 32-23, PTF	N/A		Molina (CRC) L 16-3, PTF	DNA		9

== See also ==
- Aruba at the Paralympics
- Aruba at the 2020 Summer Olympics
