= Tom Rivett-Carnac =

English climate strategist (born 1977)

Thomas Charles Rivett-Carnac OBE (born 1977) is a former political strategist for the United Nations Framework Convention on Climate Change. He is also an author on climate change policy, a podcaster, and an advisor to corporations and governments on climate solutions.

== Early life ==
Rivett-Carnac was born in Hammersmith, London, England in November 1977. He is the eldest son of Christopher Charles Rivett-Carnac, a descendant of Sir James Rivett-Carnac, 1st Baronet. His mother, Sara Catherine Hutchinson, a daughter of Dr. R. J. C. Hutchinson, married his father in West Somerset in 1974.

Growing up he travelled widely, living in Indonesia, Tunisia, UAE and Australia and went to Allhallows College at the age of 13. He attended Bath Spa University, graduating with a BSc in Environment and Economics, and Schumacher College-Plymouth University, where he took a master's degree in Holistic Science and graduated in the same class as Nigel Topping, who went on to become the UK's High Level Champion for Climate Action for COP26.

After graduating, Rivett-Carnac spent three years living as a Buddhist monk in Thailand and Myanmar.

== Career ==
After positions at consultants CarbonSense and engineering firm Dyson, Rivett-Carnac joined CDP (formerly the Carbon Disclosure Project) in 2006. He was part of the team that set up the original CDP Supply Chain and CDP Cities programs. In 2012 he moved to New York to become President and CEO of CDP North America.

In 2013 he was approached by Christiana Figueres and shortly afterwards moved to Bonn, Germany in the position of Senior Advisor to the Executive Secretary of the United Nations Framework Convention on Climate Change His responsibility was the political strategy towards achieving binding international agreements. He is seen as one of the architects of the Paris Climate Accord of December 2015.

In 2016 Rivett-Carnac left the United Nations together with Christiana Figueres and they co-founded Global Optimism. From that position he advises a wide range of corporations and governments. This includes serving as a co-founder of the Climate Pledge; together with Amazon, and a Fellow at the Bezos Earth Fund. He is also on the Expert Review Panel for the Earthshot Prize. He is a former Senior Fellow at Stanford Law School.

Rivett-Carnac is the co-host of the podcast Outrage and Optimism and co-author of the bestselling book The Future we Choose: The Stubborn Optimist's Guide to the Climate Crisis. His TED Talk has been viewed 3 million times.

During the global lockdown of 2020, Rivett-Carnac wrote a children's book called When We All Stopped, illustrated by his sister, Bee Rivett-Carnac. Ted-Ed made the book into an animation, voiced by Jane Goodall, which has since been viewed more than 1.3 million times.

Rivett-Carnac was awarded an Honorary PhD from Knox College, Illinois in 2021.

He was appointed Officer of the Order of the British Empire (OBE) in the 2022 Birthday Honours for services to tackling climate change.

== Personal life ==
Rivett-Carnac married Natasha Walter of Minneapolis, Minnesota, in August 2007. They have two children. They divide their time between Devon and London.

== Books ==
- Christiana Figueres and Tom Rivett-Carnac, The Future We Choose: Surviving the Climate Crisis. Description & arrow-searchable preview. (Manilla Press, 2020) ASIN B07Y7HZLX8
