= Matheus de Lima =

Brazilian para athlete (born 2003)

Personal information
- Nationality: Brazilian
- Born: 19 November 2003 (age 22)

Sport
- Sport: Para athletics
- Disability class: T44
Medal record
Men's para-athletics
Representing Brazil
World Championships
Silver medal – second place	2025 New Delhi	100 m T44
Bronze medal – third place	2023 Paris	100 m T44

Matheus de Lima (born 19 November 2003) is a Brazilian para athlete who competes in T44 sprint events. He represented Brazil at the 2024 Summer Paralympics.

== Career ==
He represented Brazil at the 2023 Parapan American Games and finished in fifth place in the 200 metres T64 event. He then represented Brazil at the 2024 Summer Paralympics. On 4 August 2025, he was selected to compete at the 2025 World Para Athletics Championships. He won a silver medal in the 100 metres T44 event.
