= Khalimbekaul =

Khalimbekaul Халимбекаул Халимбек-авул
- Selo
- Location within Republic of Dagestan Location within Russia
- Coordinates: 42°50′N 47°08′E
- Country: Russia
- Region: Republic of Dagestan
- District: Buynaksky District
- Time zone: UTC+3:00

Khalimbekaul (Russian: Халимбекаул; Kumyk: Халимбек-авул, Xalimbek-avul) is a rural locality (a selo) and the administrative centre of Khalimbekaulsky Selsoviet, Buynaksky District, Republic of Dagestan, Russia. The population was 5,108 as of 2010. There are 65 streets.

== Geography ==
Khalimbekaul is located 5 km northeast of Buynaksk (the district's administrative centre) by road, on the Shuraozen River. Kafyr-Kumukh and Buynaksk are the nearest rural localities.
