= Ellen Keane =

Irish Paralympic swimmer (born 1995)

Personal information
- Nationality: Irish
- Born: 6 April 1995 (age 31) Dublin, Ireland

Sport
- Country: Ireland
- Sport: Paralympic swimming
- Disability class: S9, SM9, SB8
- Events: Breaststroke, butterfly, individual medley
- Club: NAC Swim Club
Medal record
Women's para swimming
Representing Ireland
Summer Paralympics
Gold medal – first place	2020 Tokyo	100m breaststroke (SB8)
Bronze medal – third place	2016 Rio de Janeiro	100m breaststroke (SB8)
World Championships
Silver medal – second place	2022 Madeira	100m breaststroke SB8
Silver medal – second place	2023 Manchester	100m breaststroke SB8
Bronze medal – third place	2013 Montreal	100m butterfly S9
Bronze medal – third place	2013 Montreal	100 m breaststroke SB8

Ellen Keane (born 6 April 1995) is an Irish retired Paralympic swimmer and gold medallist competing in S9, SM9 and SB8 classification events.

== Career ==
Keane won three bronze medals at world championships before winning a bronze medal in the 100 m breaststroke (SB8) at the 2016 Summer Paralympics, and gold at the same event at the 2020 Summer Paralympics.

== Personal life ==
Keane was born with an undeveloped left arm and competes as an amputee. She is a student at Dublin Institute of Technology.

In June 2017 she was honoured by the Lord Mayor of Dublin, Brendan Carr, with a Lord Mayor's Award, which is awarded 'to citizens who, through their ordinary everyday lives, enrich this city in an extraordinary way'.

== Media appearances ==
In 2017, Keane gave a TEDx Talk Entitled 'My Lucky Fin' telling the story of how she changed the way of looking at her own disability - and how that in turn changed her entire life.

In 2022, Keane appeared on the fifth series of the Irish version of Dancing With the Stars overall Keane finished the competition in second place losing out on the win to Nina Carberry and her pro-partner Pasquale La Rocca.

In 2025 Keane became one of the coaches for the 13th season of Ireland's Fittest Family.

== Culture ==
For International women's day in 2022 An Post launched a stamp collection of Irish sports women which featured Keane and others.

Ellen was joint Grand Marshall with Kellie Harrington at the Dublin St. Patrick's Day parade on 17 March 2022.
