= Taekwondo at the 2020 Summer Paralympics – Men's +75 kg =

Taekwondo – Men's +75 kg K44 at the XVI Paralympic Games
- Venue: Makuhari Messe Hall B
- Date: 4 September 2021
- Competitors: 12 from 12 nations

Medalists
1st place, gold medalist(s)		Asghar Aziziaghdam	Iran
2nd place, silver medalist(s)		Ivan Mikulić	Croatia
3rd place, bronze medalist(s)		Evan Medell	United States
3rd place, bronze medalist(s)		Zainutdin Ataev	RPC

The men's +75 kg taekwondo competition at the 2020 Summer Paralympics was held on 4 September 2021 at the Makuhari Messe Hall B.

== Results ==
=== Bracket ===
Round of 16
Francisco Pedroza (MEX)	25
Mohamed Abidar (LBA)	28
Rachid Ismaili Alaoui (MAR)	32
Elliott Loonstra (ARU)	23
Joseph Lane (GBR)	5
Zainutdin Ataev (RPC)	36
Nyshan Omirali (KAZ)	6
Andrés Molina (CRC)	12

Quarterfinals
Evan Medell (USA)	22
Mohamed Abidar (LBA)	19
Rachid Ismaili Alaoui (MAR)	11
Ivan Mikulić (CRO)	28
Mehmet Vasıf Yakut (TUR)	8
Zainutdin Ataev (RPC)	30
Andrés Molina (CRC)	9
Asghar Aziziaghdam (IRI)	11

Semifinals
Evan Medell (USA)	9
Ivan Mikulić (CRO)	28
Zainutdin Ataev (RPC)	4
Asghar Aziziaghdam (IRI)	9

Final
Ivan Mikulić (CRO)	10
Asghar Aziziaghdam (IRI)	12

=== Repechage ===
Repechage 1
Elliott Loonstra (ARU)	3
Andrés Molina (CRC)	16
Joseph Lane (GBR)	18
Mohamed Abidar (LBA)	23

Repechage 2
Andrés Molina (CRC)	19
Mohamed Abidar (LBA)	17

Bronze medal
Evan Medell (USA)	13
Andrés Molina (CRC)	11

Repechage 1
Francisco Pedroza (MEX)	23
Mehmet Vasıf Yakut (TUR)	2
Nyshan Omirali (KAZ)	24
Rachid Ismaili Alaoui (MAR)	8

Repechage 2
Francisco Pedroza (MEX)	18
Nyshan Omirali (KAZ)	15

Bronze medal
Zainutdin Ataev (RPC)	18
Francisco Pedroza (MEX)	4
