= Evan Medell =

American Para Taekwondo practitioner

Personal information
- Born: 31 March 1997 (age 29) Grand Haven, Michigan, United States
- Height: 6 ft (180 cm)
- Weight: 185 lb (84 kg)

Sport
- Sport: Para taekwondo
Medal record
Representing United States
Paralympic Games
| Bronze medal – third place | 2020 Tokyo | +75 kg |
| Bronze medal – third place | 2024 Paris | +80 kg |
Parapan American Games
| Gold medal – first place | 2019 Lima | +75 kg |
| Gold medal – first place | 2023 Santiago | +80 kg |
European Championships
| Silver medal – second place | 2024 Belgrade | +80 kg |

Evan Medell (born March 31, 1997) is a Para Taekwondo practitioner. He represented the United States at the 2020 Summer Paralympics. He won one of the bronze medals in the men's +75 kg event. He had previously won a gold medal in Taekwondo at the 2019 Parapan American Games.
