= Asghar Azizi =

Iranian para taekwondo practitioner (born 1987)

Personal information
- Full name: Asghar Azizi Aghdam; Asghar Aziziaghdam
- Born: 26 December 1987 (age 38) Mianeh, Iran

Sport
- Country: Iran
- Sport: Para taekwondo
Medal record
Representing Iran
Paralympic Games
Gold medal – first place	2020 Tokyo	+75 kg

Asghar Azizi Aghdam (Persian: اصغر عزیزی اقدم, romanized: Asghar Azizi Aghdam; born 26 December 1987) is an Iranian para taekwondo practitioner. He won the gold medal in the men's +75 kg event at the 2020 Summer Paralympics in Tokyo, Japan.
