= Mariana Zúñiga =

Chilean Paralympic archer

Personal information
- Full name: Mariana Elena Adelina Zúñiga Varela
- Born: 12 July 2002 (age 24) Santiago, Chile

Sport
- Country: Chile
- Sport: Paralympic archery
- Disability: Myelomeningocele
- Event: Compound open
Medal record
Women's archery compound open
Representing Chile
Paralympic Games
| Silver medal – second place | 2020 Tokyo | Individual compound open |
Parapan American Games
| Silver medal – second place | 2023 Santiago | Individual compound open |
South American Games
| Bronze medal – third place | 2022 Asunción | Mixed team |

Mariana Elena Adelina Zúñiga Varela (born 12 July 2002) is a Chilean Paralympic archer. She won silver in the Women's individual compound open in the 2020 Summer Paralympics in Tokyo.
