= Camila Haase =

Costa Rican swimmer (born 2000)

Personal information
- Full name: Camila Haase Quiros
- National team: Costa Rica
- Born: 2 February 2000 (age 26) Alajuela
- Education: Colegio Humboldt (Costa Rica)

Sport
- Country: Costa Rica
- Sport: Swimming
- Disability: Left arm below elbow amputee
- Disability class: SB8
Medal record
Paralympic swimming
Representing Costa Rica
Parapan American Games
Silver medal – second place	2019 Lima	100m breaststroke SB8

Camila Haase Quiros (Note: In this Spanish name, the first or paternal surname is Haase and the second or maternal family name is Quiros.) (born 2 February 2000) is a Costa Rican swimmer who became the first woman from her country to compete at a Paralympic Games when she took part at Rio de Janeiro in 2016.

== Career ==
Prior to her birth, Camila's mother umbilical cord wrapped around Camila's left arm, cutting off the circulation of blood. This resulted in the arm being amputated below the elbow 13 days after she was born. She began playing sports at the age of three, taking part in football, swimming and athletics. She attends Colegio Humboldt (Costa Rica), Costa Rica. Her mother Patricia Quirós, competed in swimming in her youth, as did her sister.

At the age of 16, Camila was called up to the Costa Rican team for the 2016 Summer Paralympics in Rio de Janeiro, Brazil. She had qualified after taking part in the International Swimming Open in 2015. This made her the first female athlete to compete at a Paralympic Games for Costa Rica. She underwent intensive training under her coach Rodrigo Rivas at the facilities in Rio prior to the start of the Games. Rivas said that her aim was to set new personal bests, rather than make it to the swimming finals. Competing in the SB8 classification, Camila took part in the women's 100 mere breaststroke, qualifying out of the heats with a time of 1:39.99. She finished eight in the final, with a time of 1:41.17.
