= Kevin Polish =

American Paralympic archer

Personal information
- Nickname: KJ
- Born: November 19, 1982 (age 43) Carmichaels, Pennsylvania, United States

Sport
- Country: United States
- Sport: Paralympic archery
- Disability: Spinal cord injury
Medal record
Paralympic archery
Representing United States
World Championships
Gold medal – first place	2005 Madrid	Men's team
Gold medal – first place	2025 Gwangju	Double

Kevin "KJ" Polish Jr. (born November 19, 1982) is an American Paralympic archer.

He began archery aged three by his father, Kevin Sr., who owned an archery shop and began competing aged eleven. In 1999, Polish was involved in a car crash and suffered life-changing injuries and he went back to competitive archery in 2000 after his rehabilitation. He won his first medal in the 2005 World Archery Championships along with Dave Cousins and Braden Gellenthien.

== Car crash ==
On October 9, 1999, Polish went deer hunting with his friends. After 3 hours of hunting, they decided to go on a dirt track road driving at 30 mph. A flock of turkeys went onto the road in front of the car that Polish was driving, he swerved his car to avoid the birds, applied his brakes and his car went off the road and into a 100 ft embankment. Polish got the car in control before his car hit a 2 ft tree stump which resulted in his car to jackknife and roll the car multiple times down the hill, he was thrown out of the vehicle (even though he was wearing a seatbelt), the impact of the crash was so severe that the seatbelt broke and the buckle detached itself and he hit into a tree and broke his back.

After Polish hit the ground, he heard his friends calling for him, once he put his hands on the ground to push himself up he then heard a "pop": he only had his chest off the ground but the middle part of his body was turned around and he grabbed a part of his leg but couldn't feel anything. When the paramedics arrived, they had to use the jaws of life to get Polish out of the tree.

=== Hospital stay ===
Polish stayed in hospital for four months from October 1999 to January 2000, for the first two weeks, Polish couldn't speak or open his eyes. The doctors had diagnosed that he broke his back from T7 to T10 and they put in screws, bolts and clamps to repair Polish's back, the doctors told Polish that he wouldn't be able to sit or stand.
