= Colegio Humboldt (Costa Rica) =

Coordinates: 9.9437°N 84.1244°W

Colegio Humboldt-Schule (Costa Rica)
- Pavas, San José; Costa Rica

Information
- Type: German International School
- Established: 1912
- Grades: Preschool through Abitur
- Website: https://www.humboldt.ed.cr

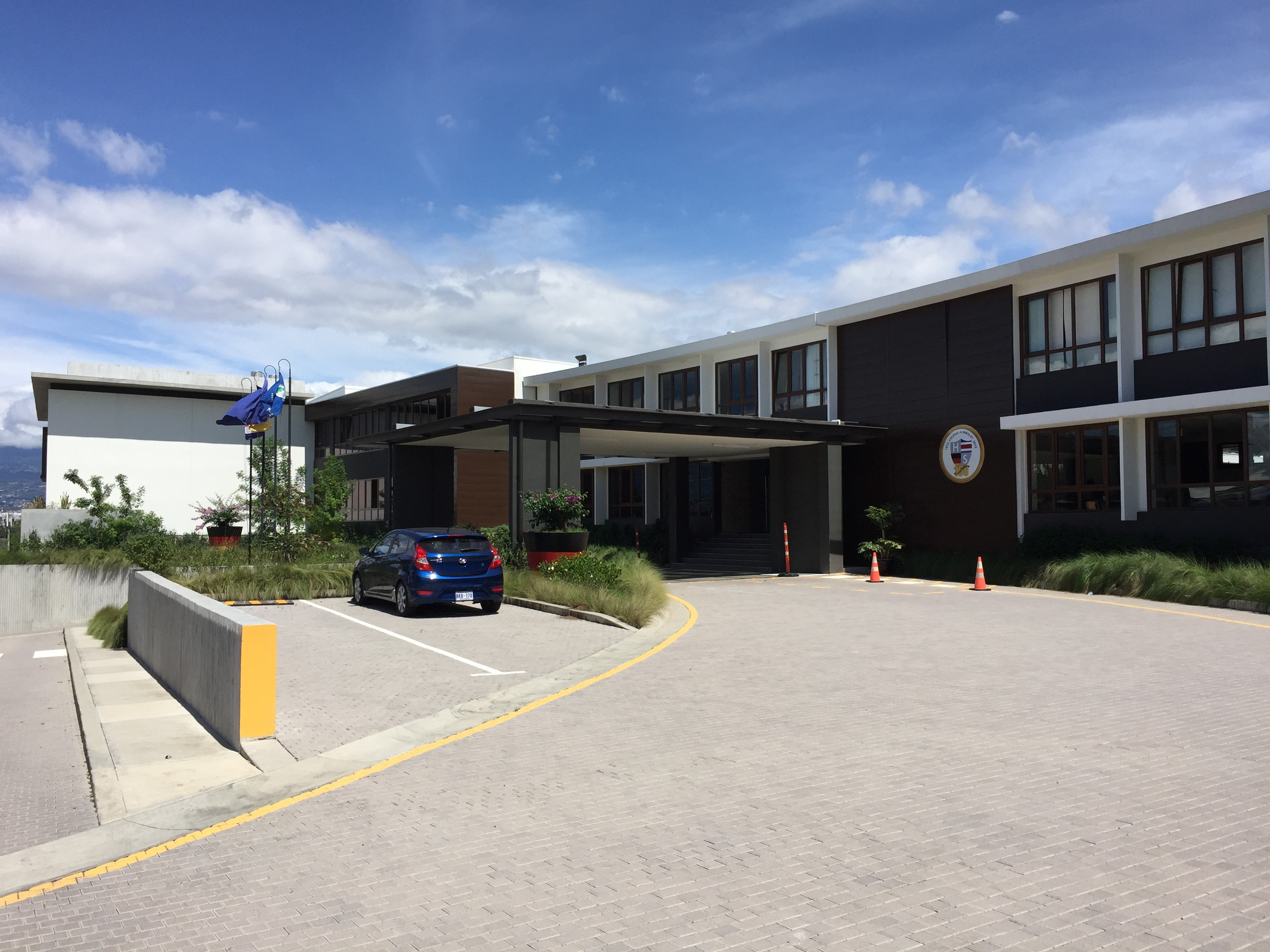

Colegio Humboldt (German: Humboldt-Schule) is a German international school in Pavas, San José, Costa Rica, serving a student body that includes preschool through Abitur.

The German School of Costa Rica was founded in 1912, initially only offering classes in kindergarten and primary school levels. The school closed during the two world wars, but with the support from the local German community in Costa Rica, was able to reopen in 1956 as the "Colegio Humboldt - Schule", and expanded to include secondary school classes in 1975 with the addition of the "Nueva Secundaria". In addition to students with German backgrounds, the student body today includes pupils with backgrounds from other European countries as well as from the United States, and other countries in Latin America, including Colombia and Venezuela.

Students generally enter the school at Kindergarten. In addition, the school offers a scholarship program which supports a number of Costa Rican students with high academic performance but no German-related background for entry to the school in the 5th grade.

The school is trilingual, with German and Spanish taught first. From the first day of Kindergarten, learning the German language is prioritized, which is a new language for the vast majority of students. This is achieved through language immersion, and teachers communicate with the children during the day's activities exclusively in German. English is first introduced in Grade 5. By the time the students graduate, most of them are fluent in all three languages.

The school offers the German high school certificate, the Abitur, in addition to the Costa Rican Bachillerato. Humboldt is known for its wide range of extra-curricular activities, including dozens of after-school clubs, and its sports program and facilities that include an Olympic size swimming pool, a full size track and soccer field. The school also boasts a professional theater, the "Humboldt Auditorium", which opened in August 2018.
