= Sherman Guity =

Costa Rican Paralympic athlete

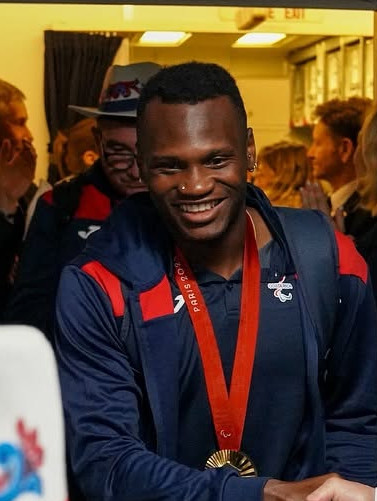
- Guity in 2024

Personal information
- Full name: Sherman Isidro Guity Guity
- Born: 3 December 1996 (age 29) Limón, Costa Rica

Sport
- Country: Costa Rica
- Sport: Para-athletics
- Events: 100 metres; 200 metres
Medal record
Men's para athletics
Representing Costa Rica
Paralympic Games
| Gold medal – first place | 2020 Tokyo | 200 m T64 |
| Gold medal – first place | 2024 Paris | 100 m T64 |
| Gold medal – first place | 2024 Paris | 200 m T64 |
| Silver medal – second place | 2020 Tokyo | 100 m T64 |
World Championships
| Gold medal – first place | 2024 Kobe | 100 m T64 |
| Silver medal – second place | 2023 Paris | 100 m T64 |
| Silver medal – second place | 2025 New Delhi | 200 m T64 |
| Bronze medal – third place | 2025 New Delhi | 100 m T64 |
Parapan American Games
| Gold medal – first place | 2023 Santiago | 100 m T64 |
| Gold medal – first place | 2023 Santiago | 200 m T64 |

Sherman Isidro Guity Guity (born 3 December 1996) is a Costa Rican Paralympic athlete. He competes in the disability category of T64, specializing in the 100 metres and 200 metres sprints. He won the silver medal in the men's 100 metres T64 event at the 2020 Summer Paralympics held in Tokyo, Japan, becoming the first competitor representing Costa Rica at the Paralympics to win a medal. He has gone on to win multiple sprint titles and is the current paralympic record holder for both the 100m and 200m T64 events.

== Personal life ==
On 25 August 2017, at the age of 20, Guity suffered a life-altering motorcycle accident which led to the amputation of his left leg below the knee. Costa Rican media later noted that, while recovering at the hospital, Guity promised that he would become "the best Paralympic athlete."

On 11 November 2019, Guity was suspended by the IPC for 2 years for a non-intentional anti-doping violation after the substance Clostebol was found in an out of competition test used to treat a scar from a wound.

His sporting hero is Jamaican sprinter Usain Bolt.

== Athletics career ==
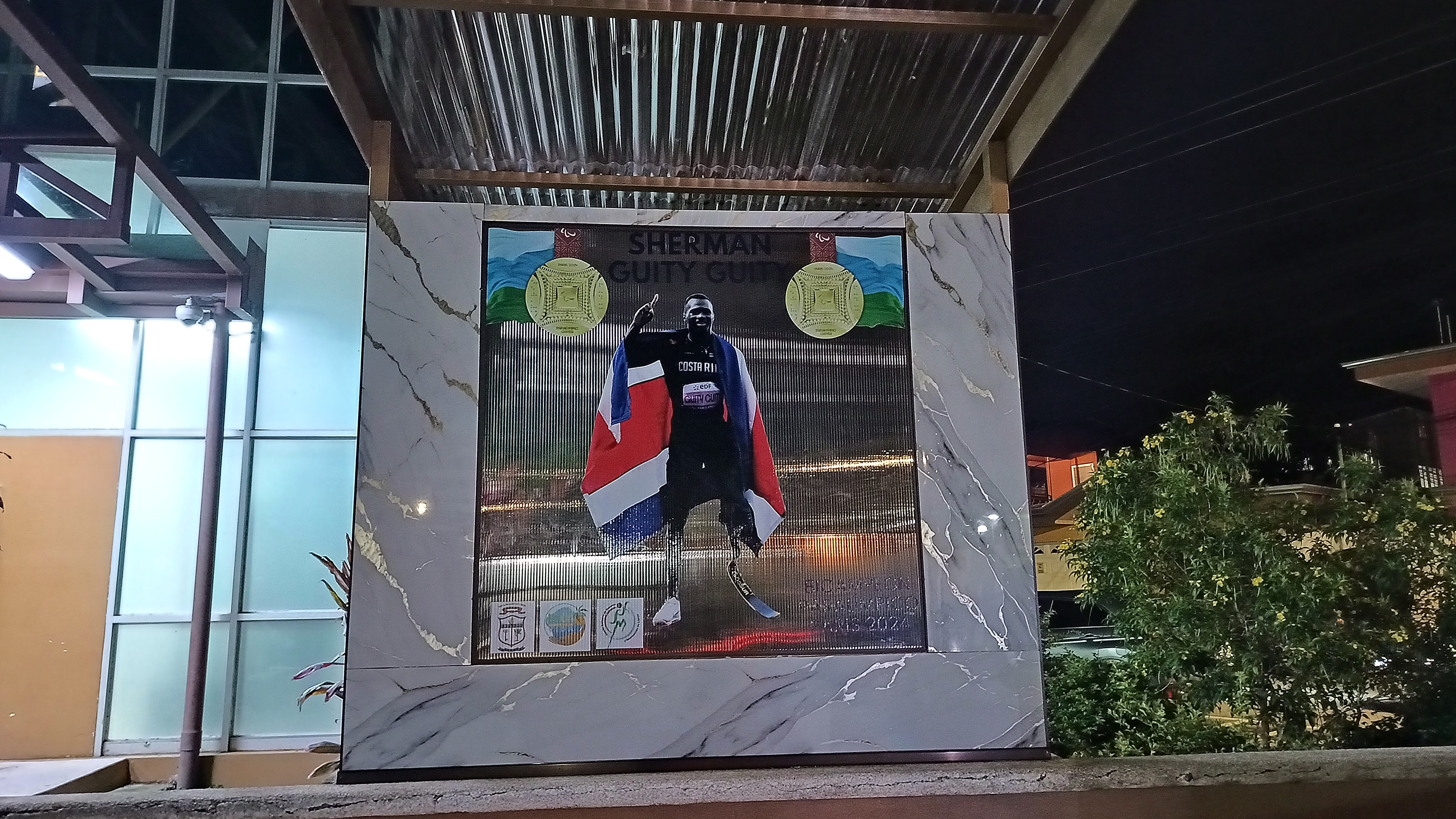
Limón's municipality honored Guity on its city hall plaza

On 30 August 2021 during the 2020 Summer Paralympics, Guity came second in the men's 100 metres T64 sprint, winning silver and Costa Rica's first ever paralympic medal. He then went on to win Costa Rica's first ever paralympic gold medal in the men's 200 metres T64 sprint.

During the 2024 Paris Summer Paralympics, Guity established himself as a world-class athlete by winning the men's 100 metres T64, achieving his second paralympic gold medal and first in the 100m sprint. He went on to win gold in the men's 200 metres T64 defending his Paralympic title and accomplishing the sprint double.

== Achievements ==
| Competition | Place | Event | Rank | Time | Notes |
|---|---|---|---|---|---|
| 2020 Summer Paralympics | Japan, Tokyo | 100 m T64 | 2nd place, silver medalist(s) | 10.76 | PB |
| 2020 Summer Paralympics | Japan, Tokyo | 200 m T64 | 1st place, gold medalist(s) | 21.43 | PR |
| 2023 World Para Athletics Championships | France, Paris | 100 m T64 | 1st place, gold medalist(s) | 10.79 | |
| 2023 World Para Athletics Championships | France, Paris | 200 m T64 | 6 | 35.10 | |
| 2023 Parapan American Games | Chile, Santiago | 100 m T64 | 1st place, gold medalist(s) | 10.89 | |
| 2023 Parapan American Games | Chile, Santiago | 200 m T64 | 1st place, gold medalist(s) | 21.59 | GR |
| 2024 World Para Athletics Championships | Japan, Kobe | 100 m T64 | 1st place, gold medalist(s) | 10.88 | |
| 2024 Summer Paralympics | France, Paris | 100 m T64 | 1st place, gold medalist(s) | 10.65 | PR |
| 2024 Summer Paralympics | France, Paris | 200 m T64 | 1st place, gold medalist(s) | 21.32 | PR |
